= Peugeot 306 =

Small family car by Peugeot, 1993–2002

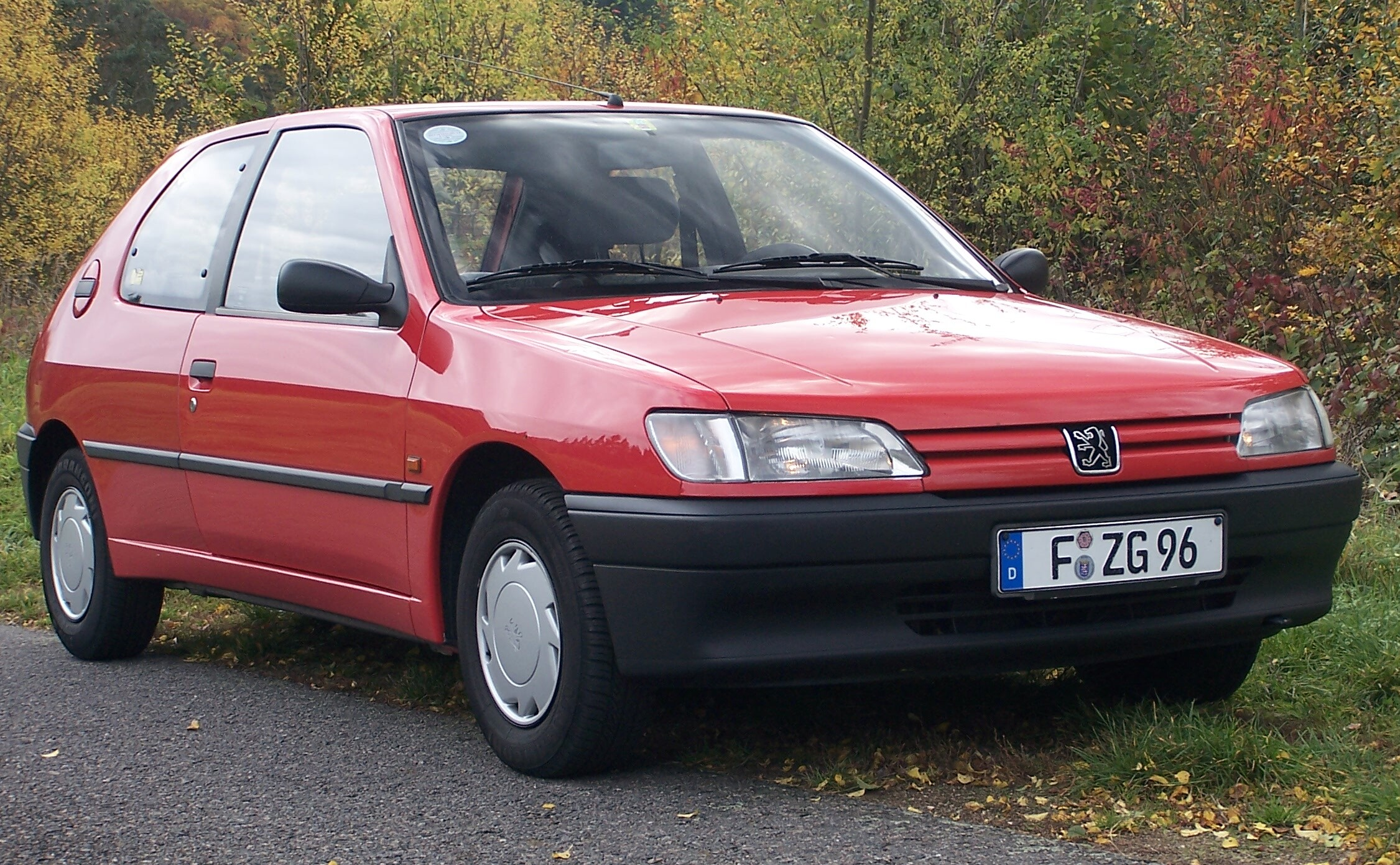
- 1995 Peugeot 306 1.4 Atoll

Overview
- Manufacturer: Peugeot
- Production: 1993–2002
- Assembly: France: Poissy (Poissy Plant); France: Sochaux (Sochaux Plant); Argentina: El Palomar (Sevel: saloon); Chile: Los Andes (Automotores Franco Chilena S.A.); Ecuador: Manta (Noboa / Coenansa); Indonesia: Jakarta (Gaya Motor: saloon); Italy: San Giorgio Canavese (Pininfarina: CC); Nigeria: Kaduna (PAN); United Kingdom: Ryton-on-Dunsmore (Ryton Plant); Uruguay: Barra de Carrasco (Oferol: Break)
- Designer: Pininfarina (hatchback); Pietro Camardella at Pininfarina (cabriolet)

Body and chassis
- Class: Small family car (C)
- Body style: 3/5-door hatchback 4-door saloon 5-door estate 2-door cabriolet
- Layout: FF layout
- Related: Citroën Xsara; Citroën ZX

Powertrain
- Transmission: 4-speed automatic ZF 4HP14; 4-speed automatic AL4; 5-speed manual MA 5; 5-speed manual BE 3/5; 6-speed manual BE 3/6

Dimensions
- Wheelbase: 2,580 mm (102 in)
- Length: 4,030 mm (159 in) (hatchback); 4,267 mm (168 in) (sedan); 4,338 mm (171 in) (wagon)
- Width: 1,680 mm (66 in)
- Height: 1,380 mm (54 in) (hatchback); 1,386 mm (55 in) (sedan); 1,415 mm (56 in) (wagon)

Chronology
- Predecessor: Peugeot 309
- Successor: Peugeot 307

The Peugeot 306 is a small family car built by the French car manufacturer Peugeot from 1993 to 2002. It replaced the 309. Peugeot gave the 306 many updates and aesthetic changes to keep up with the competition, and it was replaced by the 307 in 2001. Cabriolet and estate versions continued until 2002. Versions were built in Argentina by Sevel from 1996 to 2002.

== Background ==
The 306 was developed between 1990 and 1992 for a launch in February 1993. It was a replacement for the Peugeot 309 (which had broken with Peugeot's normal ascending numbering system partly due to it being released before the older and larger Peugeot 305 was axed).

Concept versions of the 306 were first seen around the end of 1990, although the motoring press initially reported that it was going to replace the smaller 205. However, by the end of 1991, Peugeot had confirmed that the new car was going to replace the 309, as well as some versions of the 205, which was going to remain in production for several more years, despite the launch of the entry-level 106 supermini in September 1991.

Mechanically, the 306 is virtually identical to the Citroën ZX, which was launched two years before the 306: both cars use the same floorpan and core structure. The 306, with its Peugeot 205 derived Pininfarina styling, was a more successful car than its twin. The Citroën Berlingo and Peugeot Partner were also built on the same platform. The chassis used by the 306 and ZX was also used in the ZX's replacement, the Citroën Xsara. The sharing of platforms between Peugeot and Citroën has been parent company PSA Peugeot Citroën policy since the late 1970s, after the Peugeot takeover of the then bankrupt Citroën in the wake of the 1974 oil crisis. The first example was the Peugeot 104-based Citroën Visa and Citroën LNA (and the Talbot Samba).

== 306 Phase 1 ==
Phase 1
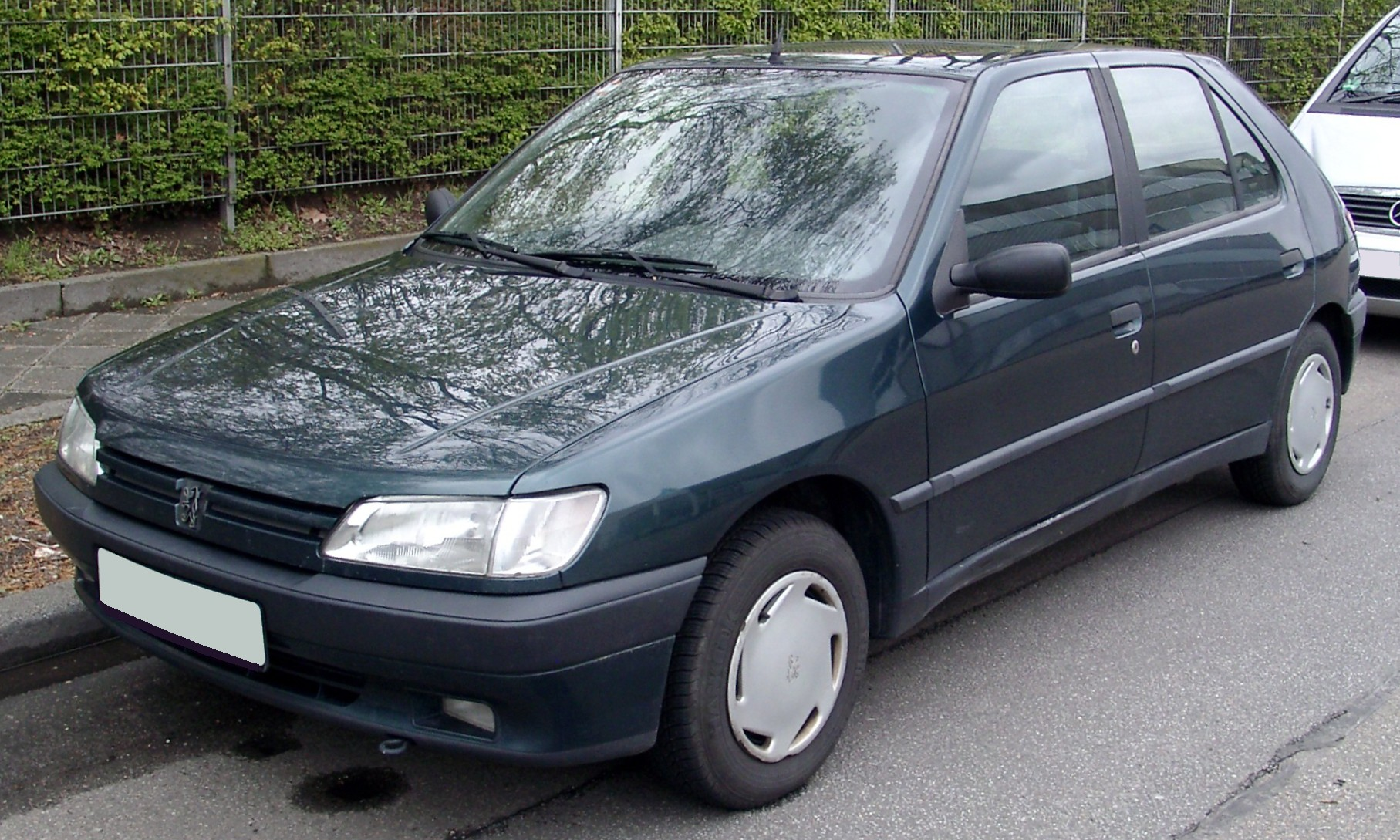

Overview
- Production: 1993–1997

Powertrain
- Engine: Petrol: 1124 cc TU1 I4; 1360 cc TU3 I4; 1587 cc TU5 I4; 1761 cc XU7 I4; 1998 cc XU10 I4; 1998 cc XU10 J4 16V I4; Diesel: 1769 cc XUD7 TE TD I4; 1905 cc XUD9 I4; 1905 cc XUD9 TE TD I4

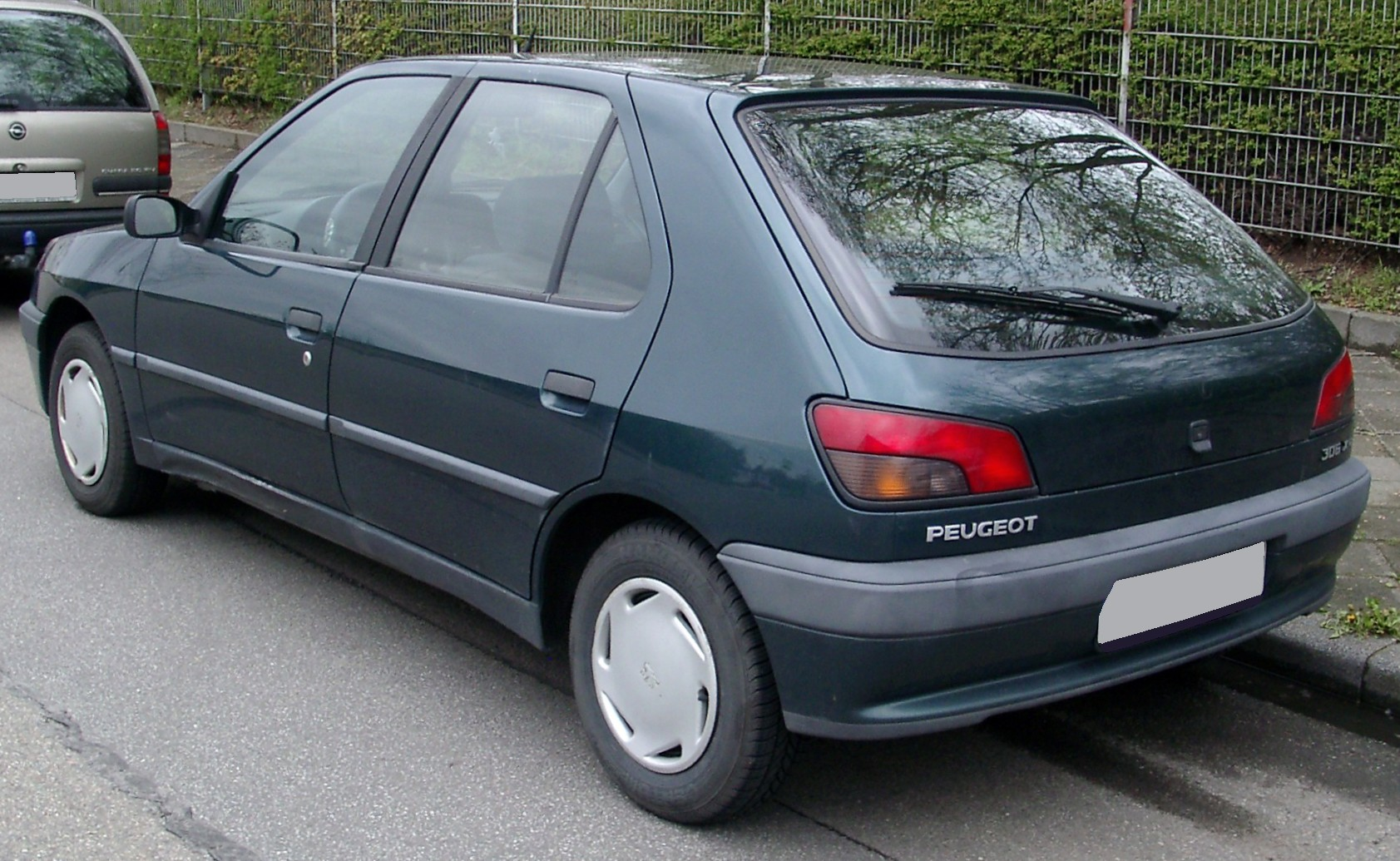
Peugeot 306 rear

The 306 was released in 1993 as a 3- and 5-door hatchback, with saloon and cabriolet models being introduced a year later. The Phase 1 model was known as the N3 in Australia and was introduced in 1994.

A wide array of different model types were offered during the life of the Phase 1 model, including Genoa, XSS, XT, XRdt and XLd. Various 'performance' models were added later, such as the S16, XSi and GTI-6 (petrol) and the D-Turbo S (diesel).

All variants of the 306, with the exception of the GTI-6 and cabriolet models, were priced very competitively.

=== Petrol engines ===
The initial petrol engines used were proven four-cylinder units, which had gained a solid reputation in Peugeot models such as the 205, 309 and 405. At first, all mainstream models were powered by derivatives of the TU series 8-valve engine, in 1.1-, 1.4- and 1.6-litre guises. The 1.1 was dropped quickly, but the 1.4 and particularly the 1.6 variants sold well, the latter offering a balance between performance and economy.

Three larger-capacity units were available, but restricted to automatic and performance models. These engines were developments of the larger XU series units which had been used in the 205 GTi 1.9, and larger 405 models. A 1.8-litre version powered cars with both manual (not many 1.8 manuals were produced) and automatic transmission, while two versions of the 2.0-litre engine in 8- and 16-valve guises powered the XSi and S16 models respectively. In Australia, the only engines available were the 1.8 and 2.0 L engines.

=== Diesel engines ===
Peugeot had an excellent reputation for its diesel engines, and the 306 was originally offered with the XUD series diesel engine in both normally aspirated and turbocharged forms. This engine was initially a 1769 cc unit, but its capacity was soon enlarged to 1905 cc. The Indirect Injection XUD Diesel that uses the Ricardo Comet combustion chamber design, is popular for conversion to run on vegetable oil, as long as the Bosch Fuel System is fitted to the engine.

=== Chassis design ===
The familiar range of PSA powertrains drove the front wheels of a conventionally designed chassis. At the front was a standard MacPherson strut layout with anti-roll bar, while the rear used the PSA Peugeot-Citroën independent trailing arm/torsion bar set up that was first introduced on the Peugeot 305 estate. However, PSA's chassis engineers employed some unusual features, including passive rear wheel steering, though less than on the ZX, (by means of specially designed compliance bushes in the rear suspension), and in-house developed and constructed shock absorbers. At high mileages this is prone to wear of the axle mounting bushes which is easily fixed. It is also prone to wear in the rear axle trailing arm bearings, which then wear the trailing arm axle tubes, requiring an expensive rebuild or a replacement axle assembly. The diesel and larger capacity petrol engines are canted as far back as possible in the engine bay, in an effort to put as much weight as possible behind the front axle line, also reducing the centre of gravity, while improving weight distribution and minimising understeer.

=== Versions ===
Trim levels were XN, XL, XR, XT and XS; XN being the most basic, and XT the highest specification. The XT was available in 5-door only, with the XR, XN and XL available in 3-door too. The D-Turbo and XSi were available in both 3- and 5-door, the XS and S16 only available in 3-door. There were no longer "X/G" designations ("X" indicating a 3-door, "G" indicating a 5-door). A diesel model could be identified with the addition of "d" after the spec level, and a turbodiesel with the addition of "dt". There were special edition versions too, badged "Alpine" from 1994. (3-door only).

==== Sedan models ====
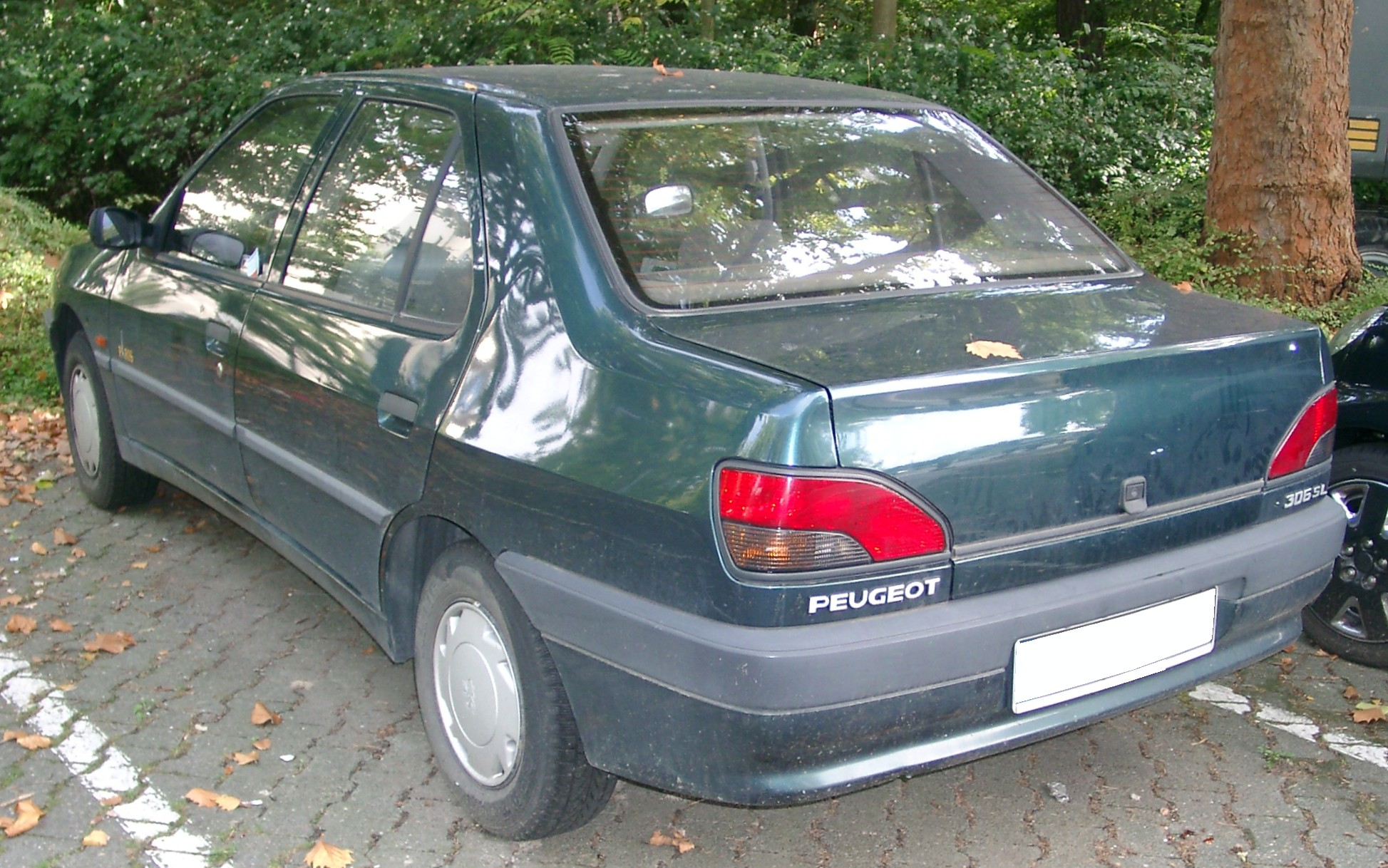
Peugeot 306 Sedan saloon

The sedan specification was marked as SN, SL, SR, and ST.

==== Performance models ====
Peugeot created a D-Turbo "hot hatch" version, which was essentially a petrol XS model with the diesel unit installed. The 306 was not the first mainstream affordable performance diesel, with that plaudit arguably going to the MkII VW Golf GTD of the mid-1980s. Most D-Turbo cars were 3 door models, but there are a few rare examples of the 5-door D-Turbo.

The D-Turbo and XS variants were fitted as standard with front fog lights, body-coloured bumpers with deeper spoilers, sports seats and different steering wheel, and a wider, chromed exhaust tailpipe; 14-inch alloy wheels were an optional extra. The models fitted somewhere between the XR and XT variants in terms of standard equipment.

The XSi 8v 2.0 Petrol had the addition of subtle side skirts. 15-inch five spoke alloy wheels were available as an option when the model was launched, and became standard shortly after.

The S16 (for 'soupape-16', or '16-valve') was a 3-door Phase 1-only model, replaced with the more powerful GTI-6 in 1996. The engines in both cars were 16-valve XU-series units with Magneti Marelli fuel injection. As well as gaining a close-ratio 6-speed gearbox over the S16's 5-speed, the GTI-6 had more power courtesy of a reworked 167 bhp XU10J4RS engine replacing the S16's 155 bhp XU10J4 ACAV, and some subtle chassis revisions. As well as being more powerful, the GTI-6 engine had more flexible power delivery with more mid-range torque than that in the S16, and the new gearbox made it easier to use the engine more effectively. The GTI-6 was introduced as a Phase 1 model and was to last until the end of 2000. It received Phase 2 and 3 cosmetic and electrical updates alongside the rest of the range, but the engine and mechanical specification remained largely unchanged.

== 306 Phase 2 ==
Phase 2 (N5)
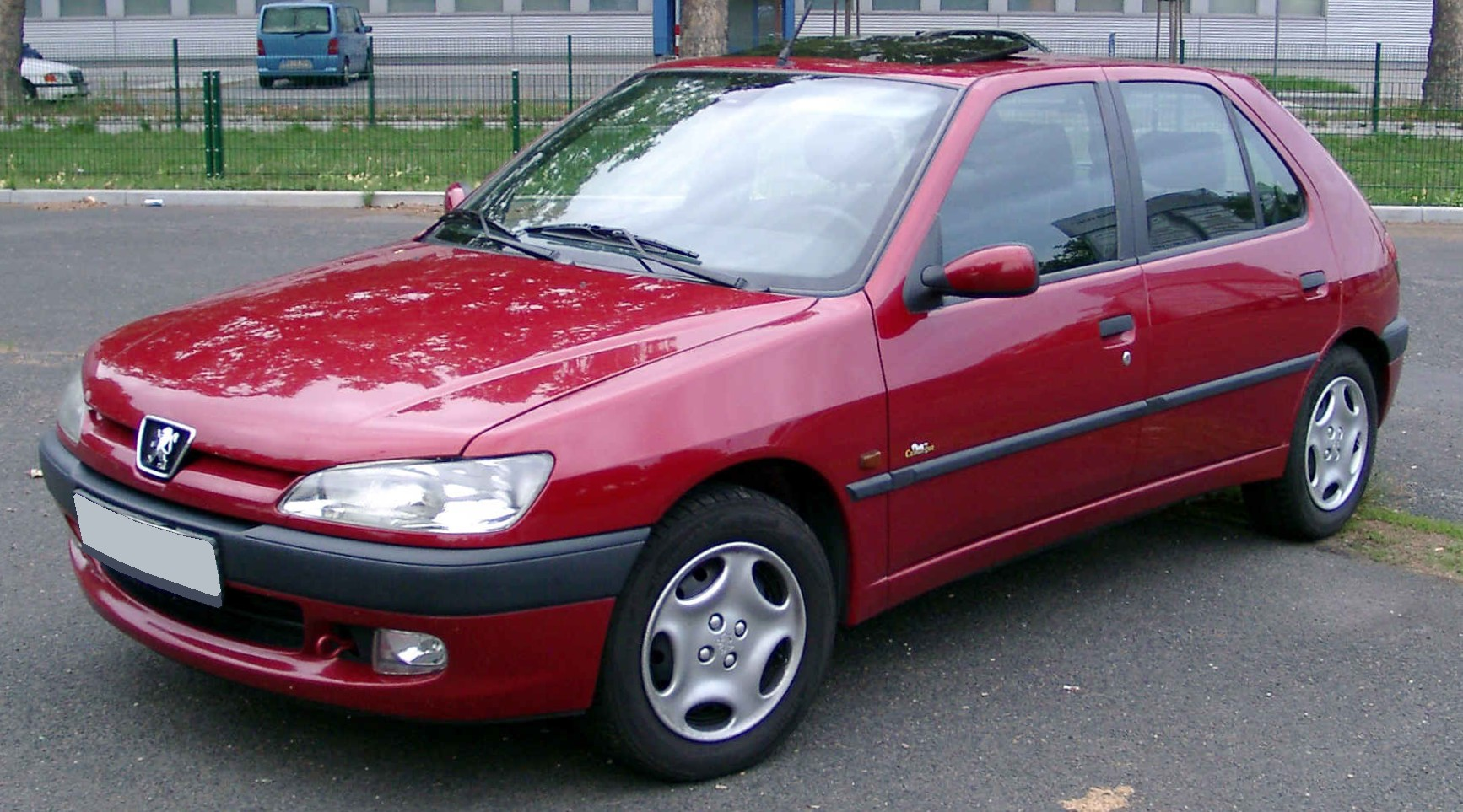

Overview
- Production: 1997–1999

Powertrain
- Engine: Petrol: 1360 cc TU3 I4; 1587 cc TU5 I4; 1761 cc XU7 I4 (automatic); 1761 cc XU7 JP4 16V I4; 1998 cc XU10 J4 16V I4; Diesel: 1905 cc XUD9 I4; 1905 cc XUD9 TE TD I4

The 306 underwent the only major revamp of its life in May 1997, with the launch of the "Phase 2" version (N5 in Australia). The basic shape remained the same, but lights, grille and bumpers were redesigned in an effort to bring the styling into line with the new, more rounded, Peugeot family look established with the Peugeot 406. Indicator lamps were incorporated into the headlamp unit and the new style "block filled" Peugeot lion logo was adopted. The Phase 2 also saw the addition of an estate version.

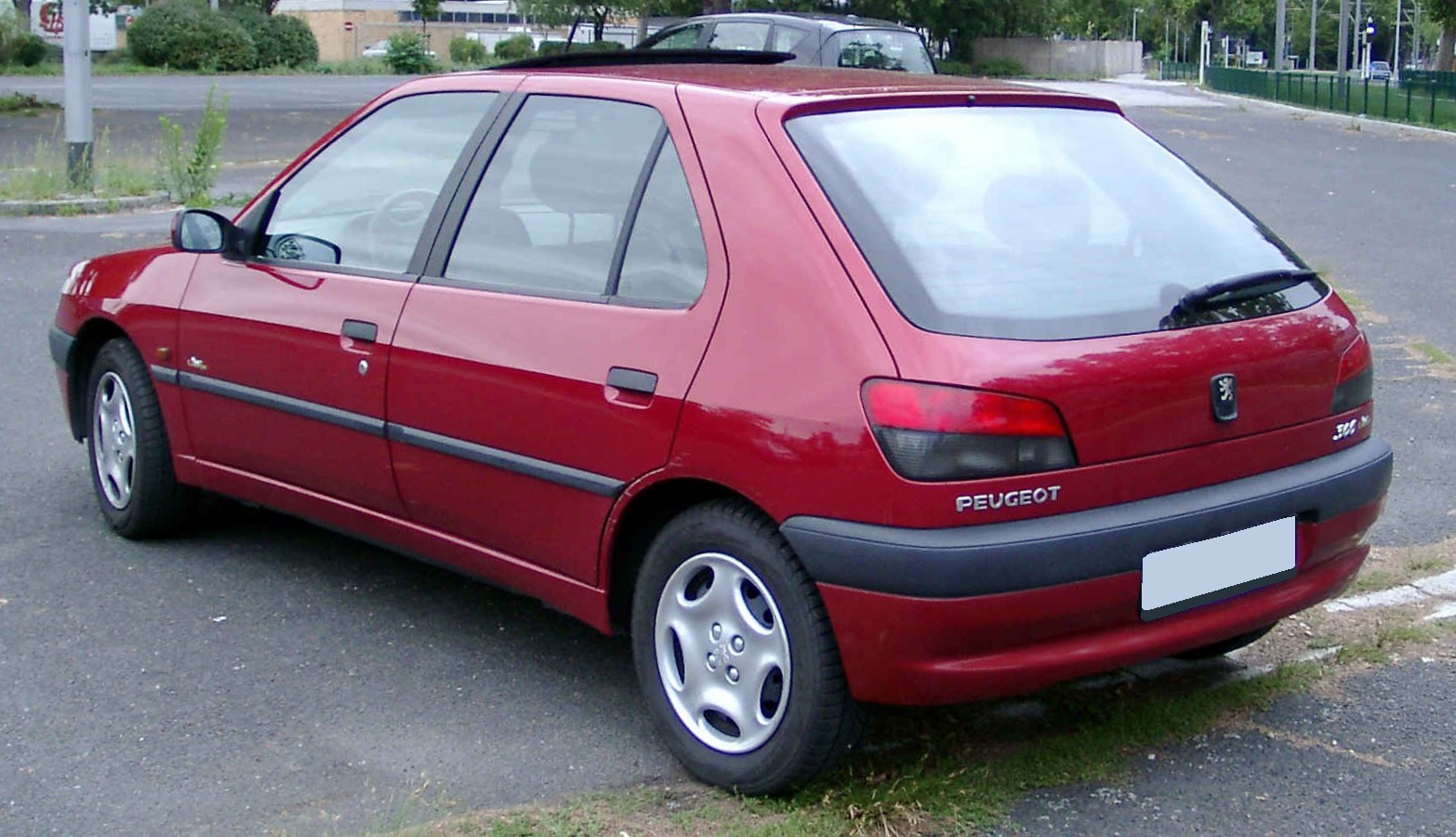
Phase 2 Peugeot 306 rear

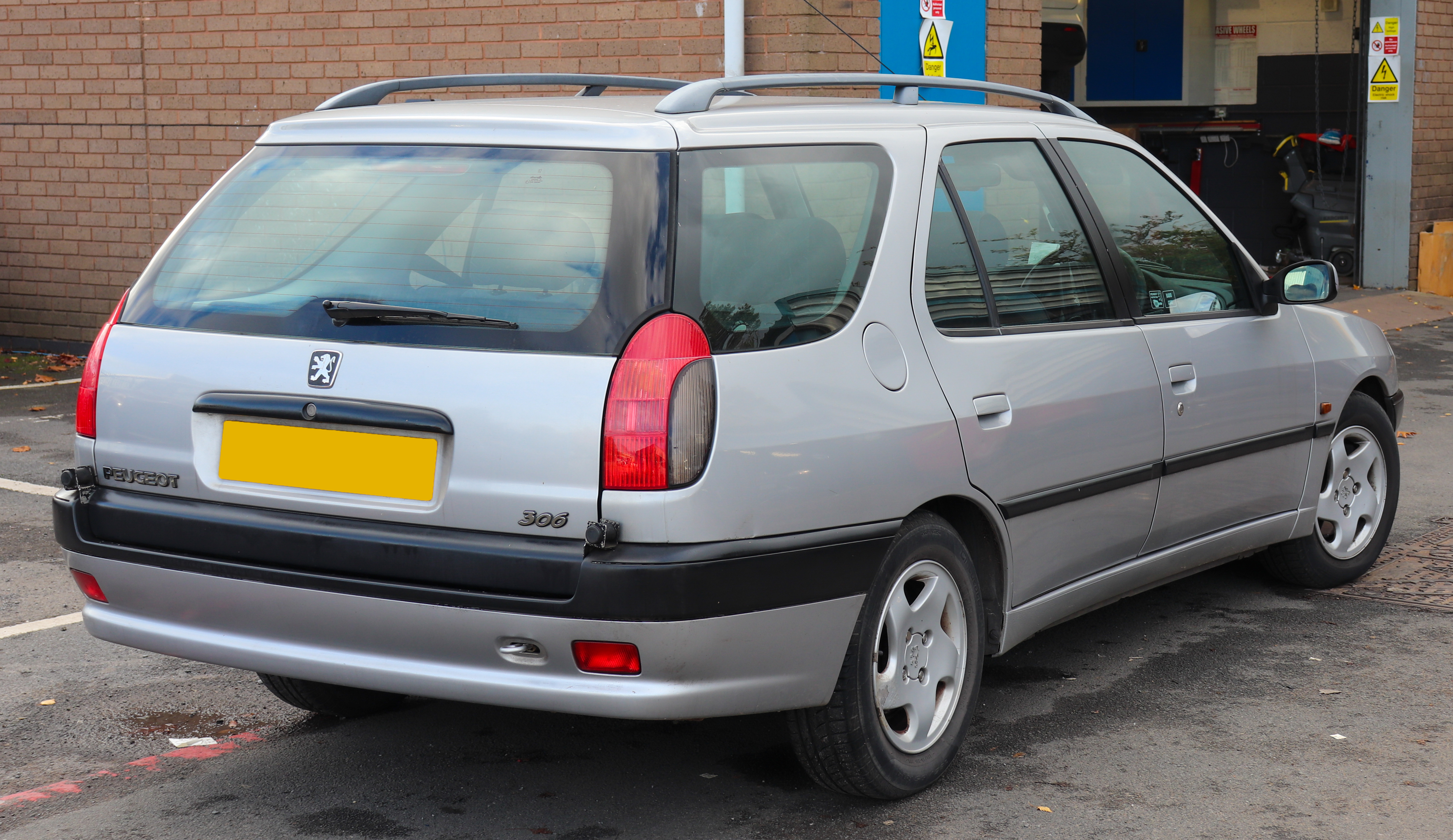
Phase 2 Peugeot 306 break

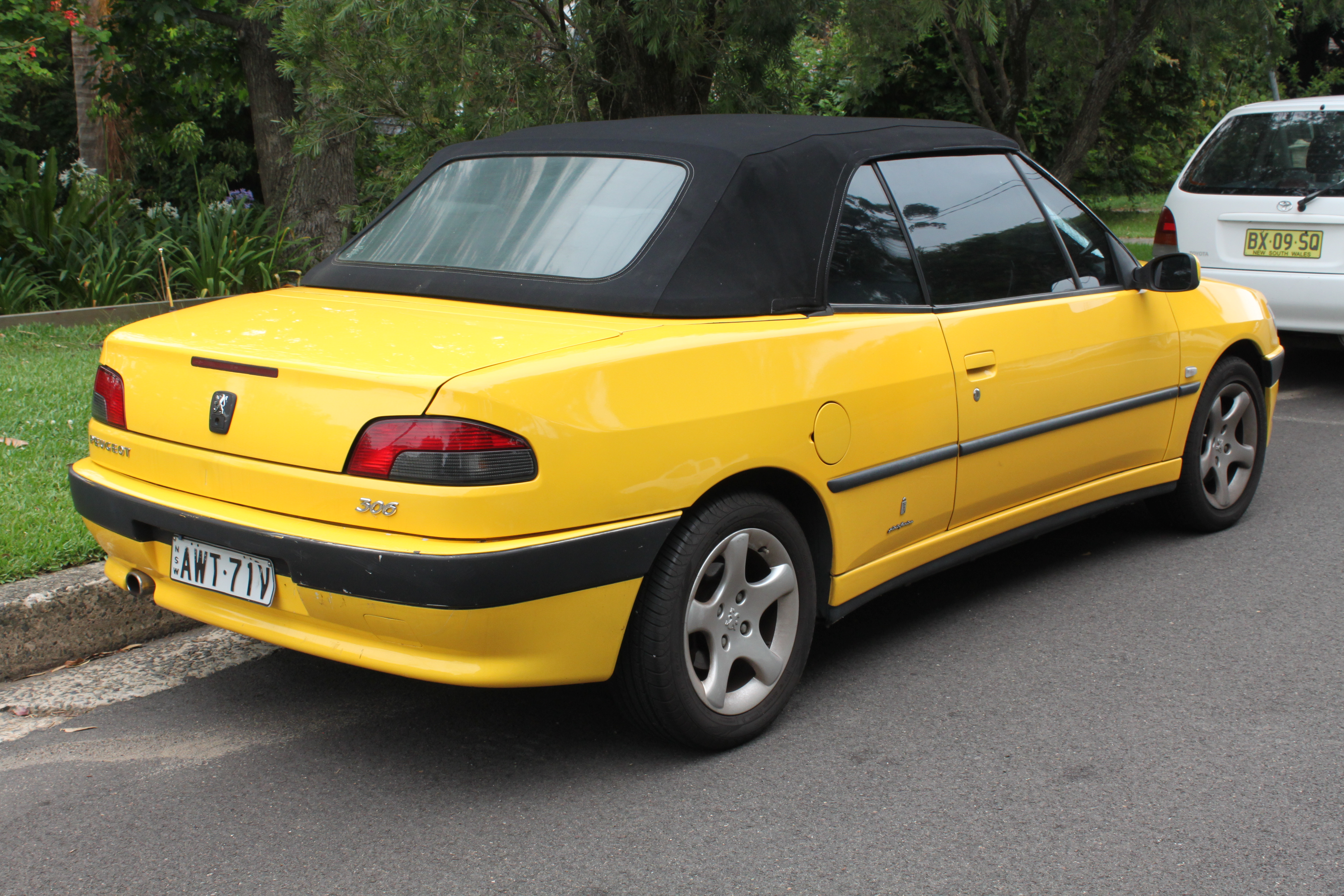
1999–2002 Peugeot 306 (N5) cabriolet, Australia

A new-style typeface for the car's model number was adopted on the tailgate, removing the black plastic backing. There were also some changes to the dashboard layout, including a digital odometer, and trim quality which freshened up the car in the face of increasingly stiff competition from other manufacturers. New engines were also offered, with both 1.8 and 2.0 petrol engines gaining 16-valve cylinder heads together with modest power increases. At this time, the previous trim designations were replaced by L, LX & GLX for the UK market. XS, XSi and GTI-6 models continued as before, but with the Phase 2 headlight, grille, bumper and other cosmetic updates alongside the rest of the range.

Cars from 1998 onwards (1999 model year) received further enhancements, including an aluminium-effect centre console on certain versions and a chrome Peugeot logo on the steering wheel. Other updates included removal of the black strip on the bootlid, colour-coded bumpers on some models and new upholstery in the cabin. New models also appeared in Phase 2 trim.

=== Markets ===
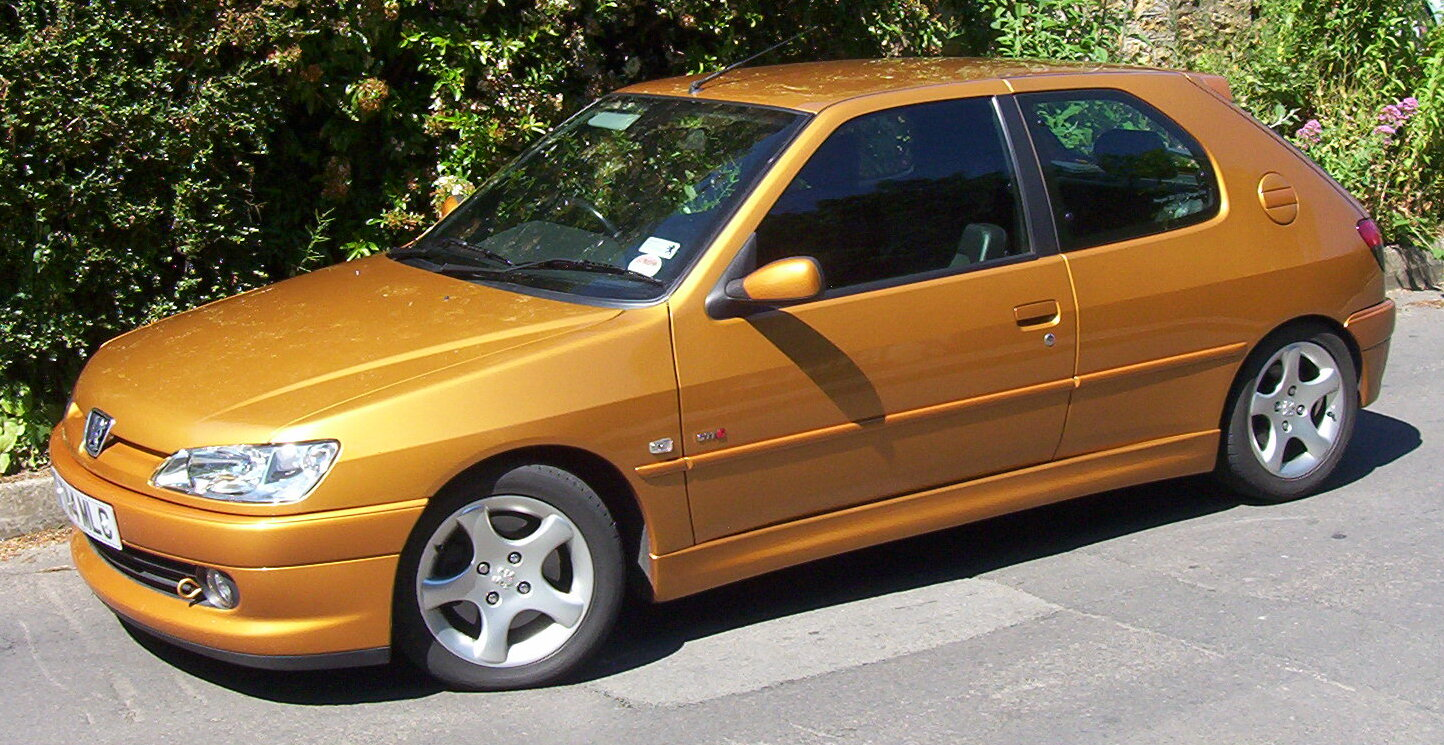
Peugeot 306 GTI-6

==== Europe ====
Eighty Phase 2 306 S16s entered service with the French National Gendarmerie's Rapid Intervention Brigade from 1997 onwards, replacing a fleet of Peugeot 405 T16 sedans. Among other modifications for traffic police use on France's autoroutes, the 306s were modified to have a singular flashing light on the roof, an additional mirror in the interior, and were fitted with standard Gendarmerie vehicle markings on top of the specialist 'Gendarmerie Blue' offered by Peugeot at the time. The Gendarmerie's Peugeot 306 S16s were eventually replaced by the Subaru Impreza WRX in 2006.

===== United Kingdom =====
Peugeot 306 Rallye

Sold only in the UK, the Rallye was launched in 1998 using the mechanicals from the GTI-6, but with less standard equipment (manual windows and mirrors, no air-con, Rallye-specific cloth instead of leather and Alcantara, front spot lights removed, less sound deadening, no sunroof), making it 65 kg (143 lb) lighter than the GTI-6. Sold at a discounted price of £15,995 (over £2000 less than a GTI-6), it only came in three colours - Black, Cherry Red and Bianca White. Either 500 or 501 were produced; 100 in black, 200 in Cherry Red, 200 in Bianca White and possibly one in Dragoon Blue. Seat upholstery was cloth in a specific Rallye pattern. As the production of the Rallye straddled the Phase 2 and 3 models, some Rallyes had superficial Phase 3 features such as the flush glass tailgate and slightly different bonnet, but remained fundamentally a Phase 2 model in such characteristics as the fuse box and electrical layout. The UK Rallye is different from the 2001 Australian market N5 Rallye, which was based on the 5-door XT model. In 1998 Peugeot launched a SP version - this denotes "sport pack", and there are three levels of equipment.

The Meridian model (originally a special edition) was also relaunched in 1999 and boasted a generous equipment list including new half-leather seats, and further cosmetic upgrades to the interior.

==== North America ====
===== Mexico =====
The 306 saloon was introduced in 1998 after Peugeot entered to the Mexican market.

== 306 Phase 3 ==
Phase 3
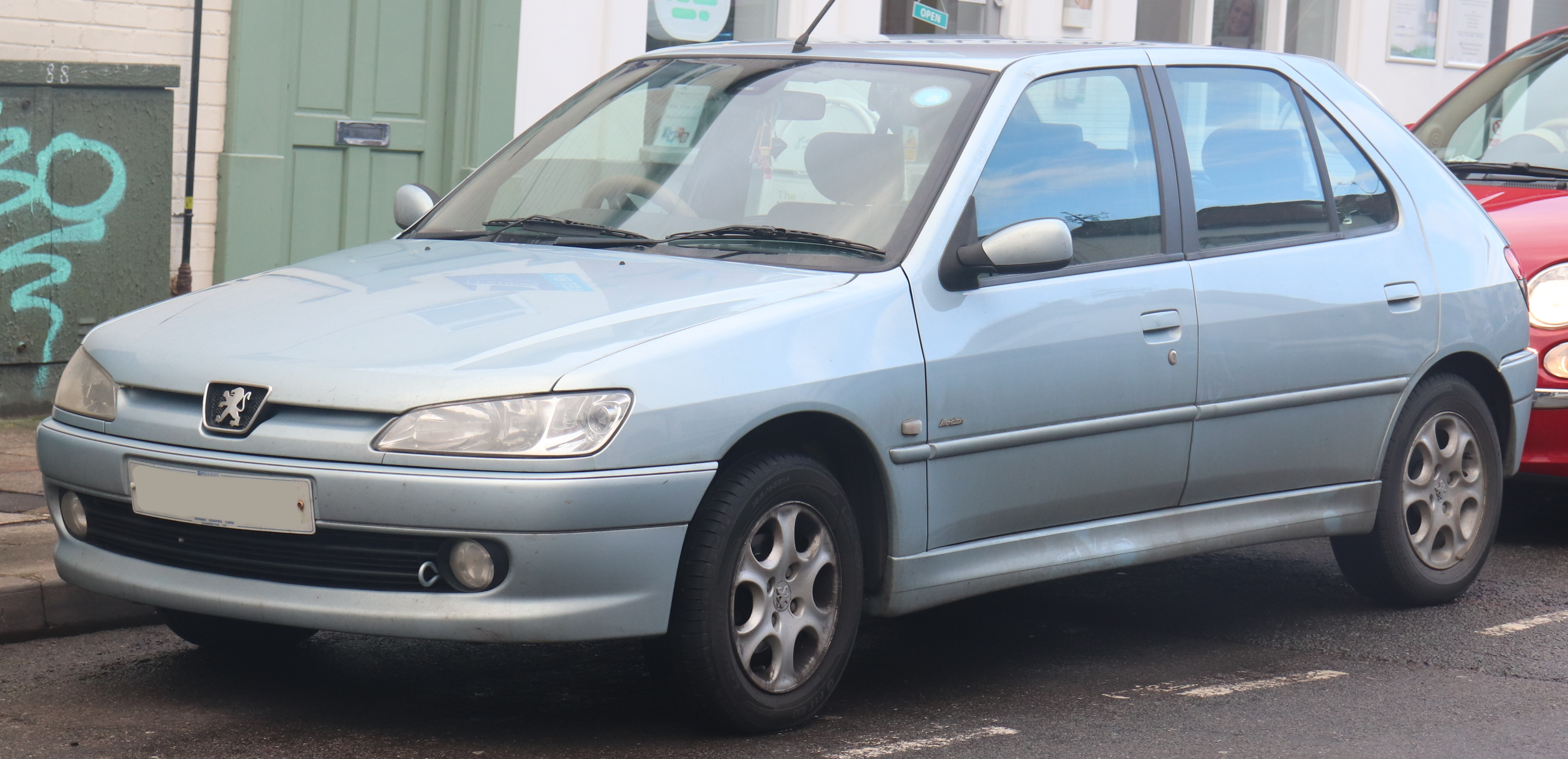

Overview
- Production: 1999–2002

Powertrain
- Engine: Petrol: 1360 cc TU3 I4; 1587 cc TU5 I4; 1761 cc XU7 JP4 16V I4; 1998 cc XU10 J4 16V I4; Diesel: 1868 cc DW8A I4; 1997 cc DW10A HDi I4

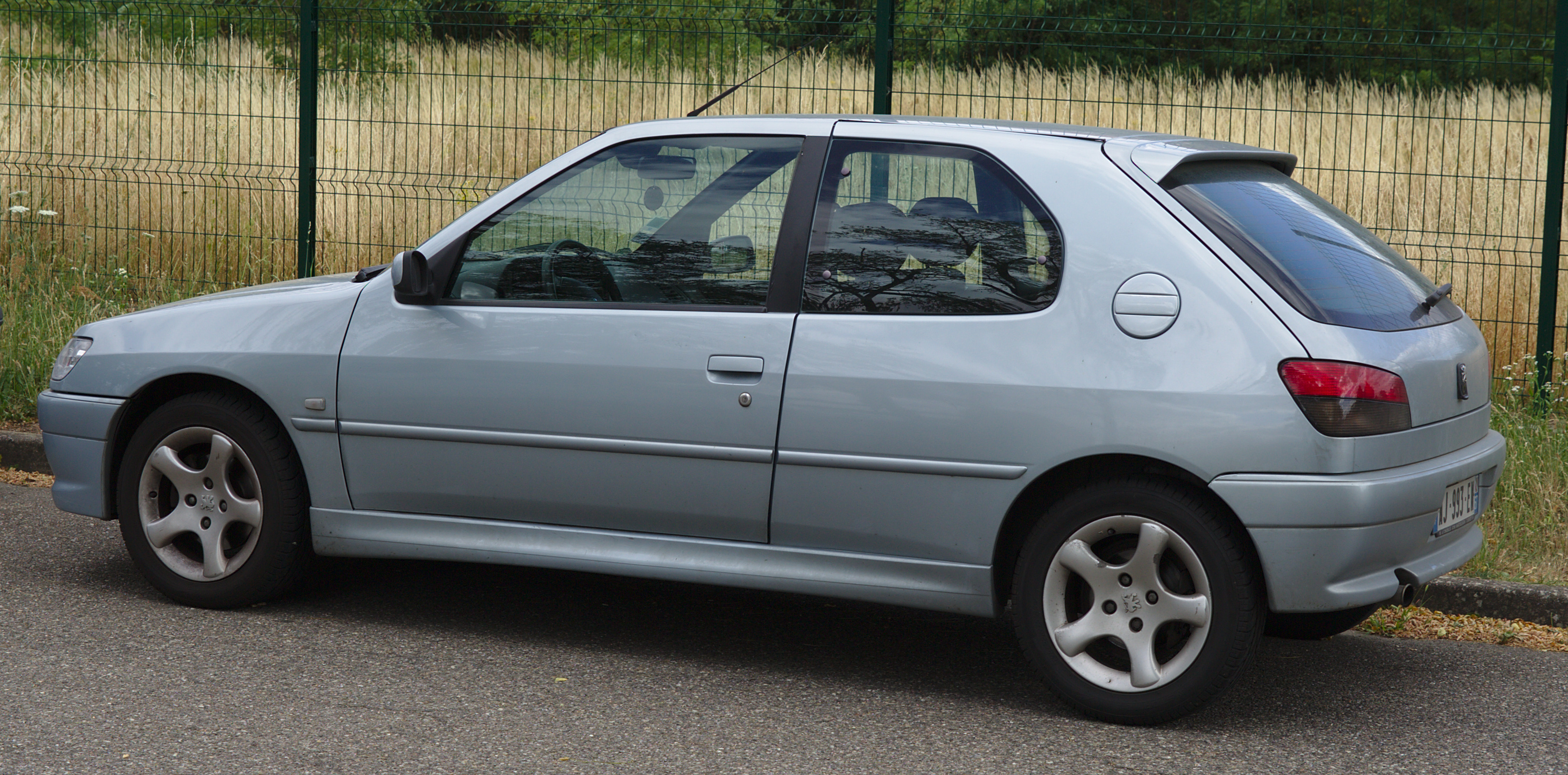
Phase 3 Peugeot 306 3-door

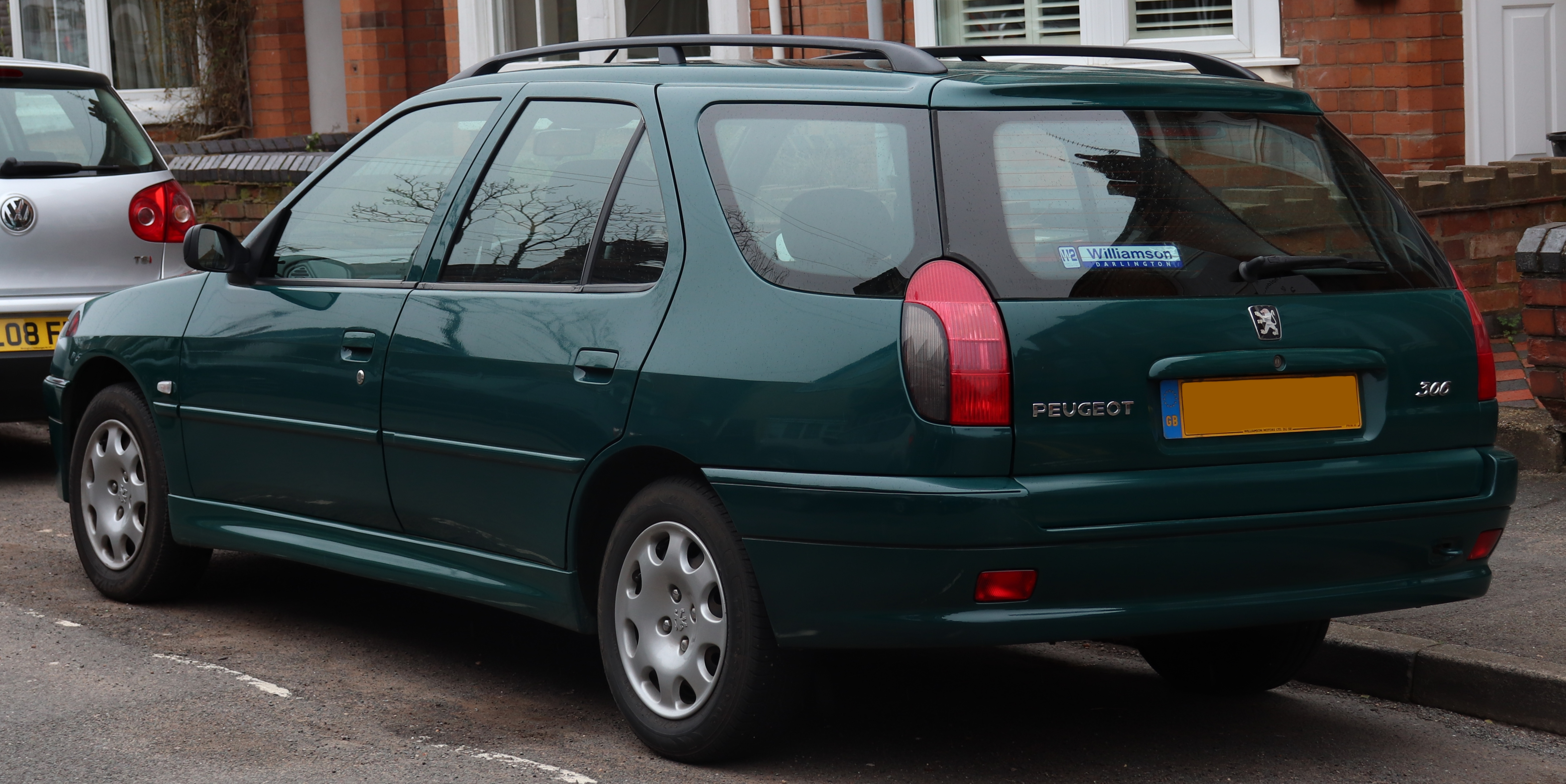
Peugeot 306 Break

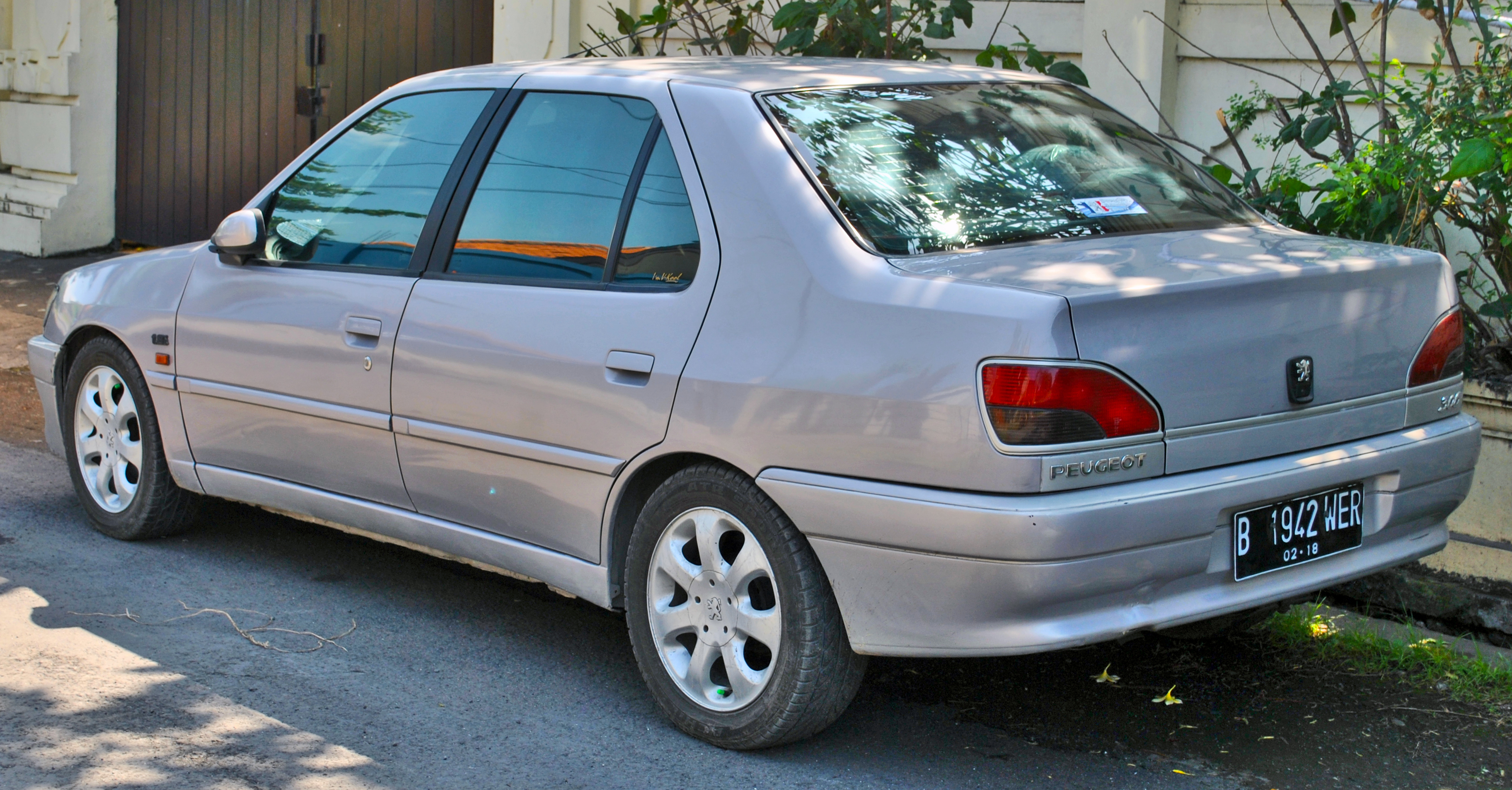
Peugeot 306 sedan

Models from mid-1999 saw further improvements and exterior modifications, including clear lenses on the headlamps, round and clear lensed foglamps, complete colour-coding of the exterior trim, removal of the black plastic strip on the lower edge of the tailgate, flush glass seal to rear windscreen, a redesigned tailgate rear badge, different rear wiper and new paint colours. Interior upgrades were more minor, with the gearknob becoming rounder and silver topped, while the instrument binnacle received a silver background and white instrument needles in place of the previous red versions.

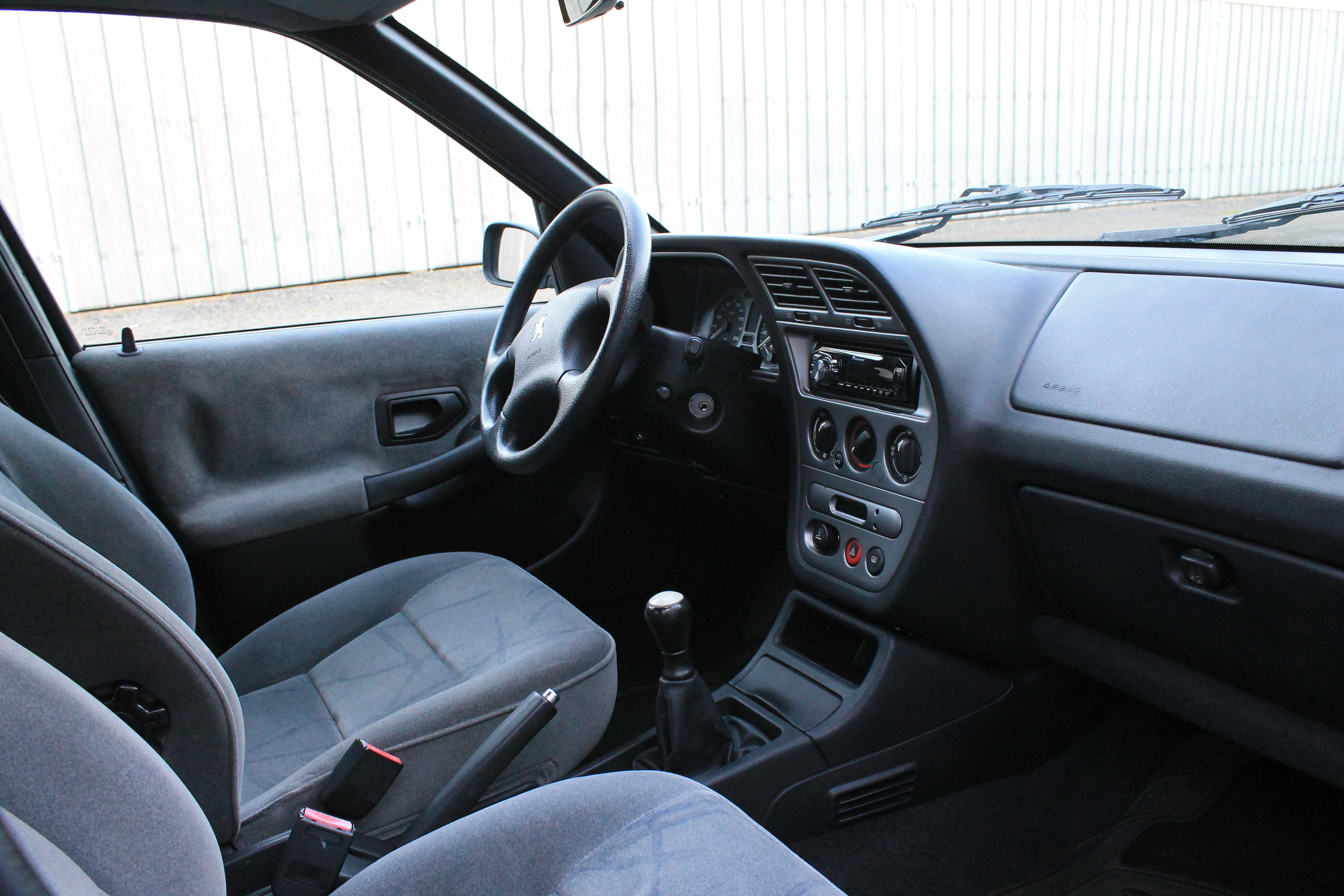
Interior

XSi, XT and D Turbo models all received the GTi-6's bodykit and interior styling additions but not the cyclone alloy wheels. In the diesel variants, the ageing XUD engine was replaced by the newer, HDi engine, which featured common rail injection. Some base models made use of the DW8 normally aspirated diesel engine. Almost all models included ABS and multiple airbags as standard equipment. Rain sensitive automatic windscreen wipers were also standard on all but the base spec.

== The end of the line ==
Despite Peugeot's efforts, the car placed poorly in a variety of ownership and customer satisfaction surveys of the time, such as the annual JD Power survey which was run in association with the BBC Top Gear television programme. Nevertheless, the car featured in the Top 10 Best Selling Cars In Britain from 1994 to 1998, only narrowly missing out on the top 10 during its final three years on sale. Sales in France and most of the rest of Europe were also strong.

In Australia, a run-out model was introduced in early 2001. Based on the N5 XT 5-door model, it was called the 306 Rallye. As with other XT variants, it had the same 99 kW/132 bhp engine and 5-speed gearbox as the late XSI models but different (less sporty) suspension and interior trim. It was also available in automatic. It replaced the XT model in the lineup and was discounted by AU$2000. This model was different from the 306 Rallye sold in the UK in 1998 - 99, which was a 3-door car based on the 306 GTI-6.

The hatchback 306 was discontinued in 2001 to make way for its replacement, the Peugeot 307. The cabriolet and estate variants both remained on sale until 2002. The slow-selling saloon was axed from the United Kingdom market in 1999, but it was still available in the rest of Europe until 2002.

== Motorsport ==
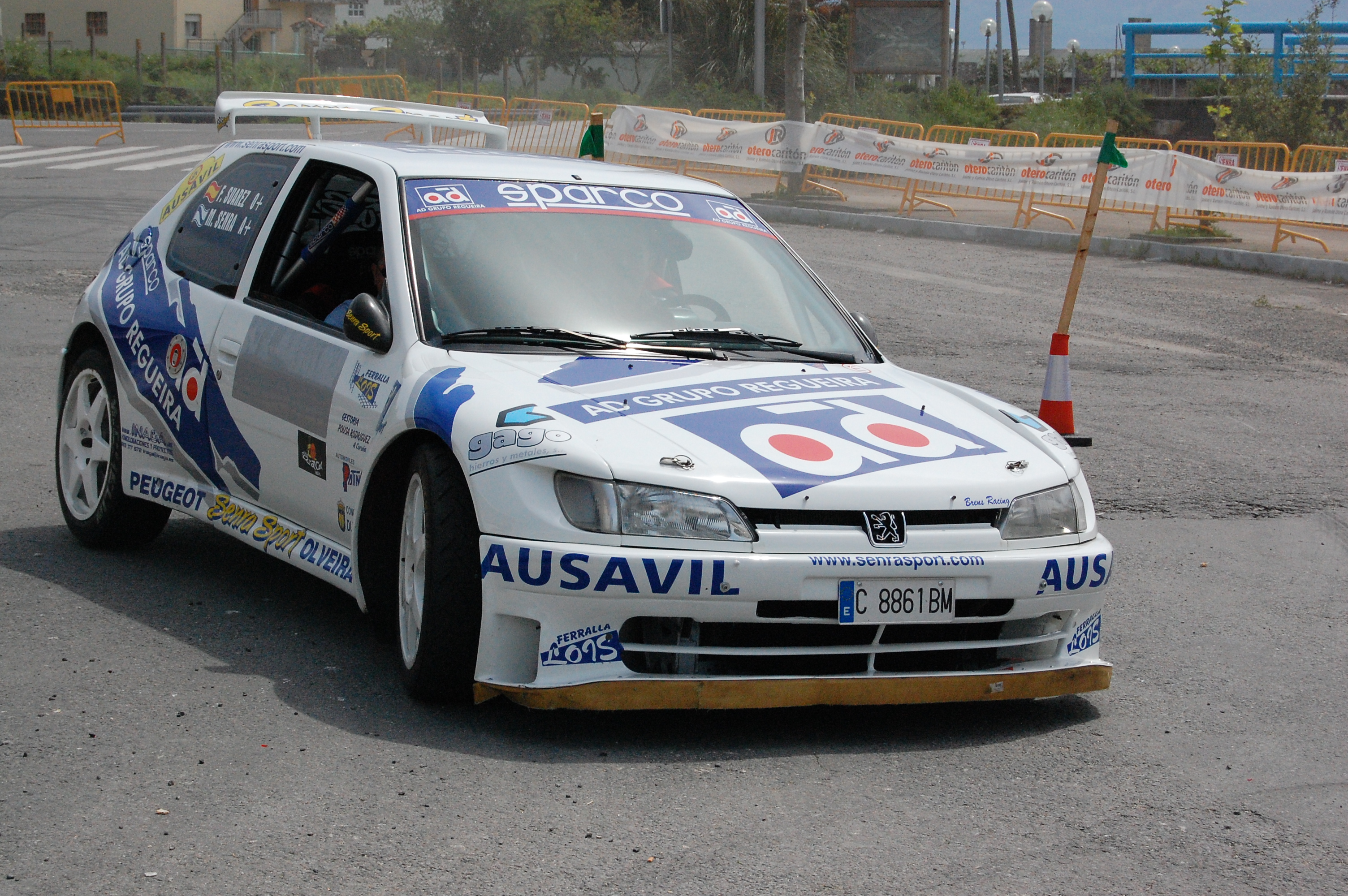
Peugeot 306 Maxi

The Peugeot 306 Maxi competed in Group A of the French and World Rally Championship. The GTI version of the car also won the Spa 24 hours endurance race in 1999 and 2000.

The car took the Danish Touringcar Championship in 1999, 2000 and 2001, and the Asian Touring Car Series title in 2000, 2001 and 2002.

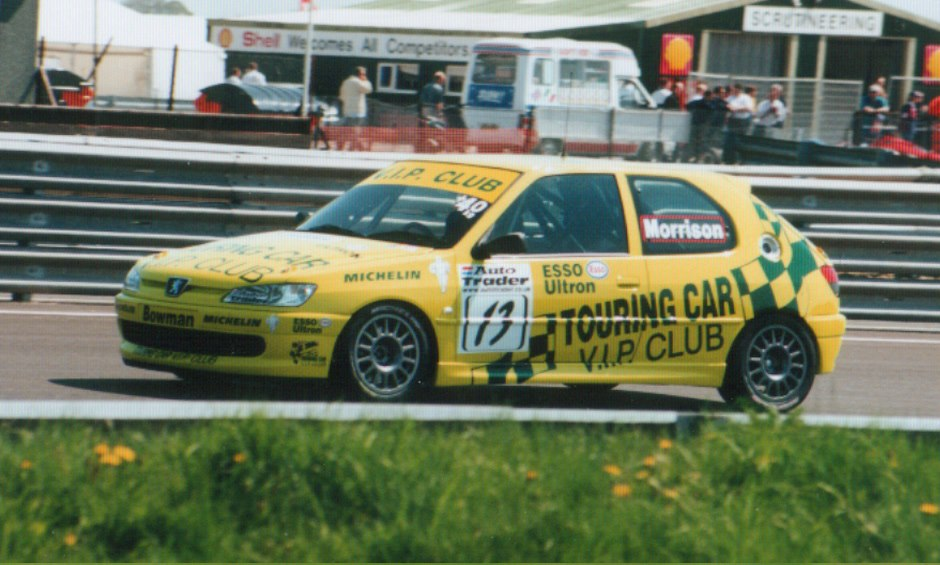
Alan Morrison driving the "VIP Touring Car Club" Peugeot 306 GTi

The Peugeot 306 GTi was a common car in the BTCC from 2000 to 2003. In 2000, the entry of one 306 GTi was that of Alan Morrison driving for Vic Lee Racing in Class B, which was made up of smaller and slower cars. He finished first in class (12th overall) in the first race at Brands Hatch. Morrison gained a lead over James Kaye. By the end of the season, he had 13 wins in his class and that had just given him the win with the 306 with 264 points, just 4 points ahead of Kaye with 260 points. Other entries included Will Hoy, Lee Linford, Toni Ruokonen and Dan Eaves. The other 306 drivers for the team: Hoy, Linford, Ruokonen and Eaves, all scored points. Ruokonen and Eaves both scored podium finishes.

In 2001, saw more entries of the 306 GTi. Two HTML-sponsored 306s were entered for the season in the Production class with Norwegian driver Roger Moen, and Simon Harrison. Harrison and Moen finished in a 1-2 formation in the first race. Roger took another second place in race two. On many occasions, the duo finished close together in almost every race. After eleven podium finishes between them, they finished 1st and 3rd in the championship standings with Simon Harrison having 227 points and Roger Moen, 212 points. Tech-Speed Motorsport entered two 306s with Paul O'Neill and Annie Templeton at the wheel. O'Neill's best finish was a second in class (6th overall), Templeton's was a 6th in class (11th overall). O'Neill finished 8th with 74 points and Templeton 19th with 21 points. Tom Boardman entered the season with his own 306 as well. Boardman's season was not rough; his best finish was a third place in class (7th overall). Boardman finished the season 11th in the standings, with 66 points.

== Safety ==
In 1998, Euro NCAP tested the 306, and it scored three out of five stars for protection of the adult occupants. This was a competitive performance as the 1999 Ford Escort only achieved two stars, but the newly introduced 1999 Ford Focus and 1998 Vauxhall/Opel Astra scored four stars.

In the 2006 Australian Used Car Safety Ratings, the Peugeot 306 manufactured between 1994 and 2001 was rated "significantly better than average" in its ability to protect its occupants in the event of a crash. This was one of the highest results achieved in the 2006 ratings.

Australian Used Car Safety Ratings (UCSR) gave the Peugeot 306 a 4-star rating (out of 5 stars) for driver and occupant safety, and an "excellent" rating for other road users involved in accidents. UCSRs are based on statistics collected from car crashes involving death or serious injury in Australia and New Zealand between 1990 and 2013. Over seven million police reported crashes were analysed in the latest UCSR. Ratings reflect the relative safety of vehicles in preventing severe injury. Driver protection ratings indicate relative safety of vehicles in preventing severe injury to their own drivers, whilst protection for other road user ratings indicate how well the vehicle protects other road users with which they collide.
