= Peugeot 309 =

Small family car produced by Peugeot (1985–1994)

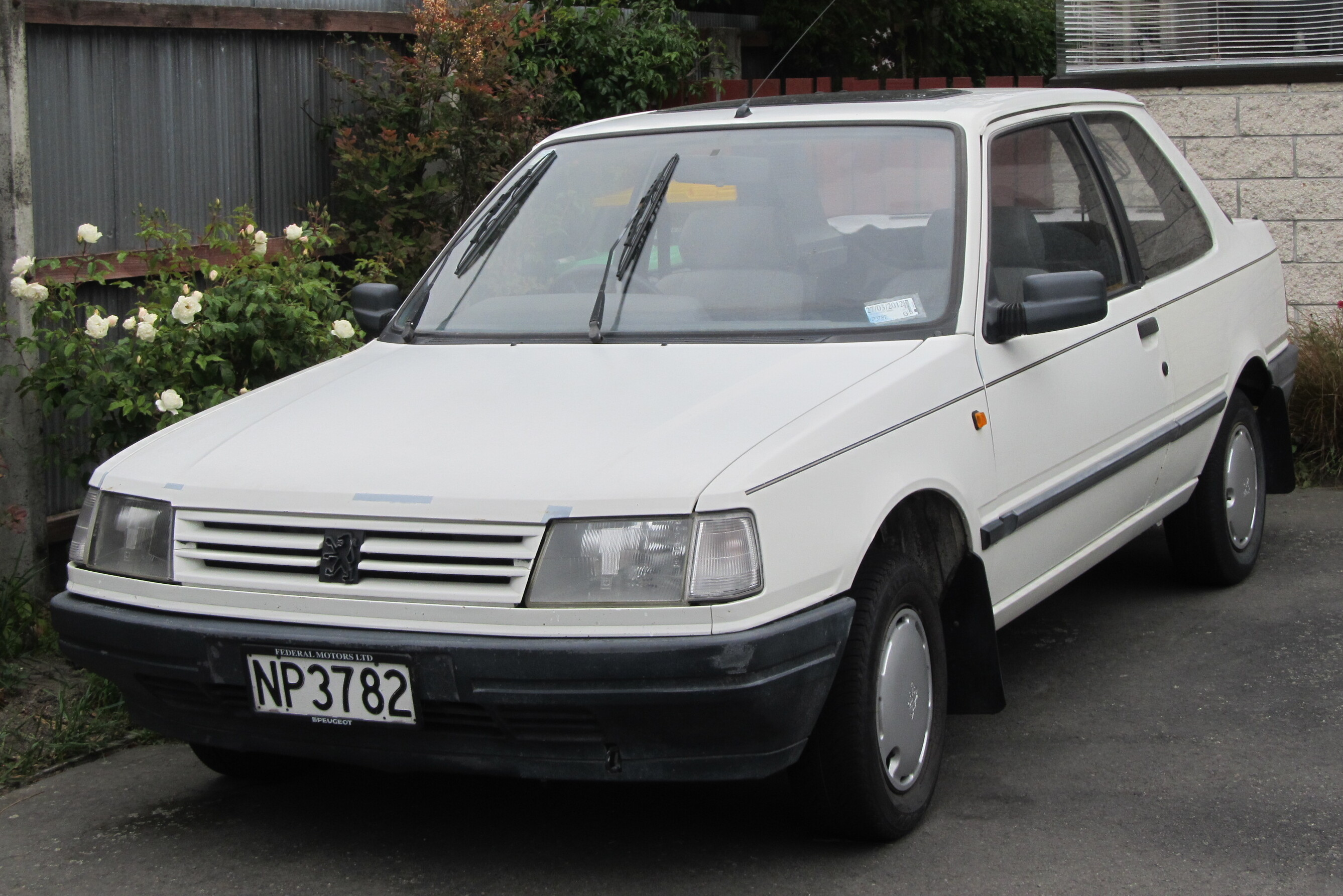
- 1988 309 XL

Overview
- Manufacturer: Peugeot
- Production: 1985–1994; 1995–1997 (India)
- Assembly: France: Poissy (Poissy plant); Spain: Villaverde; United Kingdom: Ryton-on-Dunsmore (Ryton plant); Chile: Los Andes (Automotores Franco Chilena S.A.); India: Kalyan (Premier); Taiwan: Dacun (Yǔtián)

Body and chassis
- Class: Small family car (C)
- Body style: 3/5-door hatchback/liftback
- Layout: FF layout
- Related: Peugeot 205

Powertrain
- Engine: Petrol: 1118 cc E1A OHV I4; 1124 cc TU1 I4; 1294 cc G1A I4; 1360 cc TU3 I4; 1580 cc XU5 I4; 1905 cc XU9 I4; Diesel: 1769 cc XUD7 I4; 1769 cc XUD7 turbodiesel I4; 1905 cc XUD9 I4
- Transmission: 4-speed manual; 5-speed manual; 3-speed automatic; 4-speed ZF 4HP14 automatic

Dimensions
- Wheelbase: 2,470 mm (97.2 in)
- Length: 4,050 mm (159.4 in)
- Width: 1,630 mm (64.2 in)
- Height: 1,380 mm (54.3 in)

Chronology
- Predecessor: Chrysler-Talbot Horizon; Peugeot 305
- Successor: Peugeot 306

The Peugeot 309 is a small family car that was manufactured between 1985 and 1994 in France, England and Spain by PSA Peugeot Citroën. It was originally intended to be badged as a Talbot and, as development progressed, to be called the Talbot Arizona.

It was the replacement for the Talbot Horizon, which had started life as a Chrysler in Britain and a Simca in France, and was also being built in several guises for the market in America. In 1985, the PSA Group decided to discontinue the Talbot brand, with the last passenger vehicle branded as a Talbot to be launched being the Samba of 1981, and to market the car as a Peugeot instead.

The Talbot brand was phased out completely when Talbot Express production stopped in 1994.

== History ==
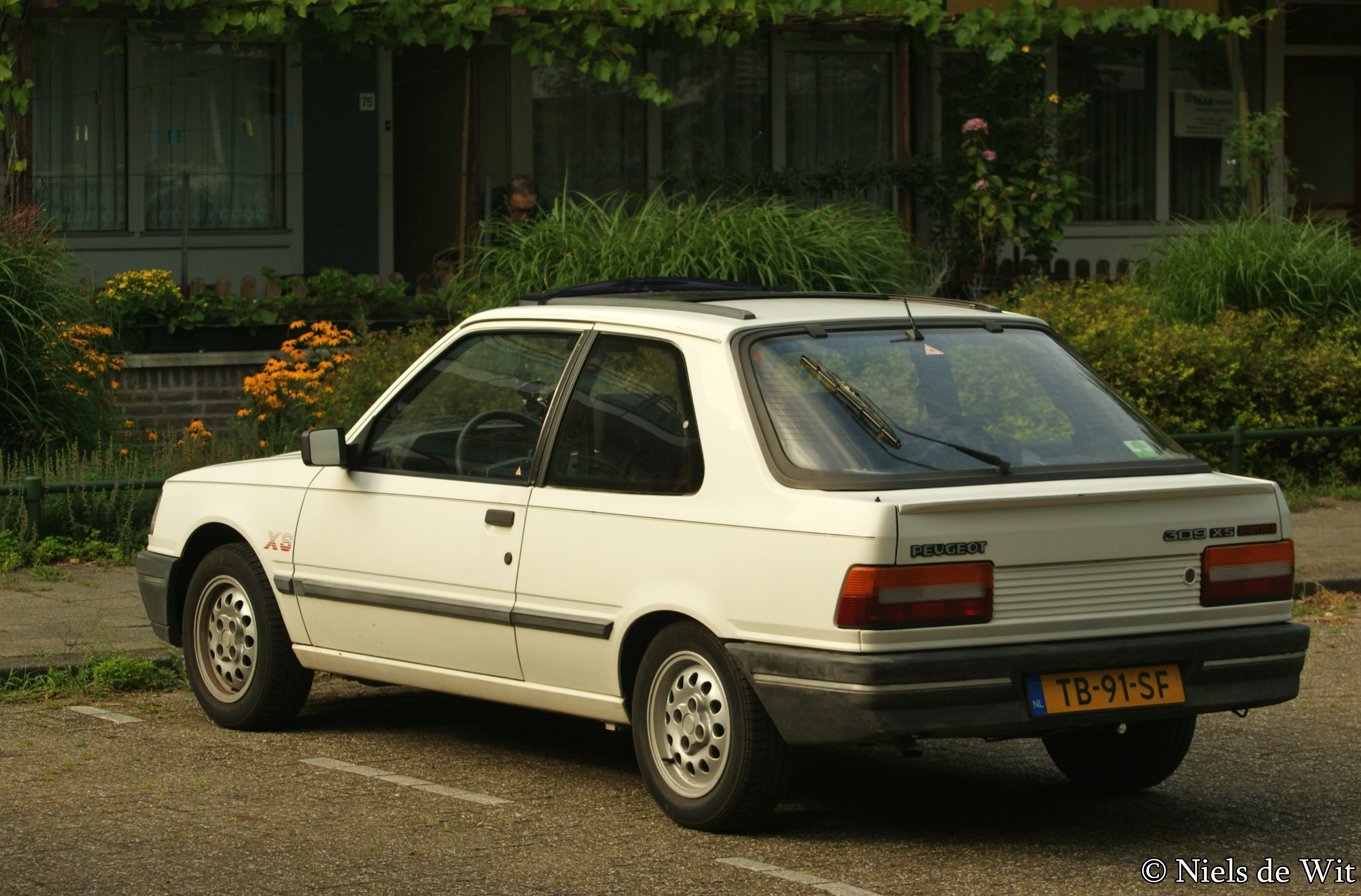
Peugeot 309 XS Injection (rear)

The 309 had been conceived as Projet C28 as a replacement for the Talbot Horizon, and as a result its development had been performed by the former Chrysler/Simca wing of PSA. Styling was the responsibility of the former Chrysler-Rootes design studios in Coventry, whilst much of the engineering was done at the Simca site at Poissy in France.

The only stipulation from PSA management was that the new car had to use as much existing architecture as possible; hence the use of a stretched Peugeot 205 floorpan and door shells, whilst the Simca engines and transmissions from the Horizon were also carried over.

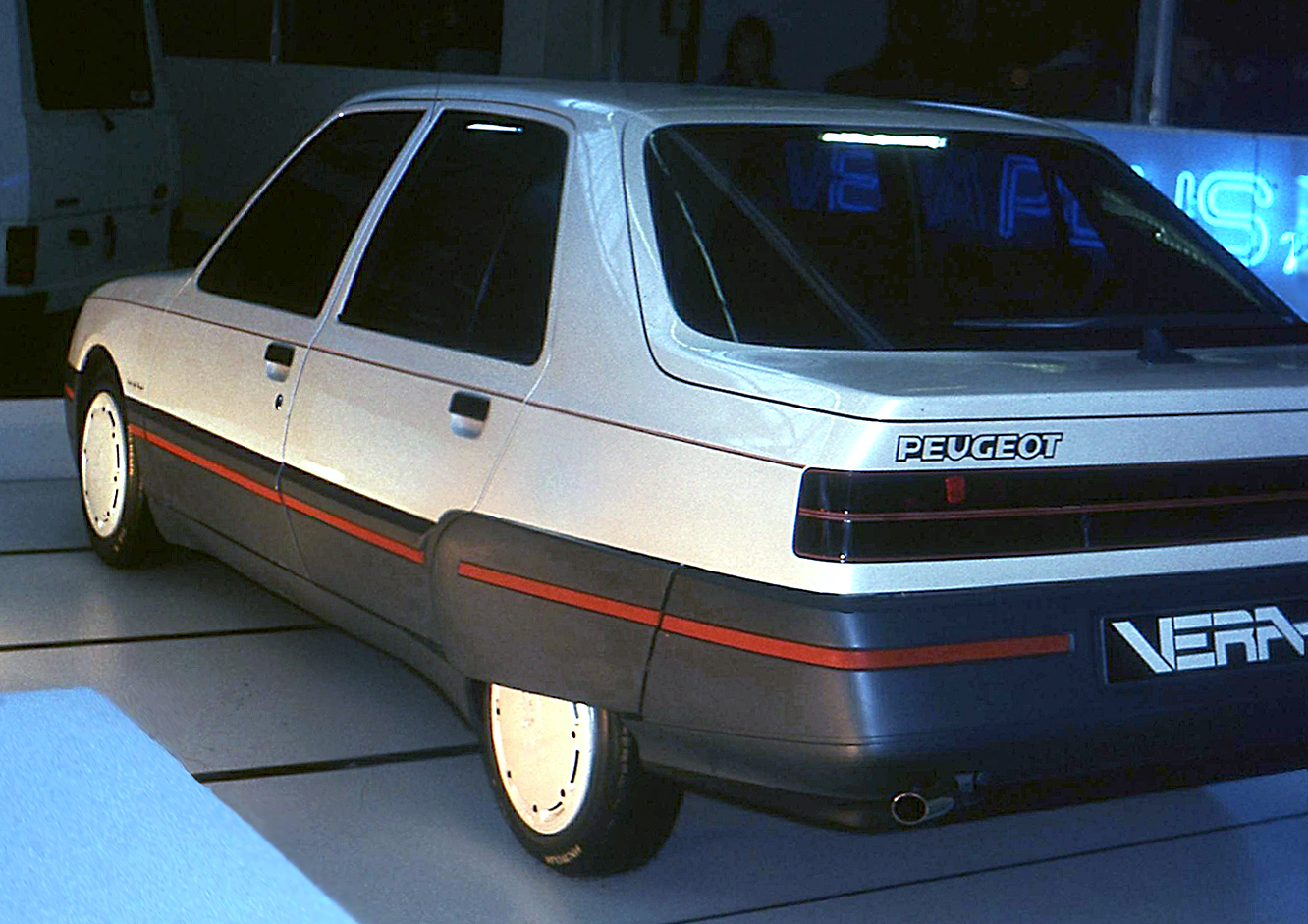
1982 Peugeot VERA Plus

The 309's design was presaged by the 1982 Peugeot VERA Plus (followed by the VERA Profil in 1985), which were aerodynamic studies developed by Peugeot at the time. The VERA Plus claimed a very low drag coefficient of Cd=0.22. Many of the aerodynamic features from the VERA studies found their way into later production Peugeots.

Production in France began at the former Simca plant in Poissy in the end of summer 1985, with the first French customers getting their cars in October of that year; but it was decided that RHD models would be built at the Ryton plant near Coventry, which had previously been owned by the Rootes Group and then Chrysler Europe before Peugeot took it over in 1978.

The first 309 for the British market rolled off the production line at Ryton in October 1985, and sales began the beginning of 1986, although left-hand drive sales of the Poissy built models began in France in October 1985. The only bodywork available originally was the five-door hatchback.

The 309 was not intended to replace Peugeot's own model, the 305, but the out of step model number (the next small family car after the 305 should have been named "306" which eventually launched in 1993) was intended to distance it from the larger 305 in the marketplace and to reflect the car's Simca origins. It was also the first Peugeot badged hatchback of this size. With the Talbot brand being phased out on passenger cars, the 309 would succeed the Talbot Horizon. Peugeot had been considering a new Talbot Samba based on the forthcoming Citroën AX supermini, but the success of the Peugeot 205 meant that there was little need for a third supermini within the PSA combine, and so the Samba was discontinued in 1986 with no replacement. The larger Alpine hatchback and Solara saloons were also axed in 1986, a year before Peugeot began production of the similar sized 405, successor to the 305.

The 309's slightly awkward styling (especially when compared with the 205 and 405 of the same era) was due to the decision to reuse the door shells from the 205. The 309 was also originally intended to be differentiated from Peugeot as a Talbot, and was designed "inhouse". Other Peugeot cars of the time were designed by the famed Italian design house Pininfarina, up until the introduction of the 206 in 1998. The notched hatchback design bears an unintentional similarity to the Dodge Shadow and Plymouth Sundance, which were also developed (entirely separately and cut down from a larger [Chrysler K-Car] platform rather than stretched from a smaller one) to replace the Horizon in North America.

The initial engine line up in the United Kingdom market consisted of the chain driven Simca derived 1118 cc (E1A) and 1294 cc (G1A) overhead valve petrol units from the Horizon, and Peugeot provided 1580/1905 cc petrol belt driven overhead camshaft XU units. Spanish-built cars also used the 1442 cc (Y2) and 1592 cc (J2) "Poissy engine", as seen previously in the Simca 1307 and Solara as well as the Horizon, instead of the 1580 cc OHC.

In July 1986 the first diesels arrived, the 1905 cc, 65 PS (48 kW) PSA XUD engined GLD, GRD, followed by the SRD in 1987. Certain export markets also received a 60 PS (44 kW) 1769-cc version of this engine from the beginning. In France, the smaller diesel option only arrived in 1992. With 305 sales dropping considerably, the 309 range was expanded correspondingly in February 1987, when the three-door bodystyle was added. In line with Peugeot's naming policy of the time, five-door models generally have equipment levels beginning with the letter G, while three-doors begin with the letter X. Another important new model was the 1905 cc, high performance GTi version of the 309, using the same XU9 engine as found in the 205 GTi. Other new versions in 1987 were the new Automatic (only with five doors) and the XA and XAD two-seater vans which arrived in February.

The 309 was also significant in that it was the first Peugeot car to be assembled in the former Rootes factory in Ryton-on-Dunsmore, which Peugeot had inherited with its buyout of Chrysler Europe in 1978. Largely due to its partially British origins, the Peugeot 309 became a popular choice in the United Kingdom, and in 1987, it was joined on the production line by the larger 405. The 309's successor, the 306, was also built at Ryton, as was the 206, which was the last vehicle in production there when the plant closed in December 2006.

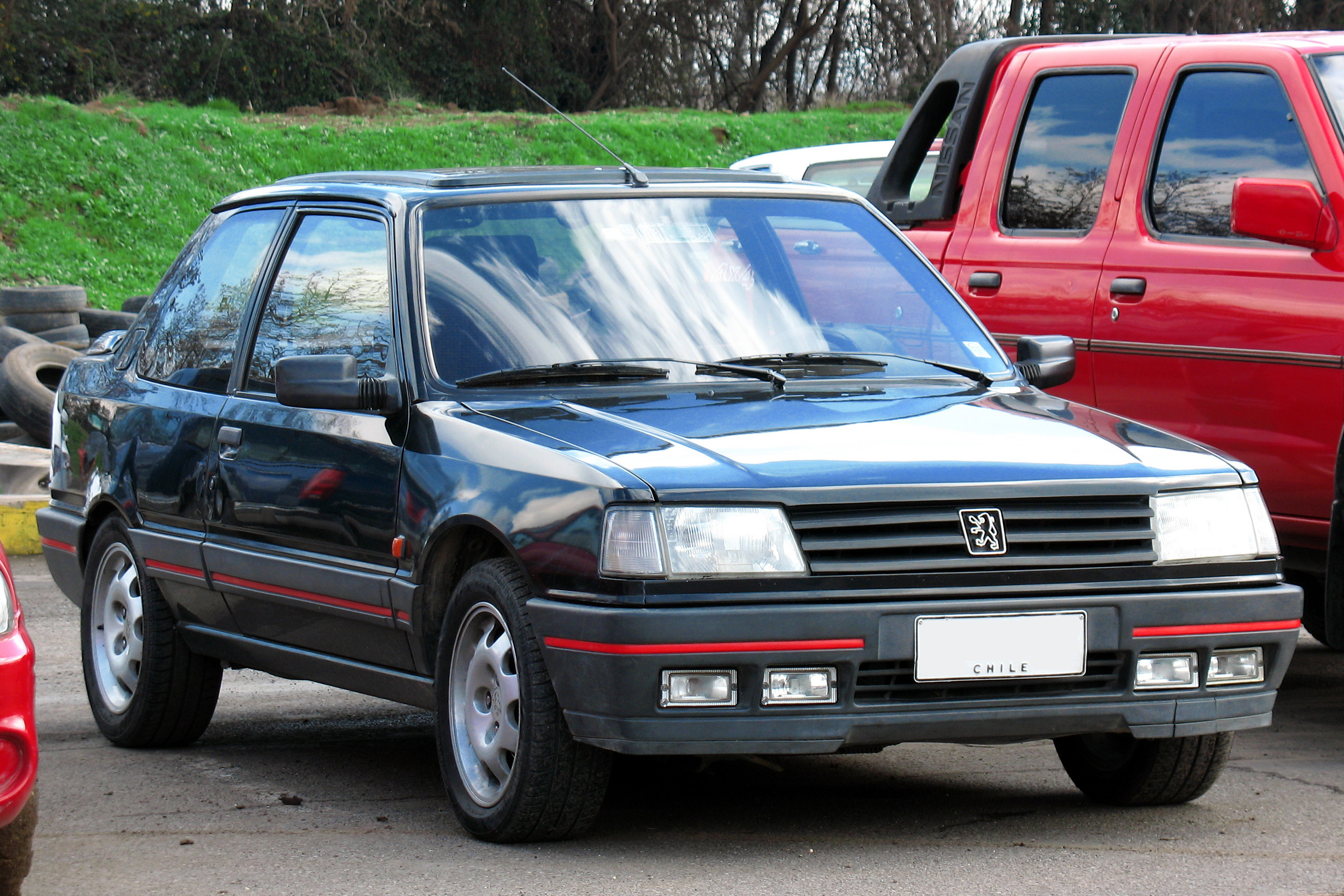
1988 Peugeot 309 GTi

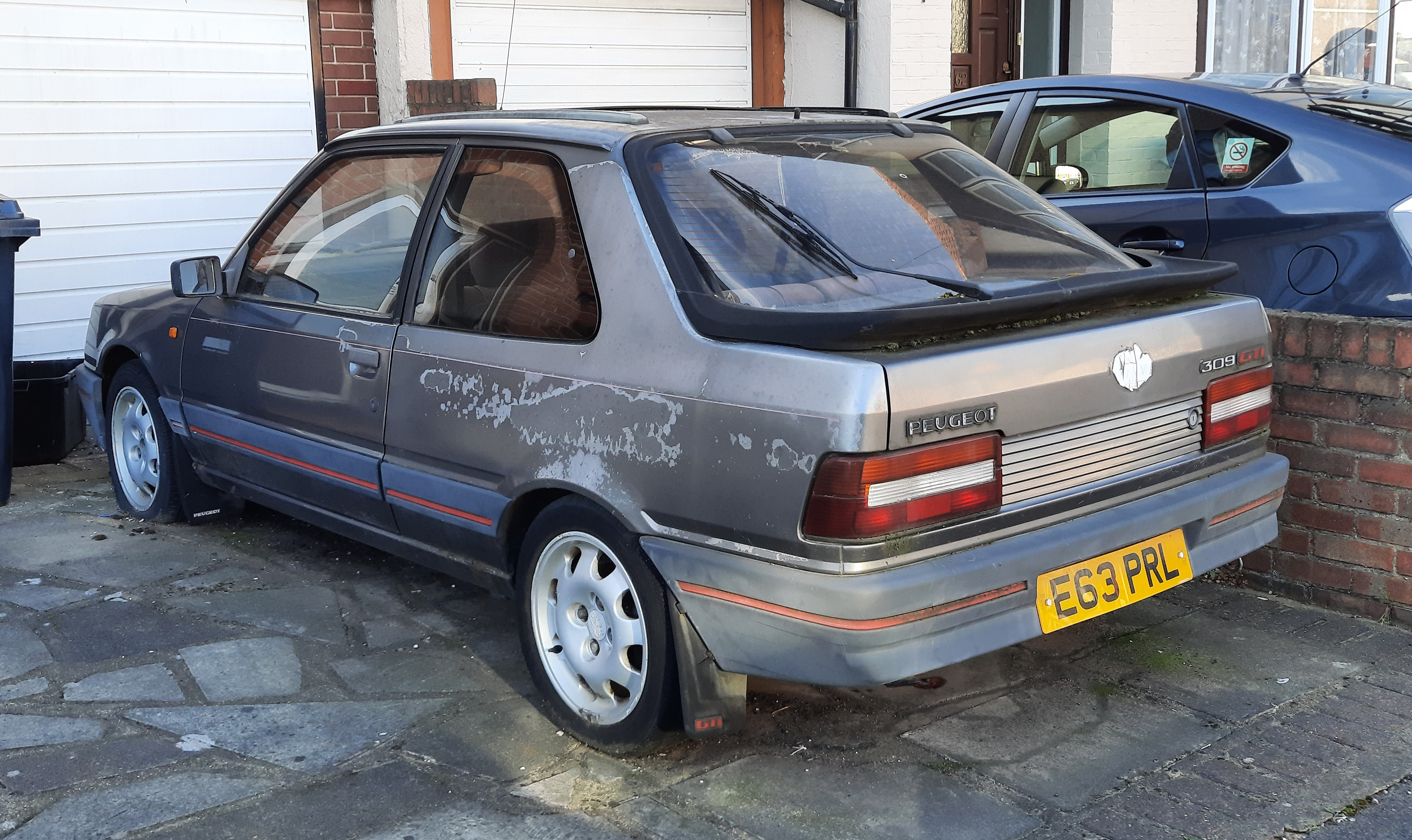
1988 Peugeot 309 GTi (rear)

== Facelift (Phase 2) ==
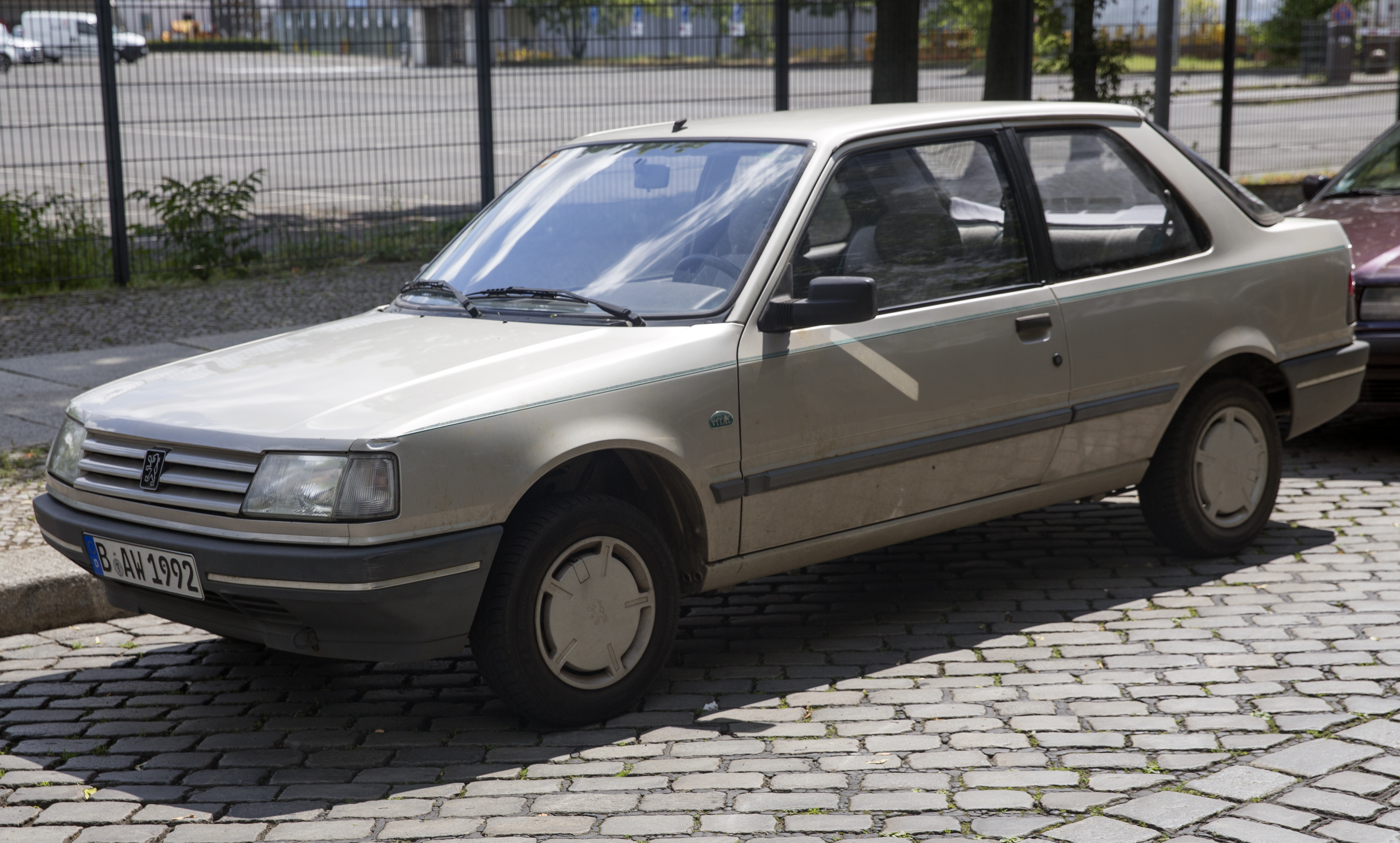
Facelifted 1992 309 Vital

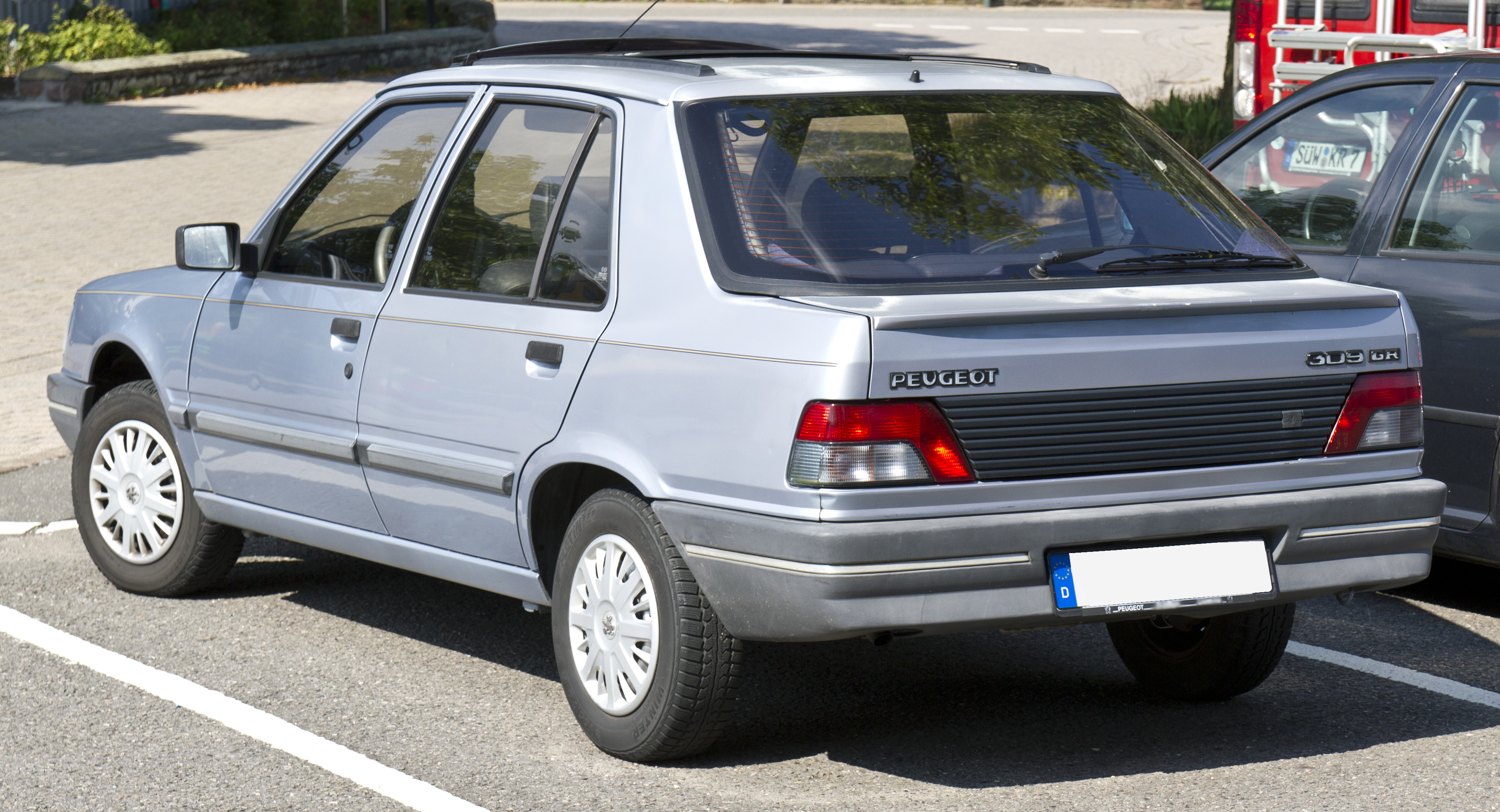
Facelifted 309 GR (rear)

The summer of 1989 saw the introduction of the Phase 2 Peugeot 309. It revised the design of the rear, considerably lowering the boot lip, changing the rear lights to a more 'smoked style' and making slight alterations to the front radiator grille.

Also, an updated interior was required to address severe criticisms leveled at the Phase 1's, Talbot-designed multi-piece dashboard which was prone to developing squeaks and rattles. The GTi models received a colour-coded, one-piece rear spoiler as opposed to the Phase 1's outdated rubber spoiler which, by then, harked back to early 1980s design practice.

Quite importantly a modified gearbox called 'BE3' was introduced, a revision of the original 'BE1' unit, placing reverse in the "down and to the right" position behind fifth gear, as opposed to the earlier "up and to the left" position next to first gear. Retrospectively, the 'BE3' gearboxes are slightly less prone to failure than their earlier counterparts.

This was also when Peugeot gradually phased in their, all new, belt driven TU Series overhead camshaft engines, in 1,124 cc and 1,360 cc forms, eventually replacing the trusty Simca units during 1992. The GTi 16 model, featuring the XU9J4 engine from the 405 Mi16, was also introduced at this time; however, these were only sold in mainland Europe. (See Trim levels)

=== End of production ===
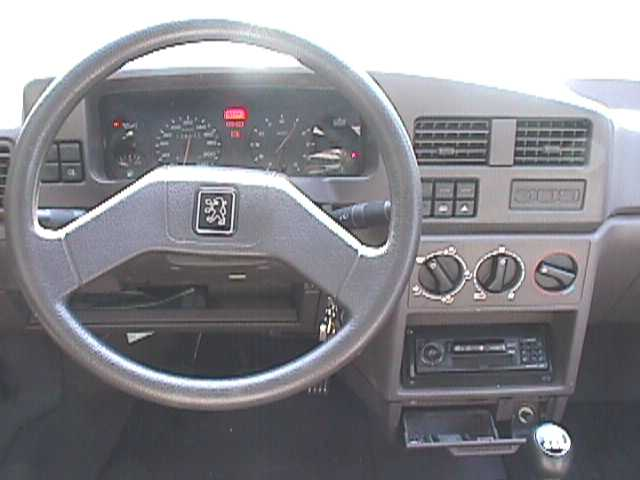
1991 Peugeot 309 1.4 GL Profil interior

Towards the end of 1992, production of the 309 began to wind down in anticipation of the launch of the new Peugeot 306, returning Peugeot to their normal numbering scheme. In July 1993, the 309 lineup was severely reduced and only the two Vital (petrol or diesel) models remained on sale until December. In total, 1,635,132 Peugeot 309s were built between 1985 and 1993. 18,262 of these were the GTi model, and 5,896 were GTi 16.

As of 2018, only 481 Peugeot 309s remained on the roads in the United Kingdom, with another 1,378 registered being kept off the road as SORN. As of September 2022, 41 Peugeot 309 GTis remained on the roads in the United Kingdom, with another 313 registered being kept off the road as SORN.

=== India ===
India's Premier Automobiles Limited (PAL) began local assembly of the long mothballed 309 in 1995, only with five-door bodywork. Originally available only as a petrol-engined GL model powered by the TU3 engine, waitlisted buyers for the GL received the option to choose a diesel engine (GLD) instead, beginning in 1997. Rather than the XUD engines used in Europe, however, Indian-built 309 diesels received the much smaller 1527-cc TUD5 engine with 57 hp (43 kW); an engine also used by Maruti Udyog. Labour and servicing issues were hindering the car in the marketplace, and after Premier formed a second joint venture with Fiat, Peugeot announced the end of their partnership with PAL in November 1997 with sales of the 309 continuing into 1998.

== Trim levels ==
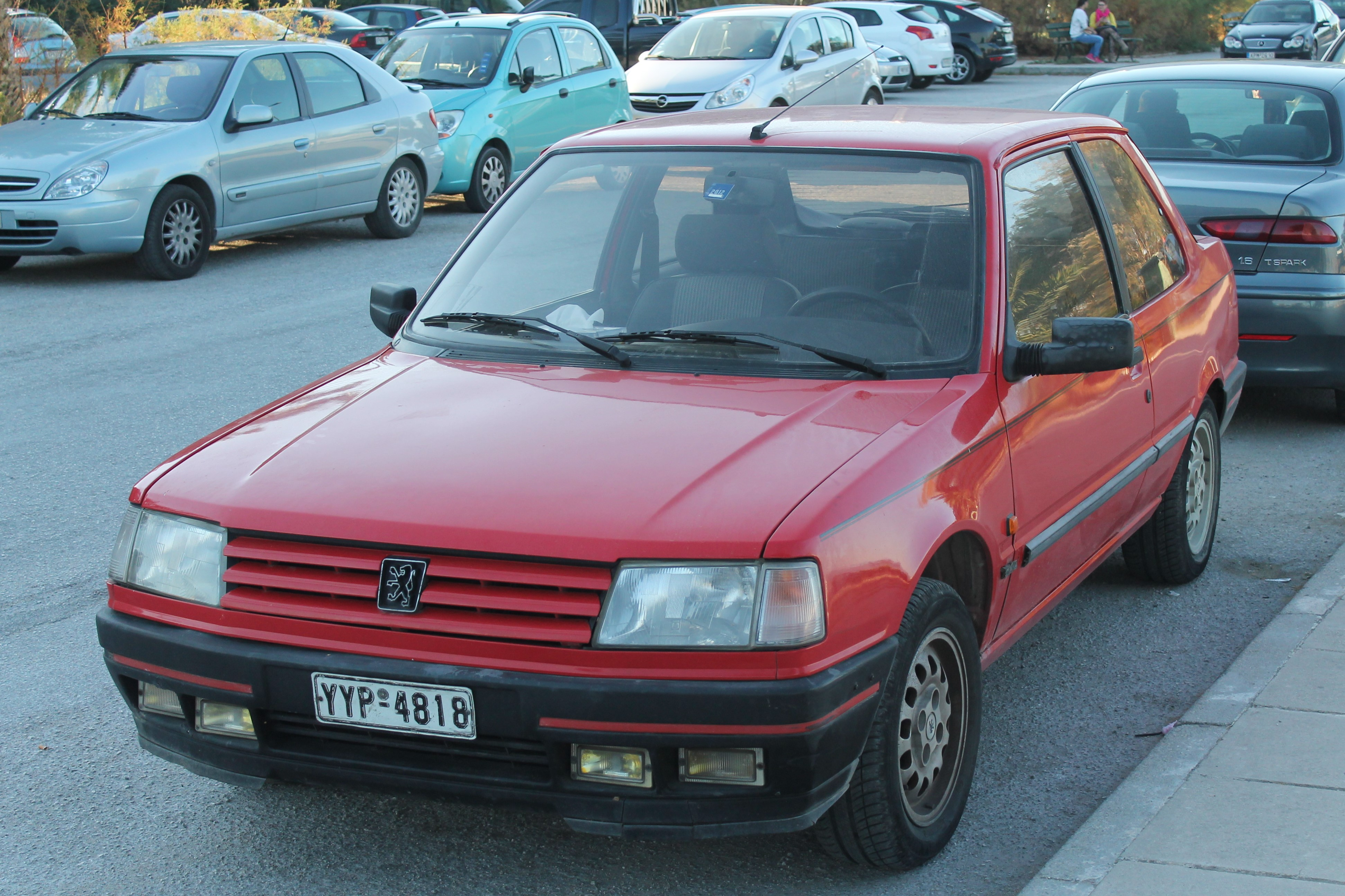
Peugeot 309 XR (front)

- XE, GE: 1118cc E1A or 1294cc G1A OHV Simca engine, X with three doors and G with five doors. The 1118 cc engine came with a four speed gearbox, whilst the 1294 cc came with a five speed gearbox. Standard equipment was sparse, featuring a rear bench seat, heated rear window, small wheel centre wheel covers, as well as a flick wipe facility. Options included a rear wash/wipe, side bump strips on the doors, and a pop up sunroof.

Many special editions were based on the X/GE, such as the Sport model, which came with a spoiler and side decals; and also the Sunseeker model, which came with a pop up sunroof, and side decals. In some markets a diesel E model was also available, using the 1905 cc XUD engine. All diesel models carry the D suffix on the model badge (XLD, GLD).

The Special Equipment model available in the United Kingdom in 1989 also added a pop up sunroof and a rear wash/wipe to the standard equipment list. The E designation was replaced by the Style designation, which began as a special edition in 1987, but became a part of the range from 1988, to denote the base model, in line with other contemporary Peugeot models of the time (e.g. the Peugeot 205 Style and the Peugeot 405 Style). The Style was also available with the 1124 cc and 1360 cc TU and 1905 cc XUD (Style D) engines, all with five speed gearboxes, after the Simca units were phased out.

- XL, GL: 1294 cc G1A, 1580 cc XU5, and 1905 cc XUD engines (with D suffix), all with five speed gearboxes, X with three doors and G with 5. The L model was available throughout the 309's production, varying differently from early to late cars. The early cars came with some standard features, such as better seat coverings than the E model, a clock on the dashboard, door bump strips, intermittent wipe, a glovebox door (as opposed to the X/GE's glovebox hole), 50/50 split/fold rear seats, full size wheel covers and a rear wash/wipe.

A three speed automatic option was available with the XU5 engined GL. Later in the production run, the XL model was dropped, and a 1769 cc XUD turbo diesel engine was added to the L range, to become GLDTurbo, which featured alloy wheels (from the Peugeot 205 1.6 GTI), uprated GTI specification suspension, and a pair of front fog lights. Options on this also included central locking, electric front windows and the Peugeot vacuum operated moonroof, essentially a large glass sliding sunroof.

- GLX: 1294 cc G1A, 1360 cc TU3, and 1580 cc XU5 engines, all with five speed gearboxes and all with five doors. Standard equipment includes a digital clock, a tachometer, a sliding glass moonroof, sports style seats (similar to those fitted to the 205 XS), rear wash/wipe, door bump strips, intermittent wipe, and a small boot spoiler. The 1.6 model also added central locking and front electric windows to the list.

Post facelift 1.3 models and the 1.4 model also have central locking. Curiously, if the GLX was ordered in white, and later burgundy red, the bumpers were body coloured, with a contrasting trim strip, red with the white bumpers and silver with the burgundy ones. After the facelift the bumpers also gained a pair of fog lights. A reflective strip panel was also on the options list, that replaced the louvred panel that sits between the rear lights.

- GR Profile: 1294cc G1A, five doors. Intended as competition for such cars as the Austin Maestro HLE, the GR Profile used exactly the same G1A engine as the lower models in the range, but combined it with subtle aerodynamic improvements and lower rolling resistance tyres to reduce the drag coefficient of the car, with the brochure claiming a fuel economy improvement of three miles per gallon at a constant 75 mph (121 km/h). The standard equipment list included an instrument lighting rheostat, a digital clock, an engine compartment undershield, a glovebox lamp, a carpeted boot and a boot light. Options included metallic paint, central locking, and electric windows. It was discontinued sometime in 1988, at about the time of the introduction of the GLX.
- XR, GR: 1580cc XU5, and 1905cc XUD engines, XR three door, GR five door. Much the same as the GR Profile in specification, with much the same standard features, and options. Was available later with the 115 PS (85 kW; 113 bhp) fuel injected XU5 engine, and also a detuned 90 PS (66 kW; 89 bhp) version, badged GRi, to address the problems Peugeot had with the XU engine and 95 octane fuels. Later in the run, a 1769 cc XUD turbo diesel model was also added, to become the GRDTurbo. This came with all the features as the GLDTurbo, and also added the features on the options list as standard. The XR was unavailable in the United Kingdom.

The 309 Automatic received equipment about on par with the GR, and was available with either the 1.6-liter XU5 or later with a lower-tuned, catalyzed 1.9-liter XU9J1 engine with 105 PS (77 kW; 104 bhp). Specifications varied somewhat depending on the market.

- SR, SRD, SR Injection: 1580 cc XU5, and 1905 cc XUD engines, all with five doors. The SR model was intended to top the range, along with the GR. The SR used the 80 PS (59 kW; 79 bhp) tune single carb XU5, the SRD used the 65 PS (48 kW; 64 bhp) XUD9, and the SR Injection used the 115 PS (85 kW; 113 bhp) XU5 from the 205 GTI 1.6. Equipment levels as standard were much the same as the GR, with the addition of central locking, internally adjustable headlights, a map reading light, electric windows in the front, Windsor velour seat trim and fibre-optic dashboard dials.

The SR Injection, in addition, added alloy wheels, remote controlled central locking, and remote controlled heated door mirrors. The options list included metallic/black paint, front fog lights, a sliding glass sunroof, an automatic gearbox (SR only), and SR decals on the rear flanks. These were only built in Phase 1 guise and many enthusiasts say that the SR was a better balanced car to drive than the GTI. However, not many SRs remain.

- XS and SX: 1580cc XU5, three door version was designated XS and the five door version SX. Marketed as a sporty model, to complement the GTI, with the 115 PS (85 kW; 113 bhp) XU5 injection engine. Was a little more basic than the SR models, to enhance the sporty feel, and made do without such things as luxury seats, instead having the tweed sports seats from the Peugeot 205 XS. In some markets, such as Sweden and Switzerland, the XS was fitted with the XU9M, a lower tuned version of the GTi's 1.9-liter engine producing 110 PS (81 kW; 108 bhp).

It also came with opening rear windows (three door), a digital clock, a black spoiler (painted spoiler from the GTI after the facelift), driving lamps and a load area lamp. Options included alloy wheels, central locking/electric windows (only available as a twinned options pack), a sliding glass sunroof and front fog lights. The SX model was not available in the United Kingdom.

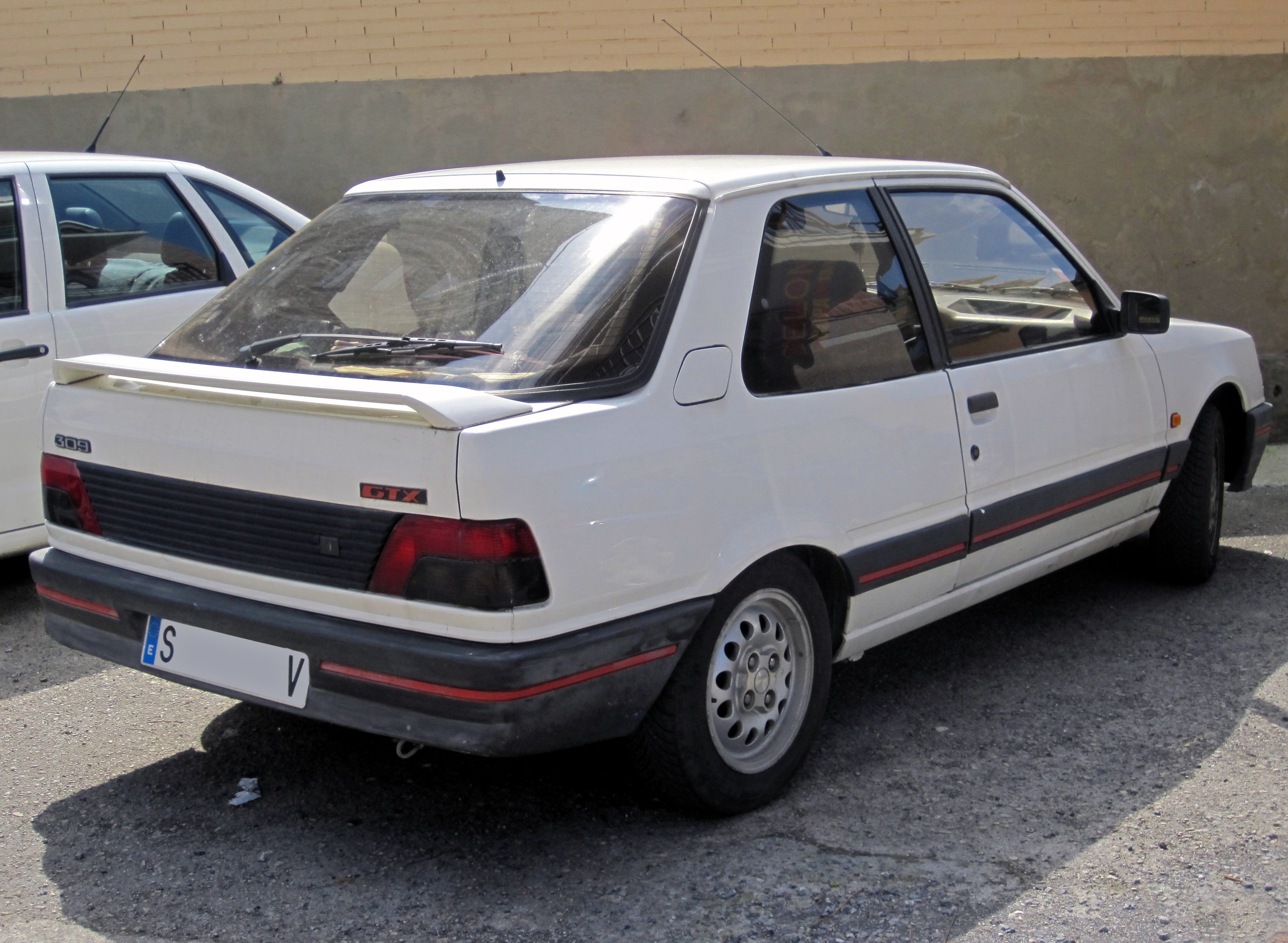
1989 Peugeot 309 GTX, a model specific to Spain

- GTI: 1905 cc XU9, three or five doors. Introduced in February 1987 in three-door form, the five-door variant arrived shortly thereafter. Arguably the top of the range, fitted with the 1905 cc XU9 engine, producing 130 PS (96 kW; 128 bhp). In some markets a catalyzed engine producing 122 PS (90 kW; 120 bhp) was sold instead, to conform with 95 octane unleaded and emissions regulations. The non-catalyzed model was discontinued for all markets in 1992.

The GTI came with some features unique to the range, such as the large black boot spoiler, driving lights and fog lights in the front bumper, remote opening rear windows (three-door only), and the Speedline 1.9 GTI alloys - the 309 being the first car to be fitted with them. Also benefitted from uprated suspension, tinted glass, a deep front airdam, a leather steering wheel and internally adjustable headlights. Items on the options list included central locking/electric windows (as part of a twinned options pack), a sliding glass sunroof, and metallic/black paint.

- GTI 16, A late, July 1989 addition to the range and only produced for a limited period. It featured the 160 PS (118 kW; 158 bhp), 16V 1.9-litre alloy XU9J4 engine from the 405 Mi16/Citroën BX 16V. It also included slightly uprated suspension (stiffer rear torsion bars, and wider track width both front and rear). The GTI 16 was produced in LHD only as right-hand drive would have required modifications to allow the master cylinder to clear the exhaust header. With UK sales of the eight-valve 309 GTI running at only around 1,000 per year (one tenth of 205 GTi sales), Peugeot UK chose not to import it. The very high power-to-weight ratio (160 PS / 975 kg) resulted in a highly responsive drive, even by modern standards. The catalyzed version produces 148 PS (109 kW; 146 bhp); the non-catalyzed version was no longer built for 1993.
- XA, XAD, three-door van models with minimal equipment and no rear seats. These were introduced in February 1987. The XA originally received the 1,118 or 1,294 cc Simca petrol engines with 55 or 65 hp (40 or 48 kW), while the XAD received the typical 1,905 cc engine with 65 hp (48 kW). After the 1989 "Phase 2" facelift, the petrol engines were replaced by the 60 hp (44 kW), 1,124 cc TU-series engine.

Some notable limited edition models included:

The Zest/Zest D and the Trio/Trio D editions, with 1124/1360 cc TU engines and 1905 cc XUD engines, with unique seat fabric, green seatbelts and side decals down both flanks.

The Look, available in blue, white, and very scarce black were fitted with unique seat fabric with a sunroof and coloured bumper inserts.

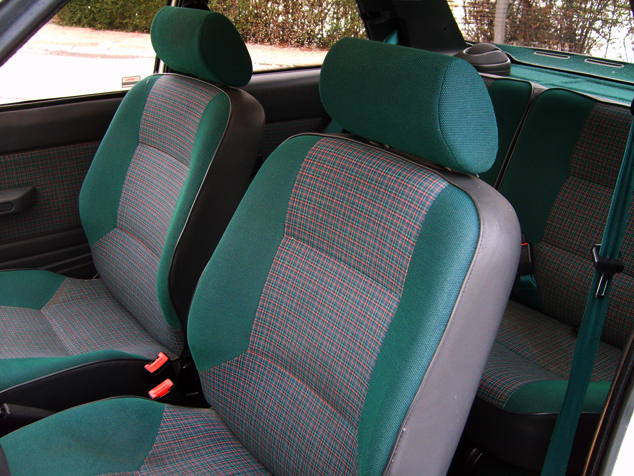
Peugeot 309 Green interior

The Green, produced between 1987 and 1991, available in 3/5 doors versions, with the unique "Blanc Meije" color, white wheel hubs, sunroof, unique decals and "Green" logo in the back, green seatbelts and interior fabric, tinted windows, rear windshield wiper, painted bumpers with a unique green stripe.

The Goodwood, Limited Edition for the United Kingdom was a GTI with full black leather interior as standard, and no cost optional wooden steering wheel, gearknob and CD Autochanger. The 309 Goodwood was only available in limited numbers for the United Kingdom (only 398 vehicles were constructed) in metallic pinewood green with anthracite Speedline alloy wheels, with a polished metal lip on the outer rim and badging depicting the Goodwood racing circuit on the front wings, tailgate and steering wheel boss. When the Goodwood was launched, the high asking price resulted in some examples not finding homes until 1994, hence some being registered on an 'L' prefix registration.

== Models ==
The models listed below are for the French domestic market.

Peugeot 309 (1985–1993)
Equipment		Engine	Displ. cc	Fuel feed	Power			Torque			Transmission	Brakes		Weight		Top speed		Acceleration; 0–100 km/h (s)	Production dates
3-doors	5-doors	Engine	Displ. cc	Fuel feed	PS	kW	at rpm	N⋅m	lb⋅ft	at rpm	Transmission	front	rear	kg	lb	km/h	mph	Acceleration; 0–100 km/h (s)	Production dates
Petrol-engined models
XE, XL	base, GE, GL	E1A	1118	Single-barrel carburettor	55	40	6000	80	59	3400	4MT	Discs	Drums	870	1920	150	93	17.3	1985–1989
XA Van	-	E1A	1118	Single-barrel carburettor	55	40	6000	80	59	3400	4MT	Discs	Drums	860	1900	150	93	17.3	1987–1989
XE	GE	TU1 F2/K	1124	Single-barrel carburettor	60	44	5800	87.5	65	3200	4MT	Discs	Drums	870	1920	150	93	17.3	1989–1992
XA Van	-	TU1 F2/K	1124	Single-barrel carburettor	60	44	5800	87.5	65	3200	4MT	Discs	Drums	860	1900	146	91	17.3	1989–1992
XL	GL	TU1 F2/K	1124	Single-barrel carburettor	60	44	5800	87.5	65	3200	5MT	Discs	Drums	870	1920	153	95	16.5	1989–1992
Vital	Vital	TU1 M/Z	1124	EFI	60	44	6200	87.5	65	3800	4MT	Discs	Drums	850	1870	152	94	15.4	1992–1993
XL, XR	GL, GR, SR	G1A	1294	Single-barrel carburettor	65	48	5600	103	76	2800	5MT	Discs	Drums	870	1920	159	99	15.4	1985–1989
XL Profil	GL Profil	G1A	1294	Single-barrel carburettor	65	48	5600	103	76	2800	5MT	Discs	Drums	870	1920	165	103	14.8	1985–1989
XA Van	-	G1A	1294	Single-barrel carburettor	65	48	5600	103	76	2800	5MT	Discs	Drums	860	1900	155	96	15.4	1987–1989
XL Profil	GL Profil, GR	TU3A/K	1360	Single-barrel carburettor	70	51	5700	111	82	3400	5MT	Discs	Drums	870	1920	165	103	13.2	1989–1992
GRX, Vital	GRX, Vital	TU3M/Z	1360	EFI	75	55	5500	111	82	3400	5MT	Discs	Drums	870	1920	165	103	11.1	1992–1993
XR	SR, GR	XU5C	1580	Single-barrel carburettor	80	59	5600	132	97	3800	5MT	Discs	Drums	890	1960	170	106	12.5	1985–1988
XR, XS	GR, SR, SX	XU5 2C	1580	Double-barrel carburettor	92	68	6250	129	95	3250	5MT	Discs	Drums	890	1960	180	112	10.7	1988–1992
-	GRX	XU5M/Z	1580	EFI	92	68	6250	132	97	3250	5MT	Discs	Drums	910	2010	180	112	10.5	1992–1993
-	Automatic	XU5C	1580	Single-barrel carburettor	80	59	5600	132	97	3800	3AT	Discs	Drums	925	2040	165	103	16.0	1987–1989
-	Automatic	XU5 2C	1580	Double-barrel carburettor	92	68	6250	129	95	3250	3AT	Discs	Drums	900	1980	170	106	14.1	1989–1992
-	GRX Automatic	XU5M/Z	1580	EFI	92	68	6250	132	97	3250	3AT	Discs	Drums	930	2050	170	106	14.1	1992–1993
-	GT	XU9 2C	1905	Double-barrel carburettor	105	77	5600	162	119	3000	5MT	Discs	Drums	930	2050	190	118	10.4	1985–1989
XS	SX	XU9 2C	1905	Double-barrel carburettor	105	77	5600	162	119	3000	5MT	Discs	Drums	930	2050	190	118	10.4	1989–1992
XS	SX	XU9 2C	1905	Double-barrel carburettor	110	81	6000	162	119	3000	5MT	Discs	Drums	930	2050	191	119	9.9	19929193
GTI	GTI	XU9JA	1905	EFI	130	96	6000	161	119	4750	5MT	Vented discs	Discs	930	2050	206	128	8.0	1987–1989
GTI	GTI	XU9JA	1905	EFI	130	96	6000	161	119	4750	5MT	Vented discs	Discs	950	2090	206	128	8.0	1989–1992
GTI	GTI	XU9JA/Z	1905	EFI	122	90	6000	153	113	3000	5MT	Vented discs	Discs	950	2090	202	126	8.7	1992–1993
GTI 16v	-	XU9J4	1905	EFI	160	118	6500	177	131	5000	5MT	Vented discs	Discs	975	2150	220	137	7.8	1989–1992
GTI 16v	-	XU9J4/Z	1905	EFI	148	109	6400	170	125	5000	5MT	Vented discs	Discs	975	2150	214	133	8.2	1992–1993
Diesel-engined models
Vital D	Vital D	XUD7/K	1769	Indirect injection	60	44	4600	110	81	2000	5MT	Discs	Drums	950	2090	155	96	15.9	1992–1993
XAD Van	-	XUD7/K	1769	Indirect injection	60	44	4600	110	81	2000	5MT	Discs	Drums	890	1960	155	96	15.9	1990–1993
-	SRDT, GRXD Turbo	XUD7T/K	1769	Turbo IDI	78	57	4300	157	116	2100	5MT	Discs	Drums	990	2180	175	109	13.0	1989–1993
XLD, XRD	GLD, GRD, SRD	XUD9A	1905	Indirect injection	65	48	4600	120	89	2000	5MT	Discs	Drums	950	2090	160	99	15.3	1986–1989
XAD Van	-	XUD9A	1905	Indirect injection	65	48	4600	120	89	2000	5MT	Discs	Drums	890	1960	156	97	15.3	1987–1990
XLD, XRD, Graffic, Vital	GLD, GRD, SRD, Graffic, Vital	XUD9A	1905	Indirect injection	65	48	4600	120	89	2000	5MT	Discs	Drums	950	2090	160	99	15.3	1989–1993
