= Ryton-on-Dunsmore =

Village in Warwickshire, England

Coordinates: 52.366°N 1.436°W

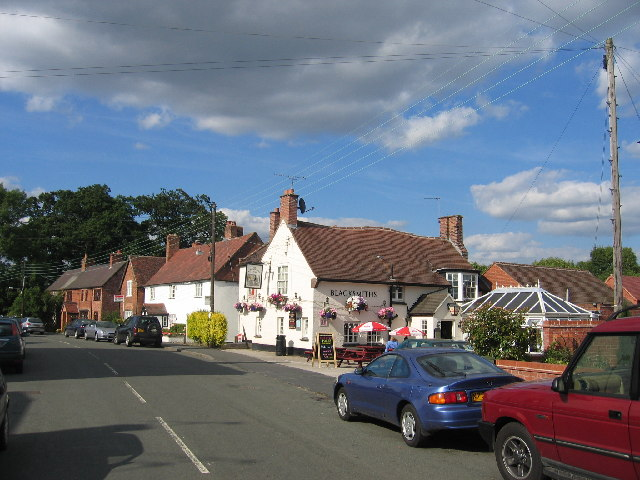

- Location within Warwickshire
- Population: 1,813 (2011)
- OS grid reference: SP3874
- Civil parish: Ryton-on-Dunsmore
- District: Rugby
- Shire county: Warwickshire
- Region: West Midlands
- Country: England
- Sovereign state: United Kingdom
- Post town: COVENTRY
- Postcode district: CV8
- Dialling code: 024
- Police: Warwickshire
- Fire: Warwickshire
- Ambulance: West Midlands
- UK Parliament: Rugby

Ryton-on-Dunsmore is a village and civil parish in the Borough of Rugby, Warwickshire, England. It is situated 5.5 miles (8.9 km) south-east of Coventry and 8 miles (13 km) west of Rugby. The 2001 census recorded a population of 1,672 in the parish, increasing to 1,813 at the 2011 census. The A45 dual carriageway bissects Ryton, and nearby villages include Bubbenhall, Stretton-on-Dunsmore and Wolston. Garden Organic, the leading organic growing charity in the United Kingdom, has a 10-acre (4-hectare) demonstration garden dedicated to organic gardening in the village. Ryton Pools Country Park is about a mile south-west of the village.

== Car plant ==
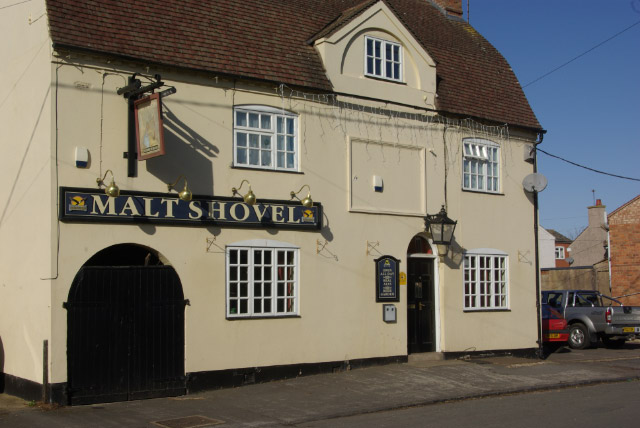
The Malt Shovel

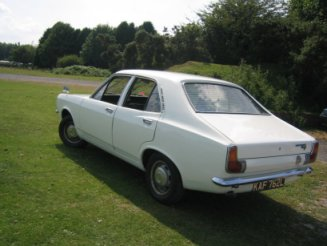
1972 Hillman Avenger saloon built at the Ryton plant

The former factory (also known as the Ryton plant) was a key feature of the village for more than sixty years. It was situated between the A45 (on the north-east) and the A423 (on the south-west) in Warwickshire. The south-east of the factory site bordered with Ryton-on-Dunsmore village. The factory was originally constructed by the Rootes Group in 1940 to build aircraft engines during World War II. After the war it became the headquarters of the Rootes Group, but when the organisation entered financial difficulties in the 1960s, the company (in stages) and thus the plant was taken over by the American car manufacturing giant Chrysler.

Chrysler itself entered financial difficulties, and sold the plant for a symbolic US$1.00 to PSA Peugeot Citroën in 1978, and from this stage, all cars produced at the plant were badged as Talbots, reviving an old brand name to replace the Chrysler brand in Britain, and the Simca name on the continent. Peugeot started building its 309 there on 28 October 1985, and by the end of 1987, it had been joined by the 405. This followed a decision by Peugeot in 1985, to phase out the Talbot brand, but to retain the old Rootes Group and Simca factories, for the production of Peugeot badged cars.

Peugeot 309 production was switched to France in 1989, with the plant briefly becoming a one model plant for production of the 405, but the 306 joined in the end of 1992, and for a while was the mainstay of production after the 405's demise in the autumn of 1995. The estate model was not axed until 1997, but had always been produced in France, and Peugeot had decided to produce the 405's successor (the 406) in France. The second production line was revived over the summer of 1998, with the commencement of production of the 206, and the 206 was the only car produced at the plant, after the end of production of the 306 in the spring of 2001. Peugeot had also decided to produce the new 307 in France rather than at Ryton.

In January 2004, Peugeot decided not to manufacture the 207 in Ryton, thus leaving the factory in danger of being shut down. In February 2004, the 1,000,000th 206 rolled off the production line. In April 2006, Peugeot decided that the Ryton plant would close during July 2007. In October 2006, however, Peugeot announced it will close its plant six months sooner than expected. In the event, it closed on 12 December 2006, and the 140-acre (57-hectare) site was sold to developer Trenport Investments Ltd for industrial use in March 2007. Demolition of the plant began on 12 November 2007. In October 2012, Network Rail acquired the site from Prologis, and constructed a haulage distribution centre. The centre opened the following year, and serves as a hub for the National Delivery Service for Network Rail.

== Sports ==
The academy of Coventry City F.C., the Sky Blues Lodge, is based on the Leamington Road in the village.

== Notable people ==
The cyborg scientist Kevin Warwick grew up in the village in the 1960s, and attended the local junior school.

== Notable organisations ==
The National Vehicle Crime Intelligence Service is based in the village. The College of Policing headquarters is located here.
