= Ryton plant =

Car manufacturing plant in the West Midlands

Ryton Plant
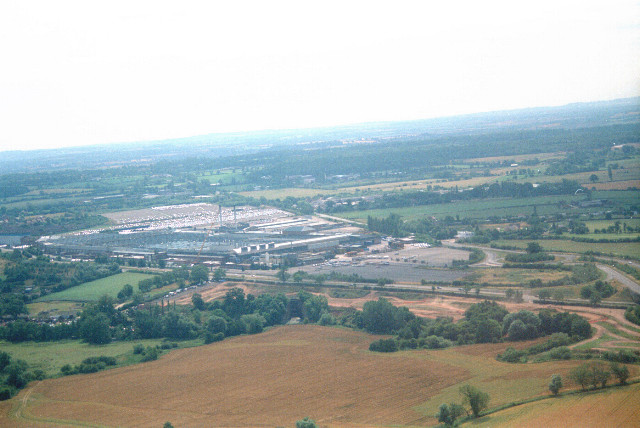
- Ryton Plant as seen in August 1994
- Operated: 1939–2006
- Location: Ryton-on-Dunsmore, UK
- Coordinates: 52.37°N 1.45°W
- Industry: Automotive
- Products: Aircraft engines, automobile
- Area: 140 acres (0.57 km^{2})
- Owners: Rootes Group (1939–67); Chrysler Europe (1967–78); PSA Group (1978–2006)
- Defunct: 2007; 19 years ago

The Ryton plant is a former car manufacturing plant in Ryton-on-Dunsmore, England. Developed by the Rootes Group as a shadow factory in 1939 to produce aircraft engines for World War II; post war it became the headquarters of the group.

Taken over by Chrysler Europe in 1967 and then by PSA Group in 1978, it shut in December 2006, and was subsequently redeveloped by Trenport Investments Ltd, for industrial use in March 2007. The plant met its final demise in November 2007, when it was completely demolished.

== History ==
=== Shadow factory ===
Under plans developed by the Air Ministry in 1936, the Shadow factory plan headed up by Herbert Austin, aimed to increase production capacity in the British aircraft industry. The plan required the construction and development of nine new factories, and investment in the expansion or the capability of the United Kingdom's existing motor vehicle manufacturing plants, to enable them to more quickly turn to aircraft production.

Situated between the A45 (on the North East) and the A423 (on the South West) in Warwickshire, the factory became operational from 1940.

=== Post war ===
After the war the site became the headquarters of the Rootes Group, but when the organisation entered financial difficulties in the 1960s, the company (in stages), and thus the plant, were taken over by American car manufacturing giant Chrysler, along with the French manufacturer Simca.

The Rootes models were gradually phased out during the 1970s; with the production of the Hillman Hunter and Avenger models being moved to the Linwood plant in Scotland from 1976, when Ryton began manufacturing the Simca-based Chrysler Alpine in 1976, followed by the Horizon from 1981; both of these models had initially been produced in France only.

Ryton from that point onward, effectively became a shadow plant to the Simca factory at Poissy in France, which broadly produced exactly the same models.

Chrysler itself entered financial difficulties, and in 1978 sold the plant, along with the rest of its European operations for a symbolic US$1.00 to PSA Peugeot Citroën. Peugeot adopted the dormant Talbot brand for the former Chrysler and Simca models, but falling sales saw it decide to axe the Talbot brand on passenger cars in the mid 1980s. In spite of this decision, the future of the Ryton plant was secured by Peugeot deciding to produce its own models there. The Linwood plant, built less than 20 years earlier by the Rootes Group, had closed in 1981.

Peugeot started building their 309 there in October 1985 (also building left hand drive models at the former Simca plant in Poissy, France), and, by the end of 1987, it was joined by the 405. Both the 309 and 405 had helped boost Peugeot's market share within the United Kingdom during the second half of the 1980s, building on the sales success which began with the launch of the French built 205 from 1983.

309 production was concentrated wholly at Poissy from 1989, although Ryton began producing its 306 successor at Ryton from the end of 1992. The 306 proved even more popular than its predecessor. The 405 was phased out between 1995 and 1997, and its 406 successor was produced in France, leaving the 306 as the only production model at Ryton for a while.

The second production line was revived in the summer of 1998, with the commencement of production of the 206, and the 206 was the only car produced at the plant, after the end of production of the 306 in 2001. The 206 was most successful Peugeot model to be produced at Ryton. In January 2004, Peugeot decided not to manufacture the future 207 model at Ryton, thus leaving the factory in danger of being shut down, although two years of uncertainty followed this announcement, as the possibility remained that Peugeot could retain the plant to produce other models.

In February 2004, the 1,000,000th 206 rolled off the production line, less than six years after the first.

=== Closure ===
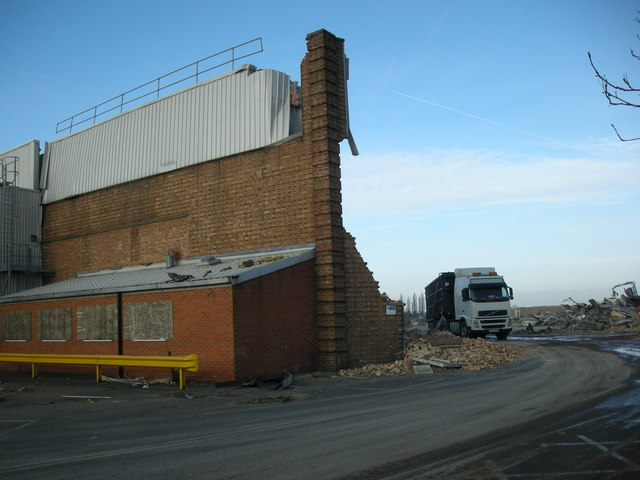
Demolition of the plant, March 2008

In April 2006, Peugeot decided that the Ryton plant would close during July 2007. In October 2006, however, Peugeot announced it would close its plant six months sooner than expected. In the event, it closed on 12 December 2006, and the 140-acre (0.57 km^{2}) site was sold to developer Trenport Investments Ltd for industrial use in March 2007. The plant was demolished in November 2007.

In October 2012, Network Rail acquired the site from Prologis, and constructed a haulage distribution centre. The centre opened the following year, and serves as a hub for the National Delivery Service for Network Rail. Jaguar Land Rover (JLR) now have three manufacturing units on this site: Prototype Build, Classics and Special Vehicle Operations. The JLR site is known as Oxford Road or by the internal codename DC7, and not "Ryton" in order to avoid possible confusion with any previous automotive manufacturers at this location.
