= Chrysler Europe =

Subsidiary of Chrysler

- Company type: Subsidiary
- Industry: Automotive
- Predecessor: Barreiros; Dodge Brothers (Britain) Ltd. Rootes Group; Simca
- Founded: 1967
- Founder: Chrysler
- Defunct: 1978; 48 years ago
- Fate: Sold to PSA Peugeot Citroën after Chrysler ceased its operations outside of North America
- Successor: PSA Peugeot Citroën (cars); Renault Trucks (commercial)
- Headquarters: Whitley, England; Poissy, France; Madrid, Spain
- Products: Automobiles
- Brands: Barreiros; Chrysler; Commer; Dodge; Hillman; Humber; Karrier; Matra; Simca; Singer; Sunbeam; Talbot
- Parent: Chrysler
- Subsidiaries: Chrysler España, S.A. Chrysler France; Chrysler (UK); Matra Automobiles

Chrysler Europe was the American automotive company Chrysler's operations in Europe from 1967 through 1978. It was formed from the merger of the French Simca, British Rootes and Spanish Barreiros companies. In 1978, Chrysler sold the division to PSA Peugeot Citroën.

PSA rebadged the former Chrysler and Simca models with the revived Talbot marque, but abandoned the brand for passenger cars in 1987, although it continued on commercial vehicles until 1994.

Among the remaining Chrysler Europe assets still in existence are the former Simca factory in Poissy and the former Barreiros plant in the Madrid suburb Villaverde, which are now Stellantis assembly plants, and the Rootes Group research and development complex in Whitley, Coventry, which is now the headquarters of Jaguar Land Rover.

== History ==
=== Formation ===
Chrysler Corporation had never had much success outside North America, contrasting with Ford's worldwide reach and General Motors' success with its Opel, Vauxhall, Bedford and Holden brands. Chrysler first established an interest in the French-based Simca in 1958, buying 15% of the company's stock from Ford. In 1963, Chrysler increased their stake to a controlling 63% by purchasing further stock from Fiat.

Chrysler acquired a 35% share of the Spanish Barreiros in 1963, and it became part of Chrysler Europe in 1969. Barreiros was renamed Chrysler España, S.A. in 1970. Also in 1963, Chrysler acquired the Greek company FARCO (founded in 1961 by the Kontogouris brothers to produce the Farmobil), which it renamed Chrysler Hellas S.A. after the acquisition. However, production there ended in 1967 without much success.

After failing to acquire an interest in the British-based Leyland Motors in 1962, Chrysler bought a 30% share in Rootes Group in 1964. Rootes was formally taken over by Chrysler following purchase of the remaining shares in 1967.

In 1970, Rootes was formally named "Chrysler (UK) Ltd." and Simca became "Chrysler (France)", with the Hillman marque finally being replaced by Chrysler on the UK market in 1976 and Simca surviving until after the PSA takeover in 1979.

=== Branding ===
Although the original marques were retained at first, from 1976 British-built cars were badged as 'Chryslers', while the Simca badge appeared on French versions, though with the Chrysler pentastar, in some markets the cars were sold as Chrysler-Simca. Chrysler used the Dodge marque on commercial vehicles produced by both Simca and Rootes (Commer and Karrier, but in addition using rebadging to sell vehicles overseas under the Fargo and DeSoto brands). In addition, in some countries, such as Spain, the Dodge and Simca marques would be used for other vehicles, mostly Spanish-designed (ex-Barreiros) trucks and buses and locally-built versions of US-market vehicles or local versions of Simca cars.

The company systematically retired the previous marques from Rootes, including Hillman, Humber, Singer and Sunbeam in favour of the Chrysler name. The Simca brand was retained in its native France, but the Simca vehicles themselves were usually branded as either Chrysler-Simca or simply Chrysler outside France. In 1969, Chrysler Europe closed a deal with French engineering group Matra Automobiles to jointly develop Matra sports cars and subsequently sell them through the Simca dealer network (as Matra-Simca). Following the introduction of the 1970 Avenger, Chrysler showed little investment or interest in the technologically conservative Rootes line-up, concentrating instead on the advanced front wheel drive Simca models instead.

=== Decline and sale to Peugeot ===
Confused branding resulted from trying to concurrently sell the mismatched pairing of the Simca and Rootes product families, contrasting heavily with the fortunes of arch rivals Ford and General Motors – who had both successfully managed to weave together their previously independent British and German subsidiaries. Chrysler Europe profits failed to materialize, although Simca on its own had been consistently profitable during its tenure under Chrysler ownership. It was the ailing former Rootes Group operations which were to prove to be the ultimate downfall of the company. Chrysler was already in serious financial trouble back home in America, and were on the brink of bankruptcy. The company's incoming CEO, Lee Iacocca, had shown little interest in the European market from the outset (just as he had done during his period in charge of Ford), and wasted no time in wielding the axe almost immediately.

In 1978, Chrysler Europe was sold for a nominal US$1 (equivalent to $4.94 in 2025) to PSA Peugeot Citroën, who took on the liability for its huge debts as well as its factories and product line, with the former Chrysler models in Britain and Simca models in France both using the revived Talbot marque from August 1979.

The Linwood factory in Scotland was closed by Peugeot in 1981 after just 18 years in use, marking the end of Avenger and Sunbeam production. The Sunbeam was replaced by the Peugeot 104 derived, French-built Talbot Samba, but the demise of the Avenger left the Horizon as the only car of its size in the Talbot range. The Alpine spawned a saloon version, the Solara, in 1980, filling the gap left in the range by the demise of the Hunter, and recognising that there was still a high demand for traditional family saloons.

But by 1987, the French giant had scrapped the Talbot marque on passenger cars due to falling sales – though retaining it for commercial vehicles until 1992. The car designed to succeed the Horizon became the Peugeot 309 on its launch at the end of 1985, and in 1983, Peugeot sold the shares in Matra Automobiles it had inherited when it acquired Chrysler Europe back to Matra and a Chrysler-initiated design of an MPV to Renault, where the design lived on as the Renault Espace. Production of the Samba and Alpine/Solara finished in May 1986, while the Horizon remained in production in Spain and Finland until 1987; French and British production had finished during 1985 when the Peugeot 309 went into production. American versions of this car were produced until 1990.

Peugeot took little interest in heavy commercial vehicles and the production of former British and Spanish Dodge models passed to Renault Trucks. The Rootes factory in Dunstable, England ceased manufacture of trucks, ending with the Renault Midliner in the mid-1990s. In 2009, the staff of Renault Trucks, part of the Volvo Group since 2001, relocated from the former Rootes site to a new building. The former factory has since been demolished.

Chrysler, on the other hand, retained the design rights to the Avenger and those of the US-version Horizon. Peugeot was therefore compelled to retain the Chrysler "Pentastar" badge on the Avenger, whilst allowing Chrysler to sell the design along with its entire operations in Argentina to Volkswagen which continued production until 1991 under the Volkswagen 1500 name. For the New Zealand market, the Avenger kept the Chrysler branding for 1980 after being rebranded elsewhere. Meanwhile, European sales of the Avenger ended in 1981. The American version of the Horizon continued to be produced in the United States as the Plymouth Horizon and Dodge Omni until 1990, three years after the last European model was made.

The former Simca and Rootes assembly plants in Poissy and Ryton-on-Dunsmore, respectively, continued under the ownership of Peugeot, but Rootes' Linwood plant in Scotland was a casualty of the takeover – closing its doors in 1981. The former Rootes Ryton plant was closed in December 2006, with the production of the Peugeot 206 (made there since the summer of 1998) moved to Slovakia. Since 1985, it had also produced Peugeot's 309, 405 and 306 ranges. It has since been demolished to make way for new factories. The former Rootes research and development site in Whitley was sold to Jaguar in 1986, and continues as the headquarters of Jaguar Land Rover to the present day. The former Simca site in Poissy has also thrived, and is now one Peugeot's most important assembly plants.

Decades after the sale, in 2021 Peugeot and Chrysler (the latter of which became part of Fiat in 2009 after another financial crisis led to its bankruptcy) fell under the same corporate umbrella when the now-Groupe PSA merged with Fiat Chrysler Automobiles to form Stellantis, which has once again seen Peugeot branded vehicles produced in the United Kingdom (this time in a Vauxhall plant - thanks to PSA's earlier purchase of General Motors Europe), and European designs marketed through Chrysler's distribution channels in the United States.

== Models ==
=== Cars ===
CKD assembly of various American Dodge, Plymouth and Chrysler models took place at Chrysler's own Rotterdam factory until its closure in 1970, and Barreiros (later part of Chrysler Europe) assembled the Dodge Dart in Villaverde (Madrid) from 1965 to 1970, followed under Chrysler ownership by the revised Dodge 3700 (1970–77). In Switzerland AMAG had also assembled various American Chrysler and Dodge models between 1948 and 1972, the most popular model being the Chrysler Valiant. None of these models sold in large quantities because even 'compact' American cars of that period were too large and fuel-thirsty to sell well in the European market.

Inherited Rootes and Simca car models still in production beyond 1967 were:

- Hillman Imp (1963–76) and its various badge-engineered derivatives: the Hillman Husky, Singer Chamois/Imp/Sport, Sunbeam Imp/Stiletto and Commer Imp van
- Hillman Hunter (1966–76) and its derivatives: the Hillman Minx, Humber Sceptre, Singer Gazelle/Vogue and Sunbeam Vogue. Later rebadged as the Chrysler Hunter (1976–79).
- Sunbeam Rapier/Alpine coupé (1967–76)
- Sunbeam Alpine roadster (1959–68)
- Simca 1000 (1961–78)
- Simca 1000 Coupé/1200S (1962–71)
- Simca 1100/1200/1204 (1962–82, vans to 1985). Van and pick-up versions were rebadged as Dodges for the British market 1976–79, and all models were badged as Talbots for Britain after 1979.
- Simca 1301/1501 (1963–75)

The first new European Chrysler was the large Chrysler 180 range (1970–82), including the 160 and 2 Litre. The 180 was the result of combining two projects that were previously being developed independently by Rootes and Simca as successors to their largest models (the Humber Hawk/Super Snipe and Simca Vedette, which had been discontinued in 1967 and 1961 respectively). This was the flagship model in the Chrysler Europe range, and it was the first European designed model to use the Chrysler name, which it was intended to establish as a premium marque above Simca and Humber. The 180 was intended to rival the likes of Audi 100 and Ford Granada during the 1970s, although unlike its competitors it was only available with 4-cylinder engines and lacked a prestige image. It was initially built in France, but due to disappointing sales its assembly was transferred to Spain as a successor to the Dodge 3700 in a market where protectionist trade policies guaranteed it some domestic sales. From 1977, the 180 was sold as a 'Chrysler-Simca' in most European markets (except Britain), and after the sale of Chrysler Europe to PSA it was rebadged again as a Talbot.

Also launched in 1970 was the Hillman Avenger (1970-81), a medium-sized family car which fitted between the Imp and the Hunter in Chrysler's British range. The model sold well in Britain but was less successful in export markets, where it was sold under a variety of names including Sunbeam/Sunbeam Avenger/Chrysler Sunbeam (Europe) and Plymouth Cricket (North America). The Avenger was originally assembled at the Ryton plant (displacing the Hunter to Linwood), but a mid-life facelift in 1976 coincided with Avenger assembly moving to Linwood as the Chrysler Avenger. from 1979 it was renamed the Talbot Avenger following the sale of Chrysler Europe to PSA.

The British car designer Roy Axe, who originally started his career with Rootes, was responsible for unifying the designs of the new European range starting with the Simca 1307 (1975–86) family hatchback, which was sold in the UK as the Chrysler Alpine. The new pan-European model was assembled in France, Spain and Britain, and was voted European Car of the Year for 1976. Other influential designers who worked for the company in the 1970s and had a significant impact in car design in the 1980s were Geoff Matthews, Peter Horbury and Fergus Pollock. From this '70s period, two outstanding projects were the Matra P18 prototype, which would later be developed into the MK1 Renault Espace and the Matra Rancho, which influenced the styling of the 1989 Land Rover Discovery.

The 1307/Alpine was a five-door hatchback with front-wheel drive, in a market sector which was still almost exclusively populated by rear-wheel drive saloons like the Ford Cortina/Taunus and Opel Ascona/Vauxhall Cavalier. Therefore, although the new 1307 replaced the conventional Simca 1301 model, in the UK Chrysler decided to keep the Hillman Hunter (a rear-wheel drive range of saloons and estates) in limited production as a traditional alternative to the Alpine. Introduction of the Alpine in 1976 required a complicated reorganisation of Chrysler's British assembly operations, with the Alpine replacing the Avenger at Ryton, Avenger assembly moving to Linwood replacing the Imp, Hunter, Sceptre and Rapier, and the residual Hunter assembly moving to a CKD operation in Ireland. The Avenger and Hunter were both facelifted at this time and re-badged as Chryslers. Production of the Chrysler Hunter finished in 1979 just after Peugeot took over, although the tooling was subsequently sold to Iran as the Paykan, which was built until 2005.

To replace the small Hillman Imp at the under-utilised Linwood plant, the British Government provided grants for the development of the Chrysler Sunbeam (1977–81), a three-door supermini hatchback based on a shortened Avenger floorplan. In contrast to the advanced Alpine the Sunbeam was rear-wheel drive and therefore somewhat dated compared to contemporary superminis such as the Ford Fiesta and Volkswagen Polo, and it was rarely seen outside the UK. It was renamed the Talbot Sunbeam in 1979.

The Matra Rancho (1977–84) was a leisure activity vehicle version of the Simca 1100 developed by the French automotive engineering firm Matra Automobiles in partnership with Chrysler Europe. Although a low-volume niche model based on an ageing car, it proved to be a sales success and can be viewed as a very early example of what would now be classified as a crossover vehicle.

The last new model launched before the demise of Chrysler Europe was the Chrysler Horizon (1978–87), which was also sold as the Chrysler-Simca Horizon and soon renamed the Talbot Horizon in 1979. Like the larger Alpine, the Horizon was another pan-European model built simultaneously in France, Spain and the UK (Ryton, from 1980), and it also won the European Car of the Year Award for 1979. The Horizon was a five-door front-wheel drive hatchback similar in concept to the Volkswagen Golf. Chrysler continued to make its own versions of the Horizon in its American factories after withdrawing from Europe, and production continued there until 1990.

Although the preceding Simca 1100 was front-wheel drive, at the time the Horizon was launched many comparable cars were still sold as rear-wheel drive saloons, so the Chrysler/Talbot Avenger was kept in production alongside to cater for more traditional buyers.

Prior to the sale of Chrysler Europe to Peugeot in 1978, Chrysler had begun development of a large flagship saloon as a replacement for the slow-selling 180/2 Litre range, to compete with cars like the Ford Granada and raise the image of the Chrysler brand. This car would eventually be launched in 1980 as the Talbot Tagora under Peugeot's ownership. However this model was not a strong seller either, and finished production after just three years and less than 20,000 sales.

Peugeot added a saloon version of the Alpine - the Talbot Solara (1980–86) - to the former Chrysler range, and also made use of its own Peugeot 104 underpinnings to develop the Talbot Samba (1981–86) supermini as the Sunbeam's replacement. However, thereafter there would be no new Talbot models. The rear-drive Talbot Sunbeam and Avenger and were axed when the Linwood plant closed in 1981. Peugeot continued production of the Talbot Samba, Alpine and Solara until 1986, and the Horizon until 1987, but then phased out the Talbot brand in favour of expanding its own brand by producing new Peugeot models in the former Rootes factory near Coventry and the former Simca plant at Poissy.

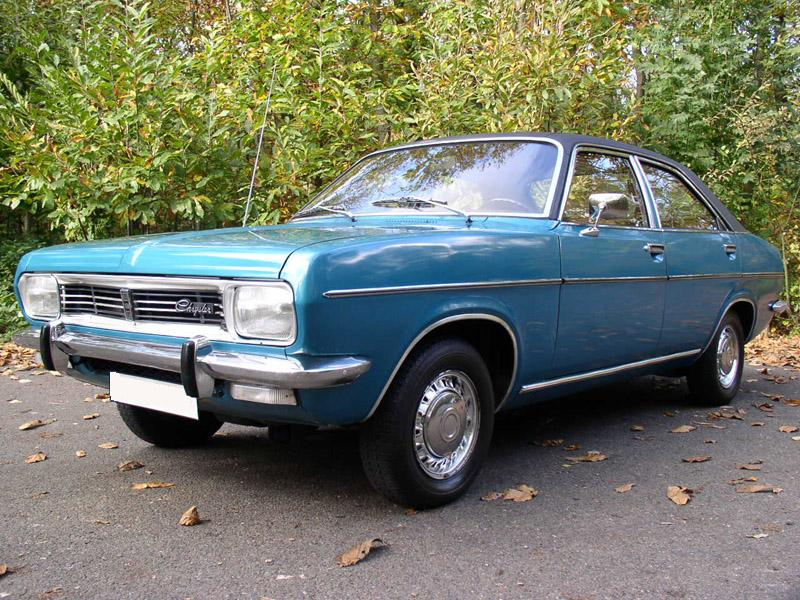
Chrysler 180 (1970)

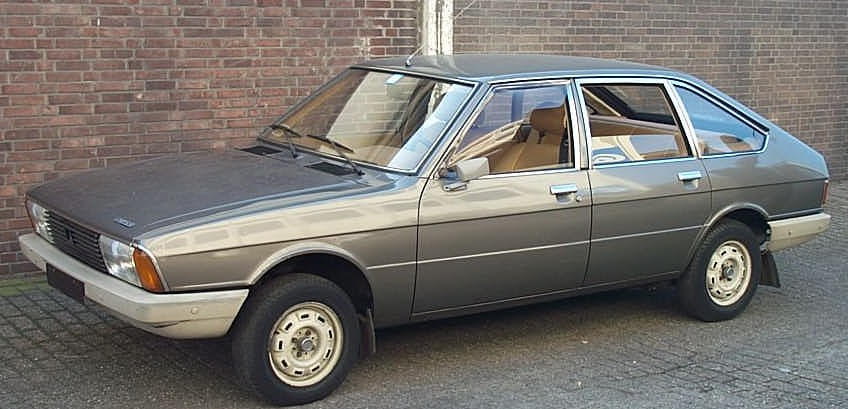
Chrysler Alpine (1975)

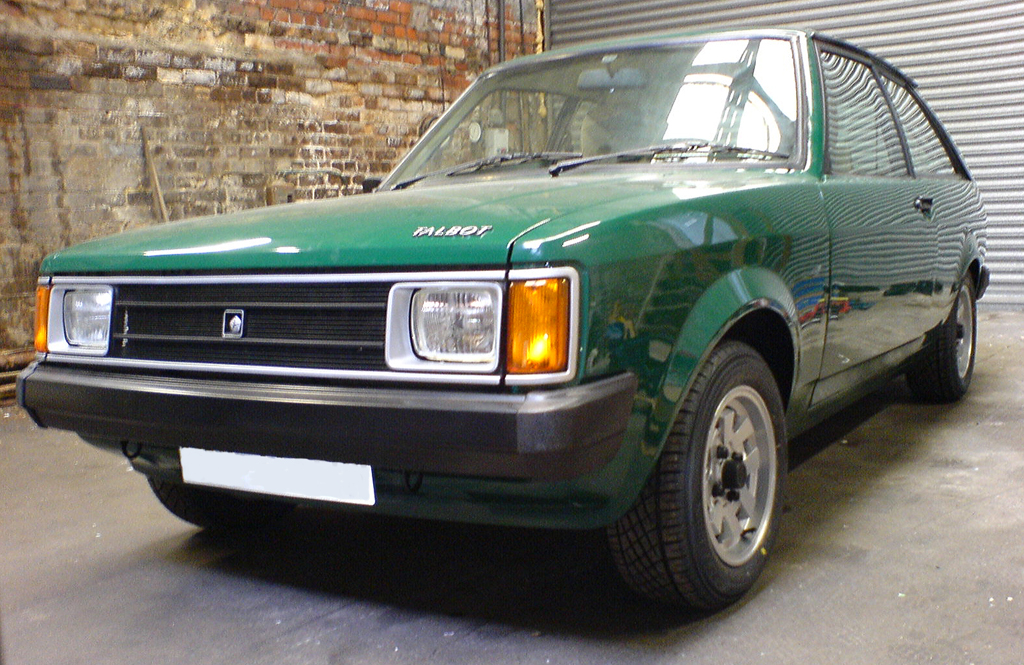
Chrysler Sunbeam (1977)

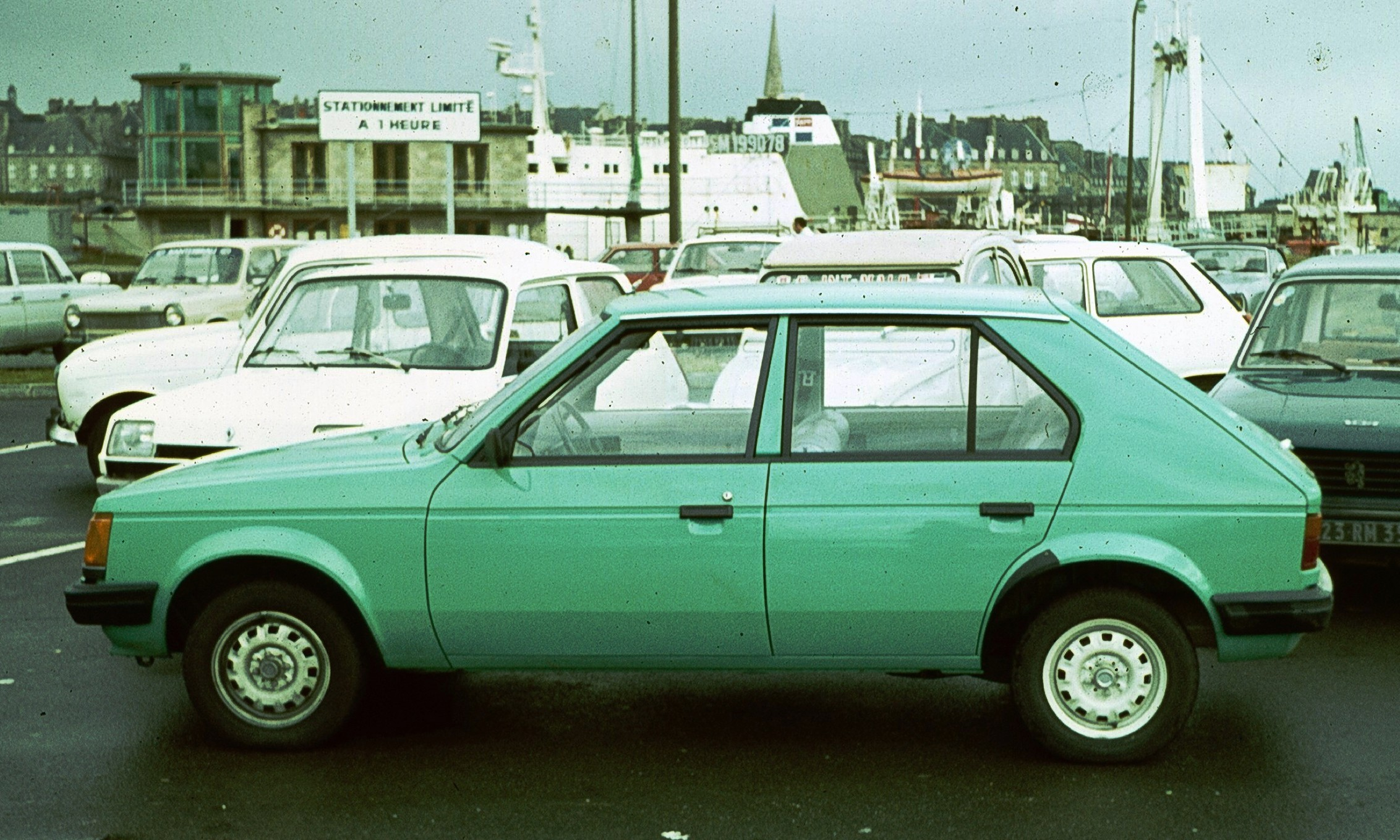
Chrysler Horizon (1978)

=== Vans and Trucks ===
Chrysler had developed its own line of British-built trucks which were assembled at its Kew (London) factory until 1967, when the former Chrysler and Rootes commercial vehicle ranges were merged, with production consolidated at the former Rootes plant at Dunstable. Chrysler also inherited a separate truck range from Barreiros in Spain.

The naming of Chrysler Europe's commercial vehicles was particularly complicated due to the proliferation of badge-engineering. Chrysler's own range of British trucks were sold as Dodges (or Dodge Kew, to differentiate from American models) in Britain, but in some export markets they were badged DeSoto or Fargo. Rootes principal commercial vehicle brand was Commer, but the Karrier name was also used, especially for lighter trucks and for vehicles sold to municipal customers. After Chrysler acquired Rootes, some former Commer models became available as Dodges and Fargos, while the Dodge 500 also became available as a Commer. Outside France, the van and pick-up derivatives of the Simca 1100 were also marketed under the Dodge brand. From 1976 all of the commercial vehicles were marketed as Dodges, apart from a few municipal vehicles which were still branded as Karriers. After sale of the commercial vehicle operations to Renault the Dodge name continued to be used until 1987, when the remaining Dodge models were re-branded as Renaults.

Excluding badge-engineered derivatives, Chrysler Europe's British-built commercial vehicle range comprised:

- Commer 1500/Dodge SpaceVan (1960–83), van/minibus/pickup/chassis-cab
- Commer/Dodge Walk-Thru (1961–79), delivery van/chassis-cab
- Dodge 50 (1979–92), successor to Walk-Thru (launched after sale of Chrysler Europe)
- Karrier Bantam, light truck
- Commer V-series/Karrier Gamecock, light/medium truck
- Commer C-series, medium truck
- Commer Commando/Dodge 100 (1970–89), successor to previous Karrier/Commer light/medium trucks
- Dodge 500/K-series, medium/heavy truck

The Spanish-built heavy truck range inherited from Barreiros were rebranded Dodge 300 in the 1970s, and continued in production until re-branded as Renaults in the 1980s.

== Locations ==
Chrysler UK had several plants in Coventry, including the Ryton assembly plant, the Stoke Aldermoor engine plant, the design, engineering and development site at Whitley and Hills Precision, the plastics factory in Canterbury Street, as well as the vehicle manufacturing plant at Linwood in Scotland.
