= Commer FC =

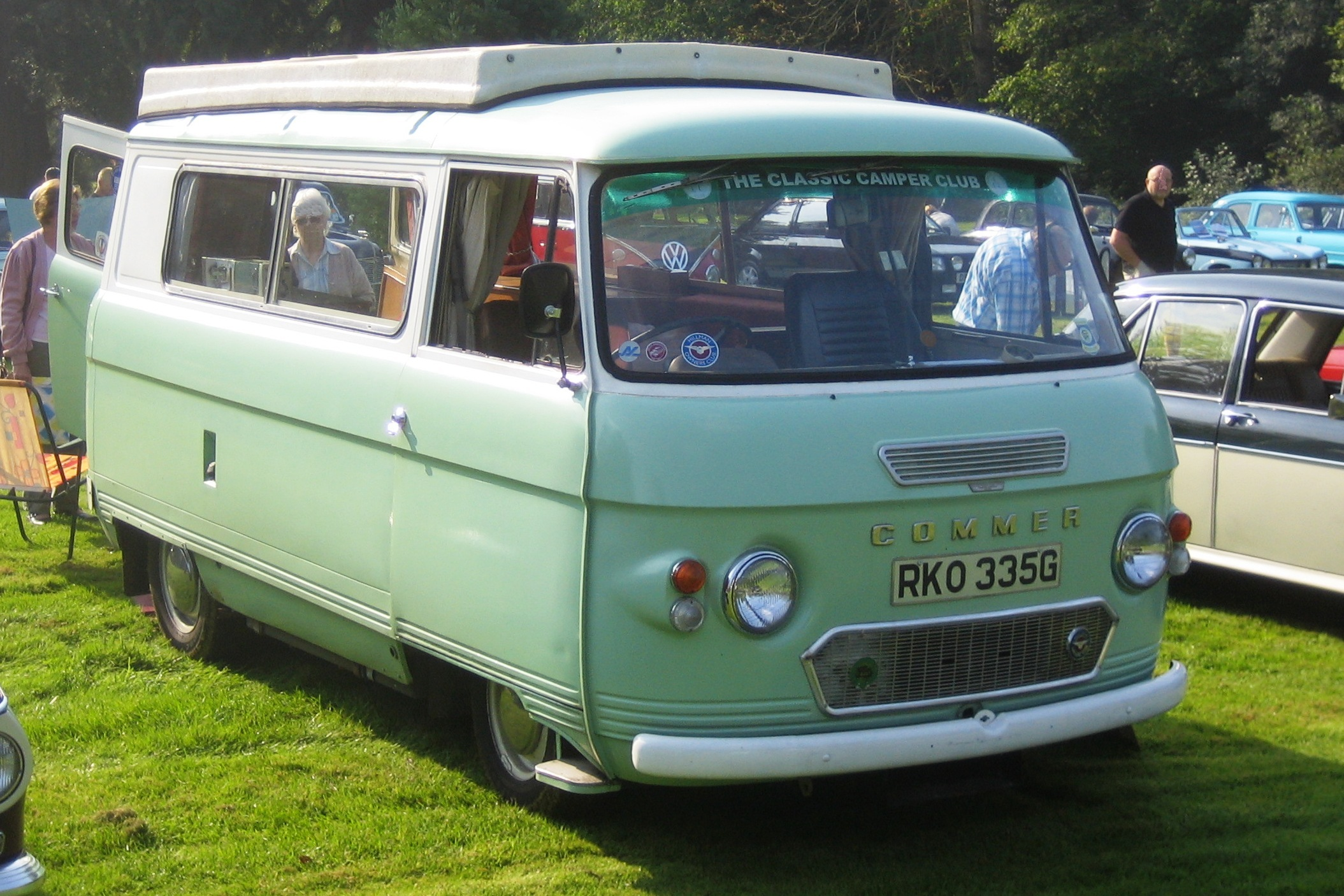

Overview
- Manufacturer: Rootes Group; Chrysler Europe; Renault Trucks
- Also called: Commer PB; Commer SpaceVan; Dodge SpaceVan
- Production: 1960–1983

Body and chassis
- Body style: Forward control panel van. Numerous conversions and adaptations to special purposes

Powertrain
- Engine: 1,494 cc (91.2 cu in) I4; 1,592 cc (97.1 cu in) I4; 1,724 cc (105.2 cu in) I4; 1,621 cc (98.9 cu in) Perkins 4.99 diesel I4; 1,760 cc (107 cu in) Perkins 4.108 diesel I4
- Transmission: 4-speed manual; 4-speed manual + Laycock overdrive (from 1973); Automatic (special order)

Dimensions
- Length: 170 in (4,318 mm)
- Width: 75 in (1,905 mm)
- Kerb weight: 1,200–1,499 kg (2,646–3,305 lb)

Chronology
- Predecessor: Commer Express
- Successor: Talbot Express; Dodge 50 series

The Commer FC was a forward control commercial vehicle produced by Commer from 1960 to 1976. During its lifespan, it was developed into the Commer PB in 1967, and the Commer SpaceVan in 1974. After the Rootes Group, which owned Commer, was purchased by Chrysler, the SpaceVan was also sold under the Dodge, DeSoto and Fargo marques. From 1976 onwards, the van was only sold as the Dodge SpaceVan, and it remained in production until 1983.

== History ==
Commer became known in later years as a maker of vans for the British Post Office—particularly the Commer FC which was introduced in 1960 with many body styles, including a 1,500 cc (92 cu in) van. After engine and interior upgrades it was renamed the PB in 1967 and the SpaceVan in 1974. Following the merger of Rootes Group with Chrysler to form Chrysler Europe, the SpaceVan was sold as a Dodge and Fargo model until 1976, when both Commer and Fargo names were dropped. These were rounded-front forward-control vans with narrow front track—a legacy of their Humber car-derived suspension. Utilising at first the Hillman-derived 1,500 cc (92 cu in) four-cylinder engine in the PA series, then the larger 1,600 cc (98 cu in), and from 1968 onwards the 1,725 cc (105.3 cu in) unit in the PB, only the cast-iron-head version of this engine were used. A Perkins 4108 diesel was also available.

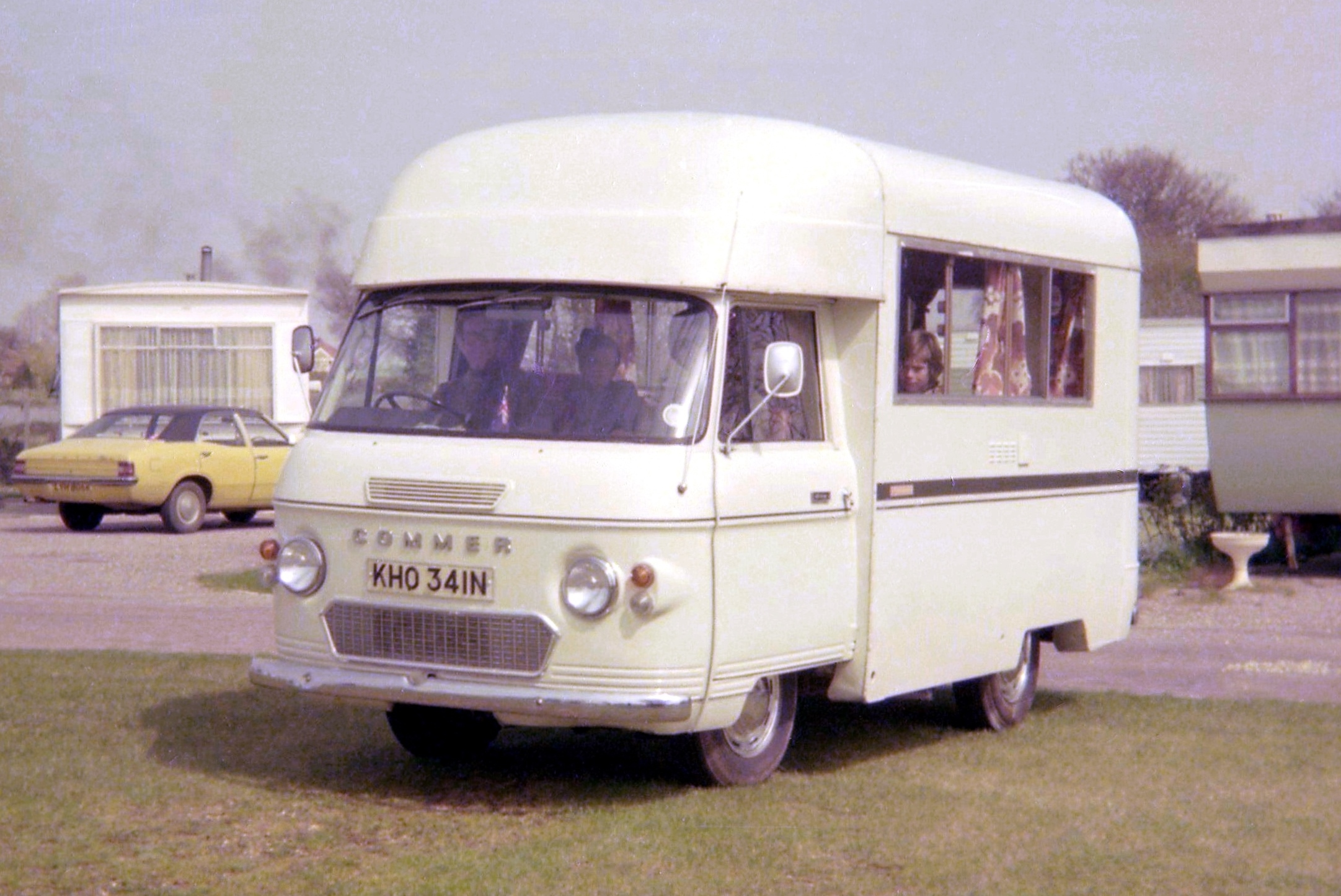
A 1975 Commer Highwayman motor caravan, photographed in 1977

The "1725 cc engine" (as it is known; it actually displaces 1,724 cc (105.2 cu in)) was available in the 1970s with a Borg Warner (BW) Model 35 three-speed automatic transmission with a dashboard-mounted selector. This was not a popular option and few were built.

The four-speed gearbox on manual transmission models was based on those fitted to contemporary Hillman Minx (of the "Audax" generation) and later Rootes Arrow series cars such as the Hillman Hunter.

An unusual feature of the model was that the handbrake operated on the front drum brakes.

One of the reasons that the van was less popular with fleet operators than the Bedford and Ford Transit models it sold against was that, as on the BMC J2 and J4 models the forward-control design restricted access to the engine and made engine changes labour-intensive; the only way to remove the engine without dropping the suspension subframe was to crane the engine out through the passenger door. A 1974 road test of a motor caravan version fitted with the 1725 cc engine reported a maximum speed of 70 mph (110 km/h) and a 0–50 mph (80 km/h) time of 25 seconds, indicating a higher top speed but, in this form, slower acceleration than the BMC competitor. However, the testers reported that at 70 mph (110 km/h) the van was "plainly at its absolute limit, screaming away in a most distressing fashion"; readers were advised to view 65 mph (105 km/h) as a more realistic absolute maximum.

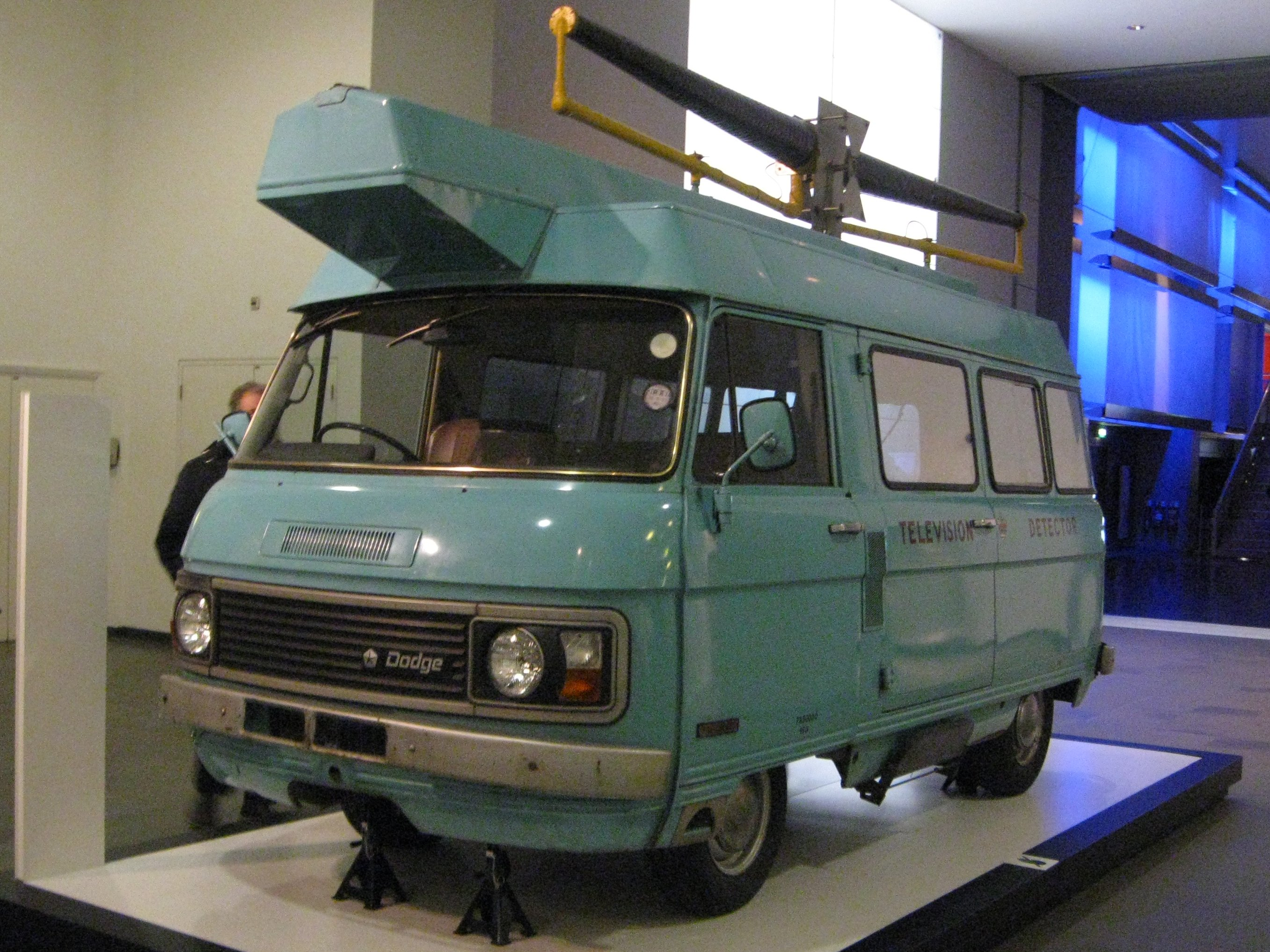
A Dodge SpaceVan TV detector van on display at Science Museum, London, as of January 2015

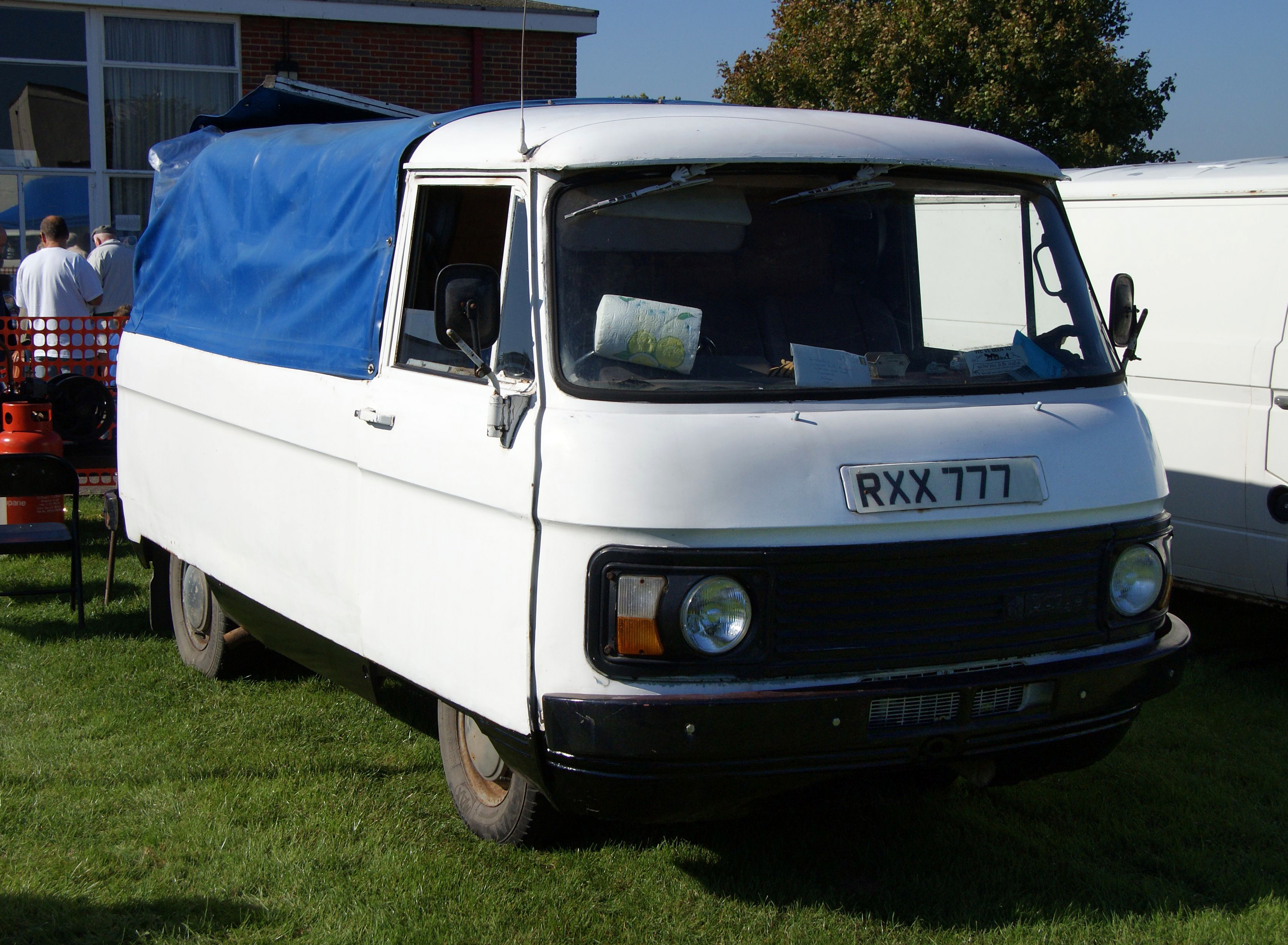
A 1980 Dodge SpaceVan pickup

Reportedly, one condition of the government bailout of Chrysler's British operations in 1976 was a commitment to upgrade the Spacevan, which was praised for its brakes, cornering, and price, but criticized for its power, comforts, and top speed. A revised Spacevan was thus introduced in 1977, using the same mechanicals but with numerous cosmetic changes, conveniences, and a new interior. Although outdated by its demise in 1982, the Spacevan remained a familiar sight in the UK thanks to its role with Post Office Telecommunications whose contract was almost solely responsible for it remaining in production after the acquisition of Commer by Peugeot. The extant fleet and outstanding orders were inherited by British Telecom on its formation in October 1981. By this time, there were three engines: two 1.7 L petrol engines of either 50 hp (37 kW) (with low compression) or 58 hp (43 kW) (with high compression), and a 1.8-litre Perkins diesel engine with 42 hp (31 kW), with a four-speed manual transmission and no automatic available. The last Spacevan was built in 1983.

Under PSA's management, the Dodge SpaceVan was succeeded by a rebadged version of the Peugeot J5 (itself a rebadged Fiat Ducato) called the "Talbot Express"; it was only available for the UK market. On the other hand, Renault Trucks (who had bought the truck division of Chrysler Europe) offered the Dodge 50 series as the successor to the SpaceVan, being available as both a van, chassis cab and pickup - thus offering a wider variety of body styles than the Talbot Express. Nevertheless, the 50 series range was significantly bigger and heavier than the SpaceVan.

In contrary to its rivals, which had disappeared from everyday streetscape during the previous years, the Dodge SpaceVan remained a familiar sight on British roads up until the mid-1990s.

== New Zealand production ==
This van was produced in New Zealand by Todd Motors at their Petone Factory. It was last produced in 1974 in their secondary body factory on the other side to the railway tracks from the main car assembly plant. They produced a standard panel van, a mini bus body with sliding side windows, and cab and chassis models. The seats for the mini bus were produced by other coach builders. They used the high compression steel head motors; not the alloy head Hillman Hunter units.

Generally, one unit was produced in the morning and another unit in the afternoon; i.e. 10 units per week, a third unit could be produced each day when sales were higher.

== See also ==
- Ford Thames 400E – similarly sized vans from the same period
- Morris Commercial J4
