= Wright Consort =

Step-entrance bus body

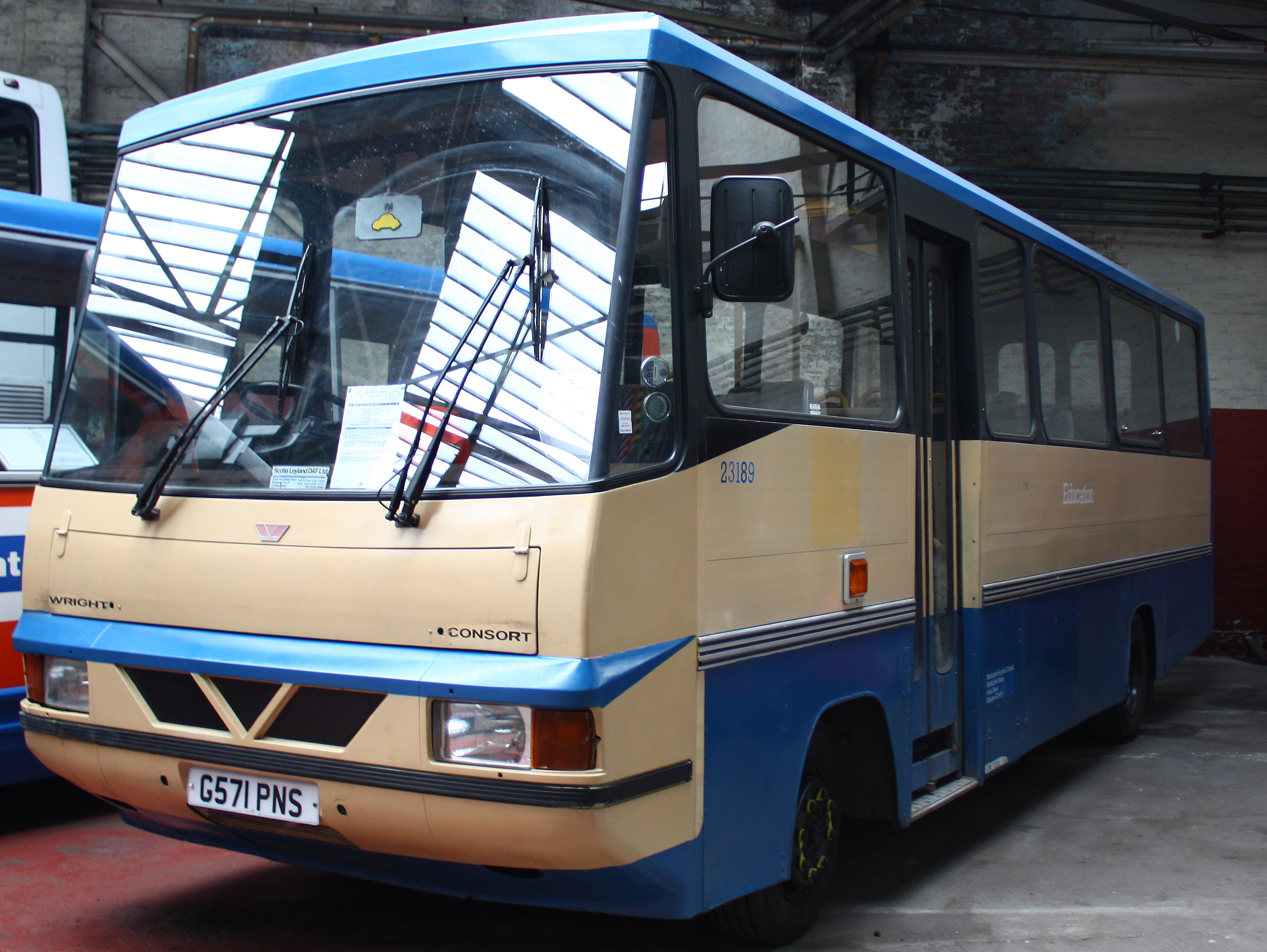
- Preserved Strathclyde Regional Council Wright Consort bodied Leyland DAF Roadrunner at the Glasgow Vintage Vehicle Trust

Overview
- Manufacturer: Wrightbus
- Production: 1988–1992
- Assembly: Ballymena, Northern Ireland

Body and chassis
- Doors: 1 or 2
- Floor type: Step Entrance
- Chassis: Dennis Javelin; Iveco Ford 79.14; Leyland DAF Roadrunner; Leyland Swift; Renault Commando

The Wright Consort was a step-entrance bus body built by Wrightbus on various chassis from 1988 until 1992.

The Consort body was available on multiple different chassis such as the Leyland Swift, Iveco Ford, Leyland DAF R-series, Renault Dodge Commando, and Dennis Javelin chassis.

== Preservation ==
Wright Consort-bodied Leyland DAF Roadrunner G571 PNS entered service as a disabled transport vehicle with Strathclyde Regional Council in February 1990 as bus 23189, transferring to East Renfrewshire District Council upon the abolishment of Strathclyde in 1996. This bus was donated to the Glasgow Vintage Vehicle Trust (GVVT) in 2008 and can still be seen at many events at the GVVT's Bridgeton Bus Garage site to this day.
