= Dodge 50 Series =

British light truck family

- 1980 Dodge 50

Overview
- Manufacturer: Chrysler Europe; Renault Trucks
- Also called: Renault 50 series
- Production: 1979–1993

Body and chassis
- Class: Light commercial vehicle (M); Large van
- Related: Dodge B series

Powertrain
- Engine: petrol: 2.2 L J7T I4; diesel: 3.9 L Perkins 4.236 I4; 4.0 L Perkins Phaser I4; 4.1 L Perkins 6.247 I6

Chronology
- Predecessor: Dodge Spacevan; Dodge Walk-Thru
- Successor: Renault B series

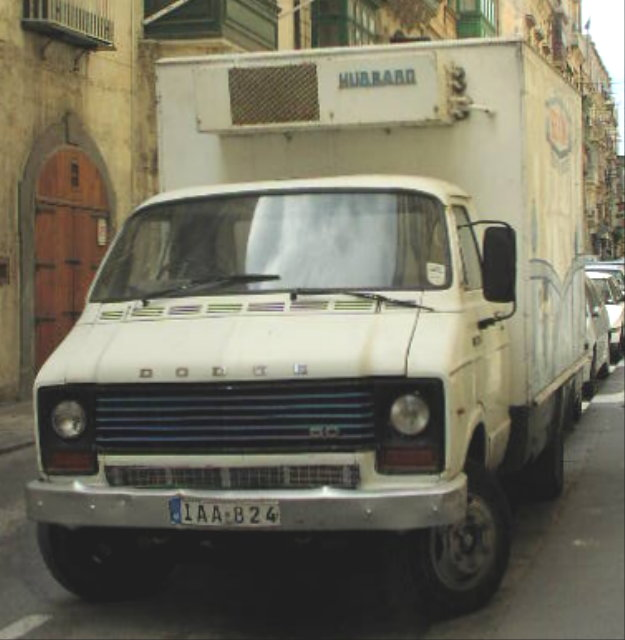
Dodge 50 with refrigeration unit for "Benna"-Milk in Malta

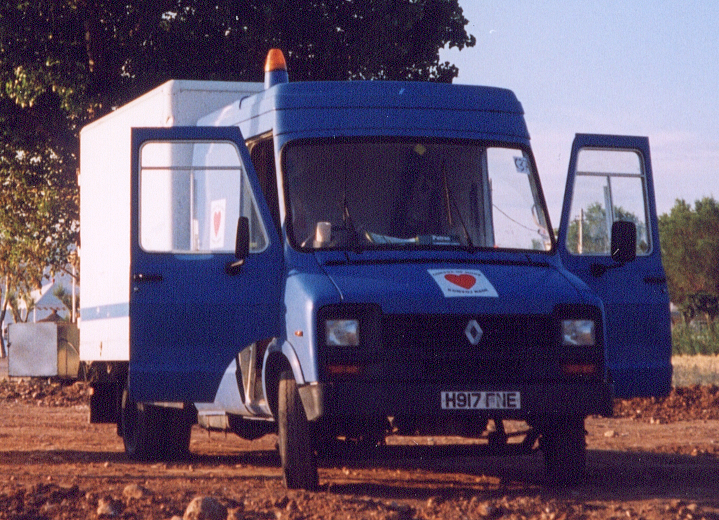
Renault Dodge 50 "B56" (5600kg) with crew-cab and box body, formerly of British Gas, seen here working for Aid Convoy on a humanitarian project to the former Yugoslavia.

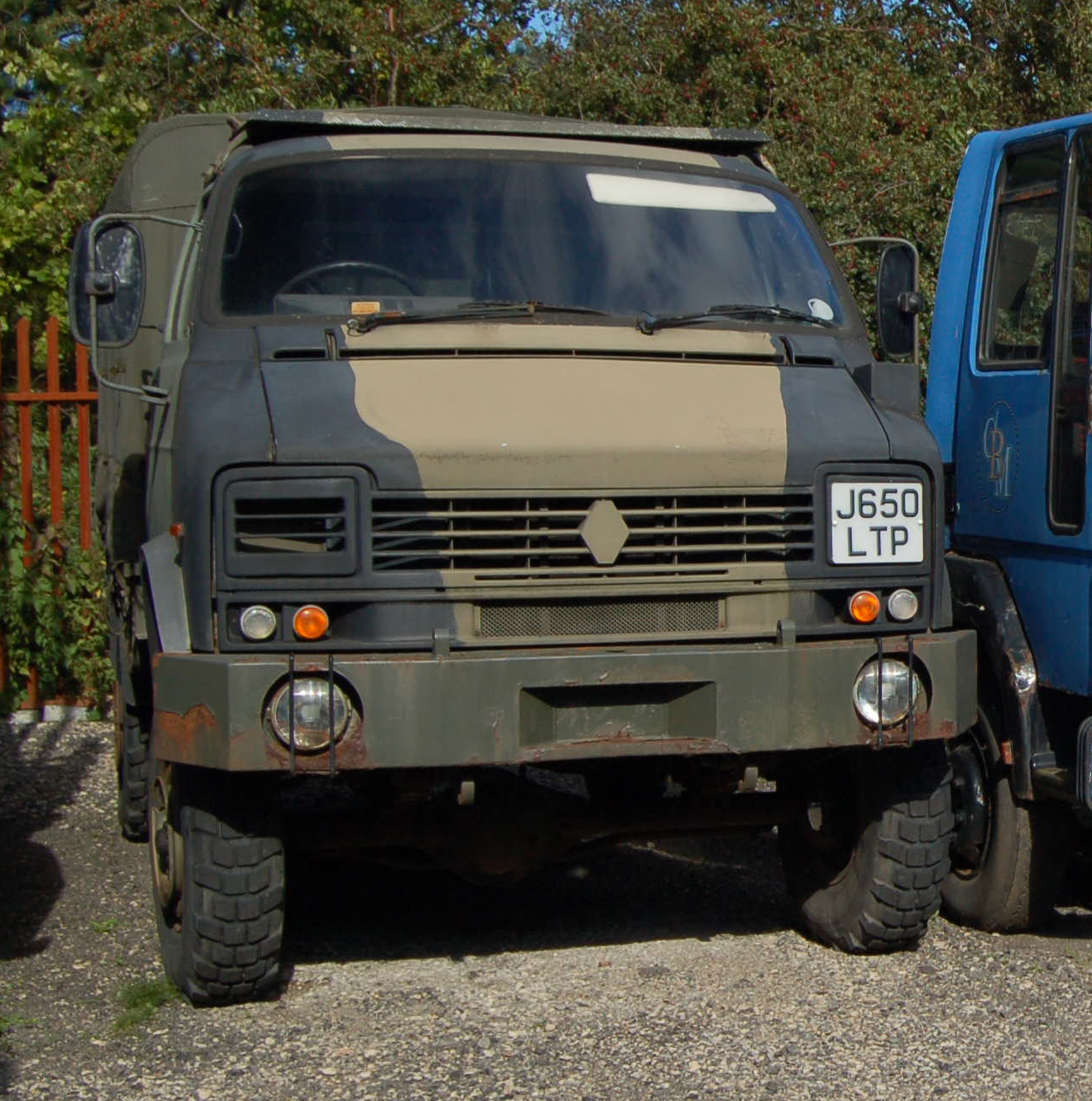
4x4 Reynolds Boughton RB44 of the British Army

The Dodge 50 Series, later known as the Renault 50 Series, were light commercial vehicles produced in the UK by Chrysler Europe and later Renault Véhicules Industriels between 1979 and 1993 as a replacement for the earlier Dodge Walk-Thru stepvan and smaller Dodge Spacevan cab-over van. To save costs at a time when Chrysler Europe was in financial peril the series utilised some panels - notably the doors and upper wings - from the American Dodge B series vans, modified to cater for European regulations and needs. The chassis, however, was British-designed and did not share any parts with American products.

The 50 series included a wide range of chassis and body configurations, including two distinctly different cab designs, and spanned the 3,500–7,500 kg (7,700–16,500 lb) revenue weight range. Various engines were offered, including the Perkins Phaser and 4.236 diesels.

The RB44, a four-wheel-drive version based loosely on the Dodge van, was built by Reynolds Boughton (now known as Boughton Engineering) in the early 1990s.

== Versions ==
Dodge 50 Series S35 pickup (flatbed in America).

Bodybuilding companies converted many into various configurations from tipper trucks to buses. Many were built as "chassis cabs" to have box bodies fitted; these were widely used by utility companies in the UK. They often came fitted with compressors and generators. Gradually this kind of vehicle fell out of favour, partly due to reliability issues relating to combining plant equipment with the vehicle drivetrain. The vehicle is otherwise toughly built. The utility companies today favour smaller vans with towed generators.

The RB44 four-wheel-drive version saw some use with the British army since it was one of very few British-built trucks of the class, and it could carry considerably more cargo and equipment than even the largest Land Rover models.

== The transition to Renault branding ==
By the 1970s, having inherited various struggling car and commercial vehicle marques (and factories) from the Rootes Group, notably the commercial concerns Commer and Karrier, in addition to various French concerns and Barreiros (manufacturer) in Spain, Chrysler Europe were struggling to return a profit. In 1978, they pulled out of their European operations altogether, selling their car operations to Peugeot. Peugeot had little interest in larger commercial vehicles and instead their factory in Dunstable was run in partnership with Renault Véhicules Industriels, who had sought a UK production site for engines for their existing Renault-branded models. Chrysler's cars and small vans were subsequently sold by Peugeot under the Talbot brand.

Renault continued manufacturing the 50 Series, which after all was a new design, alongside the smaller Dodge (formerly Commer) Spacevan and the larger Dodge 100 / Commando 2 Series of 7,500–23,000 kg (16,500–50,700 lb) trucks. Until 1984, the 50 Series was marketed as being produced by Karrier Motors Ltd, the transition to Renault branding being gradual, with some vehicles bearing both a Dodge name and a Renault diamond badge.

=== Renault 50 ===
Renault 50 Series R35 HCV

By 1987, the 50 Series had been updated and re-badged as the Renault 50 Series; the UK incarnation of the Dodge marque ceased to be used for new vehicles. (Chrysler maintained an entirely separate Dodge brand in the U.S., and in 2006 began re-introducing Dodge car models from the USA into the UK market). Renault continued to manufacture the 50 Series until it closed the Dunstable factory in March 1993, but it was never a great sales success for them, being forced to compete with Renault's Master van, which Renault favoured in its export markets.

In 1994, Renault sold the production tooling to a Leamington Spa-based company, RDS Automotive, who intended to establish a light trucks project in China.

== See also ==
- Dodge 100 "Commando"
- Dodge 500
