= Dodge 500 =

1964 British heavy goods vehicle

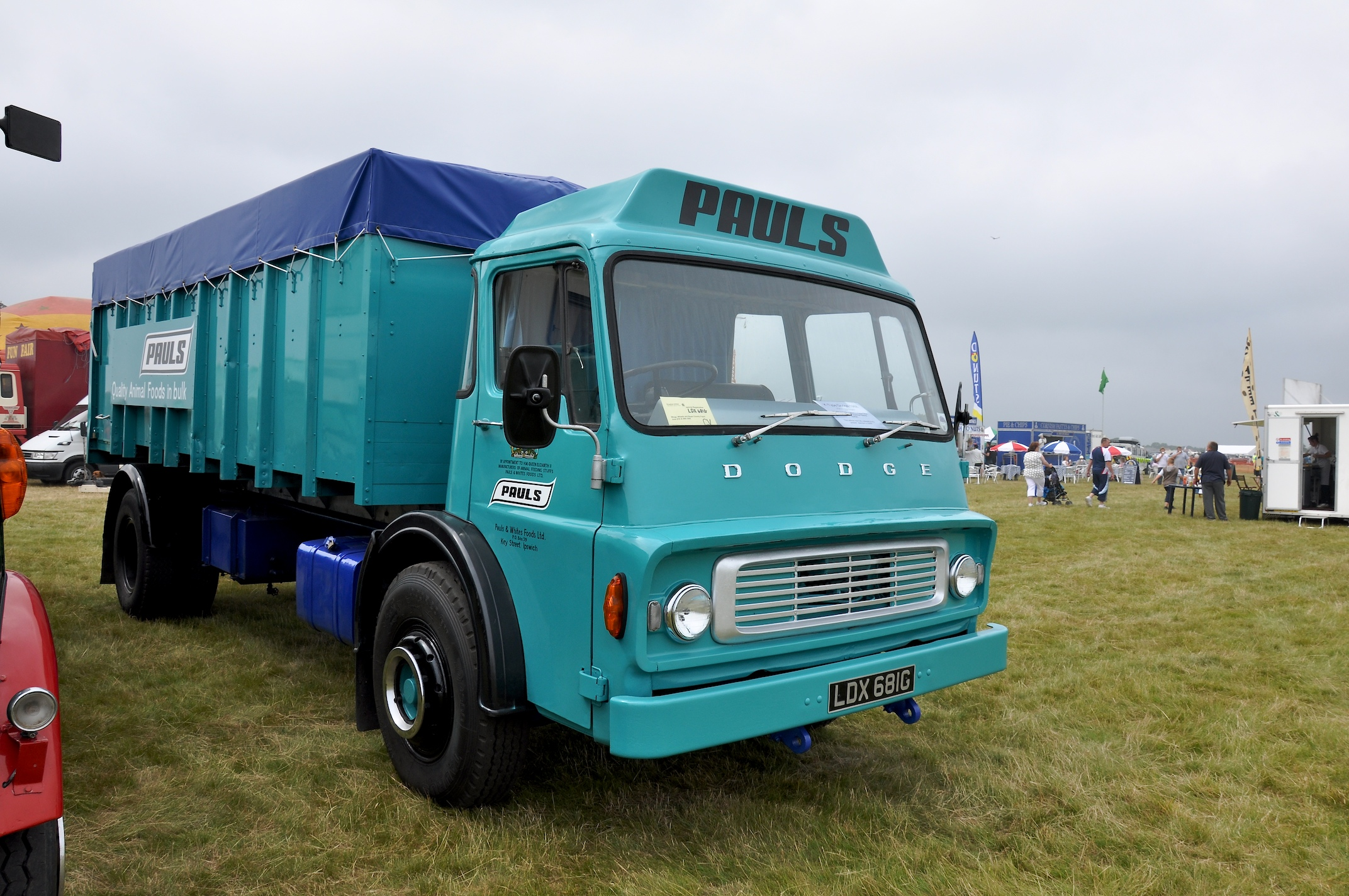
1968 Dodge K, originally sold as the "500"

The Dodge 500 was a heavy duty truck introduced in 1964 and built in the United Kingdom by Dodge. It replaced Dodge UK's earlier 300 series cab over trucks.

== History and development ==
Popular in Britain, and also used in some export markets, the Dodge 500 was also sometimes badged as a DeSoto or Fargo. The trucks were sold as a cab and chassis and the operators arranged for the purchase of the bodies or trailers. Later this range came to be known as the "K"-series.

The 500 Series was developed in the early 1960s, with styling by Ghia and engineering by Rootes Group in Kew, England. The suspension used leaf springs in front and rear with optional rear auxiliary springs. The truck was diesel powered, with forward control and a tilt cab; it was launched in December 1964. Customers obtained the trucks in primer and painted them. The cabs were noted for their styling, roominess and comfort, visibility of the road, and engine placement with minimal intrusion into the cab.

Payload capacities ranged up to 11 short tons (10.0 t) for two-axle units, up to 16 short tons (15 t) for three-axle units, or a gross combined vehicle weight of up to 67,000 lb (30,000 kg) for the tractors. Those desiring lighter capacity trucks were directed to the Dodge 100.

With the help of the supplier, a special high tensile steel alloy was developed to lighten the frame. Tubular and channel section cross members were bolted to the frame side-members. Spring hanger brackets were also bolted to the frame, utilizing the cross members where possible. Cummins and Perkins diesel engines were used.

Buyers had a choice of a Cummins diesel — V6 or V8 — producing 130–170 hp (97–127 kW) and 248-328 pound-feet of torque, or a locally made Perkins diesel with 120 hp (89 kW) and 260 lb⋅ft (353 N⋅m) of torque. These were known to be reliable powerplants. An existing time-tested manual transmission was used.

== See also ==
- Dodge 50 Series
- Dodge 100 "Commando"
