= Dodge 300 =

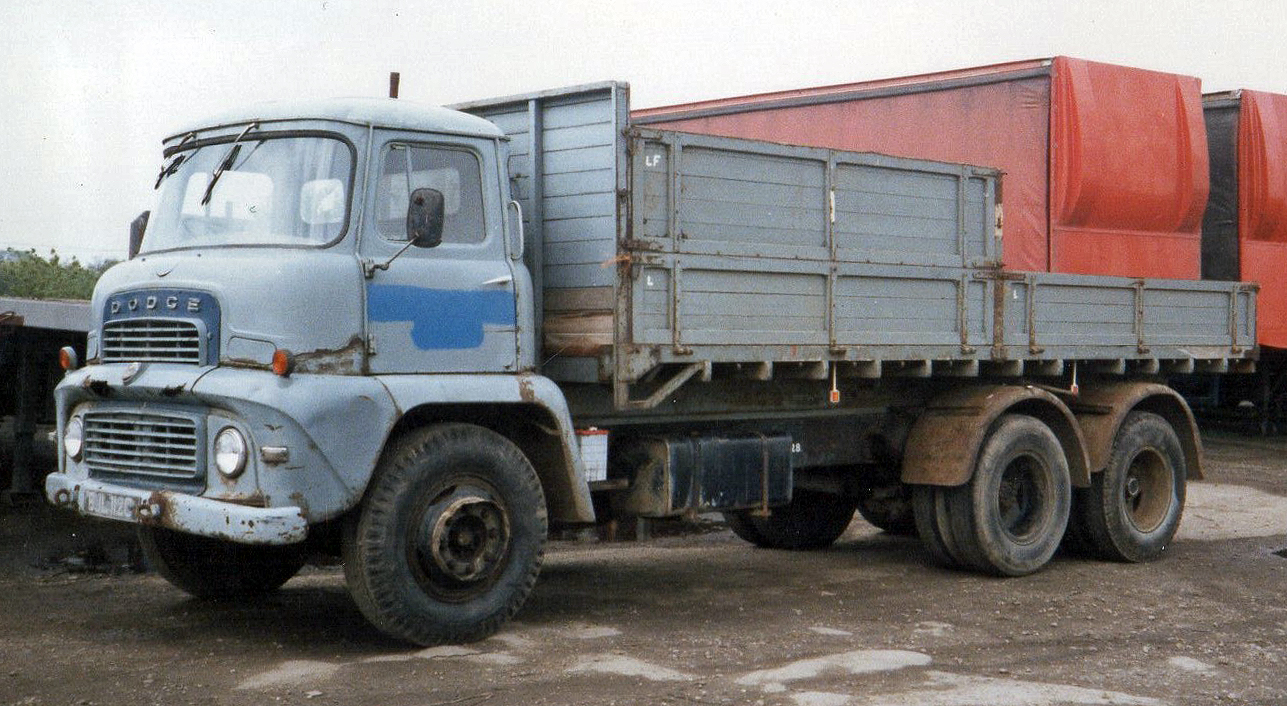

Overview
- Manufacturer: Dodge UK
- Production: 1957-1965
- Assembly: Kew, United Kingdom

Body and chassis
- Body style: Cab over
- Platform: LAD cab

Chronology
- Successor: Dodge 500

The Dodge 300 was a medium- to heavy-duty cab over truck built by Dodge's British arm at their Kew plant from 1957 until the mid-1960s. It was replaced by the Ghia-designed Dodge 500 which appeared in late 1964. Following the retirement of the 300, Dodge's Kew plant was shuttered as production was moved to Dunstable.

== Design ==
Truck and tractor models were available, as well as a four-wheel drive model for military use. The weight range offered was from 5 to 9 long tons (5,100 to 9,100 kg), with the tractor models being rated for 10 or 12 long tons (10,200 or 12,200 kg). Most Dodge 300s received diesel engines from Perkins.

The Motor Panels cab design used was shared with Leyland and Albion. It is therefore often referred to as the "LAD" cab (Leyland-Albion-Dodge).

== Bus models ==
A bus variant of the Dodge 300 was developed in the early 1960s, but only eight were built. A prototype model S306 with a Leyland engine and Weymann bus body was built in 1962 (registered 2498PK), followed by a model S307 with Perkins engine and Marshall bus body in 1964 (registered 3033PE). These were used as demonstrators by Dodge, but the only orders which resulted were for six S307 models with Strachans coach bodies which were delivered to Rickards of Brentford later in 1964 (registered AYV93B to AYV98B).

== 1972–1982 models ==
From 1972 on, a new Dodge 300 series of heavy lorries was sold in the UK. These were made in Spain by Chrysler Spanish subsidiary, and included a 38-tonne tractor and four, six and eighth-wheelers rigids. Sales took off well, and the model was not dropped until 1982, well after Renault Véhicules Industriels took control of Chrysler Europe truck operations.
