= Dodge 100 "Commando" =

Trucks built by Dodge in England

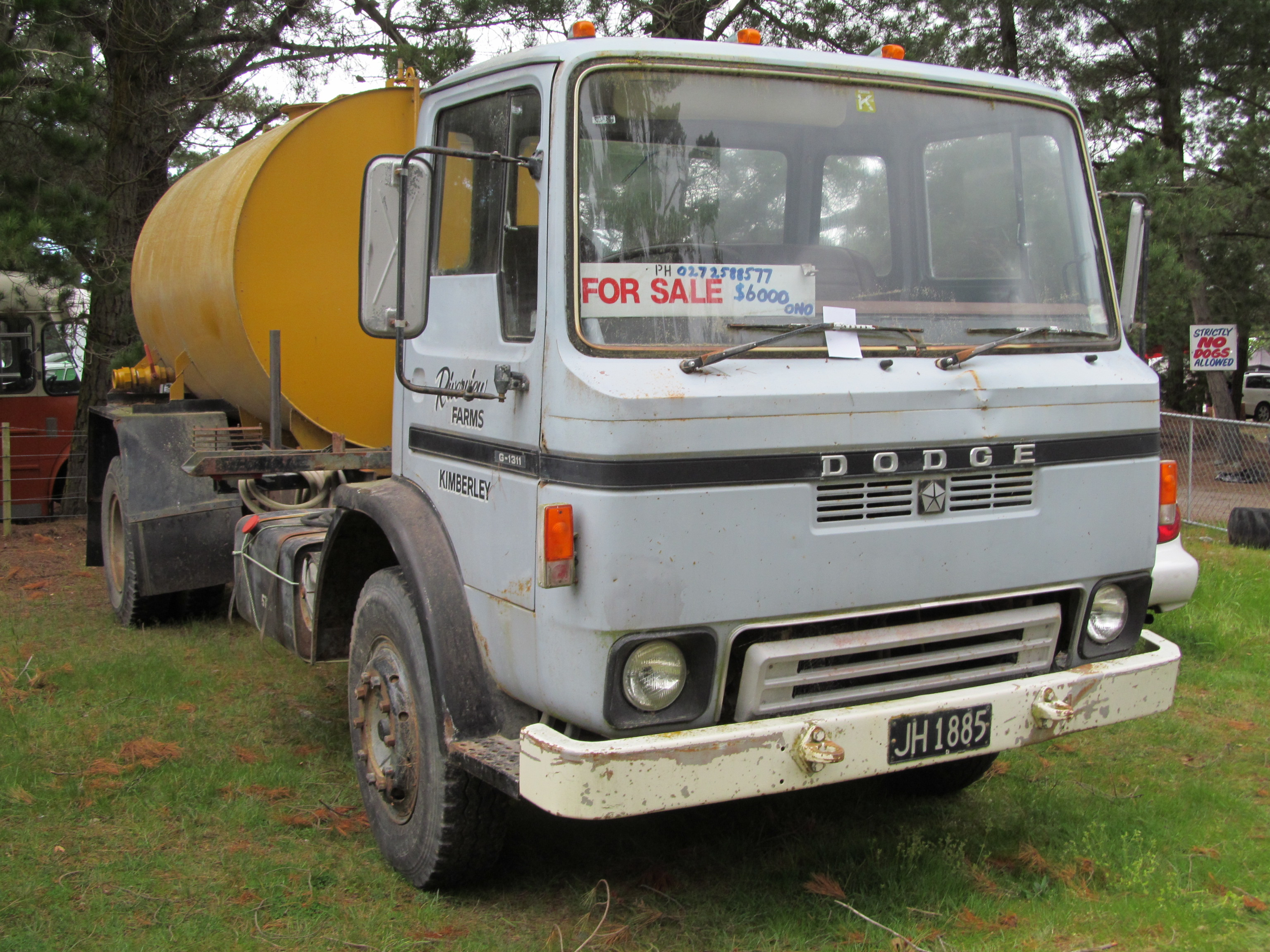
Dodge 100 (1980)

The Dodge 100 "Commando" models also known as Dodge Commando 100 Series are 7.5–28 short tons (6.8–25.4 t) trucks built by Dodge in England, primarily in the 1970s and 1980s. A previous Dodge 100, known informally as the "parrot-nose" or "Kew Dodge", was produced in the 1950s at a factory in Kew, London.

== History and development ==
Originally developed by Commer, the range was first built as a concept in 1965-66, to replace the Commer VC and VE range with 8–24 short tons (7.3–21.8 t) gross vehicle weight (GVW). As Chrysler Europe acquired a controlling interest in Commer's owner, the Rootes Group, the truck design and name were changed to complement the Dodge 500 trucks.

=== Drivetrains ===
The Dodge 100 was intended to use a Rootes diesel engine, but noise regulations ruled out the reliable but noisy Rootes units. In the end, naturally aspirated and turbocharged four- and six-cylinder Perkins diesel engines (locally made in the UK) were used for lighter weights, with the Mercedes-Benz OM352 offered as a premium engine (due largely to the reputation of Mercedes in Europe, where Perkins was relatively unknown). Also, Valmet 611 CS diesels were installed for some limited market areas. Four-, five-, and six-speed synchromesh manual transmissions from Rootes were used, while rear axles are a mixture of Rootes Groups' own hypoid design and Eaton Corporation's single- and two-speed axles. The chassis use a special alloy for greater strength and lighter weight.

Final capacity ranges from 7.5–16 short tons (6.8–14.5 t) GVW for full vehicles and 24/28 tons GCW for tractors.

=== Renault ===
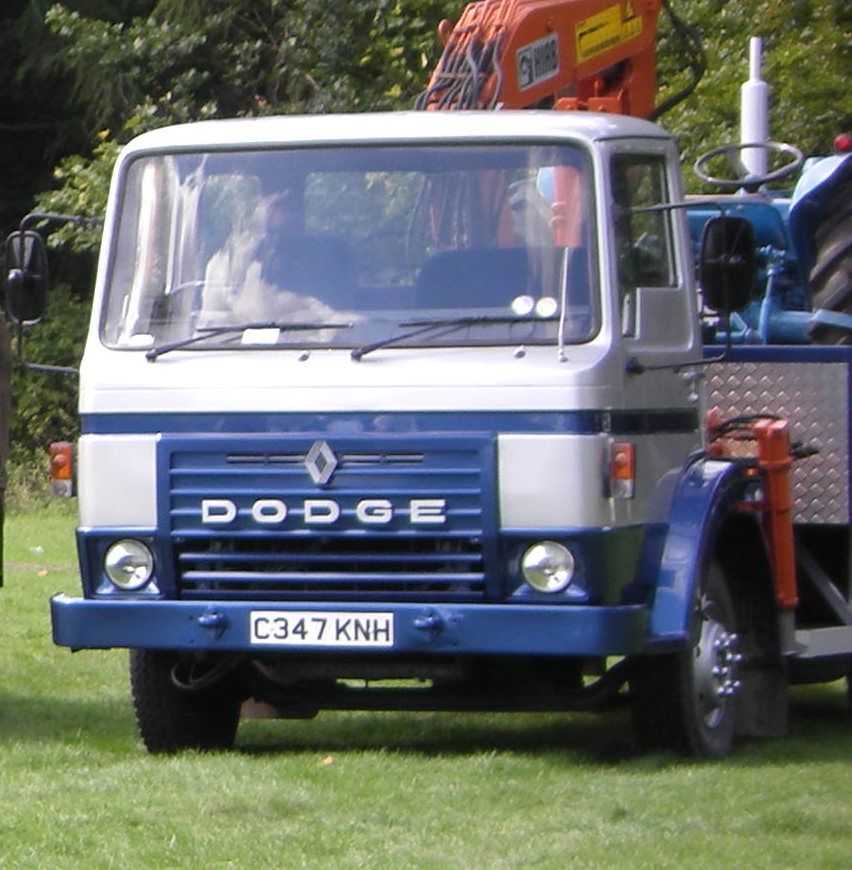
Dodge-Renault 100 Mk 2 with double badging

The 100 Series was in production for around 15 years in most areas of the world (though not in the United States, due to the costs that would have been involved in meeting local regulations). It was sold as a Commer, Dodge, DeSoto, Fargo and Renault. A "Mark 2" version has an upgraded engine other minor refinements. Eventually the Dodge 100 was eliminated by Renault, which had acquired the former Rootes Group truck operations after the car operations were purchased by Peugeot, though a Renault version of the Dodge 100 was built for a time; by 1987, it was being marketed as simply the "Renault Commando". Renault later switched production at the former Rootes factory to Renault's own bus and truck engines.

== See also ==
- Dodge 50 Series
- Dodge 500
