= Whitley plant =

Automobile facility in United Kingdom

JLR Whitley Engineering Centre
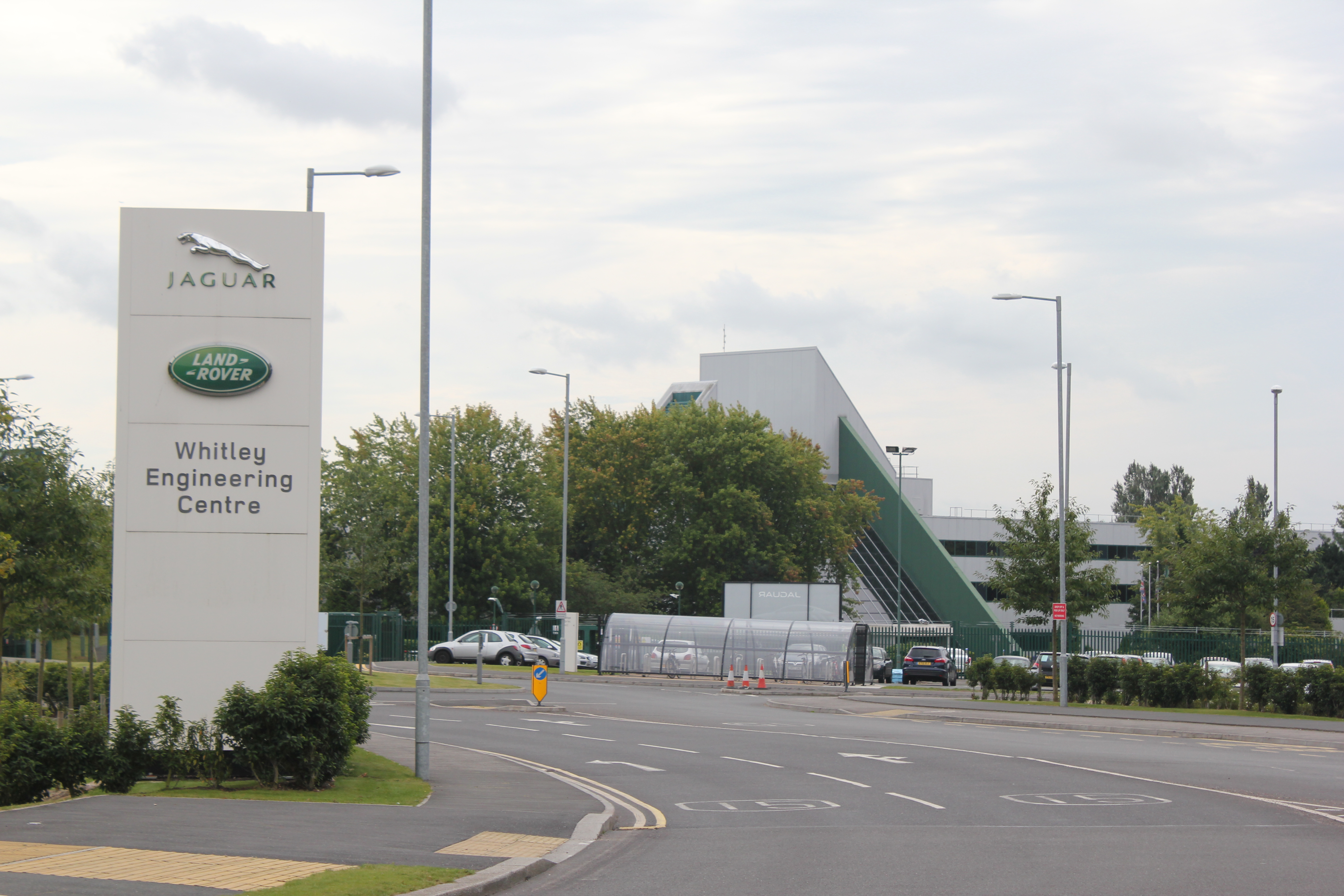
- View of the plant in 2012
- Operated: 1923–present
- Location: Abbey Road, Coventry, CV3 4LF; Whitley, Coventry
- Coordinates: 52.3830°N 1.4909°W
- Industry: Automotive
- Products: Aircraft; Automobiles
- Area: 52 acres (0.21 km^{2})
- Owner: List: Armstrong Whitworth (1920s–61); Hawker Siddeley (1969–69); Chrysler Europe (1969–78); PSA Group (1978–85); Jaguar Cars (1985–2013); Jaguar Land Rover (2013–present)

The Whitley plant, situated in Whitley, Coventry, United Kingdom, is the headquarters and one of the engineering centres of Jaguar Land Rover. The facility is a fully integrated design, research and development centre and is used for the design and development of Jaguar and Land Rover vehicles.

== History ==
The site now occupied by the Whitley plant was originally an aerodrome, built during the First World War.

In the early 1920s the site and its associated buildings were bought by Sir W.G. Armstrong Whitworth Aircraft Co. Ltd. From 1923 until the end of the Second World War several aircraft types, including the Armstrong Whitworth Siskin, the Hawker Hart biplanes and the Armstrong Whitworth Whitley bomber were built at the site.

After the Second World War, Armstrong Whitworth concentrated its guided missile work at the plant, including the development of the Seaslug surface-to-air missile. In 1968 Hawker Siddeley Dynamics, who had by then absorbed the Armstrong Whitworth company, closed the site with the loss of 2,260 jobs. Work being carried out at the site on the Nike-Ajax and Sea Dart missiles was transferred to Hawker Siddeley Dynamics plants in Hatfield, Cheadle Hulme and Lostock.

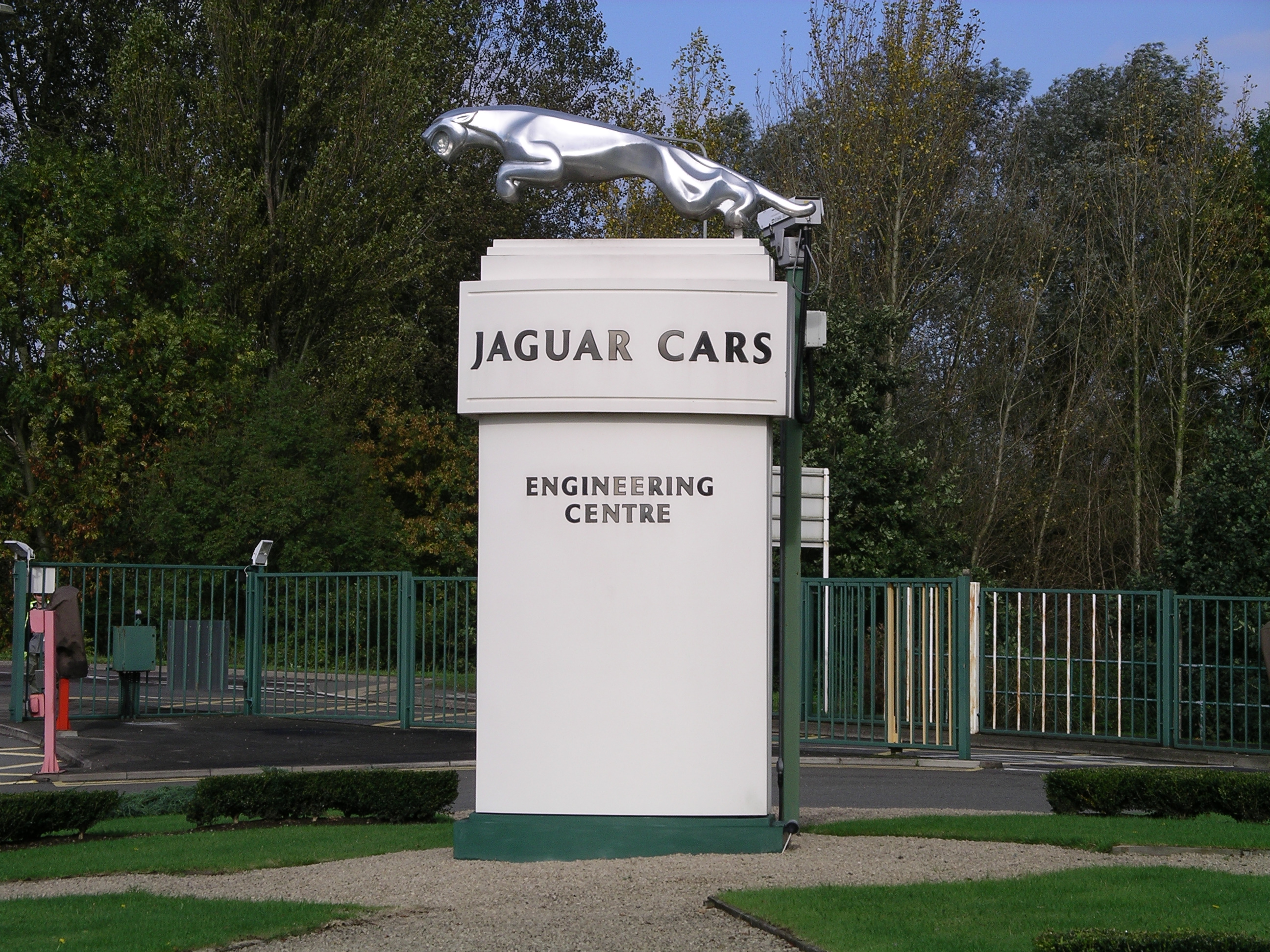
Jaguar emblem depicted at the entrance of the plant in 2006

The Rootes Group, by then owned by Chrysler Europe, purchased the 187-acre site from Hawker Siddeley Dynamics in 1969 for the purpose of centralising all its design and engineering teams onto one site. From 1970 Rootes used the site for the design of all their new trucks and cars.

In 1978 Chrysler sold its European operations to PSA Group, and the Whitley plant was taken over by Peugeot-Talbot. By 1985 Peugeot had moved all its design and development activities to Paris Hawtal Whiting design group used it for a short period then the newly privatised Jaguar Cars bought the plant and following a refurbishment, established its engineering centre there in 1987.

In 2005 Jaguar Cars moved its headquarters to join its engineering centre at the Whitley site, after scaling down its operations at its Browns Lane plant.

== Environment ==
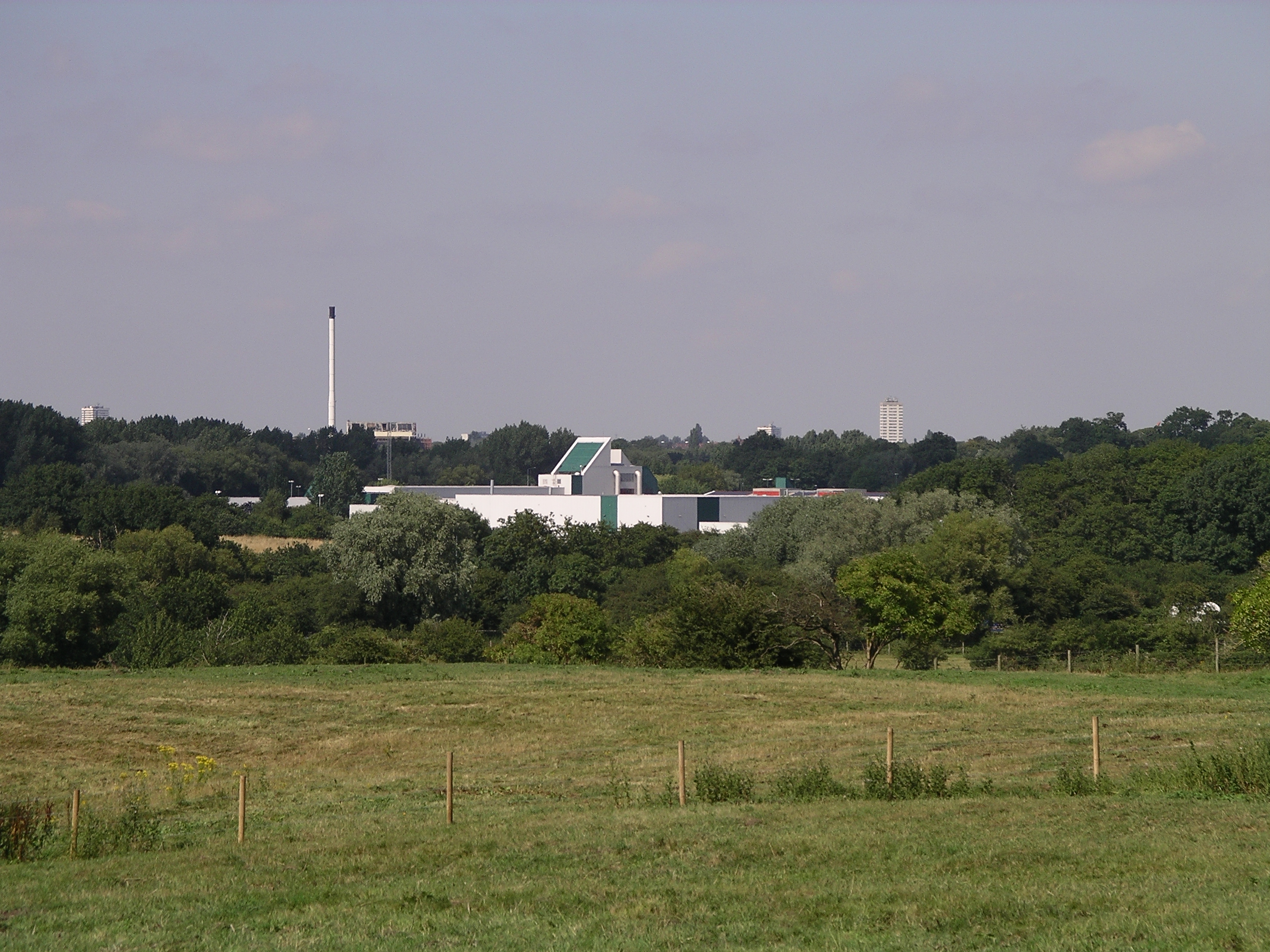
The Whitley plant and the surrounding green land in 2006

The Whitley plant is surrounded by green land, and a lake, woods and the River Sowe are nearby. Some of the former playing fields of Whitley Abbey Comprehensive School were sold by the council to Ford, who owned Jaguar at the time.

A major expansion of the Whitley facility and the building of a new industrial estate in the surrounding green fields and woods is a controversial local issue. The expansion would consume approximately 740 acres of greenbelt land, and Roxhill Developers, which is behind the project, is ultimately controlled by an offshore company domiciled in the Cayman Islands.

== See also ==
- Jaguar Land Rover Gaydon Centre
