= Fargo Trucks =

Brand of truck

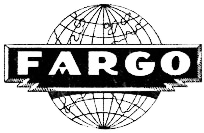
- Formerly: Fargo Motor Car Company of Chicago (1913–22)
- Type: Private (1913–22); Division (1928–78)
- Industry: Automotive
- Founded: 1913; 113 years ago
- Defunct: 1978; 48 years ago
- Fate: Acquired by Chrysler Corporation in 1928, became a brand. Sold to Askam Trucks in 1978, which ceased operations in 2015
- Successor: Askam; Ram Trucks
- Headquarters: Pilsen, Chicago (1913–22); Detroit (1928–78), U.S.
- Products: Trucks

Fargo was a brand of trucks originally produced in the United States in 1913 by the Fargo Motor Car Company. Dropped in 1922, the name was reintroduced for a line of trucks manufactured by the Chrysler Corporation after purchasing Fargo Motors in 1928. Later, Chrysler absorbed Dodge and started producing its truck line, so over time, Fargo trucks became rebadged Dodges, similar to the parallel sale by General Motors of its GMC and Chevrolet truck lines, as well as the Mercury truck brand used by Ford in Canada.

The modern-day descendant of Chrysler's truck division is now known as Ram Trucks.

== History ==
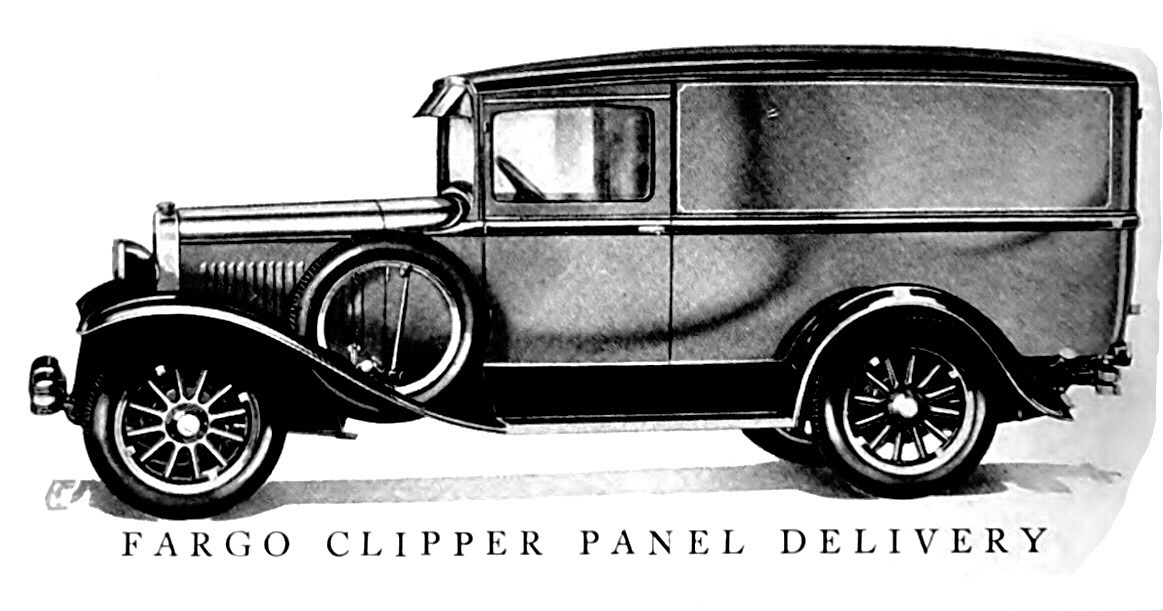
Fargo Clipper Six-cylinder engine, displacement 3205 cc, 55 HP (1929–1930)

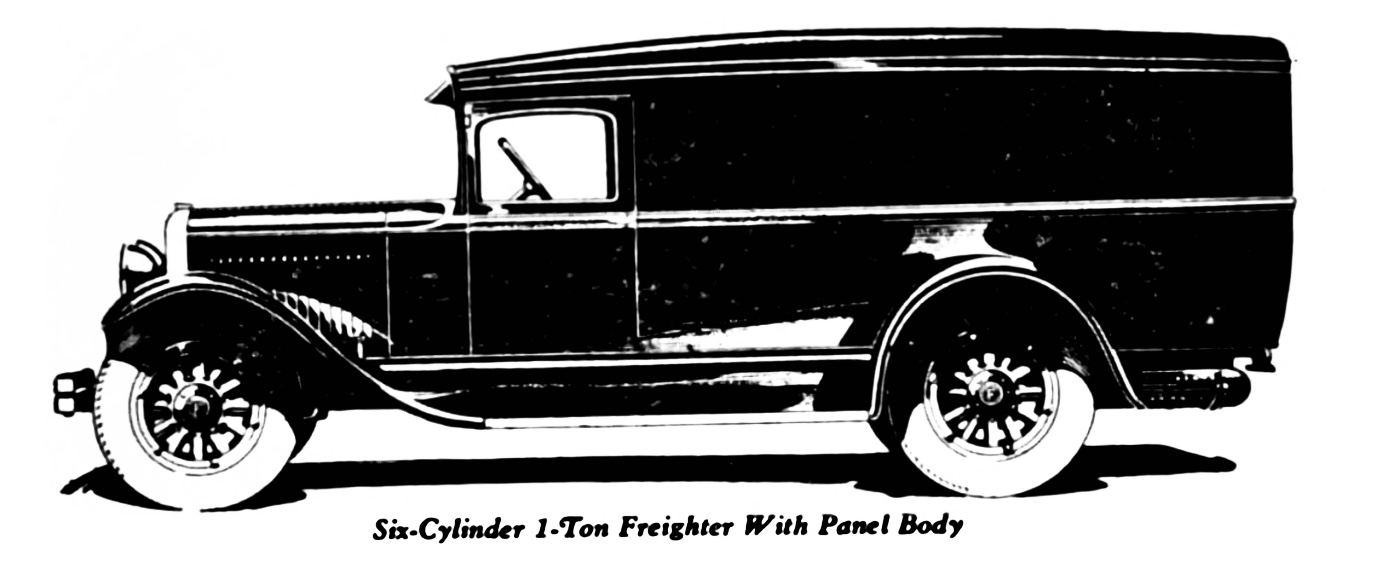
Fargo Freighter (1929–1931)

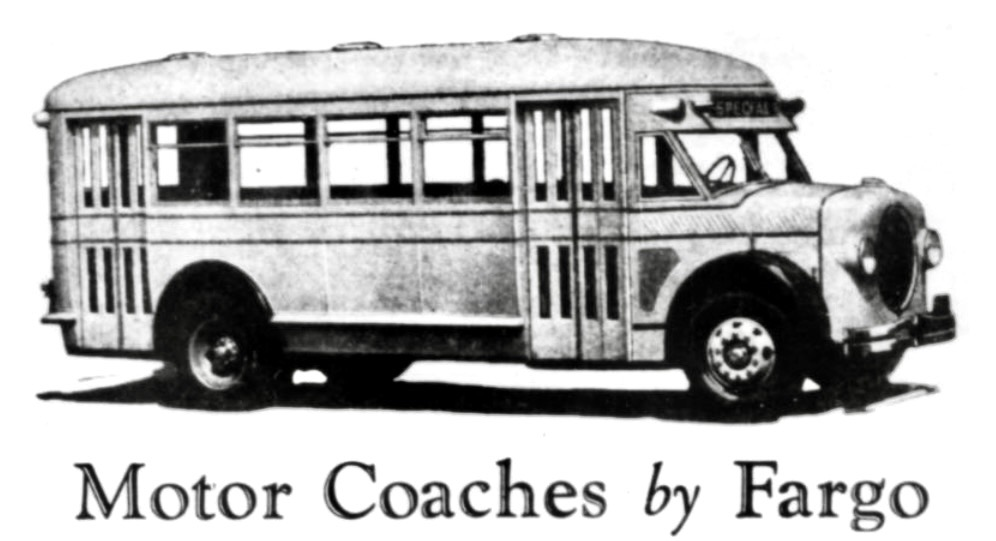
Fargo 21 Passenger bus (1930-1931)

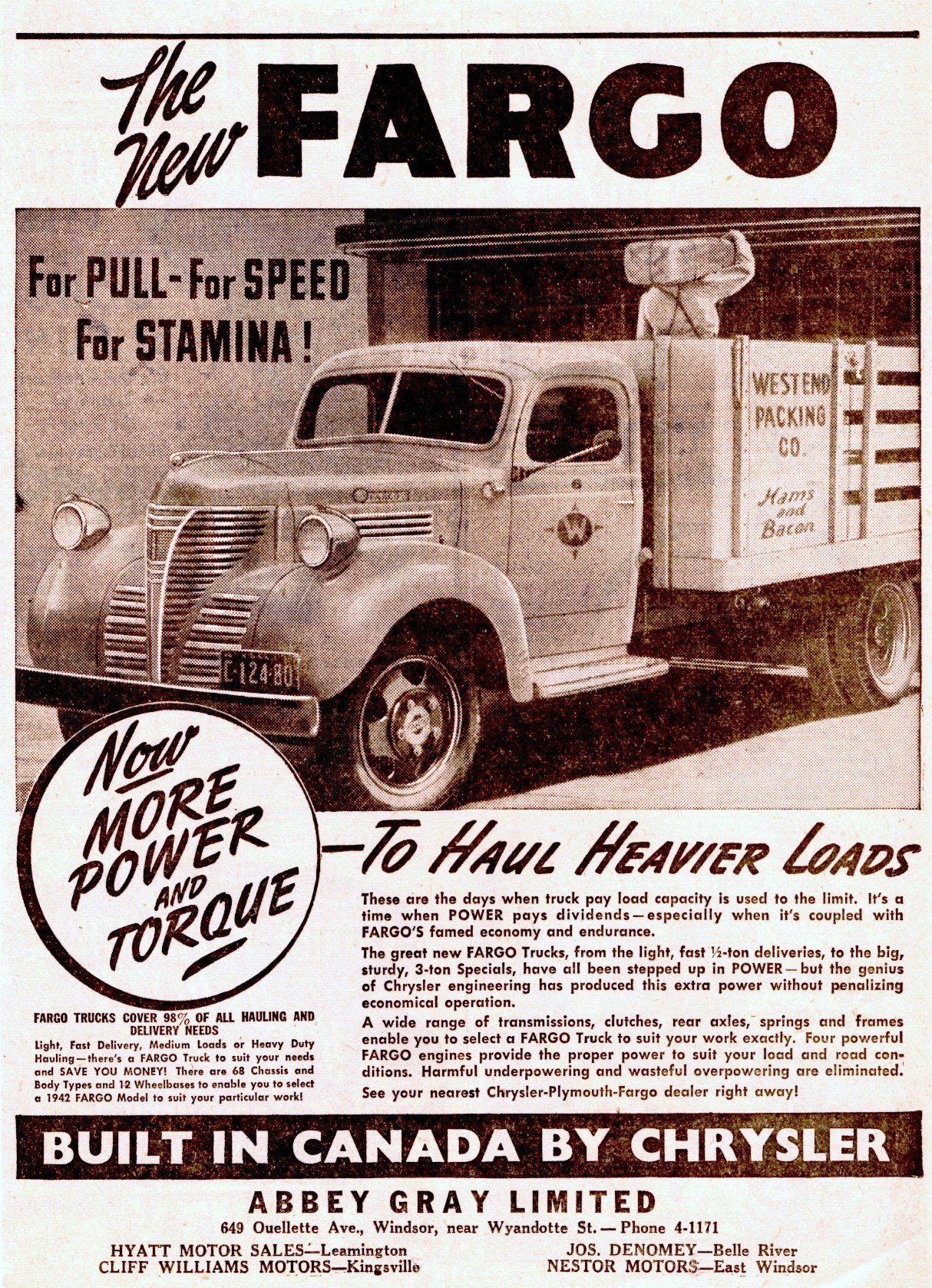
The 1942 Fargo trucks ranged from light- to heavy-duty, in 68 variants on 12 wheelbase lengths (Canada)

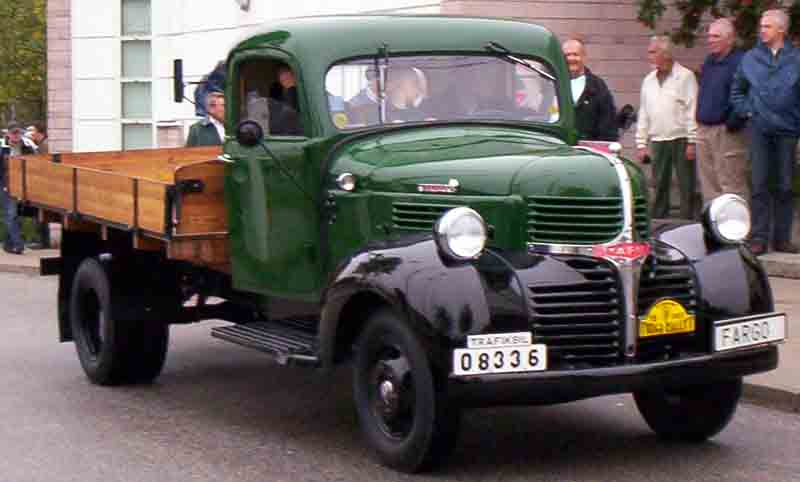
1946 Fargo FK2-33 badged version of the Dodge T-, V-, W-Series

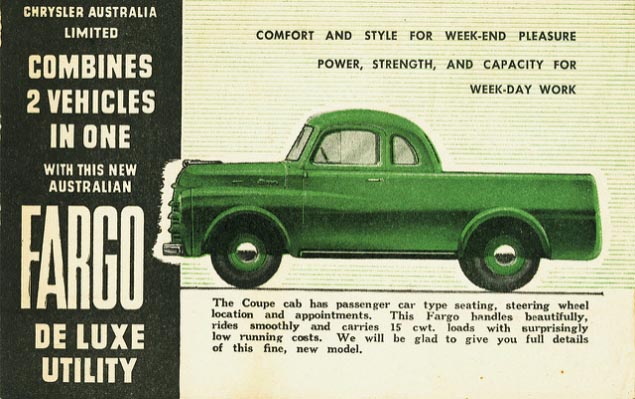
Australian Fargo De Luxe Utility

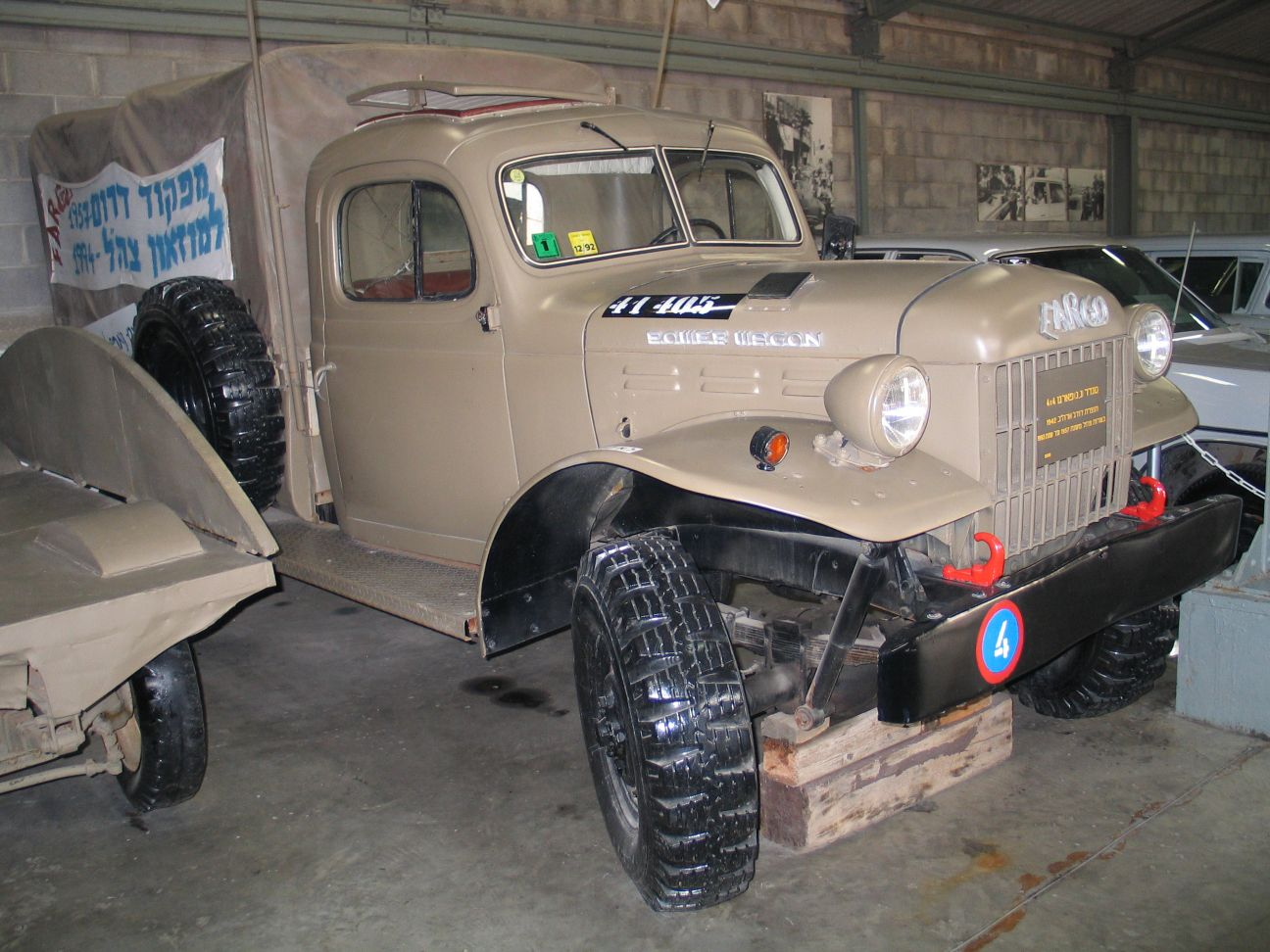
Fargo Power Wagon truck in Batey ha-Osef Museum, Israel

The first Fargo trucks were built in Pilsen, Chicago, by the Fargo Motor Car Company from 1913 until 1922. In 1928, Chrysler bought the business and created their own line of Fargo trucks. Shortly after its creation, Chrysler also bought the Dodge Brothers Company, adding Dodge- and Graham Brothers-badged trucks to its product line. From then on, Fargo trucks were almost identical to Dodge models, save for trim and name, and were sold by Chrysler-Plymouth dealers.

U.S. sales of Fargo trucks were discontinued in the 1930s and replaced in the US by Plymouth-badged trucks in 1937, In Canada, the name Fargo was used until 1972 for marketing reasons to differentiate the trucks as Chrysler-Plymouth dealer offerings apart from the Dodge trucks sold at Dodge dealers. Fargo trucks were sold worldwide. In 1953, 194 new trucks were registered in Morocco. The total number of Fargo trucks in Morocco in 1953 was 1422.

In 1935, a new designation for vehicles began. The FC3 was the first vehicle with the new name. The F stood for Fargo, the C for the year 1935, and the 3 for the size of the vehicle. The following year was designated with the letter D for 1936.

Listing of Fargo trucks:

- KF32 before new designation (1935)
- FC3 (1935)
- FC4 (1935)
- FD1 (1936)
- FD3 (1936)
- FD4 (1936)
- FE1 (1937) Six-cylinder engine with 3574 cc. Bore 85.73 mm, Stroke 103.2 mm. 75 HP at 3000 RPM.
- FE2 (1937) Six-cylinder engine with 3574 cc. Bore 85.73 mm, Stroke 103.2 mm. 75 HP at 3000 RPM.
- FE3 (1937) Six-cylinder engine with 3574 cc. Bore 85.73 mm, Stroke 103.2 mm. 75 HP at 3000 RPM.
- FE4 (1937) Six-cylinder engine with 3740 cc. Bore 85.75 mm, Stroke 107,95 mm. 78 HP at 3000 RPM.
- FE6 (1937) Six-cylinder engine with 3959 cc. Bore 85.73 mm, Stroke 114,3 mm. 85 HP at 3000 RPM.
- FG1 (1938)
- FG2 (1938)
- FGZ6 (1938)
- FH2 (1939)
- FH3 (1939)
- FH4 (1939)
- FHD4 (1939)
- FL4 (1946-1947)

=== Chrysler's badge engineering ===
The Fargo brand lived longer in a variety of countries under the Chrysler Corporation's badge engineering marketing approach.

Manufactured in Detroit at the Lynch Road facility, Dodge trucks were also offered under the Fargo (or DeSoto) names in most of Latin America, while in Europe and Asia, they were mainly built in Chrysler's Kew (UK) plant and sold under either the Fargo or DeSoto badge names.

In Argentina, the make Fargo was used for the pickup D-100 and the D-400, and DP-400 diesel truck from 1960 to 1967.

In Australia, both American and British Dodge models, along with locally assembled units, were marketed by Chrysler Australia with Dodge, Fargo, or De Soto badges.

Additionally, heavy trucks made in Spain by Barreiros, Chrysler's Spanish subsidiary, including a 38-tonne tractor and rigid four-, six- and eight-wheelers, which were sold in the UK as the Dodge 300 Series, were exported to several countries as Fargo vehicles.

The use of the Fargo trademark came to an end in the US when Dodge pulled out of the American heavy truck business in 1976, and finally in 1978, when Chrysler Europe was sold to PSA Peugeot Citroën.

=== In Turkey ===
The Fargo brand existed in Turkey for years, and well into the 21st century because Fargo and De Soto light and heavy trucks were made by Turkish manufacturer Askam, with no technical or business connection with Chrysler in its final years. However, Askam was the descendant of Chrysler Kamyon Montaj Fabrikası, founded in Istanbul in 1964, with Chrysler holding a majority interest. Askam went out of business in 2015, meaning that the LDV Maxus van was the last Fargo-badged (as the "Fargo Fora") vehicle offered in the world.

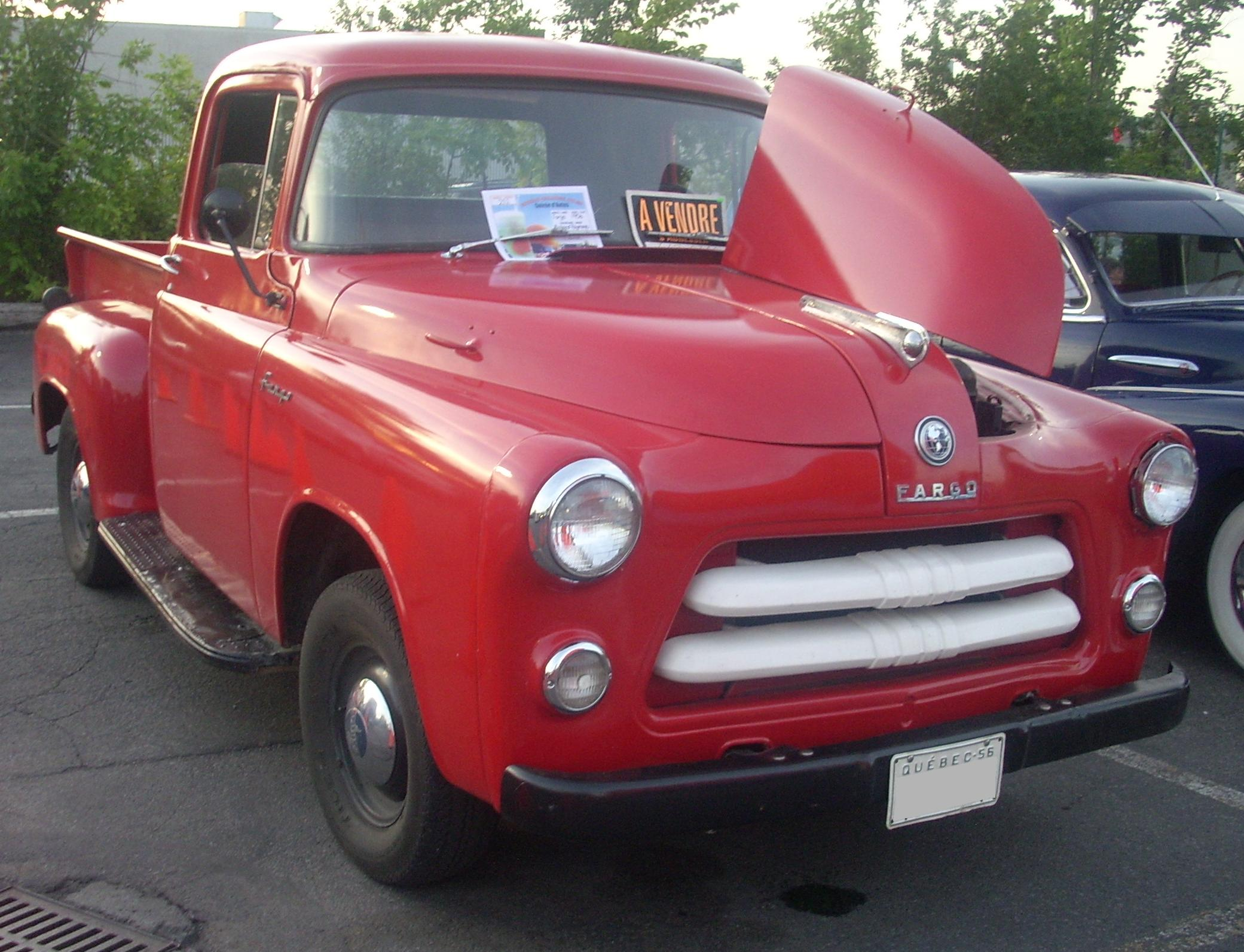
A 1956 Fargo pickup

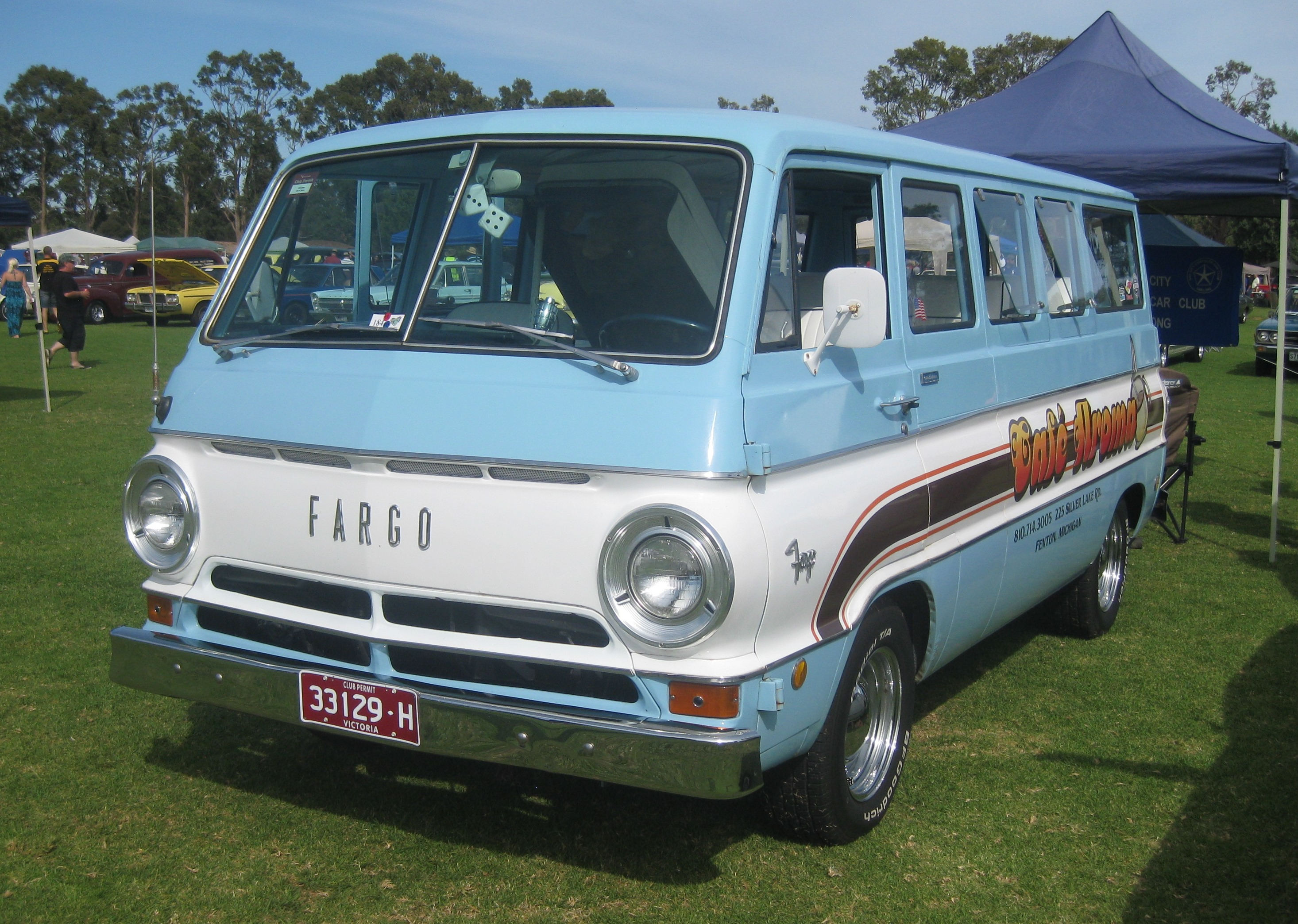
Fargo-badged version of the Dodge A100 van

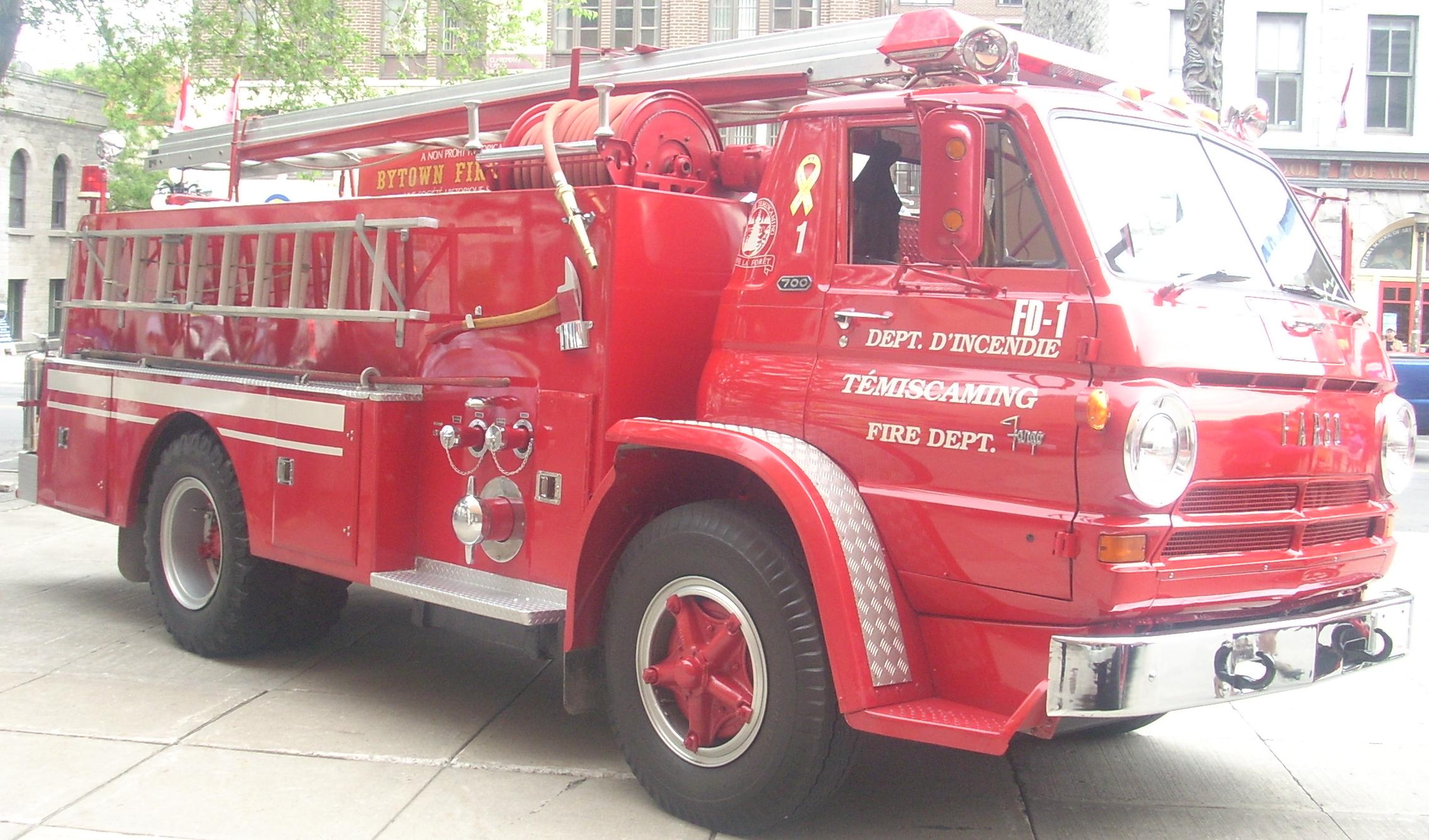
Fargo pumper fire truck from Témiscaming, Quebec

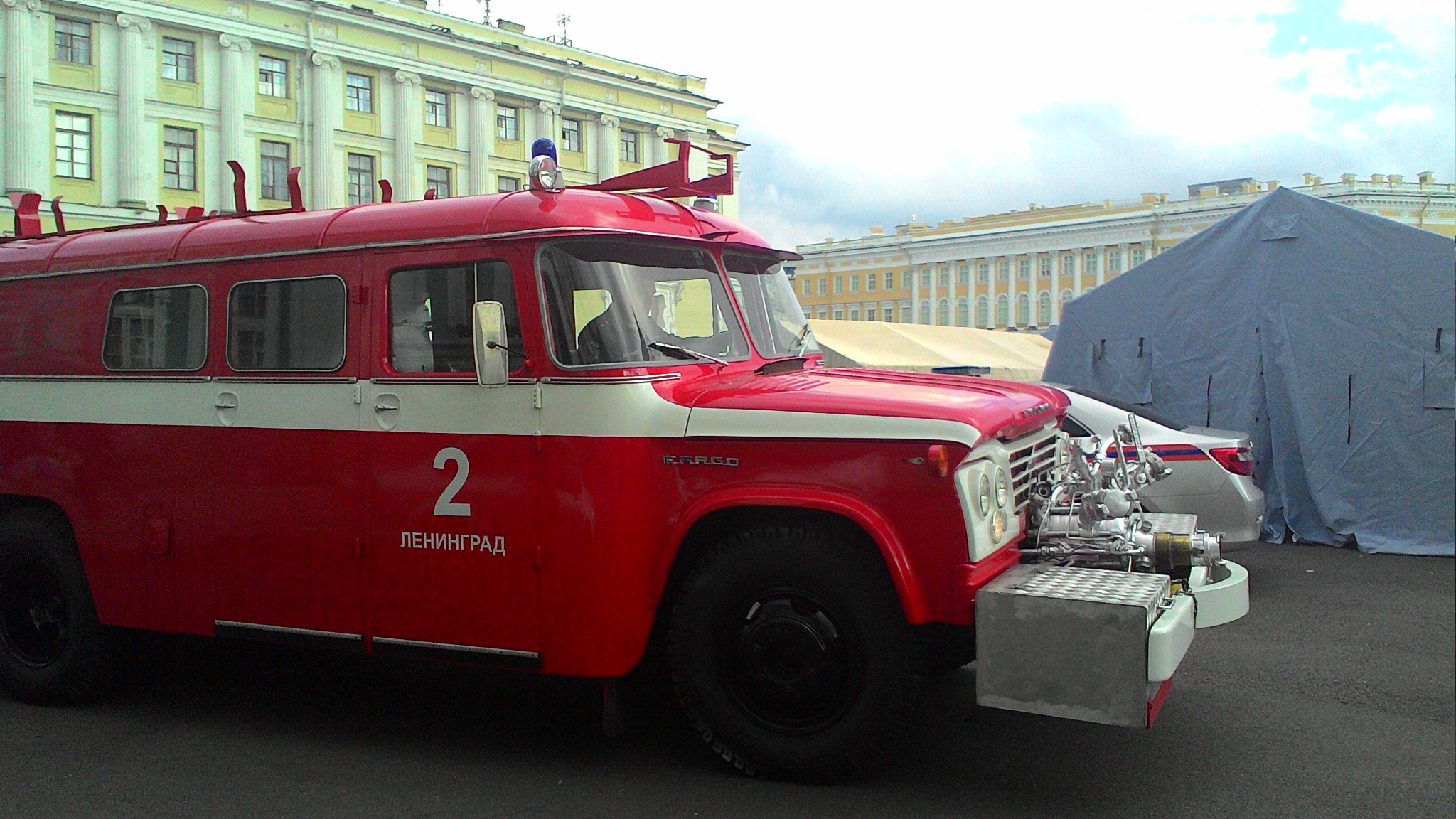
Fargo fire truck in Saint Petersburg, Russia

== See also ==
- Dodge A100, which was marketed in Canada as a Fargo
- DeSoto (automobile)#Trucks, a rebadging of the Fargo trucks
- Dodge Ram
