= Barreiros (manufacturer) =

Former Spanish automobile company

Barreiros Diesel, S.A.

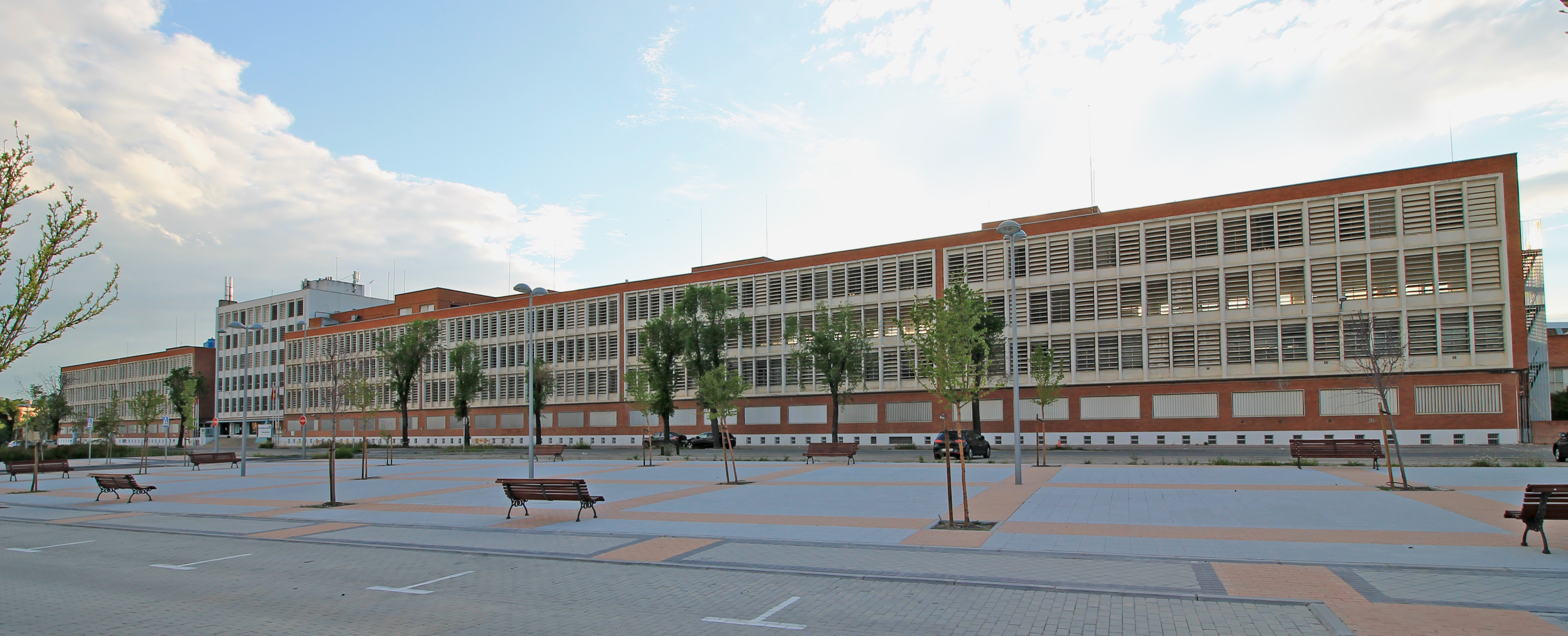
- Barreiros Diesel headquarters in Madrid
- Type: Private (1954–1969); Subsidiary (1969–1978)
- Industry: Automotive industry
- Founded: 1954
- Founder: Eduardo Barreiros
- Defunct: 1978; 48 years ago
- Fate: Acquired by Chrysler in 1969, folded with them in 1978.
- Successor: Chrysler España, S.A.
- Products: Automobiles, trucks, buses, engines
- Parent: Chrysler Europe (1969–1978)

Barreiros was a Spanish manufacturer of engines, trucks, buses and automobiles. It was a Chrysler Europe subsidiary from 1969 to 1978.

== History ==
The company was founded in 1954 as "Barreiros Diesel S.A." by Eduardo Barreiros and based in Madrid. Established initially as a producer of diesel engines, at Ourense the company then expanded to make commercial vehicles, reaching licensing agreements with French Berliet (truck cabs), British AEC (buses and coaches), German Hanomag (agricultural tractors), and Vidal & Sohn Tempo-Werke GmbH (light vans and trucks), all of them driven by Barreiros's own engines. Additionally a pay-in-kind contract with Polish Star was active in the late 1950s, by which engineless Star chassis-cab trucks were exported to Spain, while Barreiros engines were sent to Poland; the whole resulted in Barreiros-engined Star tractors being sold in China (and Polish trucks in Spain).

Later on Barreiros branched out into the production of passenger cars by means of cooperation (and capital links) with the Chrysler Corporation. An agreement was reached with Chrysler in 1963 to build the Dodge Dart, allowing the company to enter the car market. Sold as the Barreiros Dart, it had modified front styling, a four-speed gearbox, and all-around disc brakes. During that time, the Spanish automobile market was strongly protected, making entering it effectively only possible by domestic manufacturing. As the 1960s progressed, the range was extended with some smaller models from Chrysler's French subsidiary, Simca. The Barreiros-made Simca 1000 was launched in 1966, and later the Simca 1200 joined the range (in fact the French Simca 1100, but with a bigger standard engine for the Spanish market).

== The Spanish Dodges ==
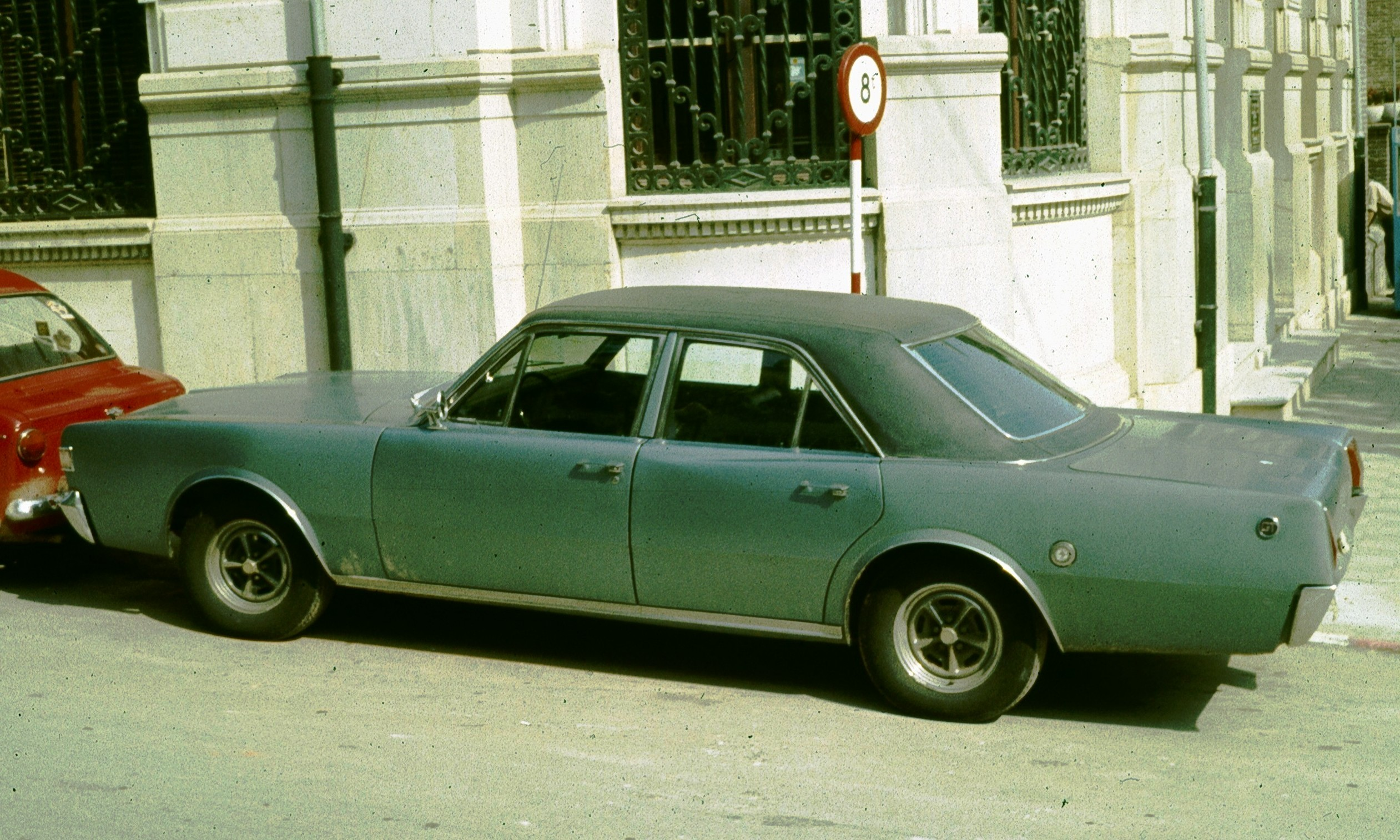
Dart-based Dodge 3700

From 1965 to 1970, a Spanish version of the Dodge Dart based on the original from the United States was manufactured in the Barreiros Villaverde factory in Madrid, using the same 111-in (2,819 mm) wheelbase, but with different sheet metal; the Dodge 3700 (commonly known as the Dart) was produced from 1971 to 1978. A total of 17,589 units were manufactured of both models in Spain, they were produced as a knock-down kit imported from Argentina due to the protectionist Spanish regulations of those years.

The Dart and the 3700 were the largest national production cars available in Spain during all production years. It was an expensive luxury car with very low fuel economy by Spanish standards. The GL designation was a luxury model, while the GT was the sportier version.

All gasoline Dodges had the biggest engine ever mounted into a mass-production car in Spain, the 225 cu in (3.7 L) Chrysler Slant 6 engine. The "3700" number is a reference to the 3.7 litres of displacement. No other six-cylinder engine car has been produced in numbers as numerous in Spain. A diesel Dart (named "Barreiros Diesel") was also produced. These models were very basic and very slow, and used the round tail lights from the first-generation Simca 1000.

A station wagon version, as well as other variants (diplomatic motorcade cars, ambulances, hearses, etc.) were produced.

Production of the Spanish Dodge Dart/Dodge 3700 stopped in 1977. Peugeot bought the Villaverde factory, as Chrysler was divesting European operations in Spain, France, and the United Kingdom.

Spanish Dodges were popular with members of the Franco government during the 1960s and 1970s. Admiral Luis Carrero Blanco was killed on 20 December 1973 while travelling in his Dodge 3700 GT. On 12 June 1975, Fernando Herrero Tejedor, a Minister Secretary General of the Movimiento Nacional and the politician mentoring Adolfo Suárez, died in a car accident while travelling in his official Dodge 3700 in the municipality of Adanero.

== Barreiros Imperial limousines ==
After the last ten Ghia-built Crown Imperial limousines were completed for Chrysler, Ghia sold its tooling to Barreiros. Barreiros built ten limousines, much like those built by Ghia, and similar to the last ten built by Ghia, built as 1965 models with 1966 exterior styling.

== Chrysler subsidiary ==
In 1969, Chrysler Europe took complete control of the company.

In 1975, Barreiros became for the first time the sole source for a Chrysler Europe model when the production lines of the slow-selling Chrysler 180 series were moved to Madrid from Simca's factory in Poissy. Unlike in most other European countries, the Chrysler 180 became relatively popular in Spain. Barreiros also continued to assemble other Chrysler Europe models for the domestic market, including Simca 1307 (renamed Chrysler 150 in Spain to be more in line with the popular 180) and Simca Horizon.

On the truck and bus side, a full range of light, medium and heavy models was offered, still marketed as Barreiros in Spain and as Dodge or Fargo elsewhere, but eventually the Dodge badge prevailed in all markets.

== In PSA and Renault hands ==
In 1978, Chrysler Europe was sold to PSA, which subsequently renamed all former Chrysler/Simca models Talbot (so, for example, the Chrysler 150 became Talbot 150). Barreiros continued to assemble Talbot car models launched under the PSA reign, such as Talbot Solara or Talbot Samba.

The truck and bus division was sold to Renault, also called RVI, and for a short time, the former original Barreiros models, mostly of them trucks, were sold badged as Renaults / Spanish Renault. The Barreiros Diesel SA motorvehicle factory at Villaverde in Madrid is now owned by the huge "Renault Trucks (Espana) SA" company where modern Renault trucks and heavy vehicles are produced.

== Notoriety ==
Spanish Prime Minister Admiral Luis Carrero Blanco, who served under Generalísimo Francisco Franco, was assassinated in 1973 while riding in an armoured Dodge 3700 GT by an 80 kg bomb planted by the Basque separatist group ETA. The car, whose armoured structure resisted the 80 kg dynamite bomb, was blown over the roof of a building, landing in the building's inner courtyard. Carrero Blanco and his driver died. The car is now on display at the Army Museum of Toledo.

== Barreiros trucks ==
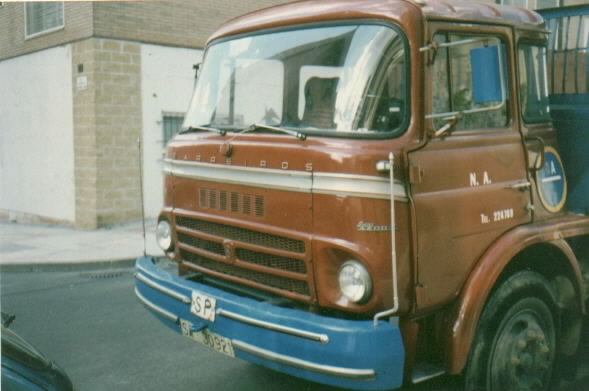
Barreiros Super Azor

(1957–81)

- Star 4x2
- Puma 4x2
- Condor 4x2
- Halcon 4x2
- Azor 4x2
- Saeta 4x2
- Super Saeta 4x2
- Super Azor 4x2
- TT90 Militar 4x4
- Comando Militar 4x4
- Gran Ruta 6x4
- Víctor 6x4
- Centauro 6x4
- Panter Militar 6x6
- Dumper 6x6
- Montblanc 8x4

== Simca cars ==
- Simca 1000/900/1000 Rallye
- Simca 1200 LS
- Simca 1200 GL
- Simca 1200 GL Special
- Simca 1200 GLS (90 octanos)
- Simca 1200 GL Special
- Simca 1200 LX-TI
- Simca 1200 Campero

== Dodge cars ==
- Dodge Dart (1965–70)
- Dodge 3700 (1971–77)

== Imperial cars ==
- Imperial limousine (1966)

== Barreiros tractors ==
(1961–80)

- R335S
- R350
- R350S
- R438
- R438 Especial
- R440
- R500 Labramatic
- R545
- R545 I
- R545 IA
- 4000
- 4000V
- 5000
- 5000 VL/VR
- 5500
- 7000
- 40/45
- 50/55
- 70/70
- 90/90 (prototype)
