= Hillman Avenger =

Small family car (1970-1981)

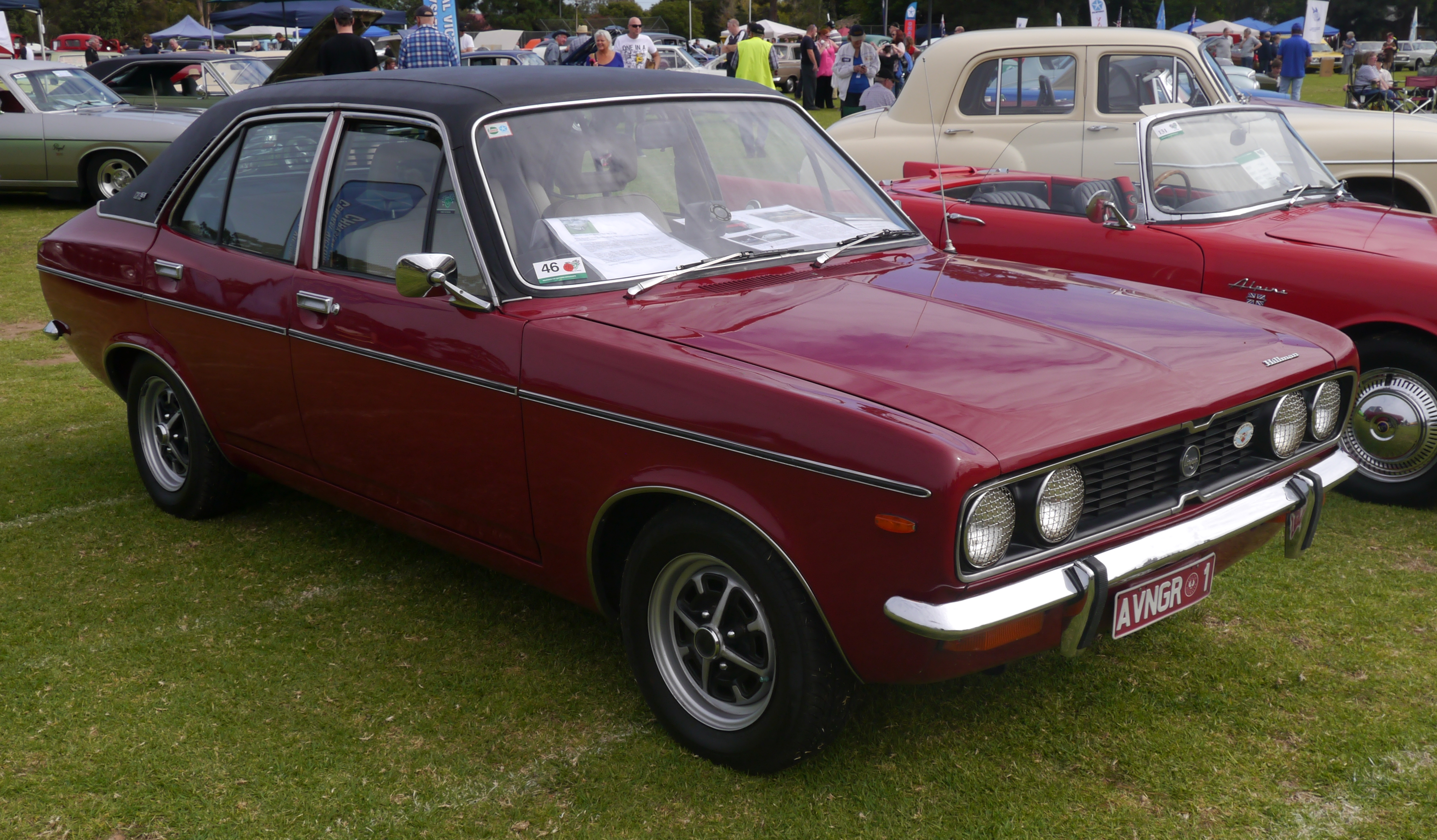
- Hillman Avenger 1600 GLS

Overview
- Manufacturer: Chrysler Europe (1970–1979); PSA Peugeot Citroën (1979–1981)
- Also called: Chrysler Avenger; Chrysler Sunbeam (Europe); Talbot Avenger; Sunbeam Avenger (Europe); Dodge Avenger (South Africa); Plymouth Cricket (North America); Dodge 1800 (Brazil); Dodge Polara (Brazil and Colombia); Dodge 1500 Pickup (Uruguay); Dodge 1500 (Argentina and Colombia); Volkswagen 1500 (Argentina); Sunbeam 1300; Sunbeam 1600
- Production: 1970–1981; 1973–1981 (Brazil); 1971–1990 (Argentina)
- Assembly: England: Ryton-on-Dunsmore; Scotland: Linwood; Brazil: São Bernardo do Campo; Iran: Tehran (Iran Khodro); Colombia: Bogotá (GM Colmotores); Argentina: Buenos Aires (Chrysler Argentina); New Zealand: Wellington
- Designer: Tim Fry, Roy Axe

Body and chassis
- Class: Small family car (C)
- Body style: 4-door saloon 5-door estate from 1972; 2-door saloon from 1973
- Layout: Front-engine, rear-wheel drive
- Related: Chrysler Sunbeam

Powertrain
- Engine: 1,248 cc I4 (1970–1973); 1,295 cc I4 (1973–1981); 1,498 cc I4; 1,598 cc I4 (1973–1981); 1,618 cc Peugeot XC6 I4 (South Africa); 1,798 cc I4 (South America)
- Transmission: 4-speed manual 3-speed automatic 4-speed automatic (1974)

Dimensions
- Wheelbase: 98 in (2,489 mm)
- Length: 161 in (4,089 mm)
- Width: 62 in (1,575 mm)
- Height: 53 in (1,346 mm)

Chronology
- Predecessor: Hillman Minx
- Successor: Chrysler Horizon

The Hillman Avenger is a small family car, originally engineered and manufactured by the Rootes Group in the UK and marketed globally from 1970 to 1978. It is a five-passenger car with two- or four-door saloon and five-door estate body styles and a front-engine, rear-wheel-drive layout.

As a completely new design, the Avenger was a conventional, straightforward and economical design – the saloon distinguished by its four-doors, chair-height seating, four-link coil rear suspension and unique, J-shaped or "hockey stick" taillights.

The project was conceived in 1963; Design Director Roy Axe received his styling brief in 1965; and engineering began in 1966. The Avenger became one of the first automobiles to use computer-aided design (CAD) in the engineering of its unibody, and it was one of the first cars to address growing safety requirements, featuring a rigid passenger compartment with a front crumple zone, strengthened windscreen glass, and heavily padded instrument panel.

After its press introduction in Malta in early 1970, manufacturing took place at the Rootes plant in Ryton-on-Dunsmore, England, near Coventry which had been renovated at a cost of £8M (£154M 2025) — with bodies and body panels shipped by train from Linwood, Scotland, and powertrains shipped from Stoke. Manufacturing moved completely to Linwood in 1976.

Rootes marketed the Avenger from 1970 to 1975 solely under its Hillman brand, as the Hillman Avenger. After Rootes became a division of Chrysler Europe, the car was marketed from 1976 to 1978 as the Chrysler Avenger. After the sale of Chrysler Europe to PSA Peugeot Citroën it was marketed from 1979 to 1981 as the Talbot Avenger.

The Avenger would ultimately spawn a host of global badge engineered variants, including prominently a North American variant marketed from 1971 to 1973, the Plymouth Cricket; by Chrysler Brazil for 1971–1980 as the Dodge 1800 (notably in a two-door body style) and later as the Dodge Polara — by Volkswagen Argentina as the VW 1800.

Despite its conventional underpinnings, the Avenger was successful in motorsport, winning the 1971 Press-on-Regardless Rally (in Plymouth Cricket badging); winning the British Group 1 Rally Championship in 1975 and 1976 in Northern Ireland, winning the British Saloon Car Championship numerous times, and winning the 1976 Heatway Rally of New Zealand.

At its introduction, the Avenger's success was considered crucial to Rootes, and by the time UK production finished in 1981, some 790,000 examples had rolled off the Ryton and Linwood production lines. While the Avenger was one of the most popular British cars of the 1970s, by 2016, reportedly fewer than 260 remained in use in Britain.

== 1970: Hillman Avenger ==
Introduced in February 1970, the Avenger was significant as it was the first and last car to be developed by Rootes after the Chrysler takeover in 1967. Its styling used conventional three-box and two-box styling featuring an American-influenced "Coke Bottle" waistline and semi-fastback rear-end, later spawning a station wagon variant.

The Avenger used conventional unibody construction and a 4-cylinder all-iron overhead valve engine in 1250 or 1500 capacities driving a coil spring suspended live axle at the rear wheels. The Avenger was praised by the press for its handling characteristics and overall road competence.

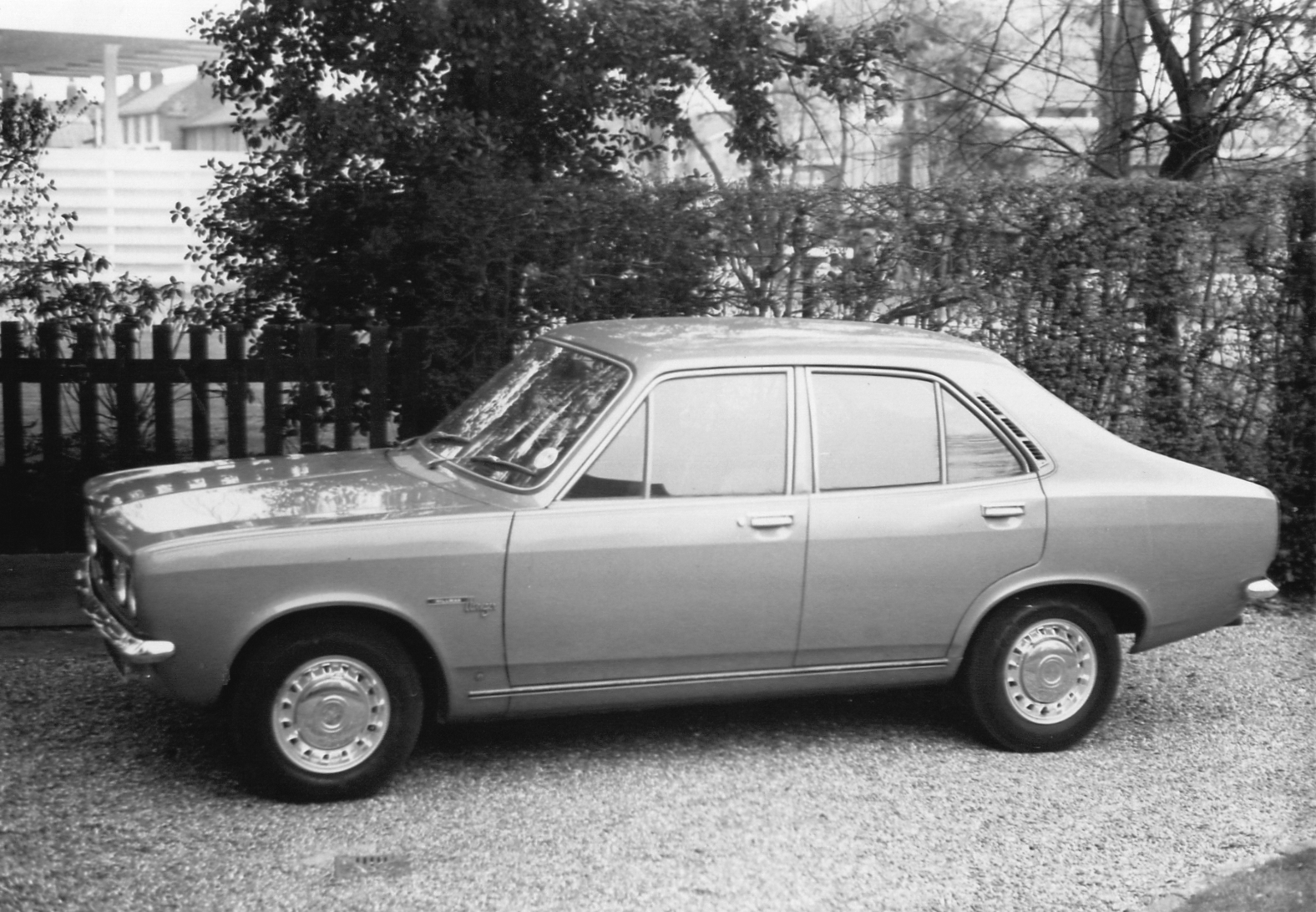
A 1971 photograph of a 1970 Hillman Avenger GL

Initially, the Avenger was available as a four-door saloon in DL or Super trim levels with either the 1250 or 1500 cc engines, as well as a GL trim level with the 1500 cc engine. The DL featured rubber mat floor covering and a simple dashboard with a strip-style speedometer. The Super also featured carpets, armrests, twin horns reversing lights and dashboard carried from the DL. The GL trim featured four round headlights, internal bonnet release, two-speed wipers, brushed nylon seat trim (never previously used on British cars), reclining front seats, and round instruments in its dash along with extra instrumentation. During the first two years of production, only the car's curb side featured the Avenger emblem, as a cost saving measure.

In addition to its styling, its engine and transmission were purpose-designed exclusive to the Avenger. Its plastic front grille, a first in Britain and at 4 ft 6 in (137 cm) wide was claimed as the largest mass-produced plastic component used at the time by a European car. The Avenger was a steady seller in the 1970s, in competition with the Ford Escort and Vauxhall Viva. Chrysler marketed the Avenger globally, prominently but unsuccessfully as the Plymouth Cricket in the U.S..

=== Body and trim variations ===
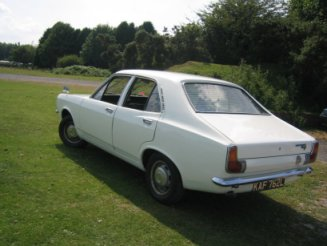
1972 Hillman Avenger Saloon (sedan)

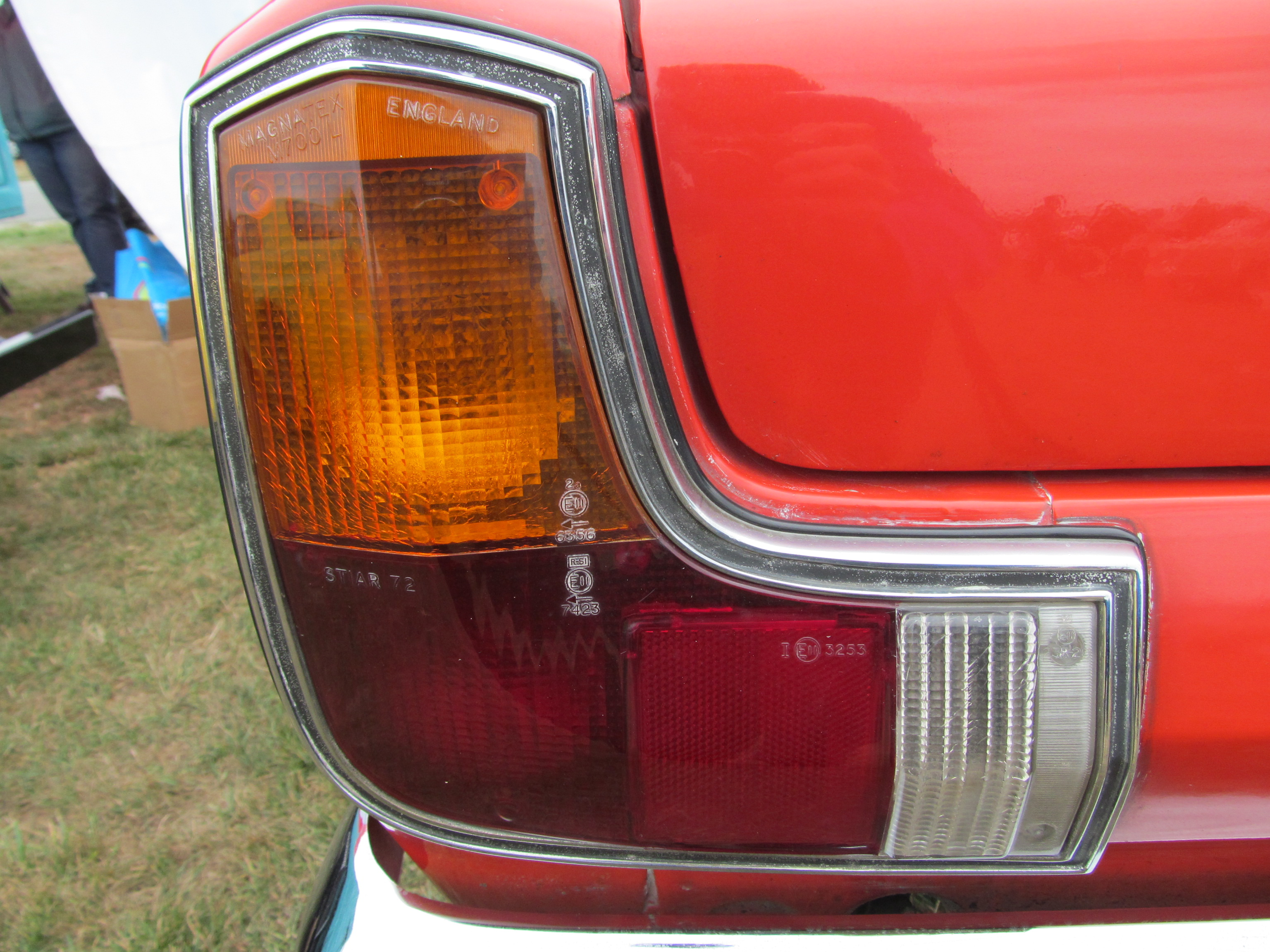
Close up of the Avenger's unique "hockey stick" taillights

In October 1970, the Avenger GT was added to the range featuring a twin-carburettor 1500 cc engine, four-speed manual or three-speed automatic transmission (also optional on the 1500 DL, Super and GL). The GT featured twin round headlights, door stripes and "dustbin lid" wheel covers, similar to on various 1970s Datsuns and Toyotas.

A basic fleet Avenger was added to the range in February 1972 with either 1250 or 1500 cc engines (the latter available with the automatic transmission option), while the interior featured a driver sun visor and a single speed heater blower. In October 1972, the Avenger GT was replaced by the Avenger GLS, featuring a vinyl roof and Rostyle sports wheels.

In March 1972, the five-door estate versions were introduced, in DL and Super trim levels, both available with either 1250 or 1500 cc engines and using the same specifications as the saloon. The estate featured 'heavy-duty springing' with a maximum load capacity of 1,040 lb (470 kg), compared to 840 lb (380 kg) for the saloon.

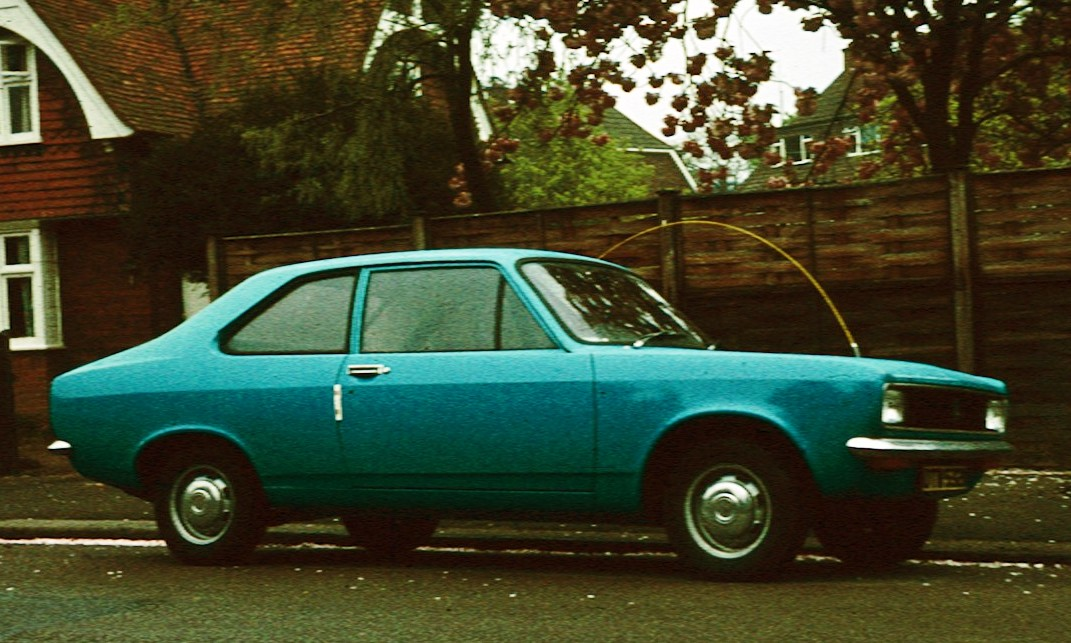
Hillman Avenger Saloon: a two-door version was offered from 1973. The absence of wrap-around turn indicators on the front corners identifies this as a pre-facelift Avenger.

A two-door saloon model was added in March 1973, with all engine and trim levels of the four-door range.

The car was extensively marketed in continental Europe, first as a Sunbeam and as the Sunbeam 1250 and 1500 in France, later the 1300 and 1600. Some Northern European markets marketed the car as the Sunbeam Avenger.

Both engine sizes were upgraded in October 1973. The 1250 became the 1300, while the 1500 became the 1600 with nearly all the same previous trim levels except for the basic fleet Avenger, which was discontinued at this point. The three speed automatic transmission was upgraded to four speeds with the Borg Warner 45 transmission replacing the earlier 35. The GL and GT trim levels were offered with the 1300 engine and two-door saloon body.

== 1972: Hillman Avenger Tiger ==
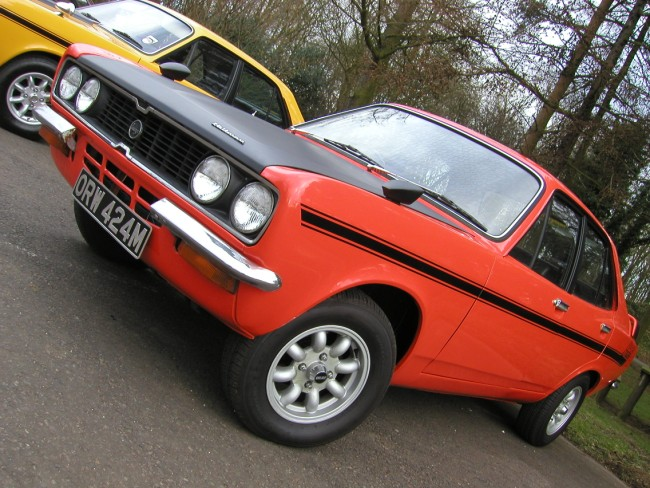
Hillman Avenger Tiger Mk2

Named to evoke memories of the Sunbeam Tiger, the Avenger Tiger concept began as a publicity exercise. Avenger Super (four-door) cars were modified by the Chrysler Competitions Centre under Des O'Dell and the Tiger model was launched in March 1972. Modifications included the 1500 GT engine with an improved cylinder head with enlarged valves, twin Weber carburetors and a compression ratio of 9.4:1. The engine now developed 92.5 bhp (69 kW) at 6,100 rpm. The suspension was also uprated, whilst brakes, rear axle, and gearbox are directly from the GT.

A distinctive yellow colour scheme ("Sundance") with a bonnet bulge, rear spoiler and side stripes was standard, set off with "Avenger Tiger" lettering on the rear quarters.

Road test figures demonstrated a 0–60 mph (97 km/h) time of 8.9 seconds and a top speed of 108 mph (174 km/h). These figures beat the rival Ford Escort Mexico, but fuel consumption was heavy. Even in 1972, the Tiger developed a reputation for its thirst.

All Avenger Tigers were assembled by the Chrysler Competitions Centre and production figures are vague but around 200 of the initial Mark 1 seems likely.

In October 1972, Chrysler unveiled the more production ready Mark 2 Tiger. The Avenger GL bodyshell with four round headlights was used. Mechanically identical to the earlier cars (from contemporary road tests, however, there were better performances and fuel consumption), the bonnet bulge was lost although the bonnet turned matt black, and there were changes to wheels and seats. These cars went on sale at £1,350. Production was around 400. Red ("Wardance") was now available as well as yellow ("Sundance"), both with black detailing.

== 1976–1979: Chrysler Avenger ==
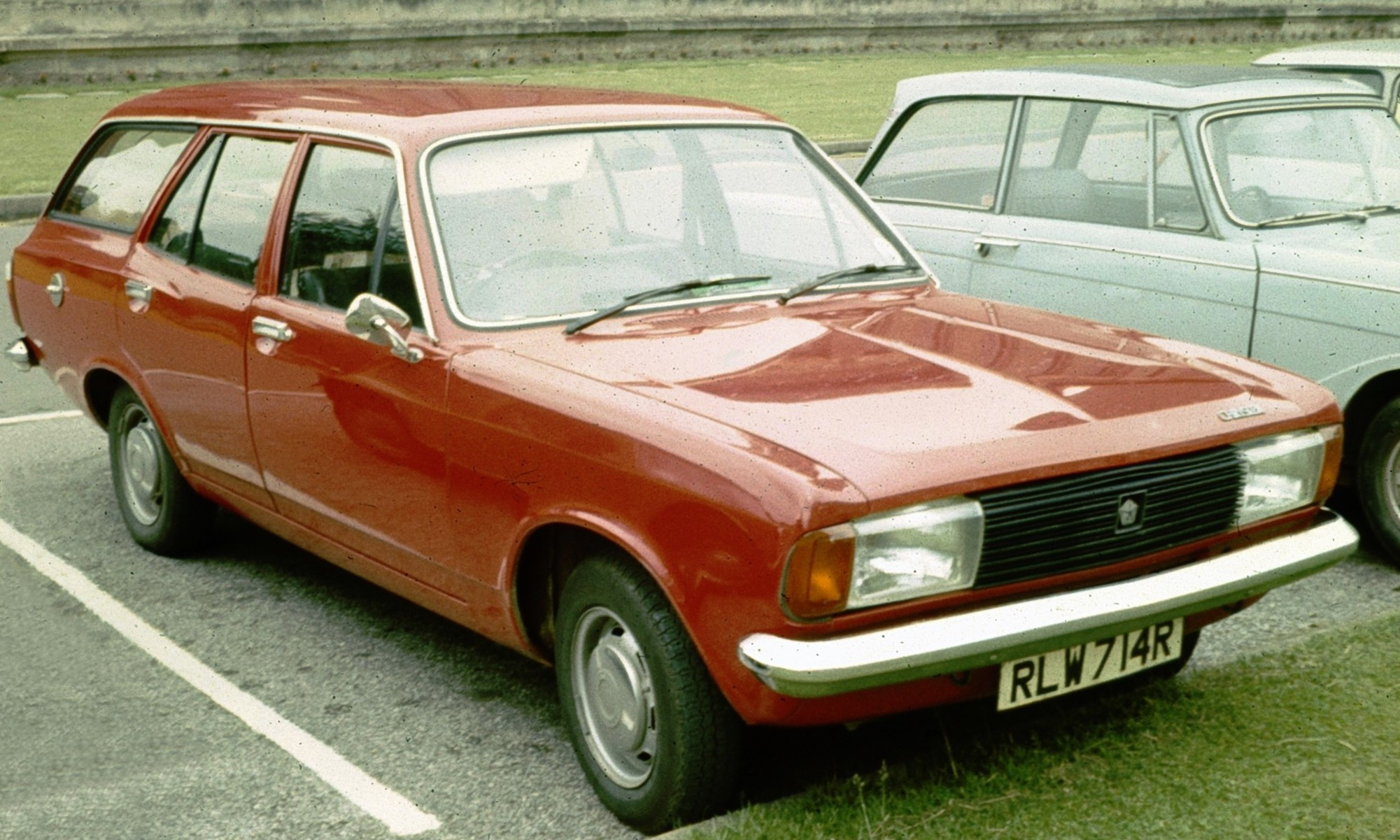
1977 Chrysler Avenger Estate

In September 1976, the Avenger was rebadged as a Chrysler. It also gained a comprehensive facelift which included a new frontal treatment and a new dashboard. Both treatments looked similar to those of the Chrysler Alpine. The greatest change was at the rear where, on the saloons, the distinctive "hockey-stick" rear lamp clusters were dropped in favour of a straight "light-bar" arrangement. To save the cost of retooling the entire rear wings/fenders, the top of the former light apertures simply had body coloured metal plates attached in their place, whilst the fuel cap was moved from the rear to the right hand side of the car.

Three trim levels were available, LS, GL (known as 'Super' in certain markets) and GLS, the latter being only available in a high-compression 1.6 L form.

From the beginning of production in 1970, the Avenger's bodyshell components had been manufactured at Linwood, and then transported south to Ryton on the component trains used to move materials for the Hillman Imp north to Linwood. Following the Imp's discontinuation in 1976, the Avenger production line was moved from Ryton to Linwood where it was produced until the end of its UK production life., whilst Ryton was switched over to producing the Simca-based Chrysler Alpine and later the Talbot Solara.

== 1977: Chrysler Sunbeam hatchback ==
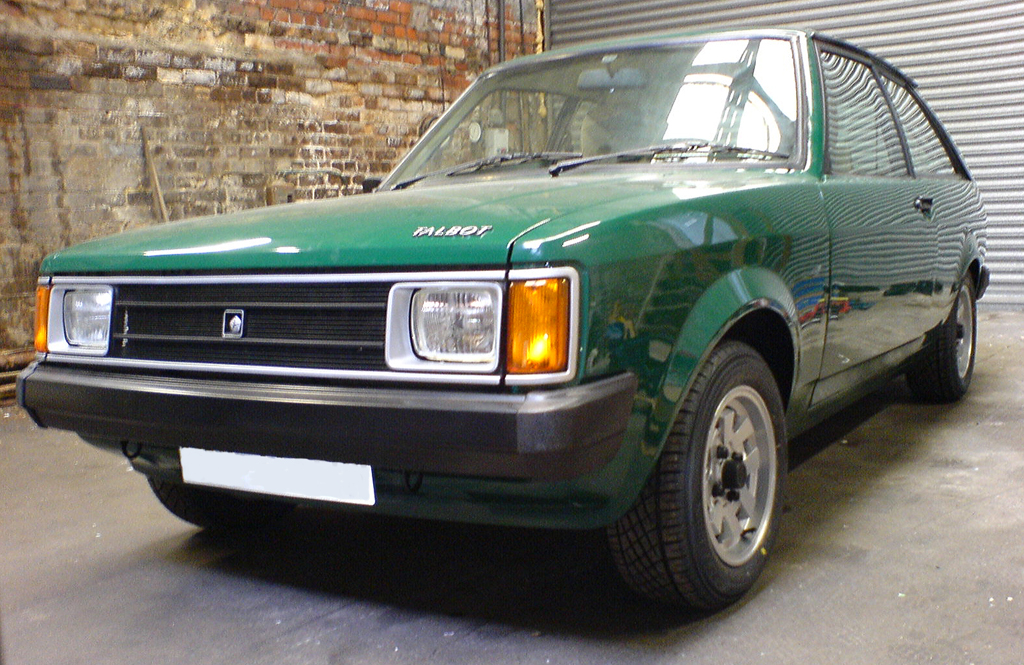
Series 1 Talbot Sunbeam Lotus in an unusual colour scheme; this example started life as an undercover model for Greater Manchester Police. Photo courtesy of Steve Conry, Avenger & Sunbeam Owners Club.

In 1977, a hatchback variant was introduced, known as the Chrysler Sunbeam. This was based on a shortened version of the Avenger's floorplan, and was intended to compete in the lower "supermini" class. It also shared doors with the 2-door Avenger. Initially three engines were available: a 928 cc Hillman Imp-derived unit and 1300 and 1600 Avenger units. A sporty "Ti" version was soon introduced, also with a 1600 engine.

The model's name was a revival of the Rootes Sunbeam marque, which had recently been killed off along with the final Sunbeam model, the Rapier.

In 1979, Chrysler unveiled the Sunbeam Lotus at the Geneva Motor Show. Developed in conjunction with Lotus with rallying in mind (because none of the existing models were competitive) and using a 2200 cc Lotus engine, the road-going version of the rally car was not actually ready for delivery to the public until after the Peugeot buyout, and thus became the Talbot Sunbeam Lotus. At first, these were produced mostly in Lotus' then tobacco-sponsorship colours of black and silver, although later models came in a turquoise and silver scheme.

== 1979–1981: Talbot Avenger ==
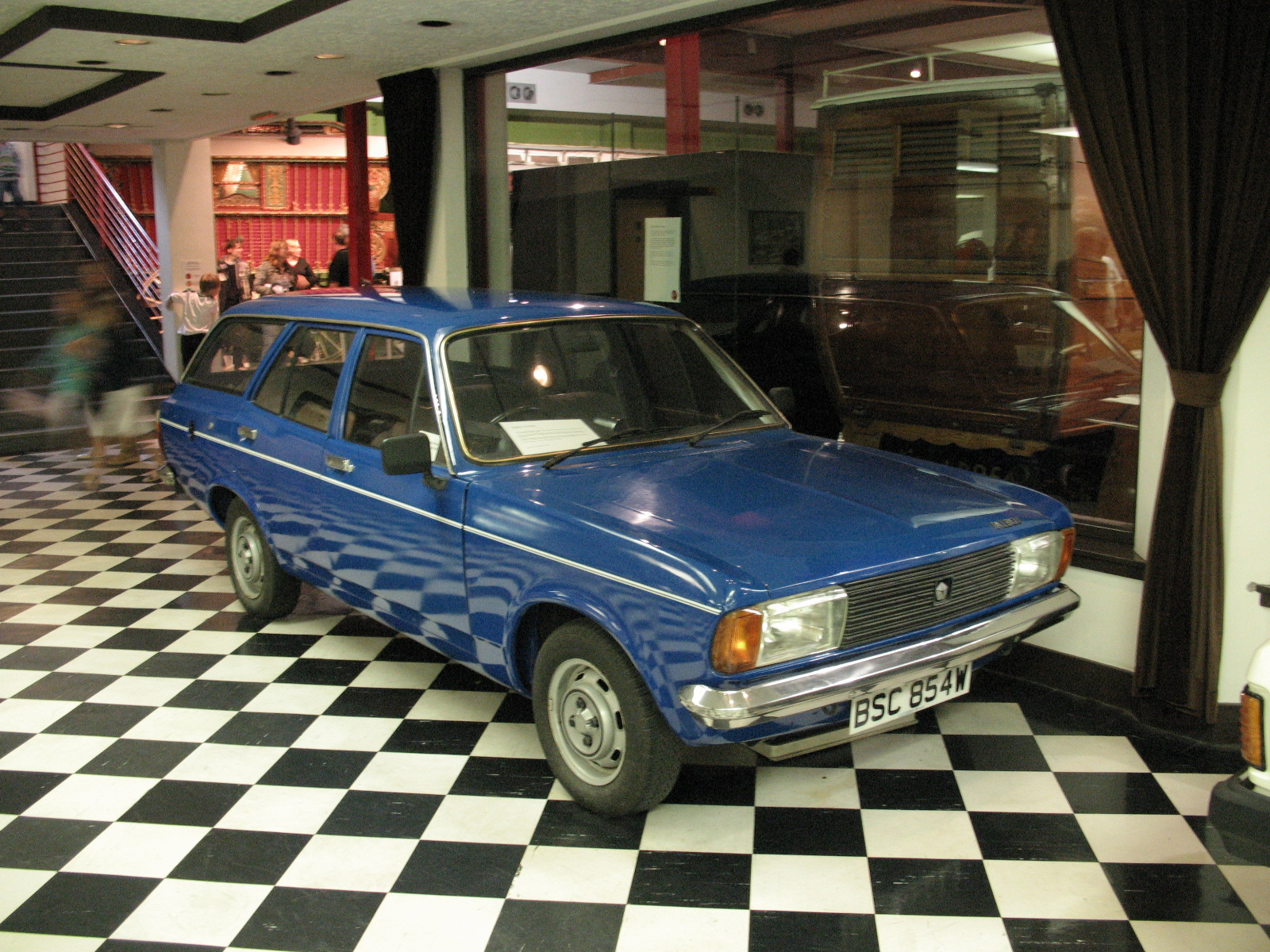
1981 Talbot Avenger Estate

Following the collapse of Chrysler Europe in 1978, and its takeover by PSA Peugeot Citroën, the Avenger was rebadged with the resurrected Talbot brand with the Avenger remaining in production alongside the hatchback-only Horizon to meet the demand which remained for traditional saloons and estates in this sector. Unlike newer Talbot models such as the Horizon, the Avenger retained the Chrysler "Pentastar" badge, instead of the Talbot logo featuring a letter "T" inside a circle – this was because Chrysler had retained the rights to the Avenger model after the sale of Chrysler Europe to PSA, who only had purchased the rights to the Simca-based Alpine and Horizon. The Sunbeam was afforded a minor facelift in Autumn 1980 with revised headlights and grille now featuring the round Talbot logo. Production continued until the middle of 1981, when PSA closed the Linwood production plant and concentrated all British production at the Ryton plant. The Avenger was discontinued with no direct replacement – the Peugeot 305, introduced in 1977, was the closest car to the Avenger's size in PSA's lineup; although the slightly larger Talbot Solara (a saloon version of the Alpine/Simca 1307) had been introduced shortly before the Avenger's demise.

Chrysler retained ownership of the "Avenger" trademark, subsequently used on the Dodge Avenger 2007–2014. The name was also used on Jeep's first electric model to be marketed in Australia in 2024.

== International markets ==
Internationally, the Avenger was marketed and sometimes assembled by the various branches of Chrysler's global operations In the United States it was marketed as a Plymouth. In South Africa, as with the larger Hunter assembled there, the Avenger used Peugeot engines and was badged as a Dodge rather than a Hillman. In New Zealand, the car, assembled from CKD kits, was available initially in 4-door and, later, 5-door estate forms.

=== United States ===
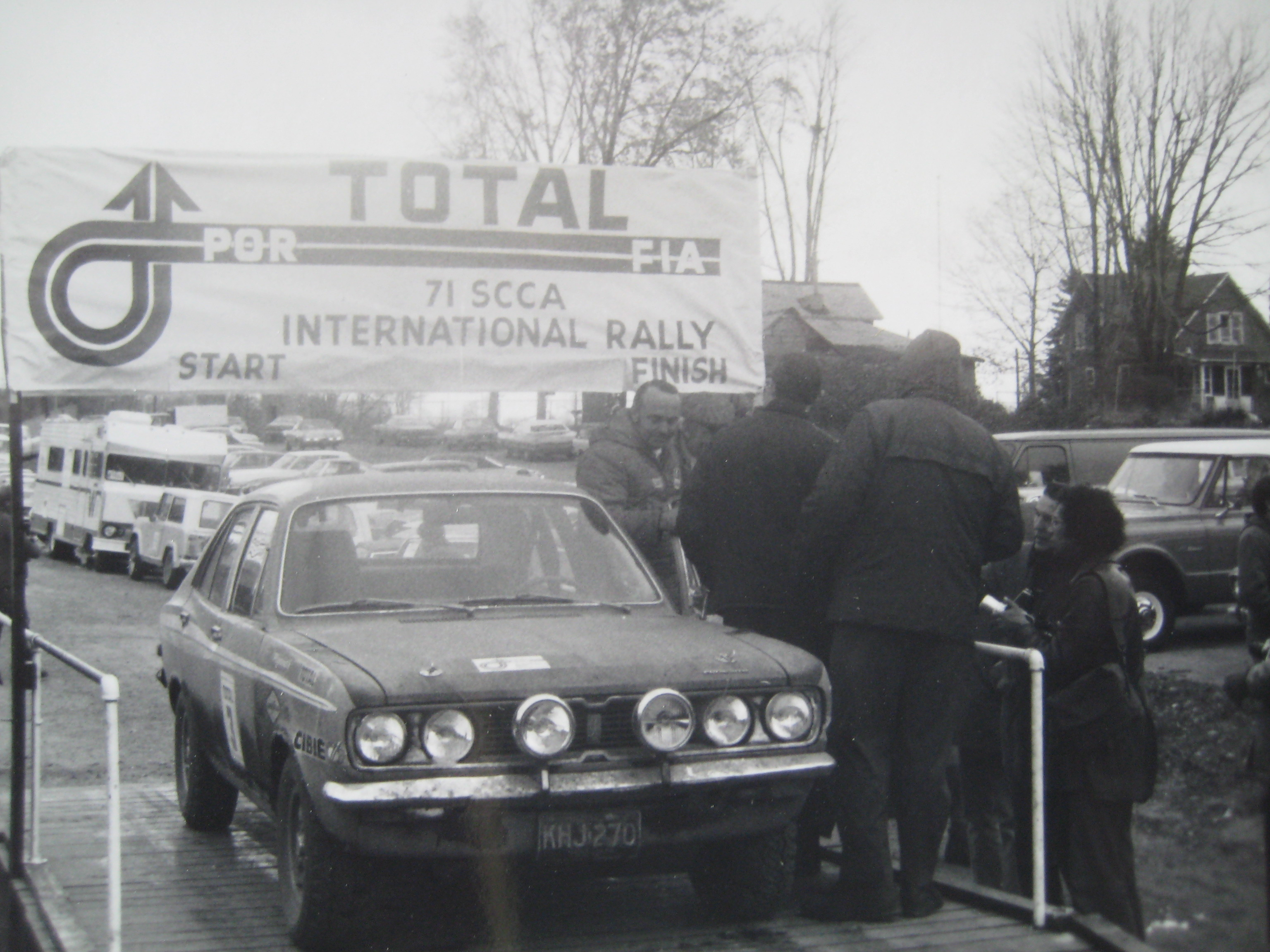
Plymouth Cricket, winner of the 1971 Press-on-Regardless Rally

Chrysler Corporation had repeatedly announced it would enter the North American small car market in the early 1970s to compete with Chevrolet Vega, Ford Pinto and AMC Gremlin, by developing and manufacturing its own domestic small car, known as its Project R-429 — subsequently delaying the project again and again.

In the meantime, having increased its ownership of Simca to 77% in 1963 and taken control of the Rootes Group by mid-1964, Chrysler had already marketed numerous Simca and Rootes models in the United States, e.g. the Simca 1204 and Sunbeam Arrow via a new Simca-Rootes Division, formed in 1966 — with 850 dealers selling four Simca models and 400 dealers selling four Rootes models. Results were dismal, and in late 1969, Chrysler announced it would henceforth market its Rootes and Simca products from its Chrysler-Plymouth Division.

==== Debut ====
The Ryton plant in Coventry built and exported a rebadged variant of the Hillman Avenger to the U.S. and Canadian markets for the 1971 model year as the Plymouth Cricket, via its Plymouth dealerships — as a 4-door saloon/sedan (and later, as a 5-door station wagon for the 1972 model year). The Cricket and the Dodge Colt marketed simultaneously at Dodge dealerships, were both seen in the industry as stop-gap measures until Chrysler could design a small car to be manufactured domestically.

A Plymouth press release from June 30, 1970 announced a formal presentation of the Cricket in November 1970, with the first shipment of 280 Crickets arriving from the UK in the U.S. on 20 November 1970. Showroom sales began January 20, 1971 carrying a MSRP of $1915 with four options: automatic transmission ($182.99), air conditioning ($345.55), whitewall tires ($28.65) and radio ($61.00) — and offering a twelve month or twelve thousand mile warranty.

Where its Hillman antecedent had been marketed as the Avenger, i.e., someone who extracts revenge, the Cricket's emblems featured a cartoonish font incorporating a flower, its marketing materials prominently featuring a cartoonish (cricket) mascot, using a The Little Car That Can, Chirp, Chirp tagline — recalling the light-hearted marketing of small cars common in the U.S., e.g., the Volkswagen Beetle, AMC Gremlin and, later, the Volkswagen Rabbit and Renault Le Car.

==== Federalization ====
To meet US DOT regulations, Rootes federalized the Avenger with the required side marker lamps, head restraints and round headlights — in both the USA and Canada, borrowed from the GL and GT model Avengers. The Cricket would subsequently receive a seat-belt warning light system (activated by a weight of 20lb or greater on a front seat) for 1972, as well as large rubber-tipped over-riders in compliance with bumper impact standards.

==== Features ====
Mechanical specifications included the Avenger's 1500 cc engine with overhead cam shaft, rated at 70 gross horsepower, with its compression lowered from 9.2 to 8.0:1, a fully synchronized manual four-speed transmission, rack and pinion steering, 9.5" front disc brakes and 8" rear drums, radial tires, MacPherson front struts and a four-link rigid/live rear axle on coil springs; and front anti-roll bars. Mechanically, the Avenger was designed for ease of service. E.g., a mechanic could reach the oil drain plug standing next to the engine bay.

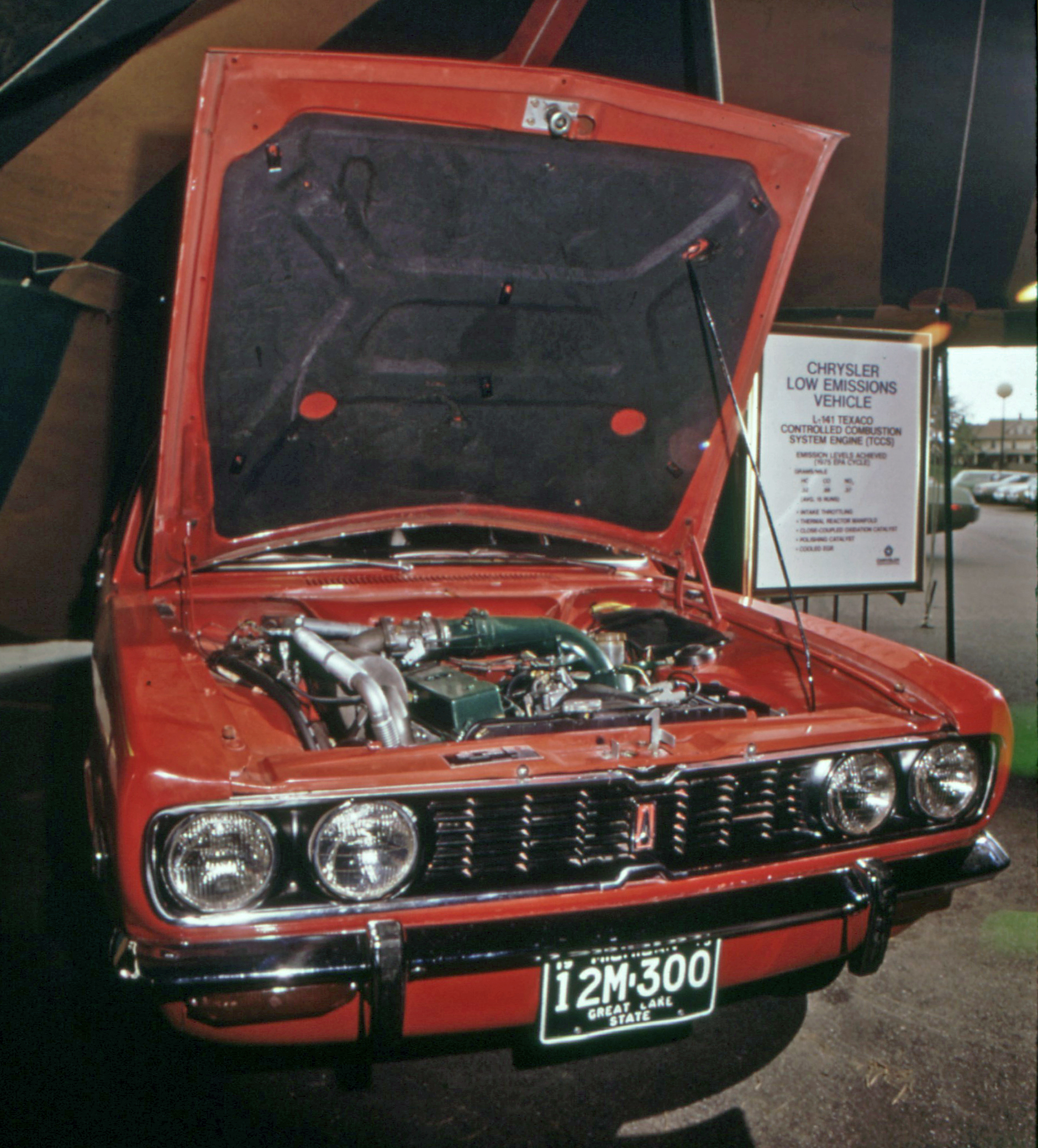
1973 Plymouth Cricket with TCCS experimental low emissions engine

With a 1971 US base price of $1915, standard features included chair-height seating, pivoting front vent windows, rear windows that rolled down completely, flow-through ventilation with rear pillar extractors, recessed exterior door handles and flush interior door handles, radial tires, rubber mat passenger floor covering, spare tire mounted beneath the flat trunk floor, power front disc brakes, child proof rear door locks, 12.2 cu.ft. trunk capacity (variously reported as 14 cu.ft.), full-width dashboard padding, two-speed fan for flow through ventilation with upper level dash vents, impact absorbing steering wheel, horn control mounted at the end of the turn signal lever, electro-dip anti-corrosion treatment, acrylic enamel paint over two primer layers in nine colors, bolt-on front fenders and a 31.75 foot turning radius.

Optional equipment included a three-speed automatic transmission ($178), air conditioning ($338), fully transistorized AM radio, flush retracting fender-mounted antenna, white sidewall tires, twin carburetor and a Decor Package which included dual horns, center console with rear ash tray,glove box light and lock, cigarette lighter, oil pressure and the alternator gauges, front door storage pockets, day/night adjustable mirror, rear seat arm rests, color-keyed carpeting, window chrome moldings, dual paint stripes on the sides, bumper guards, wheel covers, courtesy lights, dimmable instrument panel lighting, rear door courtesy light switch and upgraded upholstery available in five colors: blue, olive, tan, vellum and black. From 1972, the single carburetor / automatic choke combination, dual carburetors, and air conditioning were optional.

==== Wagon ====
A press release on 23 February 1972 announced a station wagon, to be introduced in early spring 1972, with its formal introduction at the 1972 Chicago Auto Show.

Station wagons featured a 70bhp (8.5:1 compression ratio) engine with dual carburetors; three configurations for the rear seat (seating, loading or extended to an 80" long "sleeping" mode); counterbalanced rear tailgate; 24" liftover height; 60 cu ft capacity; and an overall length 4" greater than the sedans; The wagons spare wheel was mounted under the rear load floor, outside the car, lowerable by a provided hexnut.

==== Annual updates ====
For 1971, an optional twin carburetor became available, the four-cylinder engine added 15 horsepower on August 23, 1971, and the standard engine was given an automatic choke.

The Cricket survived for two full model years: 1971 and 1972. Chrysler appeared to market a Cricket for 1973, going so far as to publish marketing materials for 1973 model year Crickets, but in fact none were imported after January 1, 1973 — and despite selling the vehicles after that as 1973 models, they carried 1972 model year vehicle identification numbers (VINs).

==== Sales and reception ====
Despite its market strengths (multi-link rear suspension, strong ride and handling, four-door configuration, standard radial tires, chair-height seating, flow through ventilation, safety innovations and economical performance — in many regards on par with its Beetle/Vega/Pinto/Gremlin competitors — the Cricket's reliability and dealer network became points of criticism. It languished in the market, with sales reaching approximately 41,000 over its two full years on the market, roughly half its projected sales. For 1971, Plymouth had sold 27,682 Crickets when Chevrolet had sold 275,000 Vegas and Ford, 352,000 Pintos. For 1972 (and 1973), 13,882 were sold.

With slow sales and stiff competition, reengineering the Cricket to meet 1974 U.S. safety, bumper and emissions standards seemed like a poor investment. The Cricket was effectively discontinued after Plymouth dealers sold the last remaining 1972 models, shortly into the 1973 Calendar Year — just prior to the gas crisis of 1973, which resulted in a sharp increase in demand for economical cars. Having reduced its economical offerings, Chrysler's sales plummeted and the company had lost a record $170 million by 1974.

In retrospect, Chrysler had poorly prepared the Cricket for the US market. Though advertising noted that the Cricket had undergone millions of miles in testing from cold-weather testing in Norway to hot-weather testing in Spain, Chrysler began marketing the Cricket in the U.S. before testing on American roads, in harsh American climates. In its December 1970 issue, Car and Driver tested the Cricket, with the reviewer left stranded roadside. Consumer Reports did not give the Cricket a "good" rating, recommending a Plymouth Valiant instead. Weaknesses included the Stromberg fuel system and Lucas electricals; a design decision to replace underseal with electrolysed paint, resulting in corrosion issues; and an MSRP very close to the Plymouth Dart/Valiant MSRP.

Chrysler complicated matters for the Cricket, in its dealership arrangements. In 1966, the corporation had set up a separate Simca-Rootes Division with its own dealership to exclusively handle the Simca 1204 and any products imported from Rootes. Chrysler subsequently withheld the Cricket from these dealerships, arguing it was not a Rootes product. The dealerships accused Chrysler of "surreptitiously" changing the name of the Rootes Group to Chrysler UK in 1970 in its dealer agreements. At a time when the concepts of captive imports and badge engineering were new, the Simca-Rootes dealers had to argue in court that the Cricket was in fact a Rootes product. A judge found that Chrysler in fact had to supply these dealerships with the Cricket, as Plymouth, no less. Subsequently, Chrysler dissolved its Simca-Rootes Division and began marketing its captive imports only through its Plymouth Dealerships. Confusingly, for 1971, Chrysler continued to market the Simca 1204 via its Plymouth Dealerships — concurrently with the Cricket.

Furthermore, at the same time, Chrysler marketed its captive imports, Chrysler executives denounced the very concept of subcompact cars, Chrysler's Chairman, Lynn Townsend saying "the subcompacts are just too small, the American people won't climb into them. They have to give up too much in creature comfort." Chrysler would later enter the US small car market in earnest in 1978 with its Dodge Omni/Plymouth Horizon twins.

=== Canada ===
The Cricket was exported to Canada at the same time as the United States, in late 1970. Following poor sales and poor reputation for build quality and performance, the Cricket was discontinued in 1973. The Cricket nameplate continued in Canada when in mid-1973, Chrysler Canada replaced the rebadged Avenger with the Mitsubishi Galant, otherwise sold as the Dodge Colt in the United States. A GT variant was marketed as the Plymouth Cricket Formula S.

For 1975, the Canadian Plymouth Cricket was rebadged as the Plymouth Colt, this time the car was a rebadged Mitsubishi Lancer. Thus began Chrysler's marketing system in Canada: selling Mitsubishi vehicles as both Dodge and Plymouth models, for example the 1975 Lancer Celeste hatchback was sold in Canada as the Dodge Arrow.

=== Denmark and Europe ===
In Denmark, the versions available were:

- 1300 (2-door saloon, 4-door saloon, 5-door estate)
- 1300 GL (2-door saloon, 4-door saloon, 5-door estate)
- 1600 GL (2-door saloon, 4-door saloon, 5-door estate)
- 1600 GLS (4-door saloon, 5-door estate)
- 1600 GT (2-door saloon, 4-door saloon)

These Danish versions had two-door equivalents which were sometimes exported back to the UK, since two-door models were phased out in the UK market in 1979. The Hillman Avenger name was not used, instead the cars were simply badged as Sunbeam and the engine size and trim level (e.g. Sunbeam 1600 GLS).

Throughout most of Europe, the Sunbeam name was used, except for the Netherlands, Italy and Spain.

=== Argentina ===
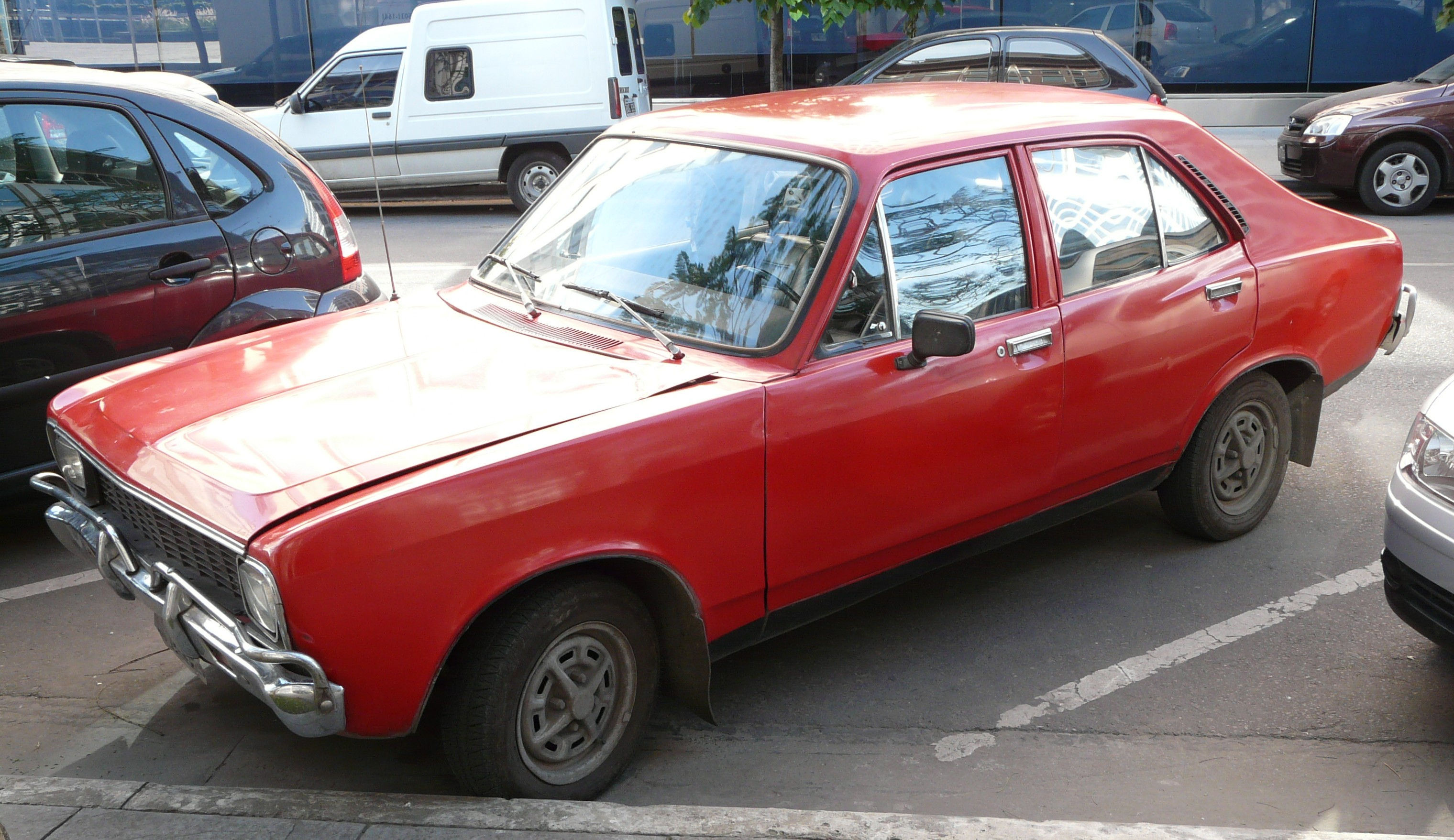
Argentinian Dodge 1500 (early model)

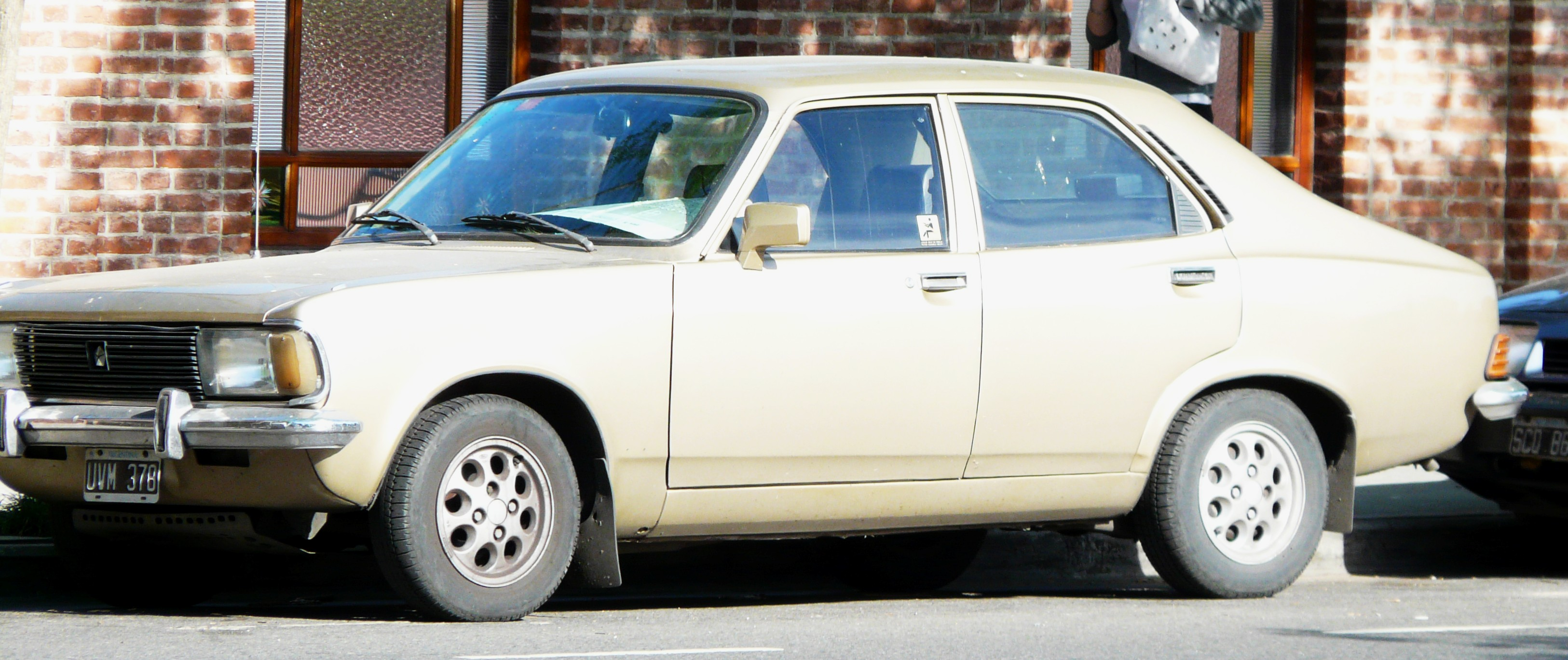
Argentinian Dodge 1500 (late model)

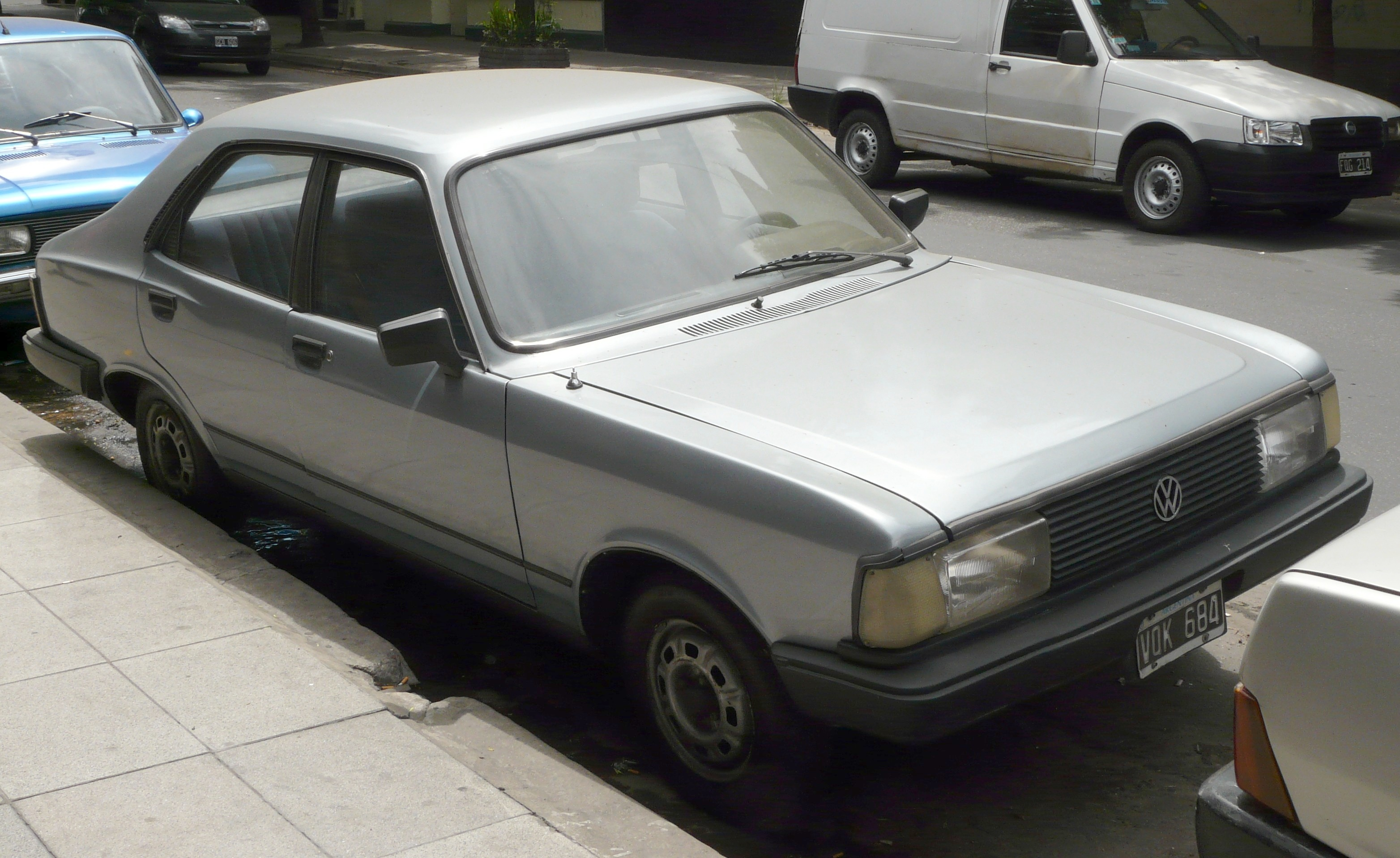
Argentinian Volkswagen 1500

The Avenger was built in Argentina between 1971 and 1990, initially as the Dodge 1500 (or Dodge 1500M with the 1.8 engine) as a four-door sedan. Chrysler Fevre Argentina produced it from 1971 to 1980 until the company was acquired by Volkswagen. Under Volkswagen Argentina it was produced between 1980 and 1986 as the Volkswagen 1500. A joint venture with Autolatina saw the model further produced from 1986 to 1989.

==== Production ====
Chrysler Fevre Argentina began production of the Dodge 1500 in August 1971. In 1974, the sports version called "GT90" was launched, a name that derives from the 90 HP developed by its 1500 cc engine but with improvements in the camshaft, a sports exhaust manifold and exhaust, and two horizontal draft carburettors. In the same year, the "SP" version was launched on the market, with orange bodywork, with a 4-speed automatic transmission or a 4-speed manual transmission with a lever to the floor and black side bands.

In 1975, the engine was upgraded to a 1.8 unit which it sought to improve its performance and face its market competitors. The seats were finished in fabric. With the 1.8 engine, the model was marketed as the GT100. This model was unique in being finished in either blue with white stripes or black with gold lines, with GT100 badge on the left side. The car was well received and was chosen by several racers to race in the 1976 Turismo Competencia 2000.

In 1977, the Dodge 1500 GT-100 producing 105 bhp (78 kW) was introduced. It had the 1800 engine, two Stromberg carburettors, a 8.5 in (22 cm) diameter clutch and a high performance manifold. This model could only be had in dark blue or black with obligatory sports stripes. Race car driver Jorge Omar del Río won the Argentine TC2000 in a Dodge 1500 GT-100 in 1980, and again in 1981 and 1982.

In 1978, the first station wagon was produced and sold as the Dodge 1500 Rural. Later on, the Rural was only available with the 1.8 liter engine, albeit still using the "1500" name.

At the beginning of 1980, Volkswagen acquired Chrysler International's remaining shares in their Argentinian subsidiary when the latter withdrew from South America (Volkswagen held 49% since earlier). The deal included the tooling to the Dodge 1500. The Chrysler range was discontinued, but the Dodge 1500 continued with a new "Serie W" suffix. In 1982, the car was renamed the Volkswagen 1500 (not to be confused with the totally different Volkswagen Type 3, which had been sold elsewhere in the world between 1961 and 1973 as a Volkswagen 1500 too).

Under Volkswagen, the car received its final facelift, gaining a sloping front grille which was more in vogue in the early 1980s. Details such as the rearview mirrors and door-handles were replaced by squared-off units in black plastic, rather than the earlier chromed filigrane ones. Production ended in 1990, and was replaced with the more modern Volkswagen Gacel/Senda, with a total of 262,668 units sold in its almost 20-year lifespan. This vehicle was very popular with taxi drivers, but by the end of 1998, they had all fallen afoul of the ten-year age rule on Argentine taxi vehicles. It was also very popular in the early TC 2000 touring car racing series, winning the 1980, 1981 and 1982 championships.

==== Specifications ====
| Model | Motor | Power@rpm | Torque@rpm | Acceleration 0–100 km/h | Maximum Speed | Transmission | Fuel Consumption |
|---|---|---|---|---|---|---|---|
| 1.5 STD y SPL | 1498 cc I4 8V OHV | 72 hp a 5400 | 122 Nm a 3200 | 16s | 143.7 km/h | 4 speed manual | 8.8 km/l |
| 1.5 SPL AT | 1498 cc I4 8V OHV | 72 hp a 5400 | 122 Nm a 3200 | 18s | 143.7 km/h | 4 speed automatic | 8 km/l |
| 1.5 GT90 | 1498 cc I4 8V OHV | 90 hp a 5600 | 135 Nm a 3800 | 13.6s | 156.6 km/h | 4 speed manual | 8 km/l |
| 1.8 M | 1798 cc I4 8V OHV | 92 hp a 4900 | 160 Nm a 3400 | 14s | 157.5 km/h | 4 speed manual | 8.8 km/l |
| 1.8 GT100 | 1798 cc I4 8V OHV | 120 hp a 5300 | 165 Nm a 4200 | 11.5s | 169.8 km/h | 4 speed manual | 9.6 km/l |

=== Brazil ===
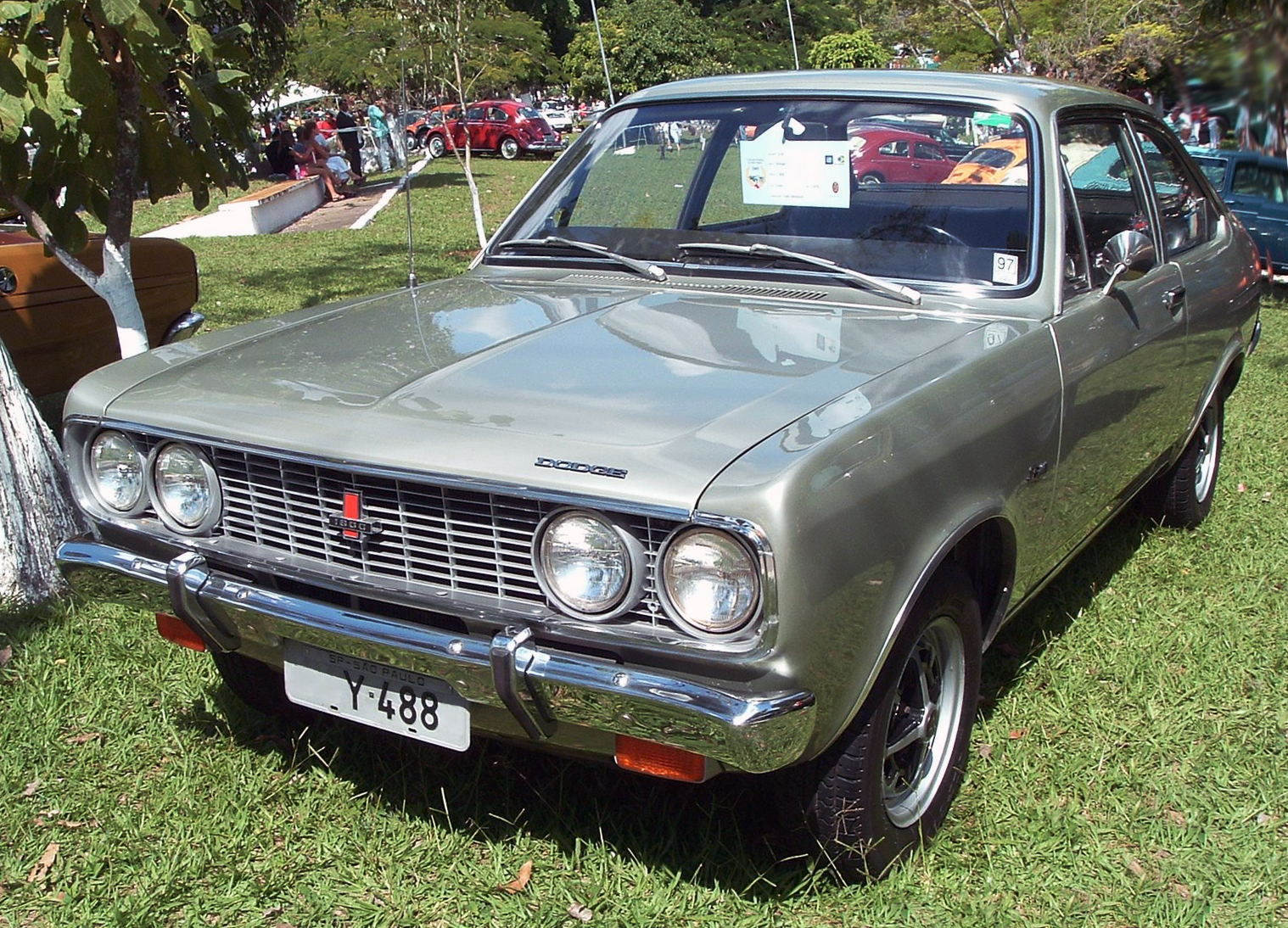
Early Brazilian Dodge 1800 coupé

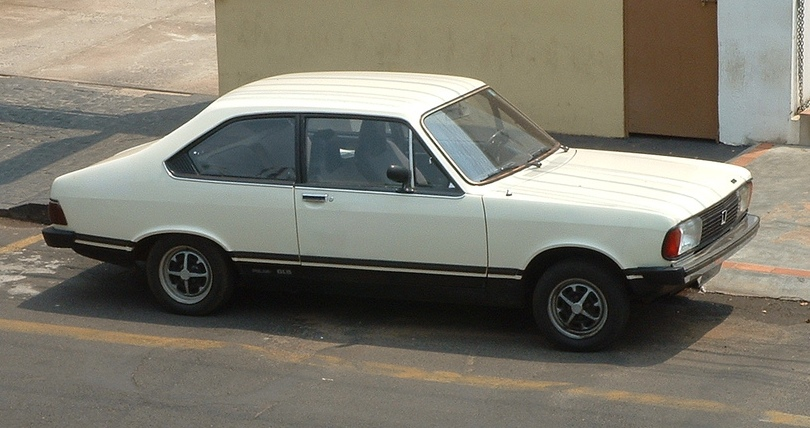
Brazilian Dodge Polara

The Avenger was also built in Brazil from 1973 to 1981 in two-door sedan form only, sold initially as Dodge 1800, named for its motor — the engine design was the same as found in Avengers sold elsewhere, although enlarged to a 1.8 L capacity. Styling was completely different from the British built Avengers (which only arrived four months later), with the bodywork from the A-pillar back being unique. The differences are very small, with the rear side window being somewhat larger and the overall appearance being slightly less curvy than the British model. More obvious is the use of larger bumpers, a four-headlamp grille (which was different from the design found on the quadruple headlamp Avengers and the American Plymouth Cricket), and conventional tail lights, which did not have the "hockeystick" shape of the Hillman Avenger. It was presented at the São Paulo Motor Show in November 1972.

In 1975, the Avenger was the first car to be converted to alcohol as part of Brazil’s program to use excess sugar cane as fuel.

In 1976, the car was renamed Dodge Polara (a nameplate Chrysler previously used on full-sized Dodge models in the U.S. and on a series of large Dodges in Argentina), and underwent a comprehensive facelift (in 1978), gaining the Chrysler Avenger's front styling, and dashboard setup, the revised bumpers and tail light treatments remaining unique to Brazil. Brazil added GLS and GL models in 1980, making it the first Brazilian production vehicle to have a standard automatic transmission. A further light facelift was made in 1980 before production ceased in 1981 following Chrysler's exit from South America.

As with Argentina, Volkswagen continued to assemble the Brazilian Avenger and the 1980–81 versions were called “Dodge 1500 made by Volkswagen Argentina” (the "Made by Volkswagen Argentina" portion was added in a sticker on the rear window or a metal plate in the front). 1982 saw the Volkswagen restyling that also took place in Argentina and the car was renamed the Volkswagen 1500.

=== New Zealand ===
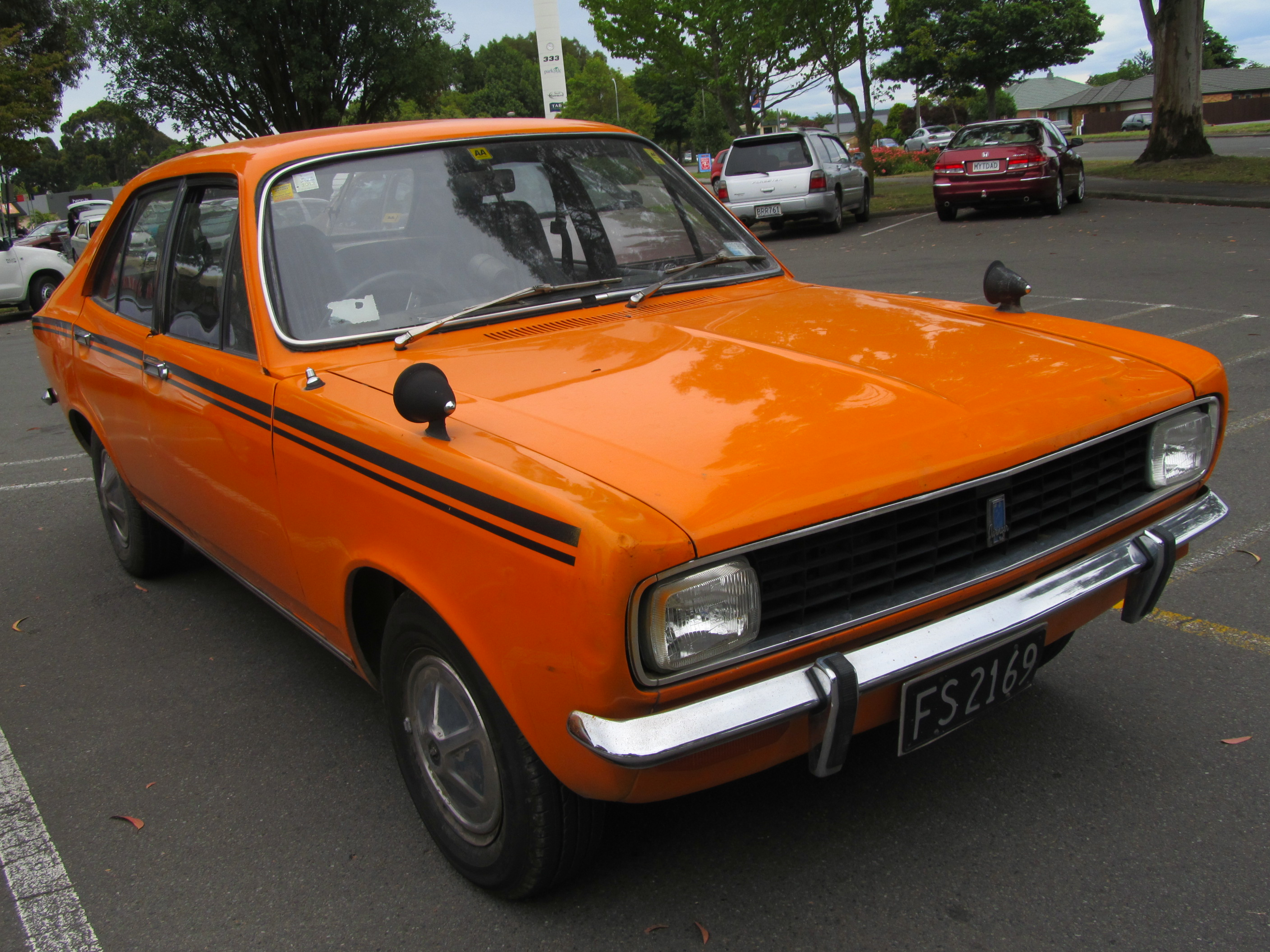
New Zealand-assembled 1971 Hillman Avenger

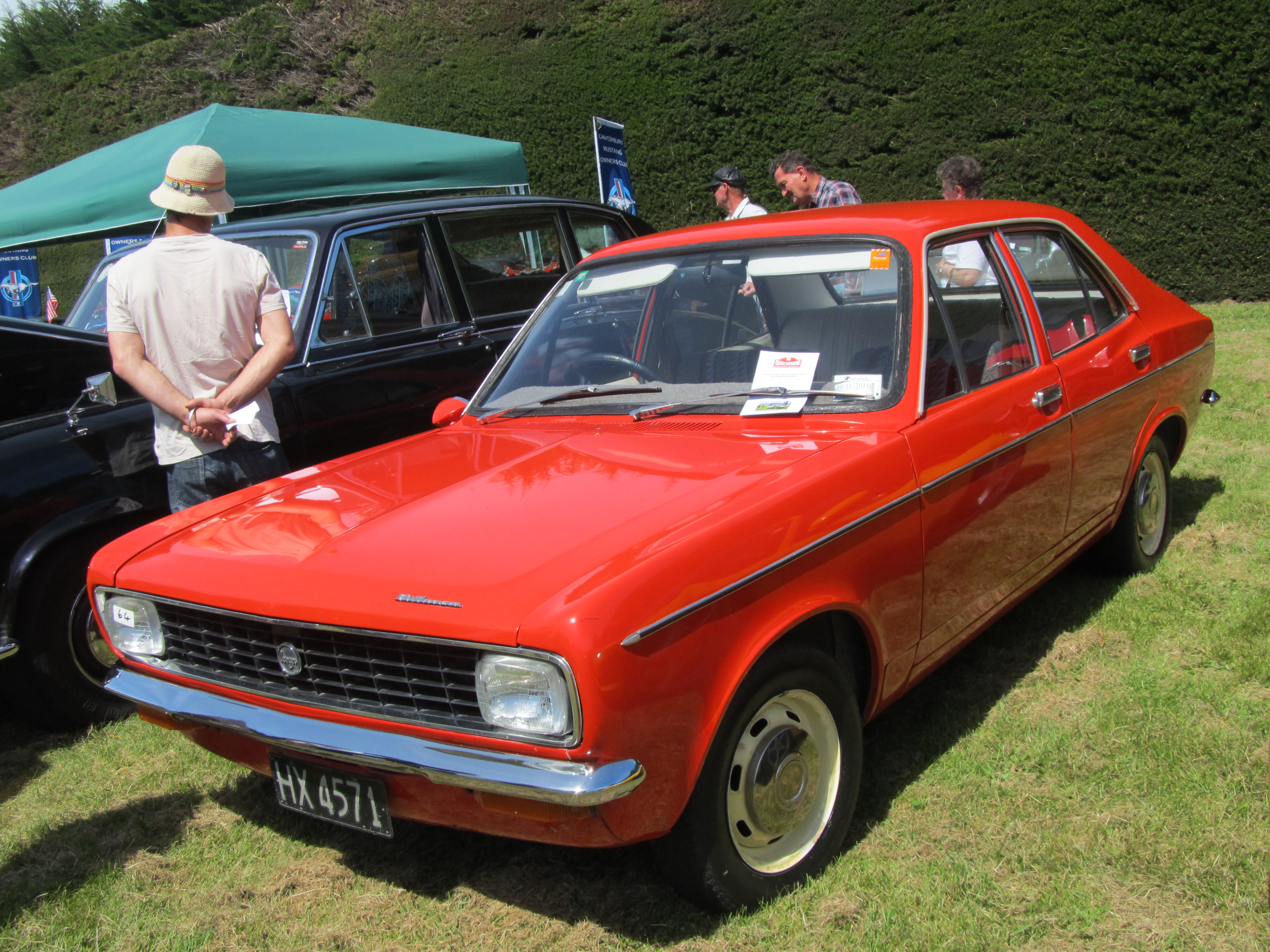
1976 New Zealand-assembled Hillman Avenger

The Avenger was sold by Todd Motors in New Zealand from 1970 to 1980 in four-door sedan and five-door wagon (1975 onward) forms only. Todd's of Petone and later, Porirua also sold Chrysler Australia and Mitsubishi products and their assembly lines both at the original Petone plant (dating from the mid-1930s) and the new purpose-built plant opened in Porirua in 1974 were notable for the variety of models coming down the twin final assembly lines at any one time. Vehicles sharing the trim lines with the Avenger on a daily shift might include the Hillman Hunter, Chrysler Valiant and Alpine hatchback, Mitsubishi Galant, Mirage and Lancer, as well as the Datsun 180B (due to Todd Motors for a time having a contract to build those as Nissan's other contractor at the time, Campbell Motor Industries, did not have enough capacity).

The New Zealand Avenger was initially similar to the British line but there was just one engine and trim level to start: the 'Super' (two headlights, vinyl trim, 1.5 L single carburettor engine, manual 4-speed gearbox.). In 1971, Todd's added a unique-to-NZ, sporty, 1.5-litre twin-carburettor 'TC' model with all-black interior trim, dashtop rev counter, side striping, high-back 'tombstone' front seats, special bright paint colours and new wheel trims, among other detail changes. This was loosely based on the UK GT but lacked that car's 'Rostyle' wheels, using locally made, lookalike pressed aluminium wheel trims instead.

The TC was effectively replaced in 1973 by the more upmarket Avenger Alpine, another local special loosely based on the UK 'GL' (four headlights, four-round-dials dashboard instead of a rectangular instrument cluster (though early cars had a blanked-off space instead of the rev counter standardised later), better trim, twin carburettors and vinyl roof), initially with the twin-carburettor 1.5 L engine (changed to a 1.6 L from 1973, later changed again to a single-carb unit and also available for the first time with automatic transmission, the Borg Warner 45 four-speed unit). The Super sedan also gained the 1.6 L engine and auto option in '73 while the range was expanded in 1975 when 1.3 L variants (a result of the fuel crisis that also prompted rival Ford New Zealand to reintroduce a Cortina 1.3) and 1.6 L manual or automatic 'Super' wagon models were added to the New Zealand assembled range.

Todd's updated its Avenger line in 1978 with the Simca-style front end and dashboard and new tail lights, and added a luxury GLS version, similar to the UK model, in place of the earlier Alpine while the range was rebranded Chrysler Avenger. It again broadly followed the British lineup, albeit with a limited range of models, now consisting of a 1.3 GL sedan, a 1.6 LS wagon (marketed as Avenger Estate) and 1.6 GLS sedans, again with manual or automatic transmissions. The 'base' 1.3 GL sedan was a very popular entry level B-category model for rental car company Avis right up to the Avenger's demise in 1980.

While Avenger models in Europe were rebranded as Talbot, the New Zealand Avengers kept the Chrysler branding for 1980. 1980 models could be identified by a black grille, protective black body-side mouldings, window blackouts and unadorned steel wheels. New Zealand assembly finally ceased in November 1980, due to the strength of the Pound Sterling.

A variant unique to New Zealand, available for some years, was a van which was basically the manual Avenger wagon with a flat rear floor in place of rear seats and fixed, rather than wind-down, rear door windows. This, and rival models, were introduced around 1975 to get around New Zealand's strict oil crisis hire purchase laws that required a 60 per cent deposit for a new car with only 12-month terms, versus 25 per cent and three years for a light commercial vehicle.

All New Zealand Avengers from 1973 onwards had metric instruments.

Along with the 1971–1979 Vauxhall HC Viva, 1968–1972 FD Victors, and 1976–1981 Vauxhall Chevette ranges, and Austin Allegro, Maxi and Princess, the Avenger was one of several British models to be sold in New Zealand but not Australia. The Avenger was initially planned as a Hillman Hunter replacement for Australia but, due to economics of sourcing, the Japanese Mitsubishi Galant was chosen instead by Chrysler Australia for that market, though it was marketed as the 'Chrysler Galant'. By contrast in New Zealand, the Avenger, Hunter and Mitsubishi Galant (offered from 1972–1977, in coupé form only) co-existed together in Todd Motors' overall lineup, though the Avenger-sized (but much more cramped inside) Mitsubishi Lancer eventually went into local assembly in 1975. The Avenger was the last car of British origins to be assembled by Todd Motors; in all, 26,500 examples were assembled locally while an additional 2,000 were imported fully built-up.

=== South Africa ===
The Avenger was assembled and sold in South Africa badged as the Dodge Avenger. To satisfy local content rules a locally made 1.6 L Peugeot engine, shared with the locally assembled Peugeot 404, was used. The Avenger was available from 1975 until its discontinuation in 1976, when it was renamed as a Chrysler. After Chrysler ZA was merged into Sigma Motor Corporation in 1976, the Avenger was soon cancelled to allow SIGMA to free up more production capacity for the Mazda 323.

=== Iran ===
The Avenger was built in Iran from 1978–1980 in two-door, 60 hp (45 kW) form by Iran Khodro Co. and called the Hillman Avenger aside the locally manufactured Hillman Hunter (called Paykan). The engine used in it was the Hunter engine also used in the Paykan. The four-door Avenger was also imported to Iran for a few years, starting in 1975.

=== Uruguay ===
An Avenger-based coupe utility (pickup) called the Dodge 1500 Pickup was made in Uruguay, but the conversion failed to properly account for structural rigidity and they literally broke apart.
