= Gerry McGovern =

English car designer (born 1956)

Gerry McGovern OBE
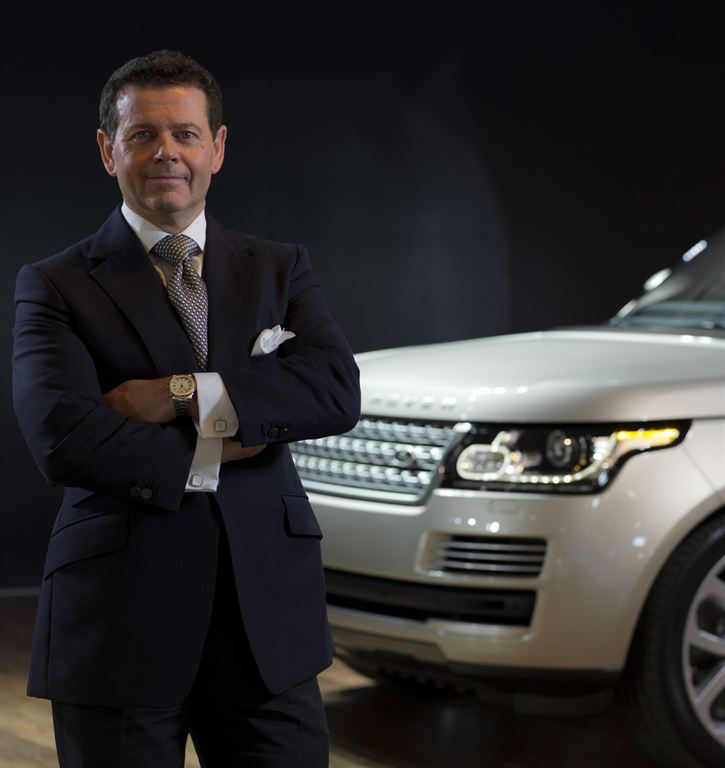
- Gerry McGovern with the fourth generation Range Rover
- Born: 1956 (age 69–70); Coventry, Warwickshire, England
- Occupation: Car designer

Gerard Gabriel McGovern OBE (born 1956 in Coventry) is an English car designer and was the Chief Creative Officer for Jaguar Land Rover leading the Group’s Design Studio at Gaydon, Warwickshire, creating concepts and new models. A strong advocate of design's relevance to brand equity, he is a member of the Jaguar Land Rover board of Management.

== Background ==
McGovern was born in Coventry in 1956 where he attended primary and Binley Park secondary schools. While still at the latter, he was introduced to Chrysler design boss Roy Axe, who was to remain a major influence. Chrysler sponsored McGovern at the Lanchester Polytechnic (now Coventry University) where he completed a degree in industrial design before attending the Royal College of Art in London, specialising in automotive design.

== Career ==
=== Chrysler Europe ===
While sponsored by Chrysler Europe, McGovern started work at the Styling Studio at Whitley, Coventry. In 1978 McGovern began working for US carmaker Chrysler in Highland Park, near Detroit, before returning to the UK as a Senior Designer for Chrysler Europe and Peugeot; here he worked alongside Peter Horbury (later Head of Design for Volvo in Sweden) and Moray Callum (formerly Head of Design for Mazda, then Director of Ford’s Car design division).

=== British Leyland ===
In 1982 McGovern rejoined Roy Axe (now Design Director) at Austin Rover Group. Through this period he worked on the MG EX-E concept car, was the lead designer of the critically acclaimed MG F sports car and the Land Rover Freelander (the best selling compact SUV in Europe for 7 years), and led the team that created the third generation Range Rover.

=== Ford ===
In 1999 Ford Motor Company hired McGovern to head up and rejuvenate Lincoln-Mercury design. He set up a new design studio in California and became only the second design professional to be appointed to the Lincoln Mercury Board. Among his hires was Marek Reichman, who went on to become Aston Martin Design Director.

In 2003, McGovern returned to the UK as Creative Director of Lugeii, Ford’s design and creativity centre, Ingeni in Soho, London.

=== Land Rover ===
McGovern joined Land Rover as Director, Advanced Design in April 2004. Explaining why, McGovern said, "Land Rover fascinates me more than any other car maker because it has its roots in pure design as opposed to styling." Ford's Group VP Design, J Mays, noted that "Gerry is uniquely suited to this role. He's already shown the world that he fully understands Land Rover's DNA." He joined the Executive Committee of Land Rover in June 2008.

=== Jaguar Land Rover ===
McGovern joined the Executive Committee of Jaguar Land Rover when the two companies merged in 2013.

He was appointed Officer of the Order of the British Empire (OBE) in the 2020 New Year Honours for services to automotive design.

As part of Jaguar’s repositioning strategy, Gerry McGovern led a major brand redesign. However, the new design language received mixed reviews. Some criticised the brand relaunch video as being too woke.

On 2 December 2025, Autocar India reported he had left the business and was 'escorted out of the building'.

On 14 December 2025, a JLR spokesperson stated that "it is untrue that Jaguar Land Rover have terminated Gerry McGovern's employment." In March 2026, JLR confirmed that McGovern was stepping down at the end of the month, to establish his own creative consultancy.

== Land Rover designs ==
McGovern’s first introduction was the LRX concept. LRX was subsequently confirmed for 2011 production and introduced as the compact two litre Range Rover Evoque, with anticipated CO_{2} emissions of 130g/km. The Range Rover Evoque is the smallest, lightest and most efficient Range Rover. Gerry McGovern has also guided the evolution of the 2010 Range Rover, Range Rover Sport and Discovery 4, the latter going on sale globally in September 2009. He then designed the 4th generation Range Rover and 2nd generation Range Rover Sport, released in 2012 and 2013; both of these quickly became successful. He then began the redesign of the Land Rover Freelander as the Discovery Sport. His most recent designs to be released are the New Defender in 2020 and the latest iteration of the Range Rover which was unveiled in October 2021.
