= Rover CCV =

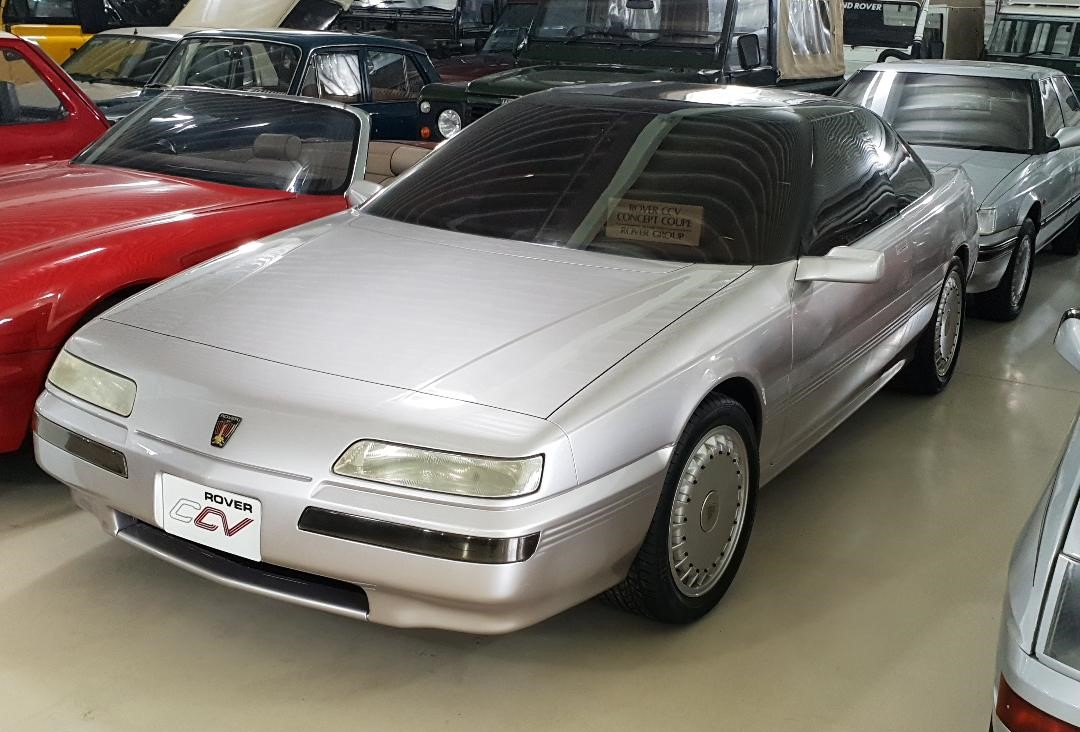
Rover CCV in the British Motor Museum, 2024

The Rover CCV is a concept car shown by the British car company Austin Rover Group at the Turin Motor Show 1986 under the Rover marque.

The CCV name stands for Coupé Concept Vehicle.

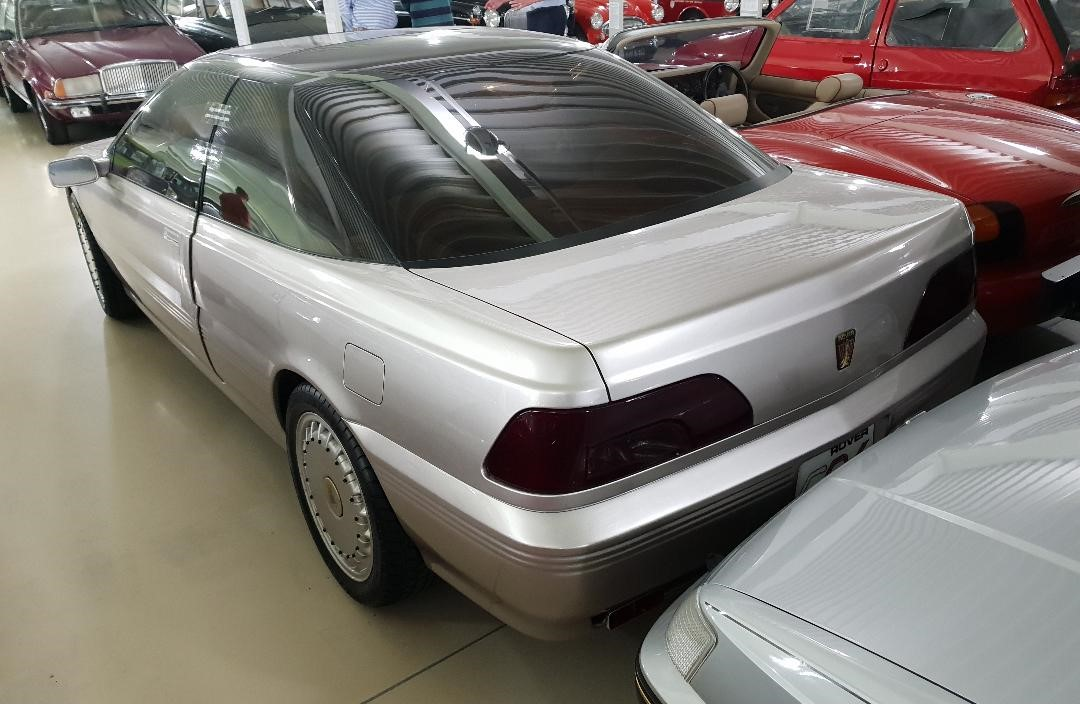
Rear CCV

Designed by Roy Axe, it followed similar design themes of the 1985 MG EX-E. The CCV's drag co-efficient was 0.27.

The CCV's two-door coupé design gave a preview of a potential coupé version of the Rover 800, which did not appear until 1991.
