= Bentley Java =

Concept car

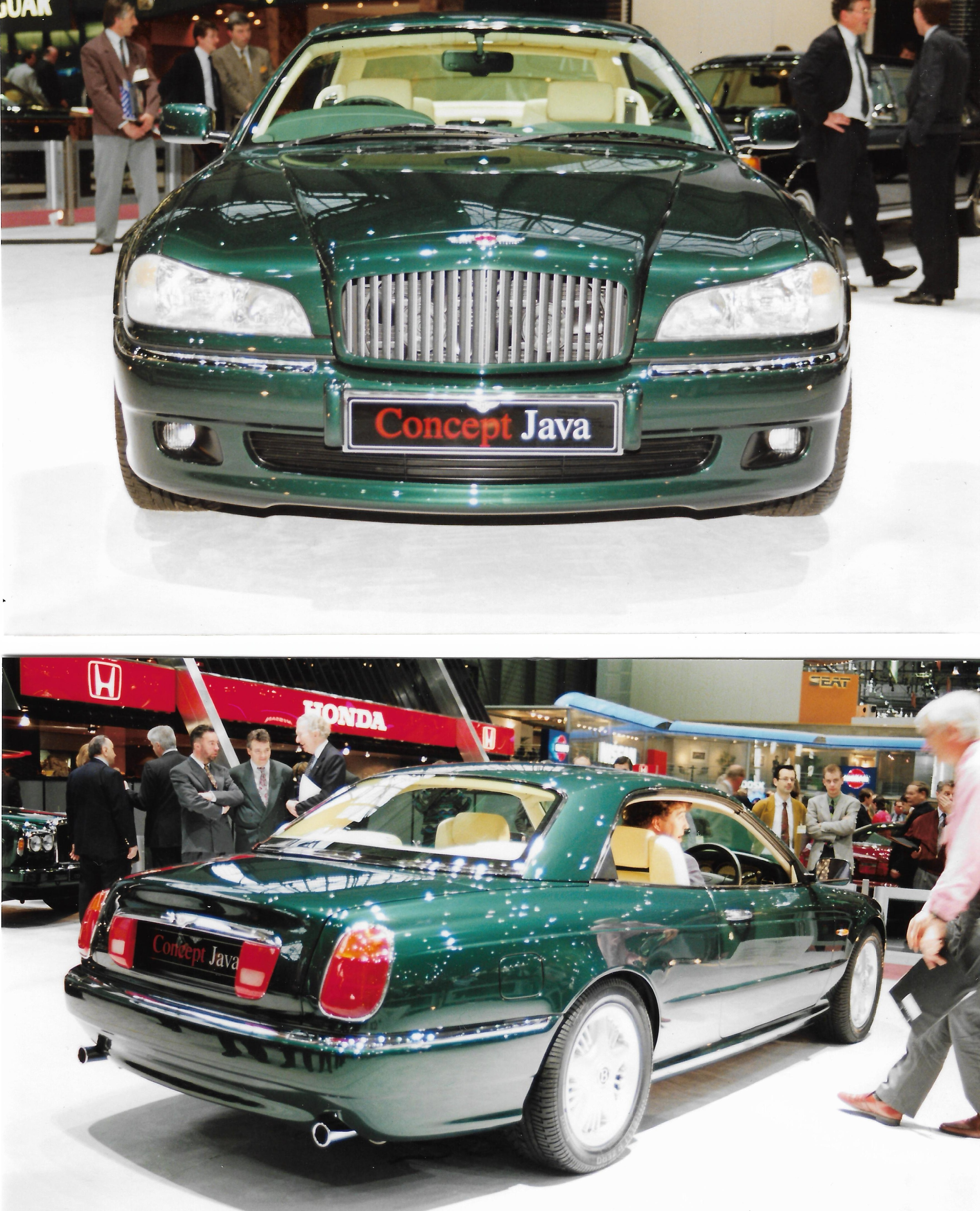
1994 Bentley Java concept

The Bentley Java is a concept car shown at the 1994 Geneva Motor Show. It was designed by Rolls-Royce head of design Graham Hull in collaboration with Roy Axe of Design Research Associates.

Although only intended to be a show car, 18 Javas were produced to order between 1994 and 1996 for Mohammed Mandari then sold to Sultan Hassanal Bolkiah Mu'izzaddin Waddaulah, the current Sultan and Yang Di-Pertuan of Brunei Darussalam. There were 6 coupes, 6 convertibles and 6 estates. They were built on a BMW 5 Series (E34) platform and reportedly powered by a 3.5L (although some sources say it was 4.0L) BMW twin-turbocharged 32 valve V8 engine modified by Cosworth and coupled to a 4-speed automatic transmission sending power to the rear wheels. Rolls-Royce's projected performance figures for the original Java coupe concept with this engine were 0-60 mph (97 km/h) in 5.6 seconds and an electronically governed top speed of 155 mph (249 km/h), however, actual performance figures for the production models are unknown.

A second generation of the Java, codenamed P1000, was reportedly in development in 1996, based on the new E39 generation of BMW 5 Series. The project, however, ended up being shelved and the Java's concept was ultimately realised in the form of the Bentley Continental GT as a smaller less expensive Bentley with wider appeal and larger volume production. Some design elements, such as the shape of the dashboard, were carried over from Java into the Continental GT as well.
