= Roy Axe =

British car designer

- Born: Royden Axe; September 1937; Scunthorpe, Lincolnshire, England
- Died: 5 October 2010 (aged 73); Florida, United States
- Occupation: Car designer
- Known for: Chrysler Alpine, Hillman Avenger/Plymouth Cricket, Chrysler Horizon, Rover 800
- Spouse: Pat
- Children: Son Chris and daughter Jane

Royden Axe (September 1937 – 5 October 2010) was a British car designer, widely known for his design work on the Chrysler Alpine, Hillman Avenger/Plymouth Cricket, Chrysler Horizon, and Rover 800 — as well his affable character and ability to realize his designs fully — for radiating enthusiasm about cars.

He received a Lifetime Award from the Coventry Lanchester Polytech Faculty of Art and Design, in 1985, and an Honorary Degree from University of Central England at Birmingham in 1995.

== Early life and career ==
Axe was born in Scunthorpe and attended Scunthorpe Grammar School (now St Lawrence Academy).

Having begun his career in 1959 with the Rootes Group, Axe joined the company on a three week apprenticeship, and did not leave until 1976. At Rootes he progressed first to chief stylist and then to Design Director — at age 29. As Rootes became part of Chrysler Europe in 1966 along with Simca, Axe led the styling efforts on almost all of the Chrysler/Rootes/Simca products of the early to mid-1970s, including the Hillman Avenger/Plymouth Cricket, Simca 1308/Chrysler Alpine and Chrysler Horizon — the latter two which won 1976 and 1978 European Car of the Year, respectively. Following Chrysler Europe's collapse in 1977, Axe moved to Detroit to head Chrysler's styling studios in the United States, where he worked on the original Chrysler minivans as well as the 1981–1983 Chrysler Imperial.

In 1982, Axe returned to the United Kingdom, joining British Leyland (BL) where he took over as styling director from David Bache who had been sacked from BL over disagreements with the company boss Harold Musgrove concerning the Austin Maestro), still under development. Axe was responsible for building a new styling studio at their Canley, Coventry plant; the former opened in 1982. He also recruited a new team. Early projects from the new studio included Project XX (the Rover 800) and the MG EX-E concept car. Axe retired from Rover at age 55.

In 1991, Axe became head of the Warwick-based vehicle design consultancy Design Research Associates (DRA), which resulted from a management buyout of Rover's design studio in 1986. DRA was acquired by Arup in 1999.

=== Examples of Axe's car designs ===
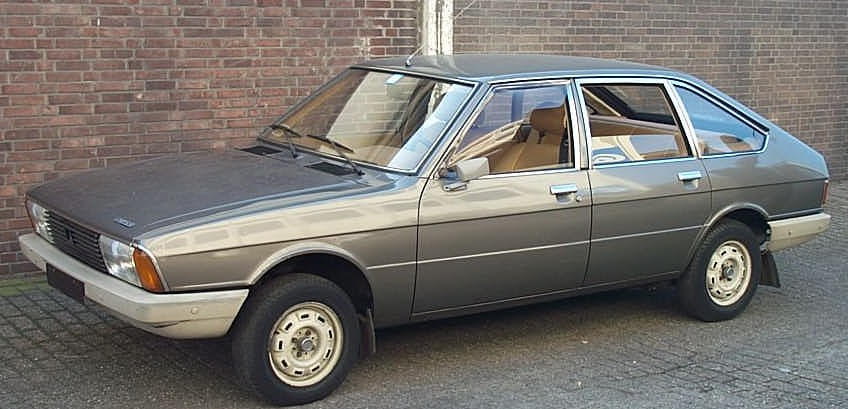
- Chrysler Alpine, European Car of the Year in 1976
  1967 Sunbeam Rapier and Sunbeam Alpine fastback coupés
- 1970 Hillman Avenger / Plymouth Cricket
- 1975 Chrysler Alpine (Talbot)
- 1976 Hillman Hunter
- 1977 Iran Khodro Paykan facelift
- 1979 Chrysler Horizon (Talbot)
- 1980 Talbot Tagora
- 1985 MG EX-E concept car
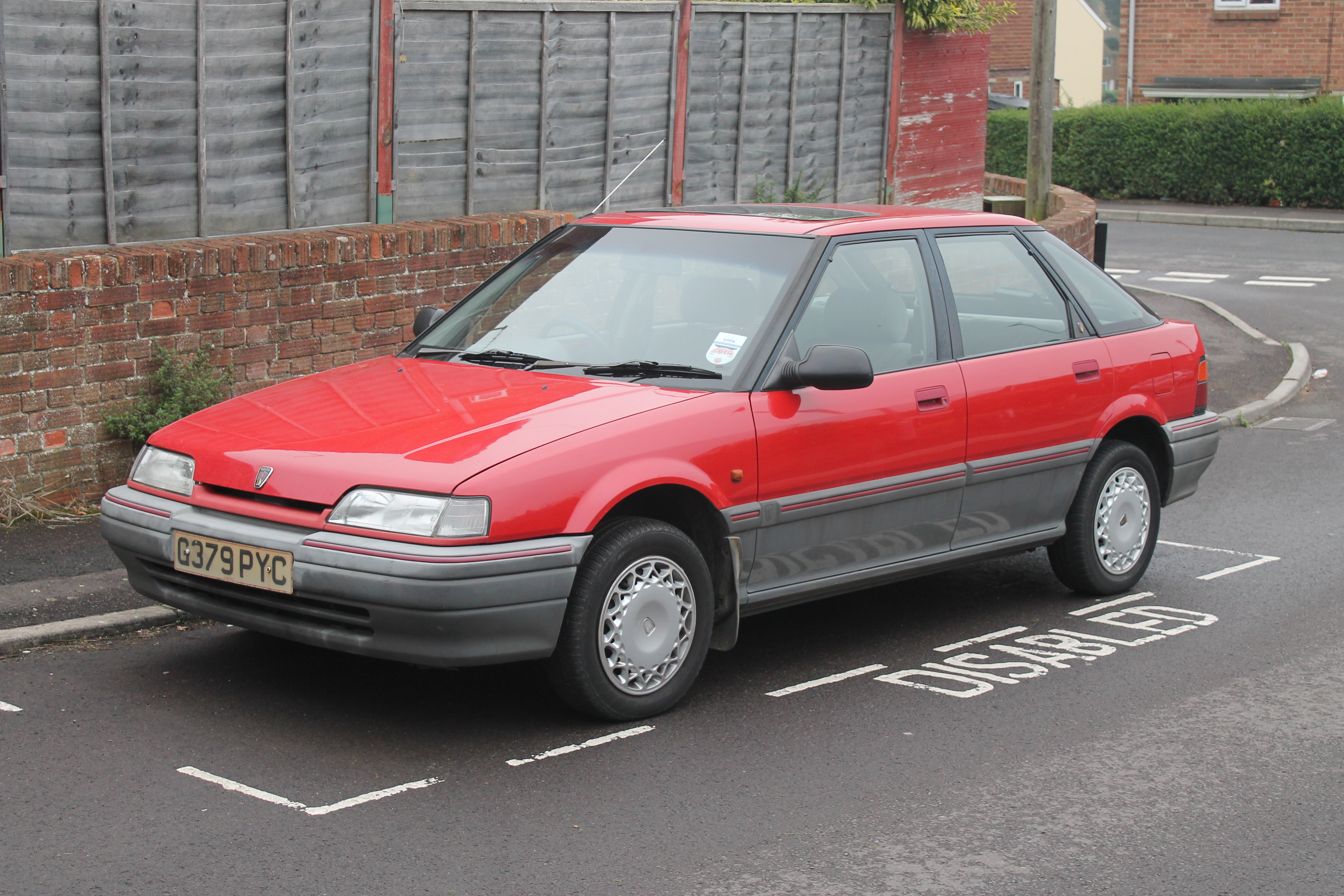
  Rover 214 (R8)
- 1986 Rover CCV concept car
- 1986 Rover 800 (developed in conjunction with the Honda Legend)
- 1989 Rover 200/400 (R8)
- 1994 Bentley Java concept car

Axe was also involved in the design of the 1984 Austin Montego. The design had been initiated prior to his joining BL, but he was able to make last-minute changes to it shortly before it entered production. Cosmetic changes – which aimed to improve the by-then dated design – included black trim along the car's waist line. Due to BL's financial problems, the release of the Montego, and the related David Bache-designed Austin Maestro hatchback had been delayed by several years.

== Personal life ==
After selling DRA to Arup in 1999, Axe moved to Sarasota, Florida with his family. He died on 5 October 2010 after battling cancer for two years.

== Bibliography ==
- A Life in Style, Autobiography of Roy Axe, ISBN 0-9566845-0-5
