= Chrysler Alpine =

Large family car made by Chrysler Europe

- Chrysler Alpine GL

Overview
- Manufacturer: Chrysler Europe (1975–1979); PSA Peugeot Citroën (1979–1986)
- Also called: Simca 1308/1309/1508/1609; Chrysler 150 (Spain); Chrysler Alpine (UK, Ireland, New Zealand); Dodge Alpine (Colombia); Talbot 1510/150; Talbot Alpine (UK, Ireland, New Zealand); Talbot Solara; Talbot SX
- Production: 1975–1986
- Assembly: France: Poissy (Poissy plant); United Kingdom: Ryton-on-Dunsmore (Ryton plant); Spain: Madrid (Chrysler España); Colombia: Bogotá (Chrysler Colmotores); Finland: Uusikaupunki (Valmet Automotive); New Zealand: Porirua (Todd Motors)
- Designer: Roy Axe

Body and chassis
- Class: Large family car (D)
- Layout: FF layout
- Related: Simca 1100; Simca Horizon

Powertrain
- Engine: petrol: 1294 cc Type 315 ohv I4; 1442 cc Type 315 ohv I4; 1592 cc Type 315 ohv I4; diesel: 1905 cc XUD9 I4 (Finland)
- Transmission: 4 speed manual all-synchromesh 5-speed manual 3-speed automatic

Dimensions
- Wheelbase: 102.5 in (2,604 mm)
- Length: 167 in (4,242 mm)
- Width: 66 in (1,676 mm)
- Kerb weight: 2,314 lb (1,050 kg)

Chronology
- Predecessor: Simca 1301/1501; Hillman Hunter
- Successor: Peugeot 405

The Chrysler Alpine, or Simca 1307, is a large family car produced by Chrysler Europe and subsequently PSA Peugeot Citroën from 1975 to 1986. Codenamed 'C6' in development, the car was styled in the United Kingdom by Roy Axe and his team at Whitley, and the car was engineered by Simca at Poissy in France.

A modern, front-wheel drive hatchback, it was one of the earliest such cars in the large family class along with the Renault 20/Renault 30 and Volkswagen Passat, and became the 1976 European Car of the Year. It had been in development since 1972.

The model was marketed variously as the Simca 1308 and 1309 models (with larger engines), Chrysler Alpine (UK, Ireland and New Zealand), Dodge Alpine (Colombia), Chrysler 150 (Spanish market), and later Talbot 1510 / Talbot Alpine / Talbot 150 (a facelifted version launched by PSA after its takeover of Chrysler Europe) and Talbot Solara (the saloon version).

== History ==
Originally the car was powered by 1294 cc and 1442 cc versions of the "Poissy engine" with electronic ignition and a four-speed gearbox. From launch it was available in three trim levels: GL, S and GT. Equipment levels were high, with the later GLS version featuring central door locking and electric windows, accessories that up until then had only generally featured in larger more upmarket cars. Having won the Car of the Year award, it was initially a success both at home and in the export. Production levels shot up from a daily 400 at introduction in September 1975 to 850 in December of that year, to 1100 a day in late 1976. The 1307 (7 CV) had the smaller engine, while the 1308 (8 CV) received the larger version. Unlike the other models, the more sporting 1307 S received twin Weber carburettors in continental European markets to provide a more powerful and revvy engine while remaining in a lower tax category. In the UK, the 1307 S has the same single Solex carburettor as the GL.

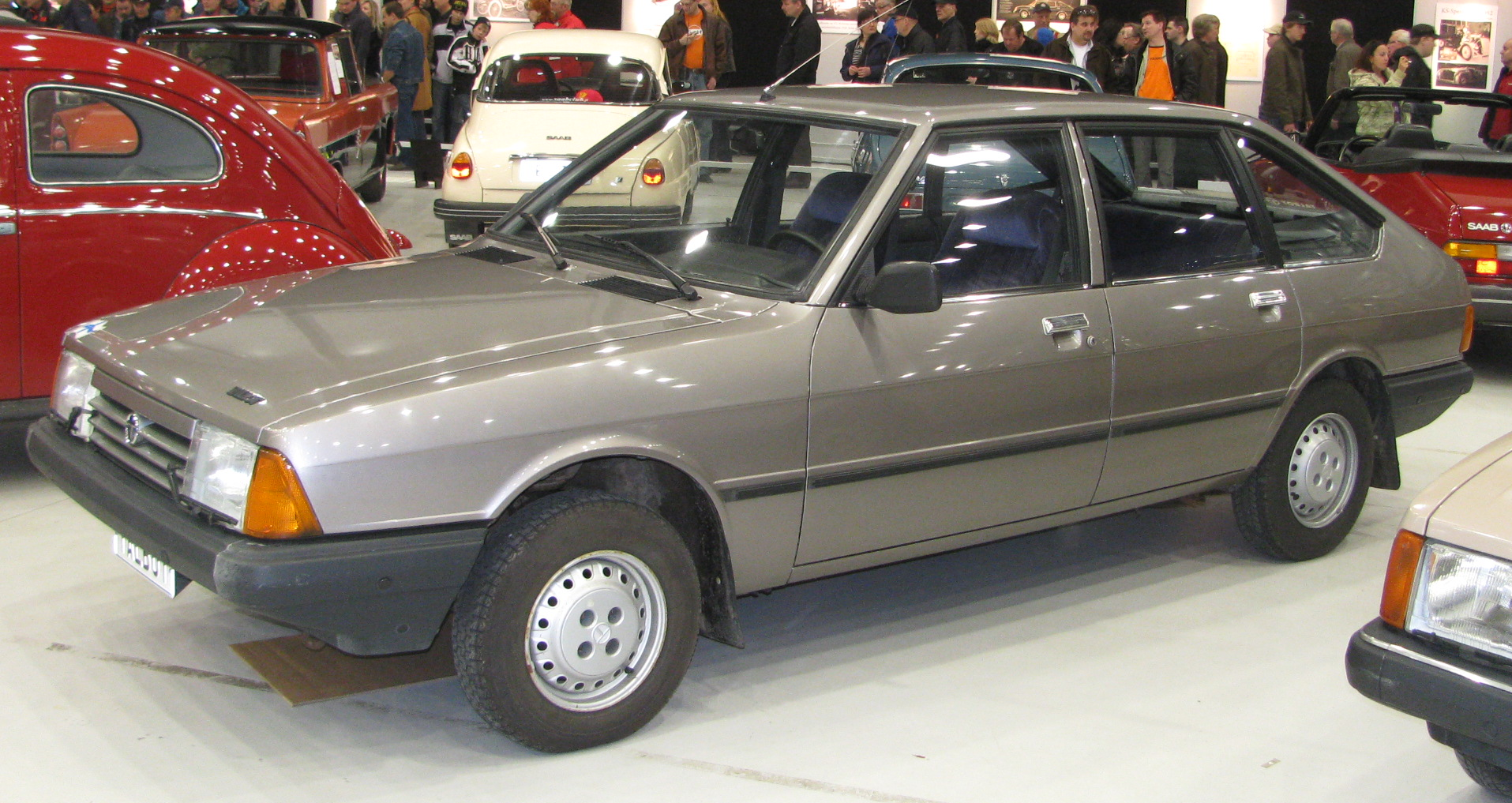
Finnish-built Talbot 1510, facelifted version with new headlights

More upmarket models were designated 1308 (1508 in some markets, reflecting the size of the engine) and 1309 (similarly sold as a 1609 in a few markets). All of the models replaced the Simca 1301/1501 range in France, while on the British market it was sold alongside the ageing Hillman Hunter, a rear-wheel drive range of saloons and estates which would continue until 1979. This type of car was generally more popular in Britain in 1975, with the best-selling cars in this sector being the Ford Cortina and Morris Marina. The Chrysler Alpine was first sold in Britain in January 1976, going on sale just after the similar-sized Vauxhall Cavalier, a rear-wheel drive saloon which consistently outsold it.

Styled by Roy Axe, the Simca 1307, along with the recently introduced Volkswagen Passat, was one of several full-size European family hatchbacks inspired by the Renault 16 that had defined the sector back in 1965. In the 1970s the most popular mid-size cars in Europe were still traditional sedans like Ford Taunus (Ford Cortina in Britain), Opel Ascona B (Vauxhall Cavalier) and Morris Marina, and indeed it would be the next generations of those competing vehicles (the Ford Sierra and the Ascona C) before the concept became fully accepted in the mainstream.

Near the end of the original model's run, the Italian importer marketed a sporty and luxurious version of the bigger-engined 1308 GT. Called the "1308 GLS Superstrada", it featured alloy wheels, black stripes along the lower flanks, and all chrome (aside from the pentastar logo) was blacked out.

=== Facelift and Solara ===
For 1980 the car, which was now sold under the Talbot-brand, received an extensive facelift. The new model, shown at the Frankfurt Show, was known as the Talbot 1510 (the Talbot Alpine name was used in the UK). It received new front and rear lights and the new top of the range SX featured alloy wheels, cruise control, headlamp wash/wipe, power steering and trip computer. Automatic transmission and a five-speed gearbox also became available. The lineup became clearer, with the 1307 GLS replaced by the 1510 LS, the 1307 S by the GL, the 1308 GT by the GLS, and finally the 1309 SX by the 1510 SX (automatic transmission only at first).

A four-door saloon version, called the Talbot Solara, was released in the same year, with either 1.3 or 1.6 engines, and was produced alongside the hatchback version. Trim levels were similar to the Alpine. It effectively took over from the Hunter, axed a year earlier, as the four-door large family saloon in the range. In the Benelux countries, a well-equipped "Ultra" special edition with metallic paint, alloy wheels, and velour interior appeared in December 1983.

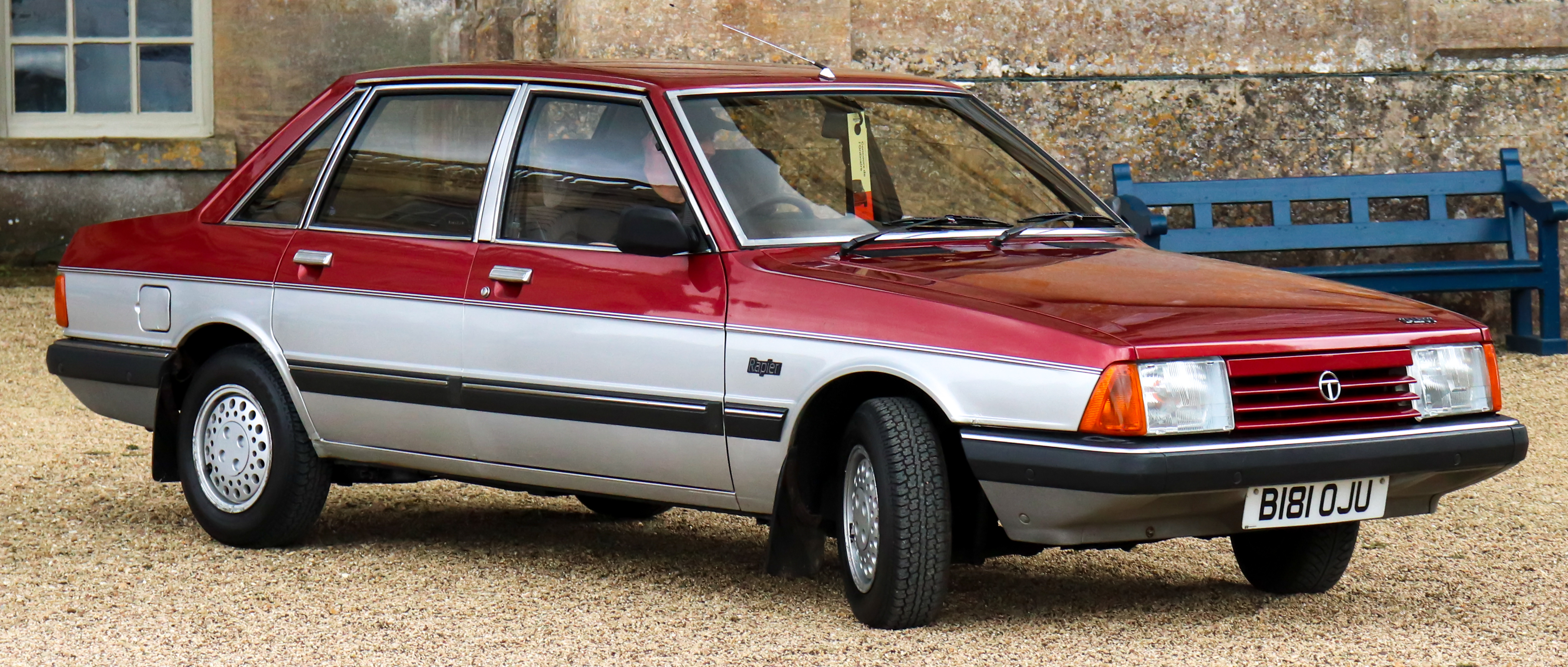

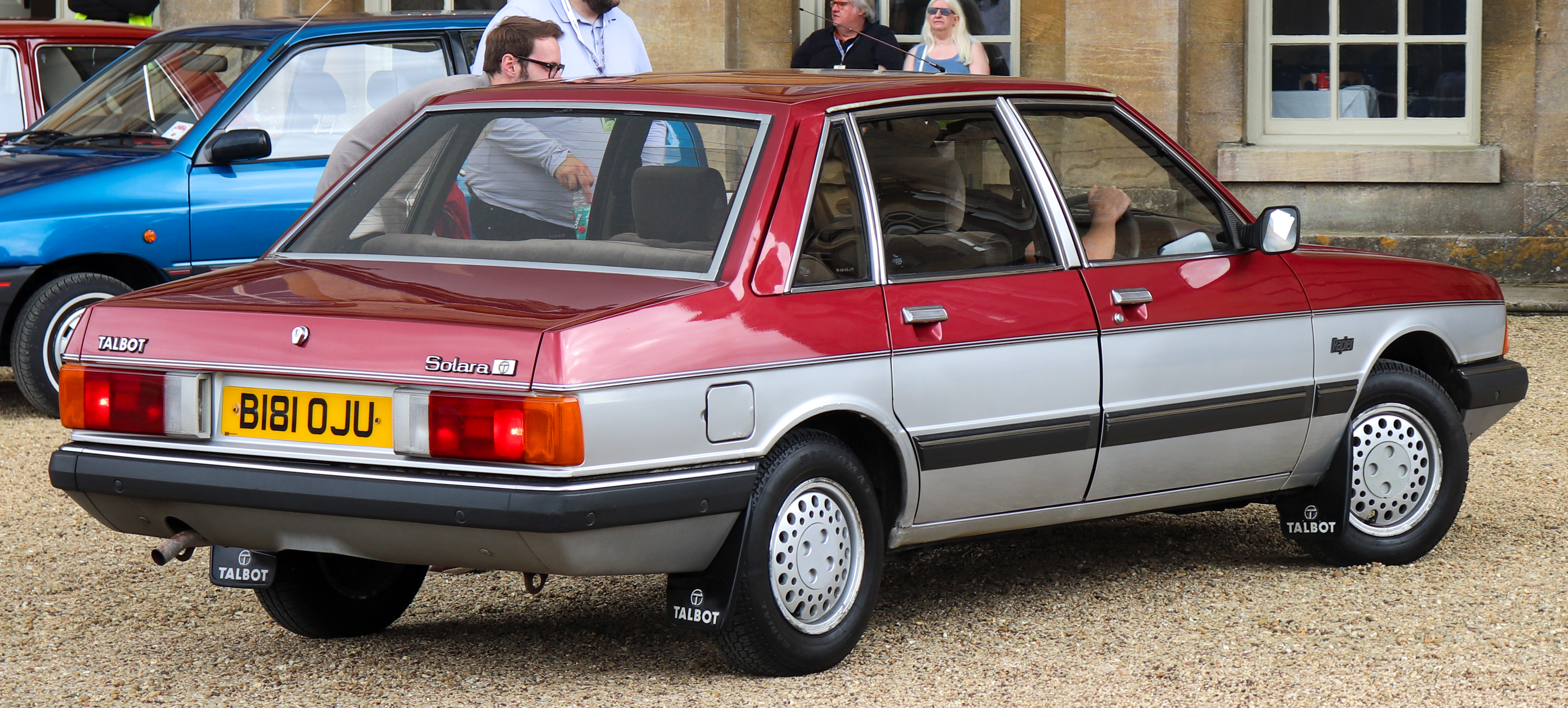
1985 Talbot Solara Rapier

French manufacturing of 1510, Alpine and Solara, along with the smaller Horizon, ended in 1986. In the United Kingdom, the last cars were only available in two trim levels, suffixed either as the Minx for the basic model, or as the Rapier. These names were sourced from the corporate ancestor of Chrysler Europe, the Rootes Group, having been used on the Hillman Minx and Sunbeam Rapier. Production of the Alpine, Solara and Horizon models had already finished at Ryton in the autumn of 1985 to make way for the Peugeot 309, and supply of these final Solara and Alpine models was limited, with the Talbot marque being shelved soon afterwards on all passenger vehicles. Thus, the Alpine/1510/Solara series was not directly replaced; however, the Citroën BX (already released in 1982) and the forthcoming Peugeot 405 (launched in late 1987) were effectively its de facto successors as PSA's entries in the D-segment. Both of these cars were very successful in Europe and helped Citroën and Peugeot increase their market share in the UK and many other export markets.

In early 1985, with the end of production nearing, Finnish assemblers Saab-Valmet began offering the Talbot 1510 GLD, using PSA's 1.9-liter XUD9 diesel engine with 65 PS (48 kW). This was the only diesel-engined version of the Simca 1307 ever offered; PSA's Spanish branch had worked on such a model but work was never completed due to internal competition from the 305 and BX. Valmet did not offer the Solara with the diesel engine so as to avoid competing in-house with the 305 Diesel, as they were both saloons.

Whilst the 1307 sold in big numbers in France, the Chrysler Alpine did not fulfil its potential in the UK, initially losing out to contemporaries such as the Ford Cortina/Sierra and the Vauxhall Cavalier primarily due to the lack of larger engines (Ford and Vauxhall offered 2.0L engines in their products, whilst the Alpine/Solara range topped out at a 1.6L unit). The Alpine's OHV Simca engines were particularly "tappety" and unrefined compared to the more modern overhead camshaft units of its rivals which further dented its appeal. In more recent years, due to corrosion problems similar to those of the Horizon few Alpines have survived in the UK. As of 2017, there were only 19 examples (including the later Talbot-badged versions) still licensed on British roads. However, the car has fared better in its native France, where it still has a cult following among Simca enthusiasts and many hundreds are still in service.

The body styling of the Simca 1307 was the direct inspiration for the design of Russian AZLK-2141 / 2142 / 2335 Moskvitch (export name: Aleko) (1986–2001)

== Manufacture ==
The car was originally manufactured at the Poissy plant in France, at the Ryton plant in the West Midlands, United Kingdom, from 1977 in Villaverde by Barreiros, a subsidiary of Chrysler Europe in Spain, and assembled from CKD kits by Todd Motors (later Mitsubishi Motors NZ) in New Zealand between 1977 and 1984. It was also assembled in Colombia as Dodge Alpine between 1978 and 1982 at the Chrysler Colmotores plant in Bogotá. Between 1979 and 1985 the car was also built by Saab-Valmet in Uusikaupunki factory in Finland. Saab-Valmet was only interested in building the smaller Horizon, but Simca-Talbot would only license that car if Valmet also agreed to assemble the larger 1307. The Finnish-made cars gradually introduced some local changes, including the option of a diesel engine, and featured many Saab interior parts. The most visible Saab-parts were the seats, which began to use Saab's internal structure at the time that the Talbot name replaced Simca. This change also allowed for the fitment of a heated driver's seat, which was not originally available. Talbot did not allow Valmet to export any Finnish-built cars; they were only meant for local sales.

In New Zealand, Chrysler, Talbot, Alpine, and 1510 badges were used on the car during its lifetime, though it was officially in price lists as an Alpine, following the UK convention. In 1982 the car was facelifted and renamed "Talbot SX" there.
