= MG EX-E =

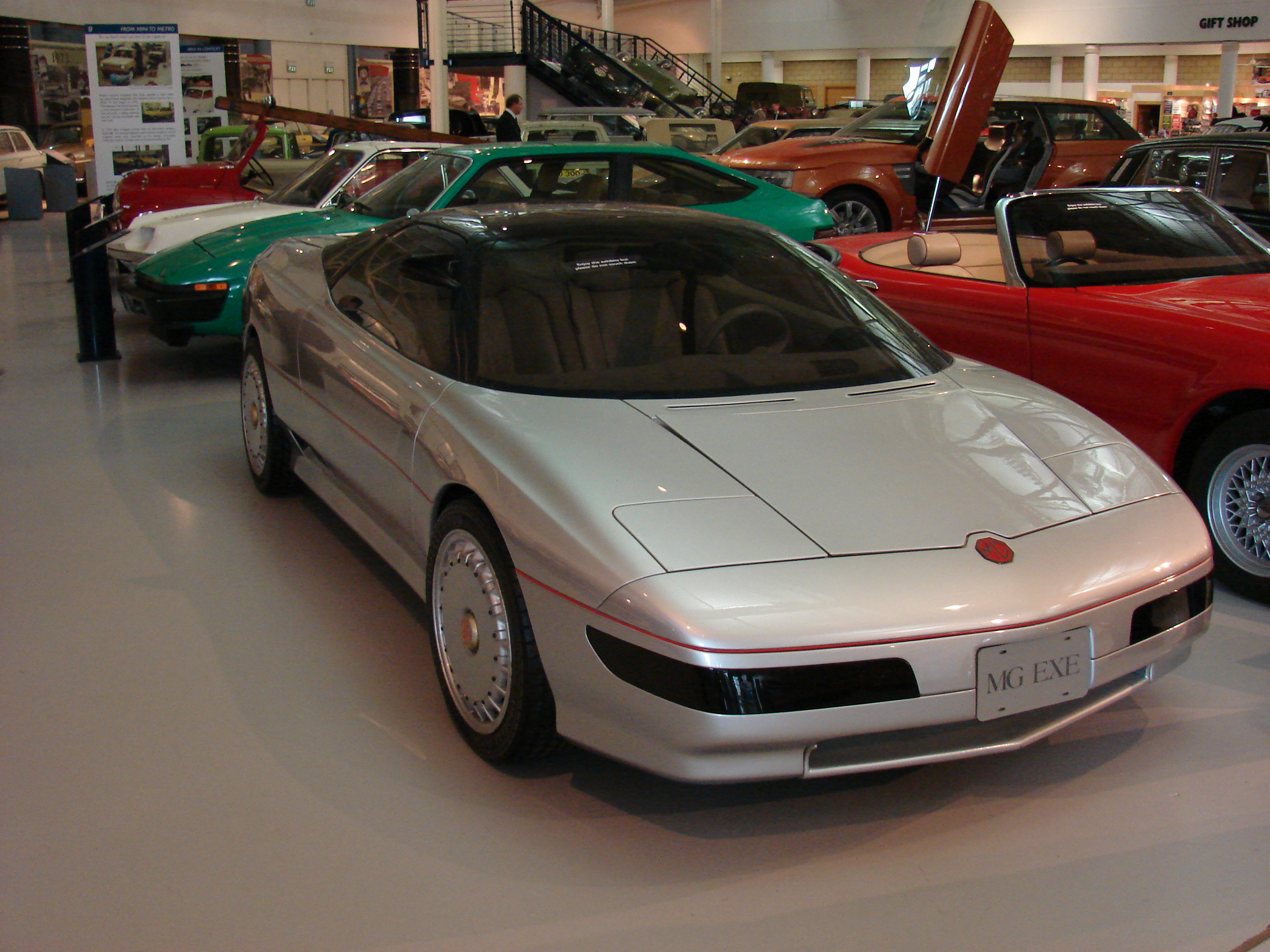

Overview
- Manufacturer: MG (Austin Rover Group)
- Production: 1985
- Designer: Roy Axe; Gerry McGovern

Body and chassis
- Class: Sports car
- Body style: Coupé
- Layout: M4 layout

Powertrain
- Engine: 3.0L DOHC V6, 250 hp
- Transmission: 5-speed manual

The MG EX-E is a concept car that was produced by MG and presented at the Frankfurt Motor Show in 1985. The EX-E was a mid-engined sports car inspired by the Ferrari 308 and designed by Roy Axe and Gerry McGovern. The car's drivetrain and chassis were derived from the mid-engined MG Metro 6R4 rally car. The EX-E concept car did not lead to a production version, although Gerry McGovern did go on to style the later, smaller MG F sports car, which did contain subtle references to the EX-E in some areas of its design, most visibly its rear fascia and lamp clusters.

It was also thought at the time that the car may presage a coupè version of the Rover 800 series which was a few months away from launch at the time of the EX-E's unveiling, however a more conventionally styled coupè version of the 800 would not appear until 1992.

The car is now preserved in the British Motor Museum, Gaydon.

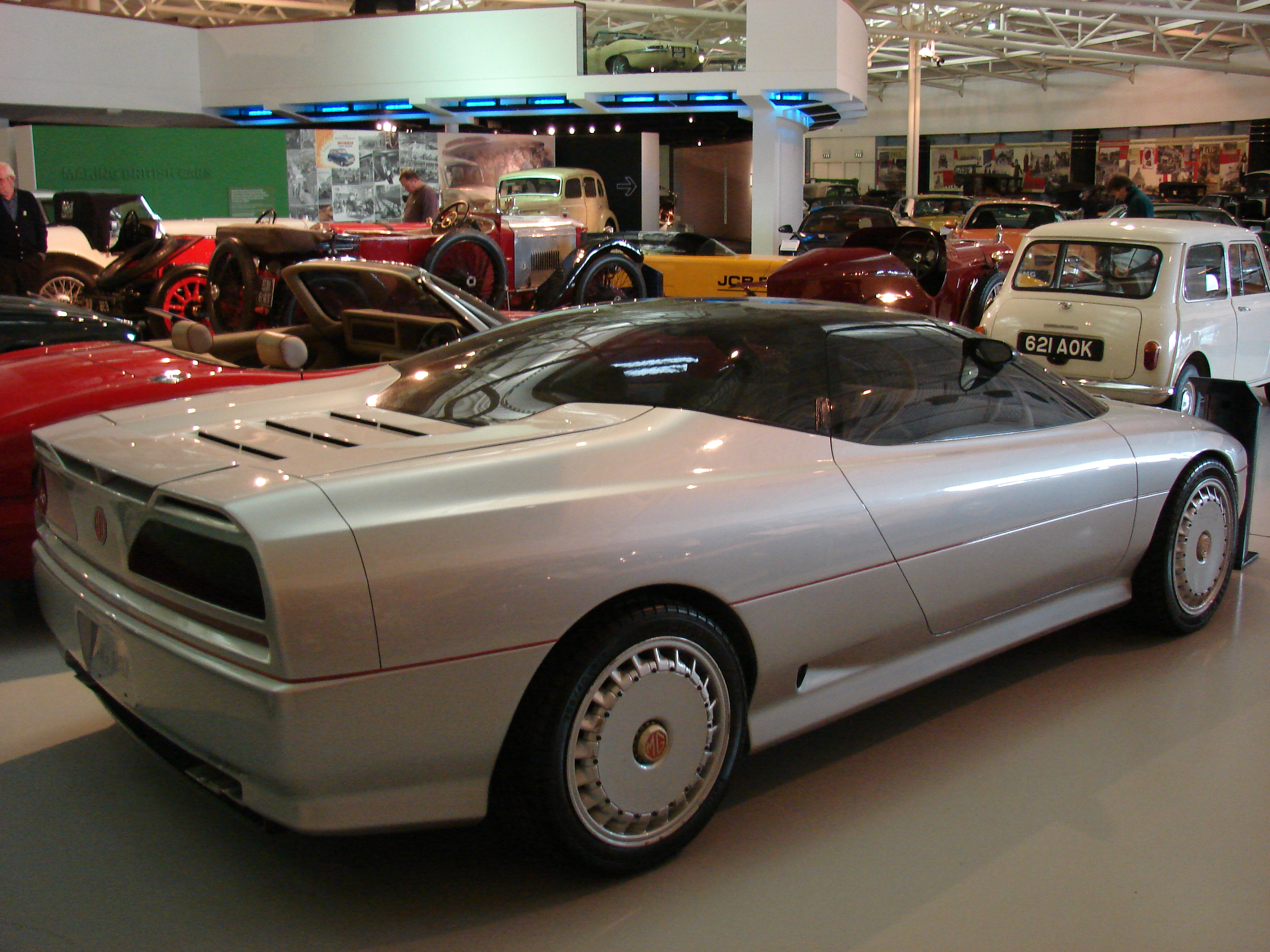
Rear
