= TS3 =

TS3 may refer to:

- Commer TS3, a diesel engine
- The Sims 3, a 2009 simulation video game
- Toy Story 3, a 2010 American 3D film
- TeamSpeak 3
