= Karrier =

British commercial vehicle manufacturer

Karrier Motors Limited
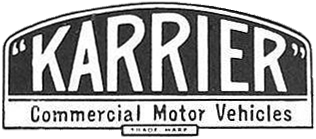
- Type: Subsidiary (1934–79)
- Industry: Automotive
- Founded: 1908
- Defunct: 1979; 47 years ago
- Fate: Purchased by Commer (Rootes Group) in 1934
- Successor: Dodge (Chrysler)
- Headquarters: Huddersfield, England; Luton, England
- Key people: Herbert Clayton, (founder); Reginald Clayton
- Products: Commercial vehicles; Medium goods vehicles; light goods vehicles; municipal cleansing equipment; trolleybuses; fire appliances; mechanical horses
- Parent: Commer (Rootes Group) (1934–70); Chrysler UK (1970–79); Peugeot

Karrier was a British marque of motorised municipal appliances and light commercial vehicles and trolleybuses manufactured at Karrier Works, Huddersfield, West Yorkshire, by Clayton and Co. (Huddersfield) Limited. They began making Karrier motor vehicles in 1908 in Queen Street South, Huddersfield. In 1920, H.F. Clayton sold Clayton and Co's Huddersfield business into public listed company Karrier Motors while keeping their Penistone operation separate. Mechanical and electrical engineers Clayton & Co Penistone, remain active in 2020 as Clayton Penistone Group.

Karrier produced buses as well as their other municipal vehicles and in latter years, especially during the Second World War, Trolleybuses, notably their Karrier 'W' model.

In 1934 Karrier became part of the Rootes Group where it retained its brand identity though the business was operated as part of Rootes's Commer commercial vehicle operation. The Karrier name began to disappear from products when Chrysler bought Rootes in 1967. It was finally dropped in the early 1970s.

== Ownership ==
=== Clayton and Co ===
Herbert Fitzroy Clayton (1857–1935), a prosperous chemicals manufacturer or drysalter and dyer, incorporated in December 1904 a company, Clayton & Co Huddersfield Limited, to own the engineering business he had carried on independently since 1899 (Note: Electrical engineers, Fog-signal manufacturers, Mechanics and Engineers at Penistone and at Milnsbridge near Huddersfield Yorkshire Clayton & Co Huddersfield Limited formed 16 December 1904) when he had left his Dixon Clayton & Co partnership. In 1908, joined by his second son, Reginald Fitzroy Clayton MIAE (1885–1964), Clayton & Co began designing and making Karrier petrol driven motor vehicles and charabancs which became their main business. In 1920, keeping Clayton & Co Penistone separate and retaining control of this new company, Clayton & Co Huddersfield was sold to a newly incorporated public listed company which they named Karrier Motors Limited. At this time the products had been:

Karrier motor lorries vans and wagons and motor charabancs
Fog signalling machines and detonators, Clayton Certainty Railway Fog Signal, (manufactured at Huddersfield, 68 Victoria Street, London SW1 and Westhorpe, Penistone, Yorkshire) which remained with Clayton & Co Penistone
Patents for and to manufacture the (yet to go into production) Karrier Combined Motor Roadsweeper, Sprinkler and Refuse Collector providing sanitary street cleansing in an economical manner

Karrier Motors Limited

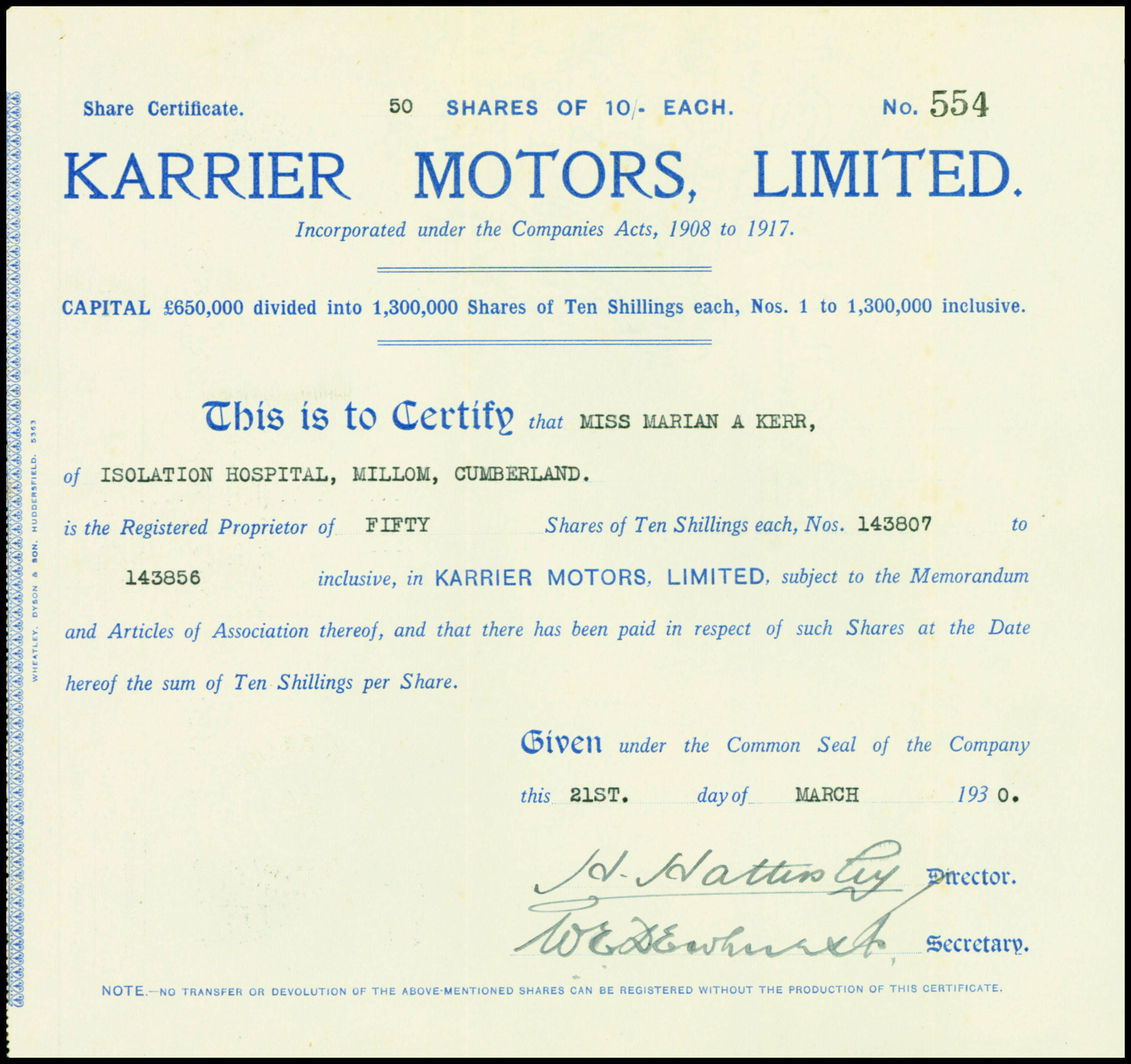
Share certificate of Karrier Motors Ltd, issued 21 March 1930

Karrier experienced financial difficulties and suffered substantial losses in the late 1920s.

A plan to amalgamate T.S. Motors Limited (Tilling-Stevens) with Karrier agreed in August 1932 was dropped a month later without explanation. The following August 1933 Karrier tardily announced that under difficult trading conditions they had made a substantial loss during that 1932 calendar year. At the beginning of June 1934 Karrier was put into receivership though it was also announced that business would continue while "negotiations" were completed. It was bought by Rootes.

=== Rootes Group ===
Rootes Securities, through its partly-owned subsidiaries, acquired Karrier in August 1934 when employee numbers had fallen to 700. Rootes closed the Huddersfield operation and moved production to Commer's Luton works but trolley-bus manufacture was moved to Moorfield Works, Wolverhampton where the same Karrier designs were to be built alongside Sunbeam Commercial Vehicles' trolley-buses. Tilling Stevens would eventually join the Rootes Group in 1950.

Dodge (UK)

Dodge Brothers, then a leading builder of light trucks in USA, in 1922 began to bring knocked-down kits for assembly in Park Royal, London. Dodge Brothers became a Chrysler subsidiary in 1928 and truck production moved to Chrysler's car plant at Kew. Dodges built there were known as "Dodge Kews" and the (partly Canadian sourced) American model cars built beside them, "Chrysler Kews". During the Second World War this Chrysler factory was part of London Aircraft Production Group and built Handley Page Halifax aircraft assemblies. Dodge (some vehicles badged Fargo or De Soto) truck production was merged with Commer and Karrier at Dunstable in 1965. The Public Record Office is now on the site of the Chrysler plant.

=== Chrysler Europe ===
By 1970, the Rootes Group had been taken over (in stages) by Chrysler Europe, with support from the British Government which was desperate to support the ailing British motor industry. The Dodge brand (also used by Chrysler in the USA) began to take precedence on all commercial models. The last vestige of Karrier was probably in the Dodge 50 Series, which began life badged as a (Chrysler) Dodge but with a Karrier Motor Company VIN (vehicle identification number) plate.

=== Peugeot and Renault ===
Chrysler eventually withdrew from UK operations, selling the business to Peugeot. The new owner had little interest in heavy trucks and the factory was then run in conjunction with Renault Véhicules Industriels, (then part of Renault though now Volvo). The combined company used the name Karrier Motors Ltd.

The Karrier trademark is still in the possession of Peugeot, and it is not uncommon for vehicle marques to be reinstated.

== Products ==
=== Early trucks ===
From the outset the Karrier vehicles used J. Tylor and Sons engines. One characteristic of the early Karrier trucks was their preference to have the engine under the footboards, thereby giving a larger proportion of the length of the vehicle over to the load bed. However in a report of 1910 they had just launched a 25cwt truck with conventional bonneted layout. In 1913 Clayton built a truck according to WD guidelines and were successful in getting it certified under the War Office Subsidy Scheme. The scheme was aimed at having vehicles in civilian use that were fit for immediate use by the military in time of war. When the war began in mid-1914 the manufacturers of certified vehicles were in a good position to supply vehicles direct to the war department, and Karrier produced their "subsidy" 3–4 ton B4 truck throughout the war. At the end of the war they continued the 3-4 ton model and added 5-ton chain driven model (the B110).

In 1920 Karrier announced they had been developing their own engine for some time, and this would now be fitted in all their models. At the 1920 October Commercial vehicle show at Olympia they had their 4 and 5 ton goods models plus a road sweeper and the Karrier "Superb" char-à-banc on display. At the 1921 show they added a three-way tipper truck, and offered their other chassis models with the driver moved forward partly alongside the engine, allowing 2 foot more load bed/passenger space. In 1922 they launched their first small capacity chassis since before the war, the type C for 30cwt load, and type CX for 2 ton load or 14 seat char-à-banc. The 30cwt was certified under the post-WW1 War Department Subsidy Scheme which ran from 1922 to 1935.

=== Light tractor units ===
Colt

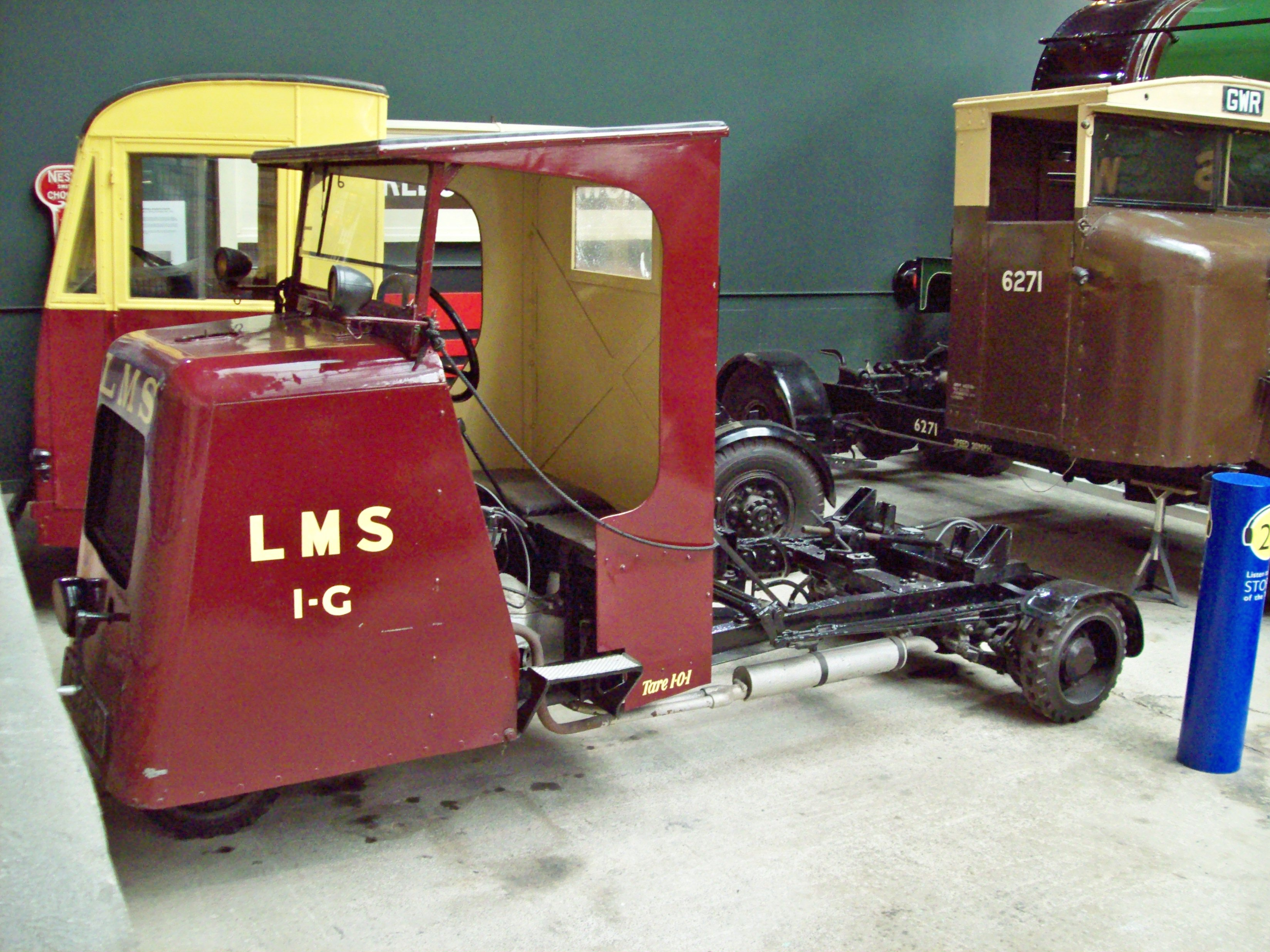
Cob, National Rail Museum, York

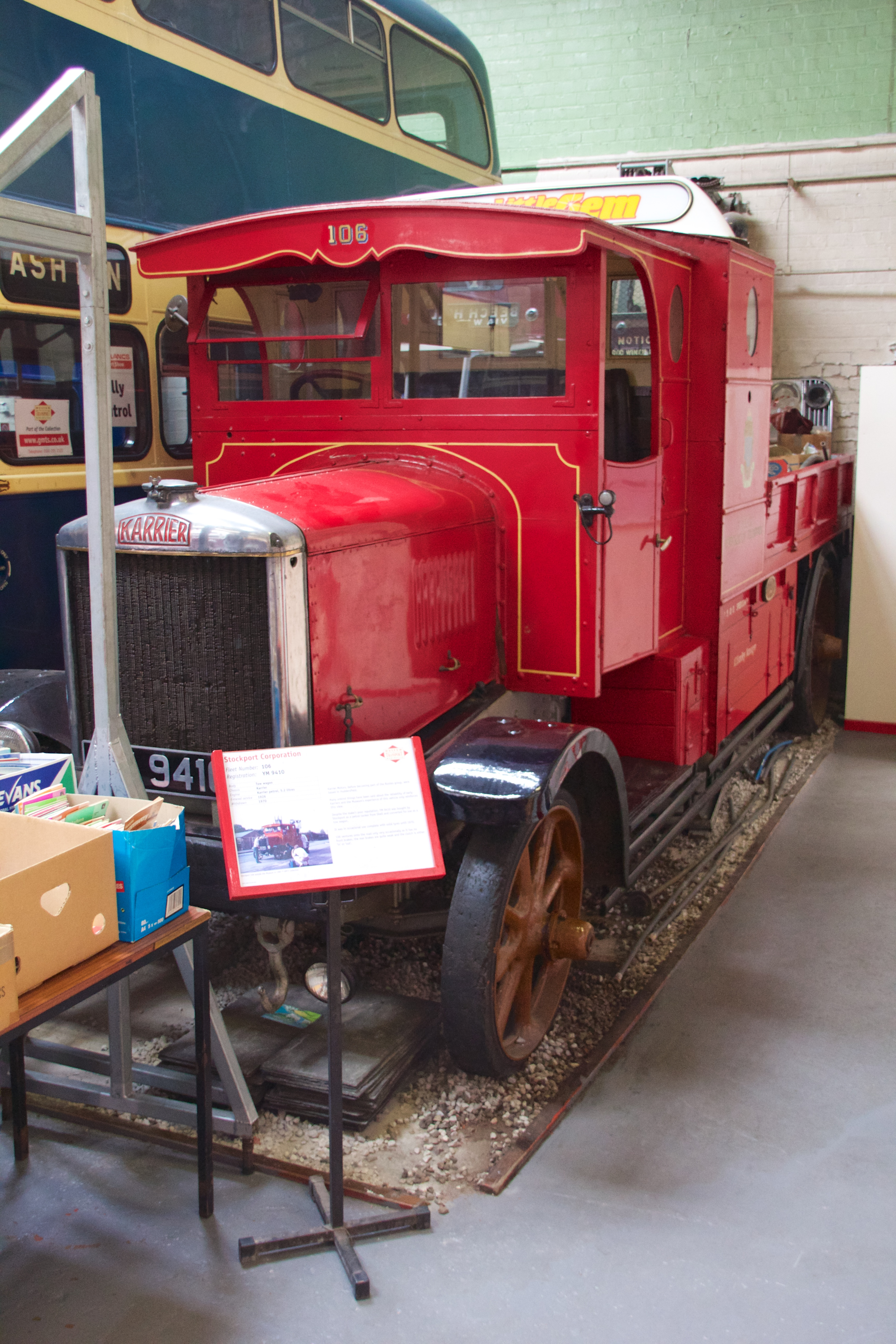
Stockport Corporation recovery vehicle—in service 1926–1970

In 1929, Karrier started production of the "Colt" three-wheeler as a dustcart chassis for Huddersfield Corporation. In 1930, this was developed into the "Cob" tractor to haul road trailers for the London, Midland and Scottish Railway.

Later, in 1933, Scammell produced their own, Napier designed, Scammell Mechanical Horse.

In the mid-1930s, the "Cob" range was supplemented by the four-wheel "Bantam".

Cob

Described by newspapers, quoting Karrier, in 1930 as a "mechanical horse" the small "Cob" tractor was designed by J Shearman, road motor engineer for London, Midland and Scottish Railway. Its small wheels let it turn in confined spaces and manoeuvre more easily in traffic. The front wheels are lifted from the ground when the tractor is attached and it was then classed as an articulated vehicle. It was capable of pulling a three-ton load at 18 mph and capable of restarting on a gradient of one in eight. Production tractors powered by Jowett engines were displayed on the Karrier stand at Olympia's Motor Transport Show. A Karrier "Cob" Major, a 4-ton three-wheeled tractor, was also displayed.

=== Ro-Railer ===
Karrier's Ro-Railer was a hybrid single decker bus, capable of running on both road and rail, intended for towns and villages distant from a railway. Also designed by J Shearman, road motor engineer to London, Midland and Scottish Railway it was tested by the chairman and board of directors of LM & S in January 1931 by travelling between Redbourn and Hemel Hempstead.

Though it was not a success, Karrier's road railbus looked like a bus and could be changed from road to rail in 2½ to 5 minutes. With a six-cylinder engine and a body by Craven it ran at up to 50 mph. Said to be very rough-riding it ran for 1930–31 on the Stratford-on-Avon and Midland joint line. Finally it became a vehicle used to transport track ballast on the West Highland Line.

=== Trolleybuses ===
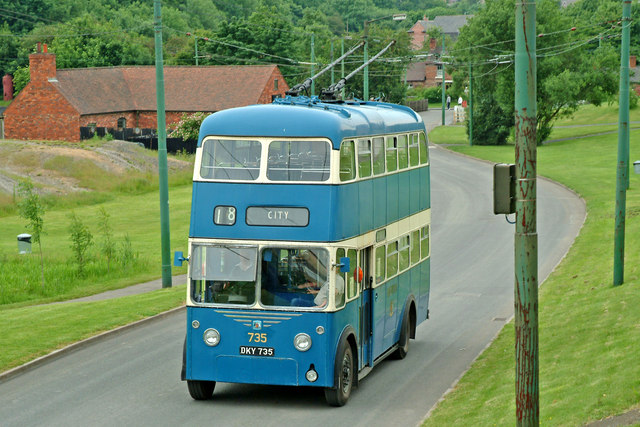
Bradford Trolleybus 735 (1946) at Black Country Living Museum

In 1925, Karrier became the first British manufacturer to produce a three-axle passenger vehicle, aided by the availability of larger pneumatic tyres, and in 1926, entered into an agreement with Clough, Smith & Co. Ltd. to produce the 'Karrier-Clough' trolley-omnibus which Clough would market. This arrangement continued until 1933, when Karrier began marketing the trolleybuses themselves. Despite receiving multiple orders in 1933–4, Karrier went into receivership, leading to the takeover by Humber in 1934, thus becoming part of the Rootes Group. Trolleybus manufacture was moved to Rootes's Sunbeam subsidiary's factory at Wolverhampton, where it continued up until World War II. During the periods in wartime, when production was allowed, only one model was produced, the W4, which could be badged either as Sunbeam or Karrier. Post-war, production continued briefly before the trolleybus portion of the company was sold to Brockhouse in 1946.

=== Rootes Group products ===
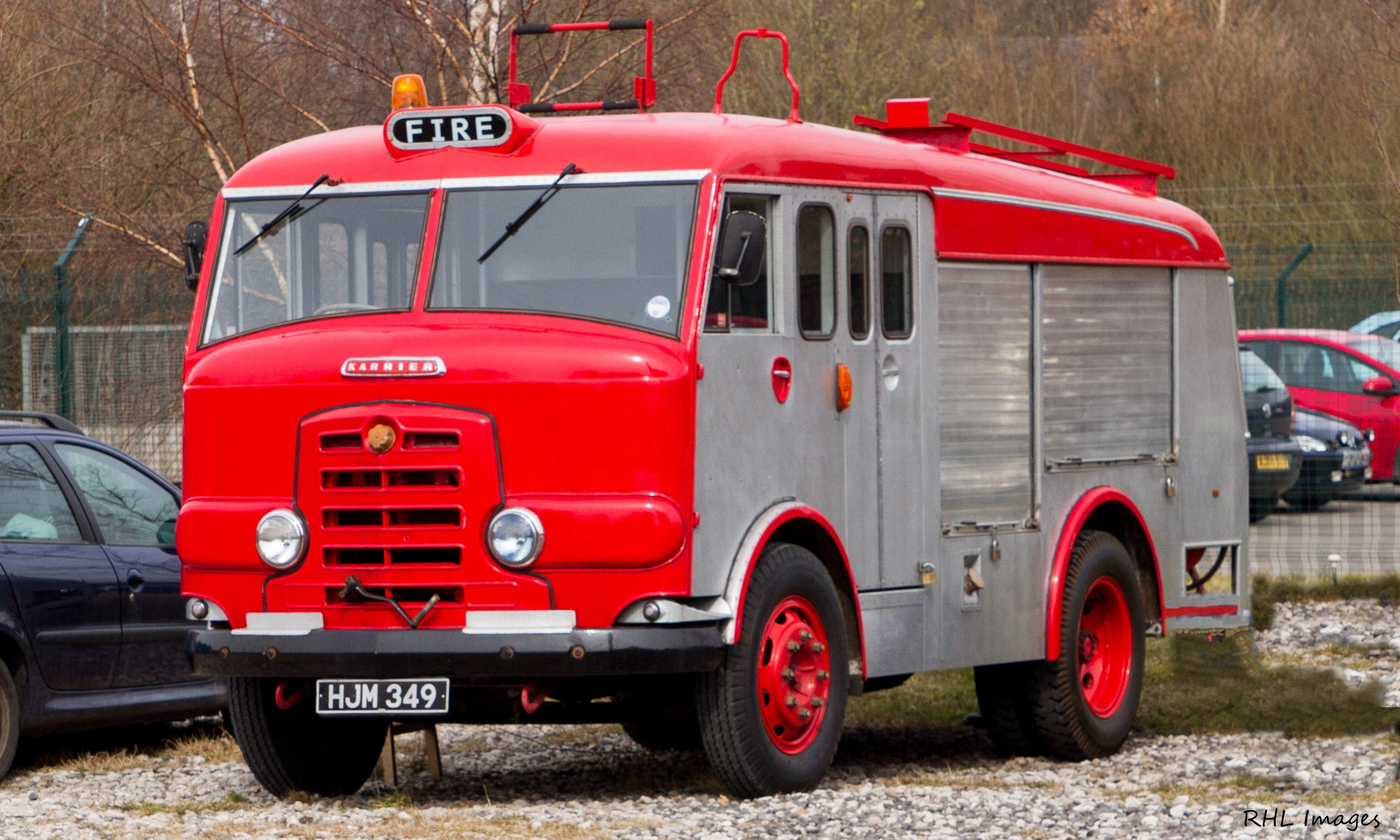
1961 Gamecock water tender

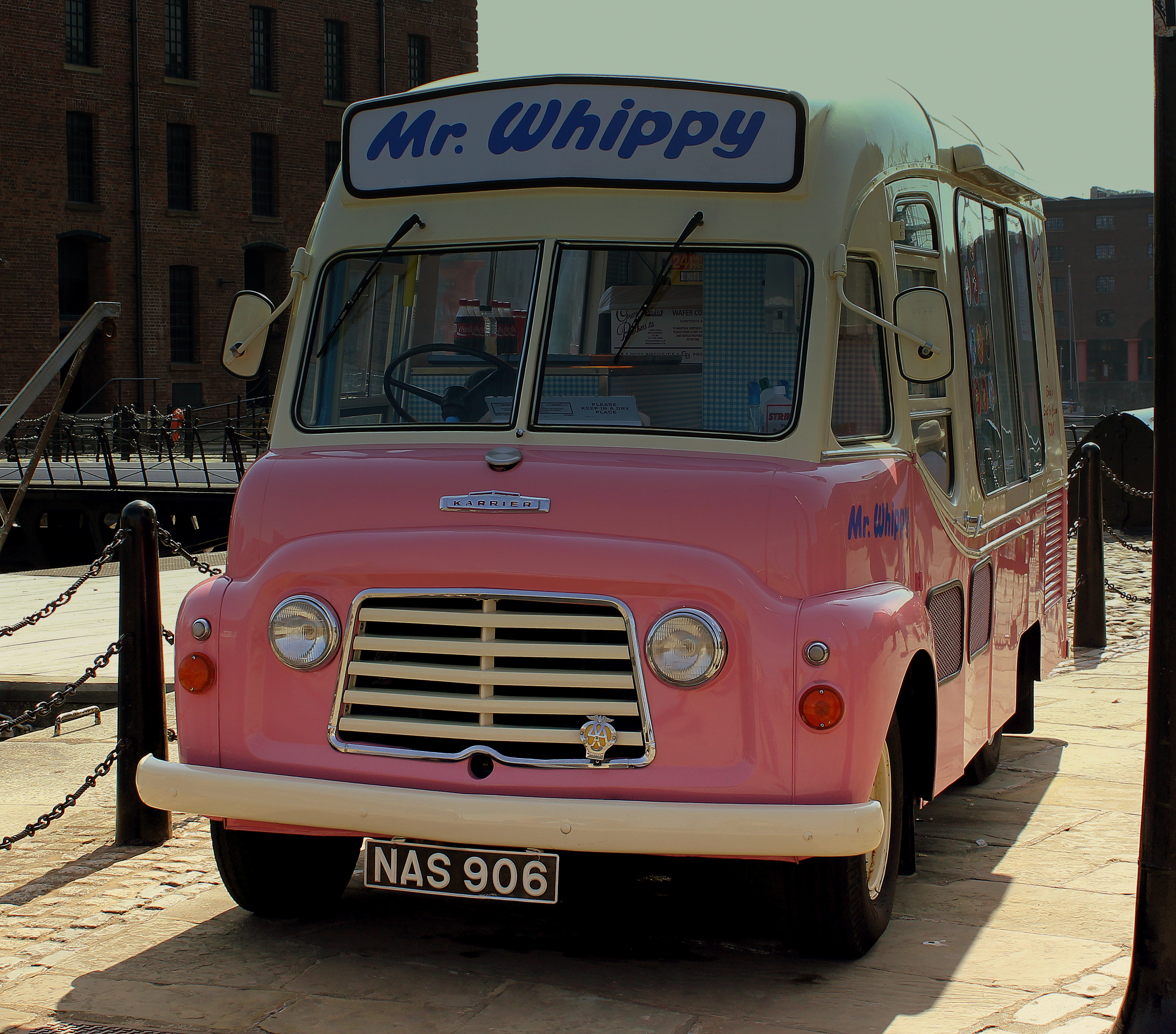
1961 Karrier van; Mr. Whippy ice cream—original at the Albert Dock, Liverpool in 2013

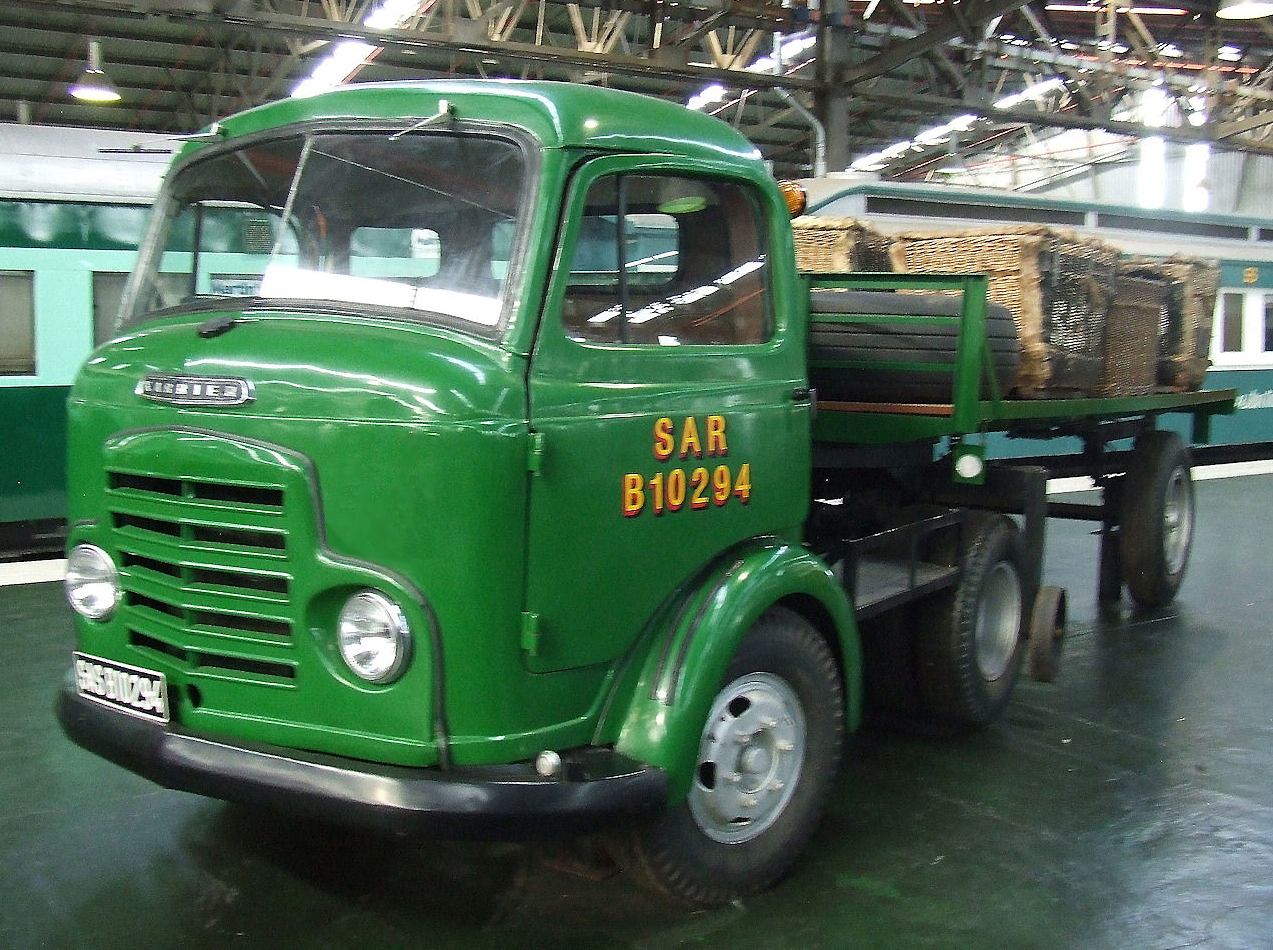
Karrier Bantam c. 1952

In the late 1950s and 1960s some Karrier vehicles were fitted with the Rootes TS3 two-stroke opposed piston diesel engine. Other engines used in this period include Humber Hawk 4-cylinder petrol engines (L-Head and OHC), Humber Super Snipe 6-cylinder (L-Head and OHV) and Perkins Diesels.

At Luton, the only designs carried over from the previous era were the three wheeler and the six-wheel trolleybus chassis.

The trolleybus business became integrated with that of Sunbeam Commercial Vehicles Limited following Sunbeam's purchase by the Rootes group. In 1946 J. Brockhouse and Co Limited of West Bromwich, the engineering group, bought Sunbeam Commercial Vehicles but sold the trolley-bus part of the business to Guy Motors Limited in September 1948.

Under Rootes ownership, Karrier trucks were generally a smaller size than their sister Commer brand, with "Bantam" models using 13-inch wheels – and "Gamecock" models using 16-inch wheels – to give lower loading height. They were designed for local authorities and their varied applications, including highway maintenance tippers, refuse collection vehicles and street lighting maintenance tower wagons. Karrier trucks and chassis were also built for and supplied to airport operators and airlines for baggage handling trucks, water bowsers and toilet servicing.

=== Lorry or bus chassis ===
- A/40-110 cwt type (1908–)
- B/20-110 cwt type (1910–)
- C type (1922–34)
  C 14-seat or 30 cwt (1922, 1924–5)
  CK3 3 ton RSC road sweeper-collector vehicles (c.1937)
  CK6 3 ton RSC road sweeper-collectorvehicles (c.1937)
  CX 40 cwt (1922) public cleansing vehicle
  CY 40 cwt public cleansing vehicle or 20 seat (1924–27)
  CY1 (1925–)
  CY2 40cwt (1928–31) low loader refuse wagon
  Victor 65cwt (1932)
  CY3 hand operated tipper
  CVR 50-65cwt (1930–34) low-loader
  CYR 60 cwt (1934) low loader refuse wagon
  CYS 40 cwt
  CWY 60 cwt (1926–31)
  Protector 75/80cwt (1932–34)
  CL 20/29 seat 60 cwt e.g. Norfolk (1926)
  CY6 50cwt (1926)
  CL4 30, 26, 26/29 seat (1927–29)
  CL6 30 seat (1928)
  CV5 32 seat (1928)
  CV6 6-wheel rigid body, 65 cwt chassis (1926–)
  CL R-6WH 30 seat (1927)
- K (forward control) and SK (side) type (1922–33)
  K1 60/65cwt or 28–45 seat (1922–23)
  SK1 60/65cwt (1922–23)
  K2 70/75/80 cwt (1922–24)
  SK2 70/75/80cwt (1922–24)
  K3 60 cwt or 28–54 seat (1922–25)
  SK3 33/35 seat (1922–25)
  K4 80/90cwt (1922–27)
  SK4 80cwt (1922–25)
  K5 100/110/120 cwt (1922–31)
  SK5 100/110cwt (1922–25)
  Consul 155cwt (1932–34)
  Carrimore 10/12 ton, e.g. on K5 chassis (c.1936)
  KL 30/32 seat 5 ton e.g. Stafford (1926)
  K6 tractor 12 ton (1927–31)
  K7 7 ton (1928–31)
  KW6 8 ton (1929)
  KWR6 8/9 ton (1930–33)
  KWF6 8/10 ton (1930–33)
- J type (1924–29)
  JH 60/65/70 cwt (1924–27)
  JK 30/32 seat 75 cwt e.g. Durham (1926)
  JKL 52 or 32 seat (1927–28)
  JKL FC 32 seat (1929)
- H 18–25 seat or 50 cwt (1922–25)
- Z 20/25 cwt (1925–27)
  ZX 30 cwt or 20 seat, e.g. Devon (1926–29)
  ZX2 24 seat (1927)
- WD 2 ton (1924–26)
- GH4 80/95cwt (1928–33)
  GH5 FC 80/100/120cwt (1929–33)
  Colossus 220/265cwt (1932–34)
  Falcon 3 ton (1934)
  Defender 5 ton (1934)
  Elector 6 ton (1934)
  Autocrat 6 ton (1934) forward drive
  Democrat 5 ton (1934)

=== Bus chassis ===
WL6 6-wheel rigid chassis, 5 ton, 28 passengers single or 54 passengers double deck bus
DD6 various bus models (1929–31)
WO6 various bus models (1929–31)
RM6 100/120cwt (1931–32)
FM6 100/120cwt (1931–34)
TT tractor 12 ton (1931–33)
Cutter 20 seat 4-wheel (1928–32)
Coaster 28 seat 4-wheel (1928–35)
Chaser 4 26/35 seat 4-wheel (1928–32)
Chaser 6 26 seat (1930–5)
Clipper 40 seat 6-wheel (1928–31)
Consort 68 seat 6-wheel (1928–34)
Monitor 50 seat 4-wheel double decker (1929–34)

=== Trolleybus chassis ===
- Trolleybus (1935–)
  EA3 32-4 seat single deck 4-wheel ()
  E4L 326 seat single deck 4-wheel light-eight ()
  E4S 32 seat single deck 4-wheel ()
  E4 56 seat double deck 4-wheel ()
  E6 Clough 60 seat double deck 6-wheel ()
  E6A 70 seat double deck 6-wheel ()
  W4 double deck 4-wheel ()

=== Light goods vehicles ===
- Colt
  Colt 2 ton 3 wheel tractor or RSC (1930–4)
  Colt Major 4 ton 3 wheel tractor (1930–4)
  Colt (1937–39)
- Cob
  Cob 50/60 cwt 3 wheel tractor (c.1930)
  Cob Junior 4 ton 3 wheel tractor or RSC road sweeper-collector (1935-9)
  Cob Major 4 ton 3 wheel tractor
  Cob Senior 6 ton 3 wheel tractor or RSC road sweeper-collector (c.1937)
  Cob Six 6 ton 3 wheel tractor (1934)
- Gamecock
  Gamecock E-series 3–4 ton 6-cylinder (1950–)
  Gamecock 14 seat coach and ambulance (1954–)
  Karrier-Walker 12 seat bus (1958–)
  Karrier-Dennis Ambulance (1962–)
  Ramillies refuse collector (1962–)
  Karrier ice cream van (c.1962)
- Bantam
  Bantam 50cwt (1933–34, 36–40)
  Bantam RSC road sweeper-collector (1933–39)
  Bantam F-series 2–3 ton (1948–63)
  Bantam FA-series 3–5 ton (1948–63)
  Bantam 4–5 ton tractor (1956–)
  Bantam tipper (1958–)
  Bantam FB-series 3 ton (1972–)

== Scale models and die-cast ==
- Meccano Ltd "Dinky Toys"; No. 33a, (production 1935 to 1940), "Mechanical horse", approximately 1:48 scale Several different trailers were available.
- Lesney Products "Matchbox" Series; Nos. 37a & 37b, (production 1956 to 1966), Karrier Bantam 2 Ton "Coca-Cola lorry", approximately 00 scale.
- Lesney Products "Matchbox" Series; No. 38a, (production 1957 to 1963), Karrier Bantam "refuse wagon", approximately 00 scale.
- Corgi produced several models based on the Karrier Bantam between 1957 and 1967, including mobile shops, ice cream vans (some musical) and liveried delivery vans, in approximately O scale (1:44). Corgi also made a model of a Decca mobile radar based on the Gamecock.
- De Agostini Gamecock fire appliance HJM 349 as a water tender, 1:72 (approximately 00 scale).
