= Commer =

British van, lorry and bus manufacturer

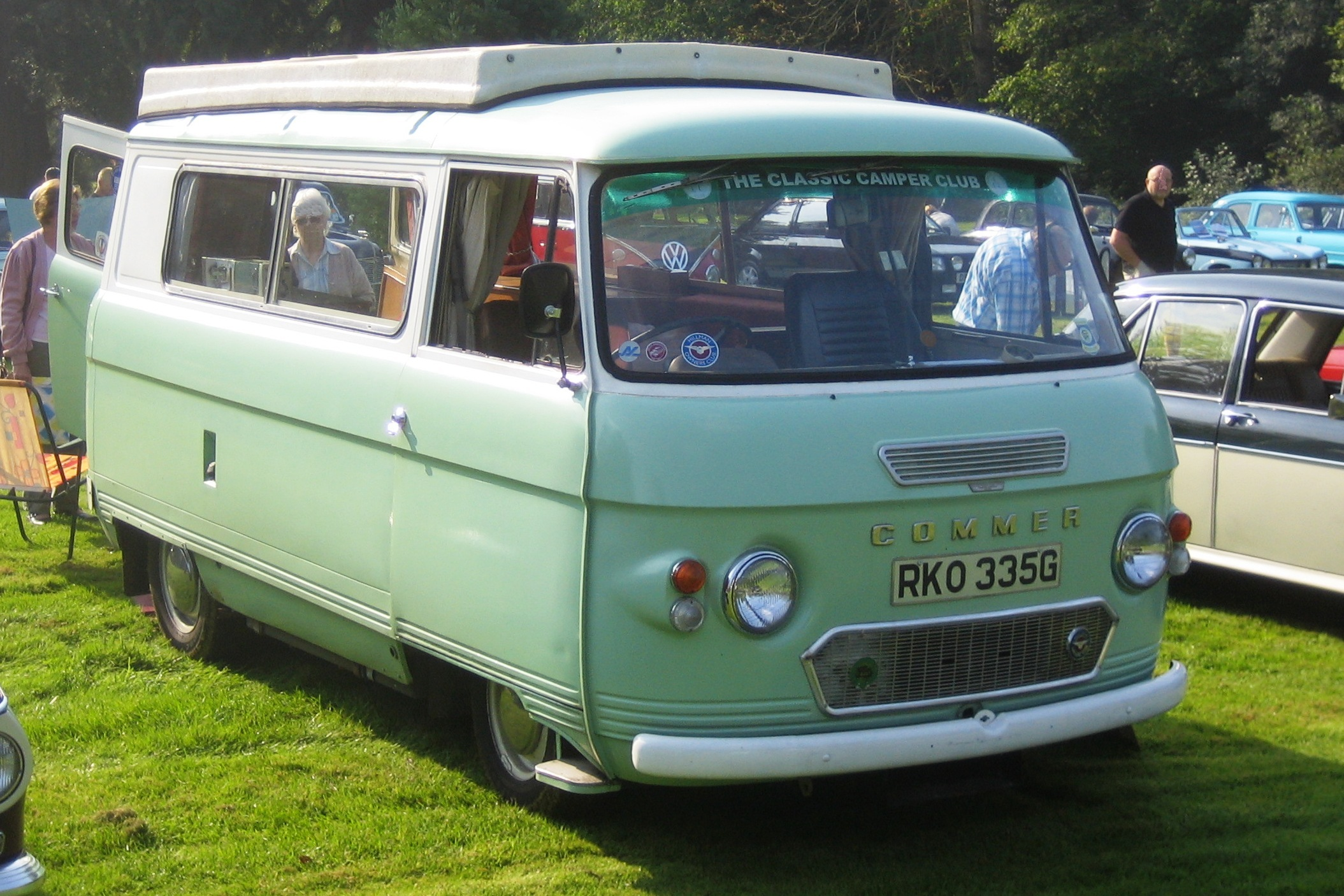
- Commer FC van, c. 1968
- Type: Subsidiary
- Industry: Automotive
- Founded: 1905
- Defunct: 1979; 47 years ago
- Fate: purchased 1967 by Chrysler UK
- Successor: Chrysler UK
- Headquarters: Luton, England
- Products: Commercial and military vehicles
- Parent: Rootes Group (1931–67); Chrysler UK (1967–78); Peugeot (1978–79); Renault Trucks (1979–present)
- Subsidiaries: Karrier

Commer was a British manufacturer of commercial and military vehicles from 1905 until 1979. Commer vehicles included car-derived vans, light vans, medium to heavy commercial trucks, and buses. The company also designed and built some of its own diesel engines for its heavy commercial vehicles.

== History ==
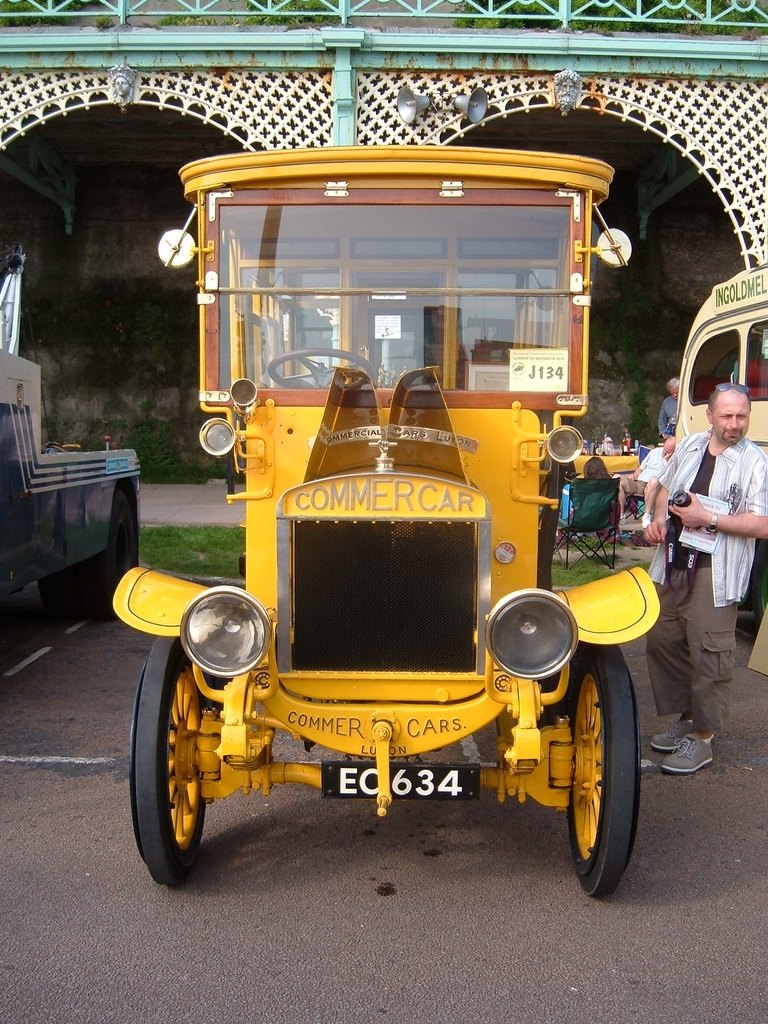
Front of a 1909 Commer bus

Commer Car Truck (1910) In the service of Lipton Tea

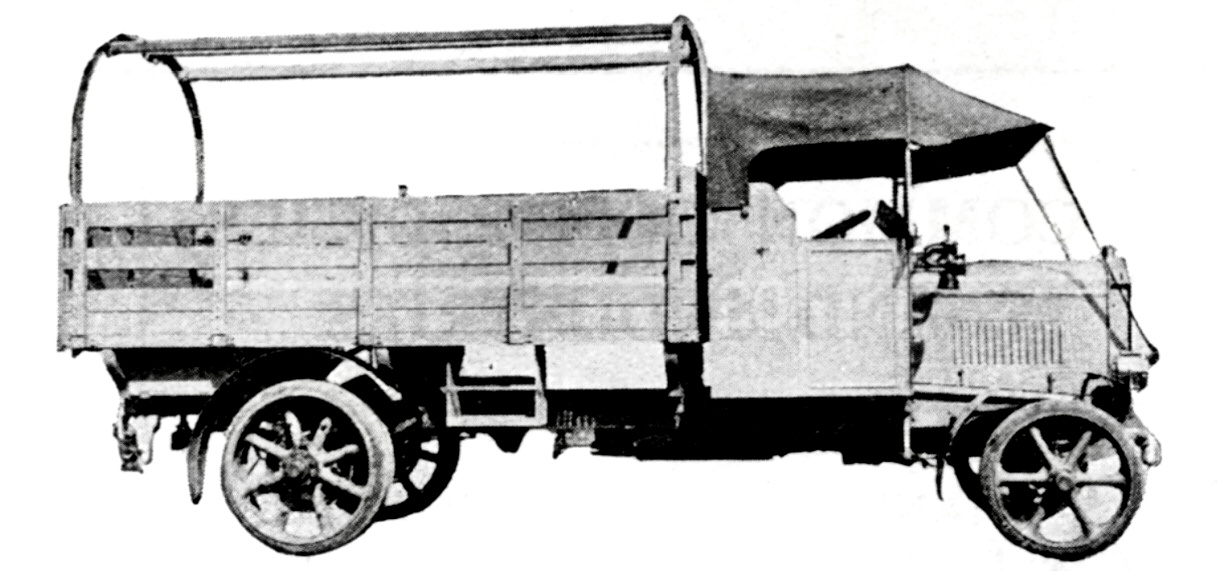
Commer WD Pattern RC (1917)

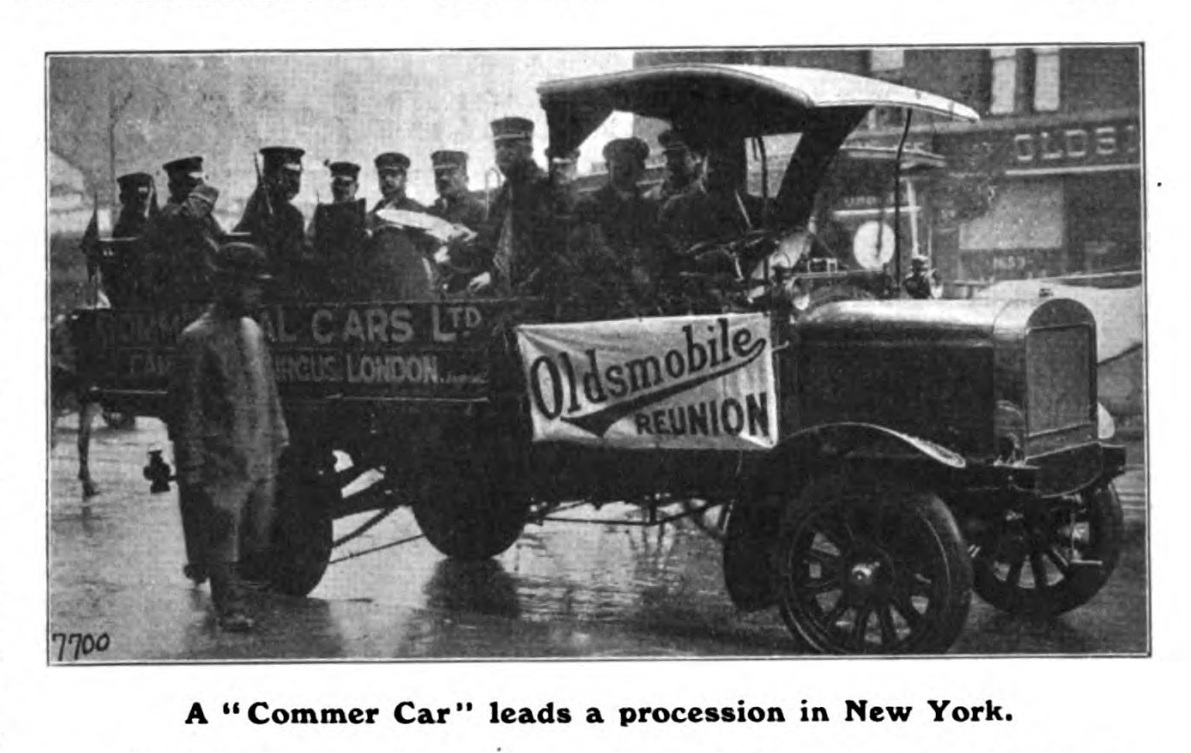
Commer lorry, New York 1910 leading a parade of 400 Oldsmobile cars

This business belonged to Commercial Cars Limited, a company incorporated in September 1905 by directors H. C. B. Underdown, (Note: In 1905, Underdown formed a small syndicate to try out and determine the commercial value of the Lindley automatic change speed gearbox. A four-ton motor lorry using the gearbox was made in a South London workshop and its success led the syndicate into giving birth to Commercial Cars Limited. In October 1917, Underdown was appointed Director of Agricultural Machinery at the Ministry of Munitions and the following biographical notes were published: "Landowner, of 4,000 acres in Norfolk, a Governor of the Royal Agricultural Society, chairman of the commercial vehicle committee of ABRAM, chairman of the general vehicle committee of the SMMT, Director of Direct United States Cable Co, The Trinidad Oilfields, The Sheffield-Simplex Motor Works) barrister and director of Direct United States Cable Co with H. G. Hutchinson a director of Royal Exchange Assurance to manufacture: commercial cars, omnibuses, charabancs, fire engines and every kind of industrial vehicle. In 1920, it was described as the first company to specialise in the manufacture of internal combustion industrial commercial vehicles. In order to go into volume production a site was bought in September 1905 at Biscot Road, Biscot, Luton. Construction of extensive new workshops began on the five-acre site which was mostly complete by late 1906. Commercial Cars became a member of the Society of Motor Manufacturers and Traders in August 1906. It was one of the first manufacturers of commercial vehicles in the United Kingdom, its speciality being the Commer Car.

At Olympia's Commercial Motor Show in March 1907, Commer exhibited a motor-bus chassis with a 30–36 horsepower engine and a gearbox invented by Mr Linley, the works manager. (Note: "The new change speed gear(box) invented by Mr Lindley has its spur wheels in constant mesh and separate gears are engaged by a series of dog clutches. It is impossible to damage the gears when changing their ratios. A change is preselected and engaged by "disengaging the drive for an instant") Dog-clutches made the change rather than the spur wheels which remained in constant mesh. As well as the bus chassis Commer displayed a char-a-banc for thirty passengers and delivery vans being run by a substantial enterprise.

A new "large and powerful" lorry, E43, registration BM 787, took part in the Great Commercial Motor Trials in September 1907. It also had a constant mesh gearbox (Comer (sic) slogan—'dogs which bite with a click'). Unladen weight was (3.7 tonnes) 3 tons 13 cwt, the engine had four-cylinders, its output was 33 horsepower at 800 rpm. It had four forward speeds and was driven by side chains. Length 20 feet (6 metres), width just over (2.1 metres) seven feet and height (1.76 metres) two inches under six feet. The platform was (3.6 metres) twelve feet long. The newspaper noted that a Commercars "chassis" was transporting passengers at Widnes.

Production of the first truck, the 3-ton RC type started in 1907. This was later modernized into the SC and so on through the YC range, which was also known as the "Barnet" series of trucks. Their first bus was made in 1909. With the outbreak of the First World War the factory turned to the manufacture of military vehicles for the British Army, and by 1919 more than 3,000 had been made.

Though obliged to undergo financial restructure in 1920 in the hope of avoiding creditors, the business was unable to avoid repayment of a debt of £75,000 due to the Treasury, raised in order to pay 60 per cent Excess Profits Duty on wartime activities. Eventually, after agreeing terms with the Receiver in 1925, Commer was bought in 1926 by Humber. In 1931 Humber became a 60-percent-owned subsidiary of the Rootes Group.

The Commer name was replaced by the Dodge name during the 1970s, following the takeover of Rootes by Chrysler Europe. After Peugeot purchased Chrysler Europe in 1978, the Commer factory was run in partnership with the truck division of Renault, Renault Trucks. For some time, it continued to produce the Dodge commercial truck range with Renault badges, and there was a small amount of product development. Eventually, Dodge production was cancelled in favour of mainstream Renault models, and there was a switch to the production of Renault truck and bus engines in the early 1990s.

Many Commer vans and lorries are notable for being fitted with the Rootes TS3 engine, a two-stroke diesel three-cylinder horizontally opposed piston engine, which came to be known as the "Commer Knocker" owing to the distinct noise it produced. Newer Commer vehicles had Perkins and Cummins diesel engines, and, less commonly, Mercedes diesel engines.

== Trucks ==
=== Commer N- and LN-series ===
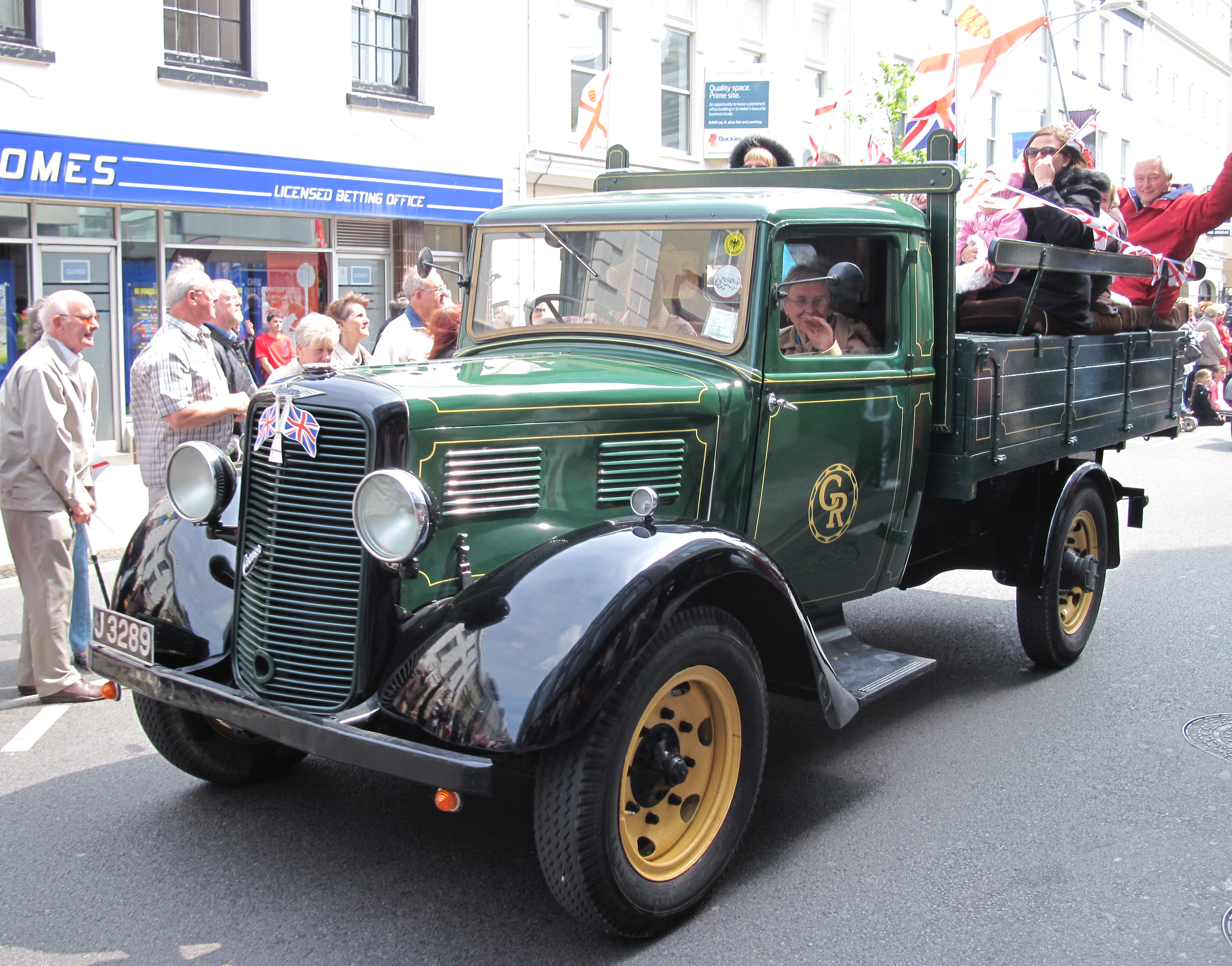
Commer N1

The N-series was introduced in 1935, and was also used by the British armed forces in World War II. Production was halted in 1939 and was not recommenced after the war. Cab-over and bonneted trucks were both available, fitted with petrol or diesel engines. The six-cylinder petrol engine was available in 3,181 cc (194.1 cu in) or 4,086 cc (249.3 cu in) versions. The Perkins Leopard diesel engine was also available.

The range included N as well as the lighter-duty LN range of trucks (numbered N1 through N6 depending on their approximate weight capacities in tons), as well as the PN-series of buses, commonly fitted with diesels. There was also the 4/5 ton PLNF5 introduced in 1938. The LN was officially capable of carrying weights similar to those of the corresponding N-series trucks, but had a lower overall max weight and was "definitely not intended to carry an overload" – a tacit recognition of British truckers' habitual overloading of their trucks. The LN-range was also designed to operate effectively within the 1930s 30 mph speed limit for heavier lorries. After the introduction of the 4/5-ton LN5, the 5 1/2-ton (5,600 kg) N5 was discontinued. However, the market decreed otherwise and the N5's revival was announced in February 1938.

=== Commer Superpoise ===
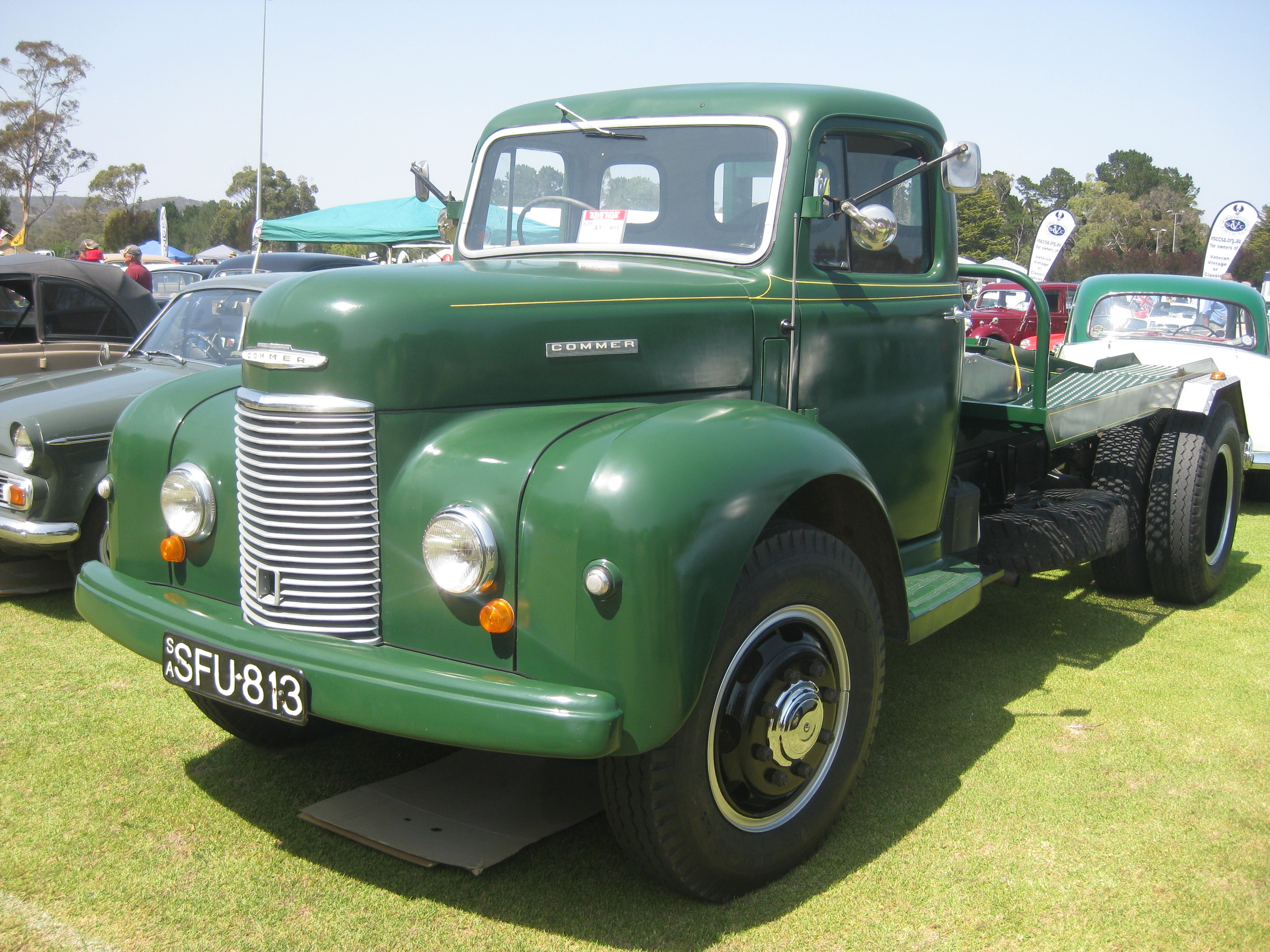
Commer Superpoise of 1955

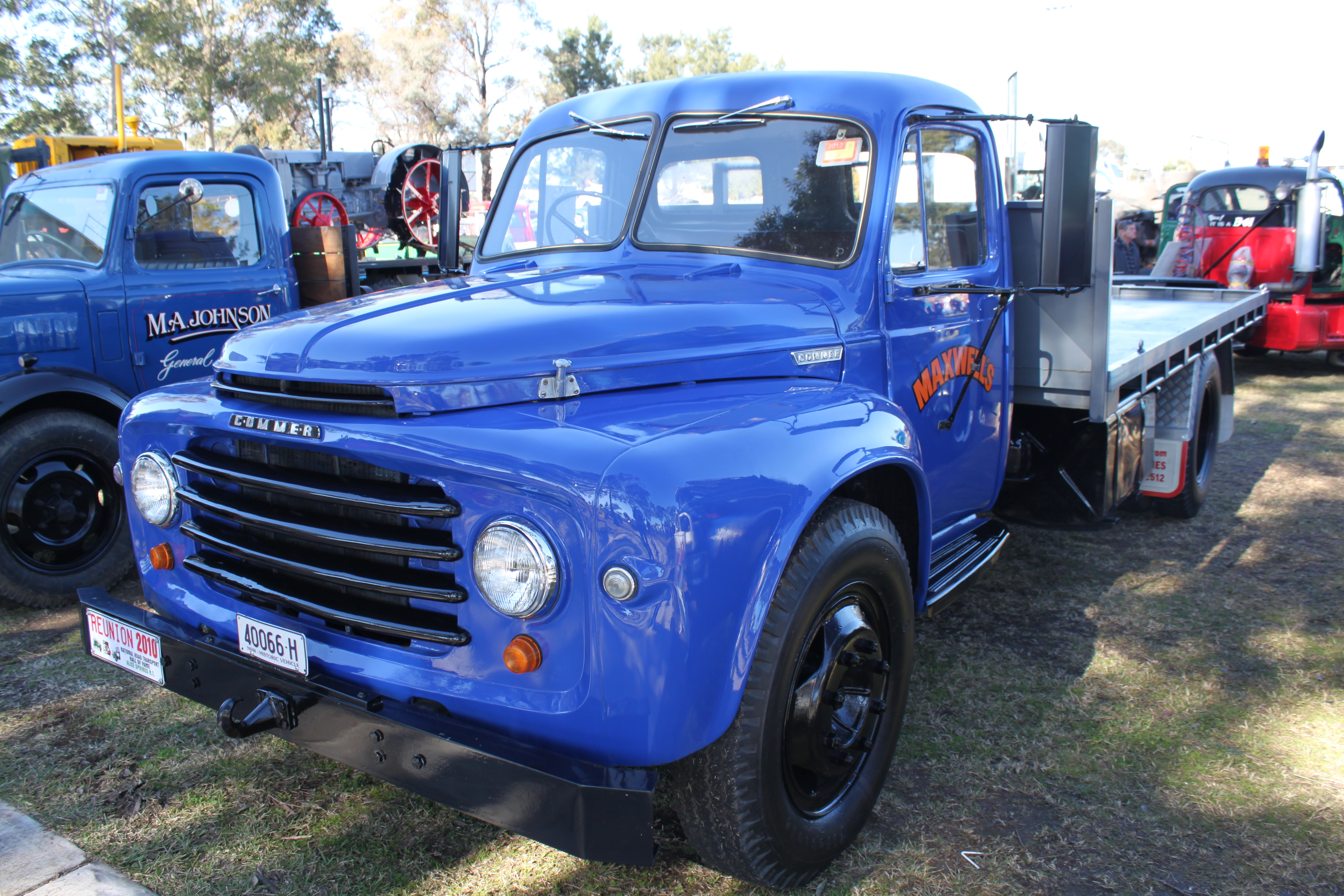
Commer Superpoise of 1957

The Commer Superpoise range (Q-series) was introduced in 1939, with both semi-forward and full-forward control options. These newer models were more streamlined and modern in appearance and adopted an American International-like front end. The line included trucks of 1 1/2 to six tons capacity powered by 6-cylinder petrol or diesel engines. A new Superpoise range (QX-series, although QX had also been used on some earlier Superpoises) with payloads of between two and five tons was introduced in 1955.

The truck proved fairly popular but did not provide fierce competition for products by more known brands such as Leyland and Bedford. Production ended in 1961.

Even though Commer was not purchased by Chrysler until 1967, the British Dodge 200 series (the successor to the Dodge 100 "Kew" trucks) which came out in 1958, had its cab styled by a company called Airflow Streamlines of Northampton after Chrysler contracted them. Airflow Streamlines was coincidentally the same company that styled the 1955 Superpoise, leading to both vehicles using almost the same cab design and having many parts interchangeable. For export markets, the 200 series was sold as a Fargo or DeSoto.

The Dodge would go on until 1963, before being modernized as the "Dodge 400 series", receiving the cab of the American Dodge D series medium-duty truck and a new range of engines by Perkins and Leyland Motors. This model was mostly produced for export but was also available to the United Kingdom. The model was not successful on its home market and production there would end by 1965. Due to the Dodge 400 series being almost identical to the original American truck, telling the two apart is not easy.

Dodge would re-use the method of mating an American truck with a European chassis on the Dodge 50 series of 1979, effectively using the Dodge B series van cab and a British designed medium-duty truck platform.

== Buses ==
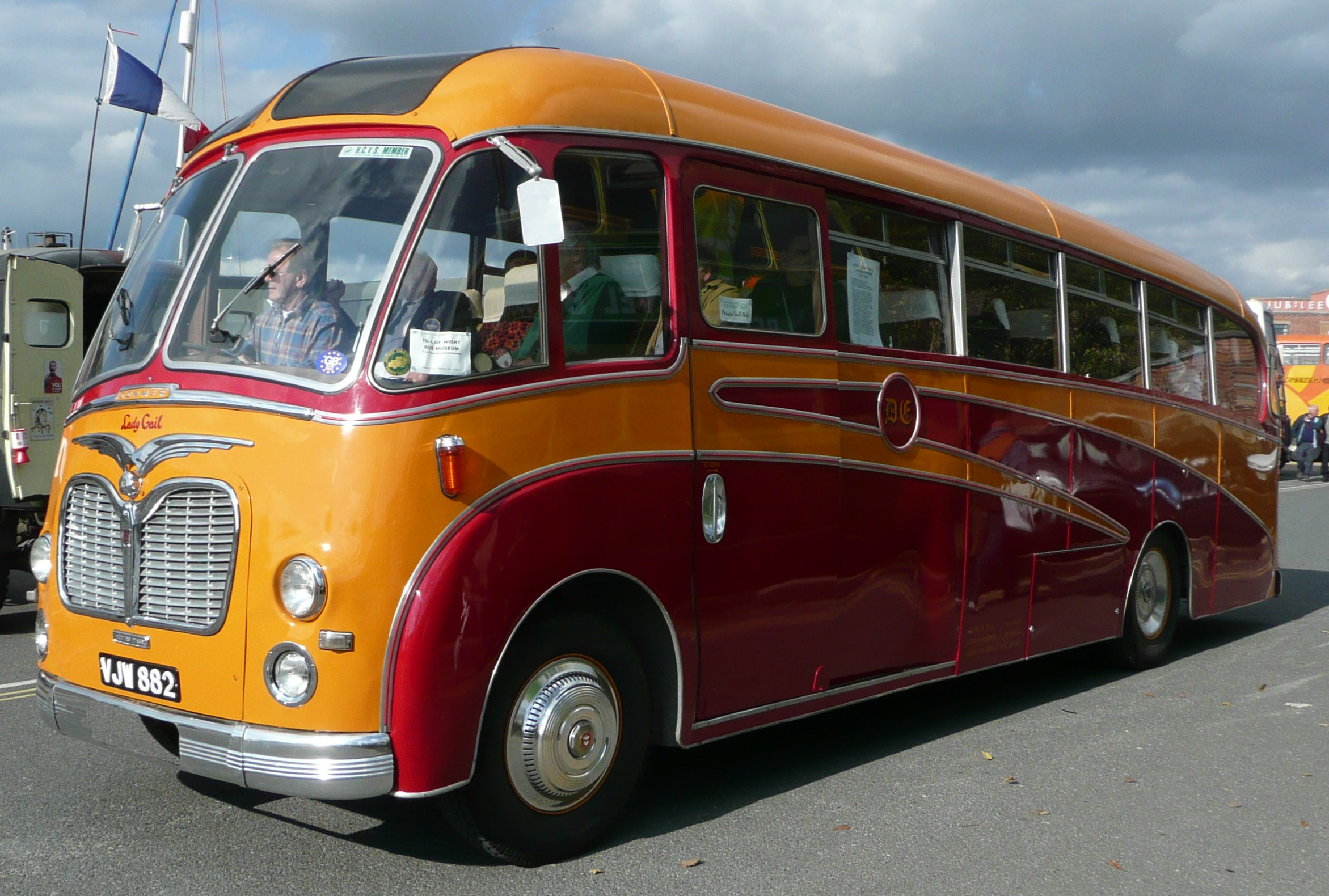
A Commer TS3-engined bus at the Isle of Wight Bus & Coach Museum's 2008 running day

Commer produced buses and is recorded as delivering four to Widnes in 1909. The Commando was released after the Second World War, and the Avenger on 28 February 1948, fitted with the TS3 engine from 1954. The Commando was used as a Crew Bus by the Royal Air Force following the Second World War with a 1 1/2 Length Observation deck.

== Light commercial vehicles ==
=== Commer 8 cwt ===
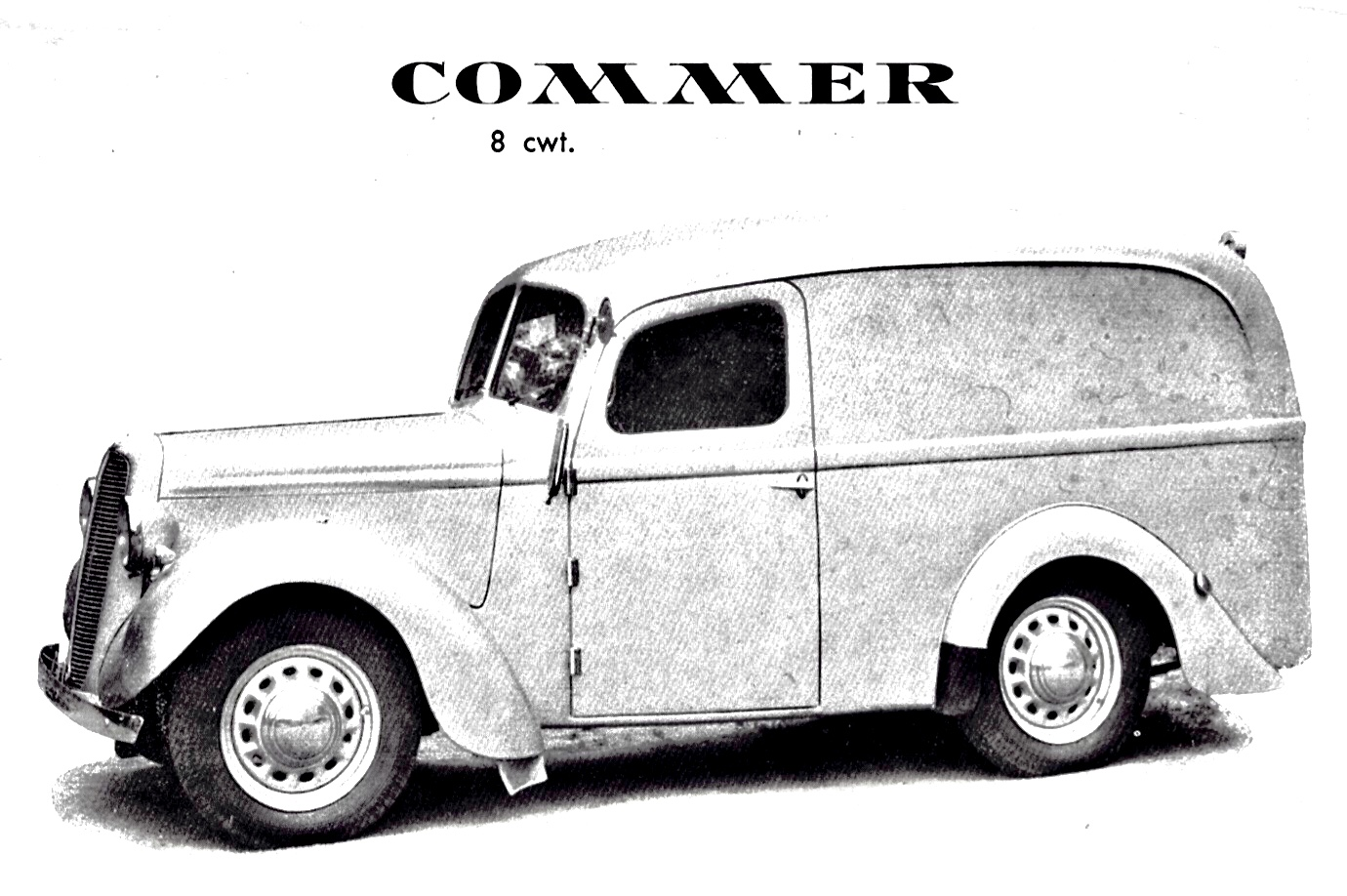
Commer 8 cwt (1934-1939).

The Commer 8 cwt was a light commercial vehicle produced by Commer during the 1930s, competing in the 8 long cwt (410 kg) van range. It had a four-cylinder engine with 1185 cc. The bore was 63 mm and the stroke was 95 mm. The maximum power was 33 hp at 4100 rpm. The tank had a capacity of 33 litres. The wheelbase was 2340 mm.

=== Commer Light Pick-up ===
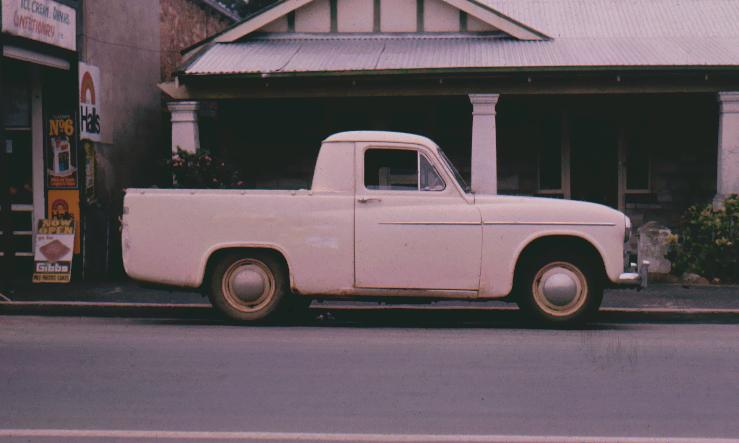
Commer Light Pick-up

The Commer Light Pick-Up was a pickup truck based on the Hillman Minx saloon and produced by Commer during the 1950s; a similar Hillman-badged model was also produced. The Mark III was powered by a 1,184 cc (72.3 cu in) four-cylinder engine, the Mark VI by a 1,265 cc (77.2 cu in) unit and the Mark VIII by a 1,390 cc (85 cu in) engine. Production ended in about 1958.

Australian production circa 1950 included a coupé utility variant with an additional side window.

=== Commer Express Delivery Van ===
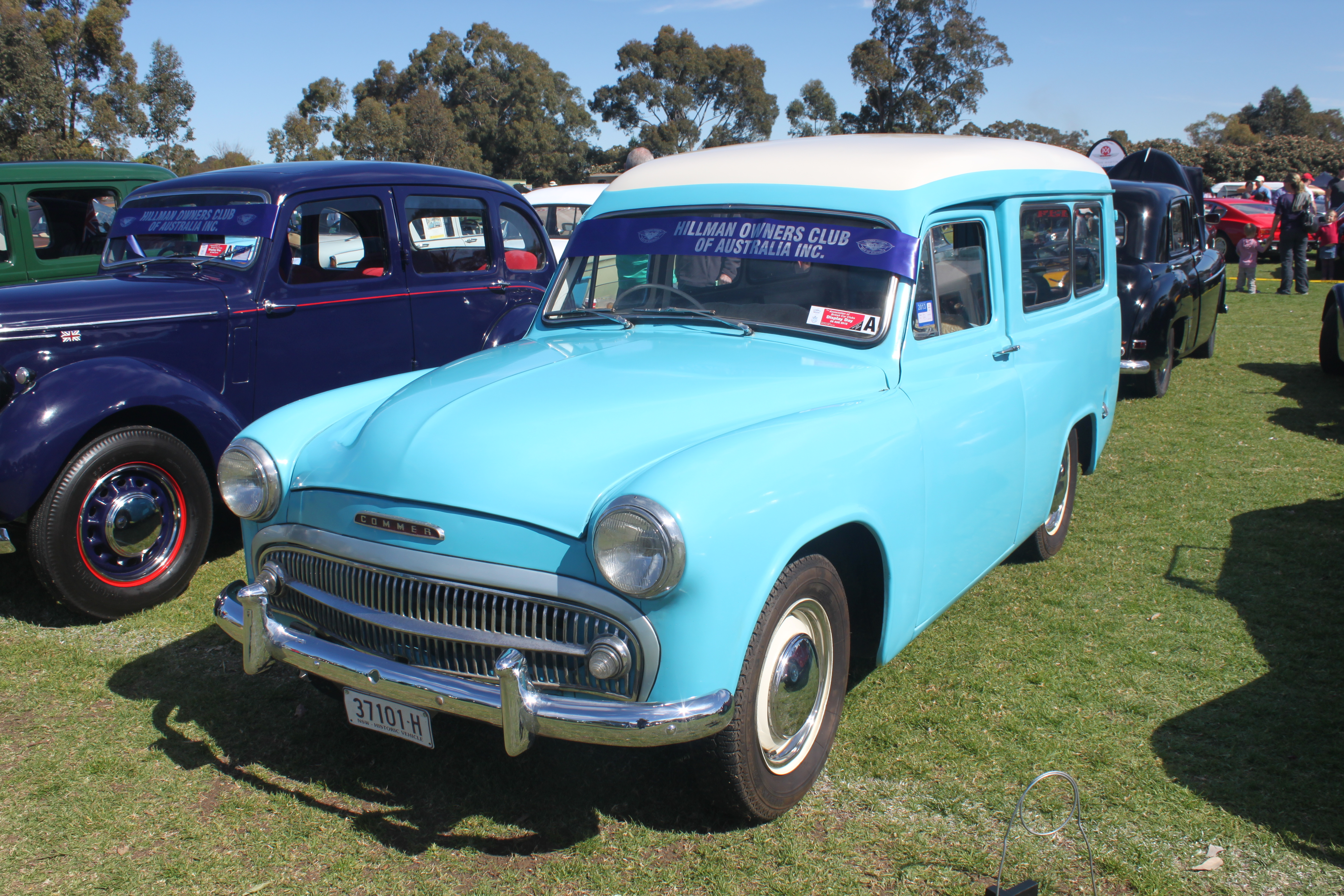
Commer Express Delivery Van

The Commer Express Delivery Van was a light commercial vehicle produced by Commer during the 1950s, competing in the 8–10 long cwt (410–510 kg) van range. It was based on the Hillman Minx saloon and evolved in parallel with that model, with designations ranging from Mark III to Mark VIIIB. The 1957 model, which featured a load space of 100 cu ft (2.8 m^{3}) and a payload of approximately 9 cwt, was powered by a 1,390 cc (85 cu in) four-cylinder Hillman engine and was fitted with a four-speed column-change gearbox. It had coil-sprung independent front suspension and drum brakes all round with twin-leading-shoe units at the front.

It was replaced by the Commer FC vans.

=== Commer Cob ===
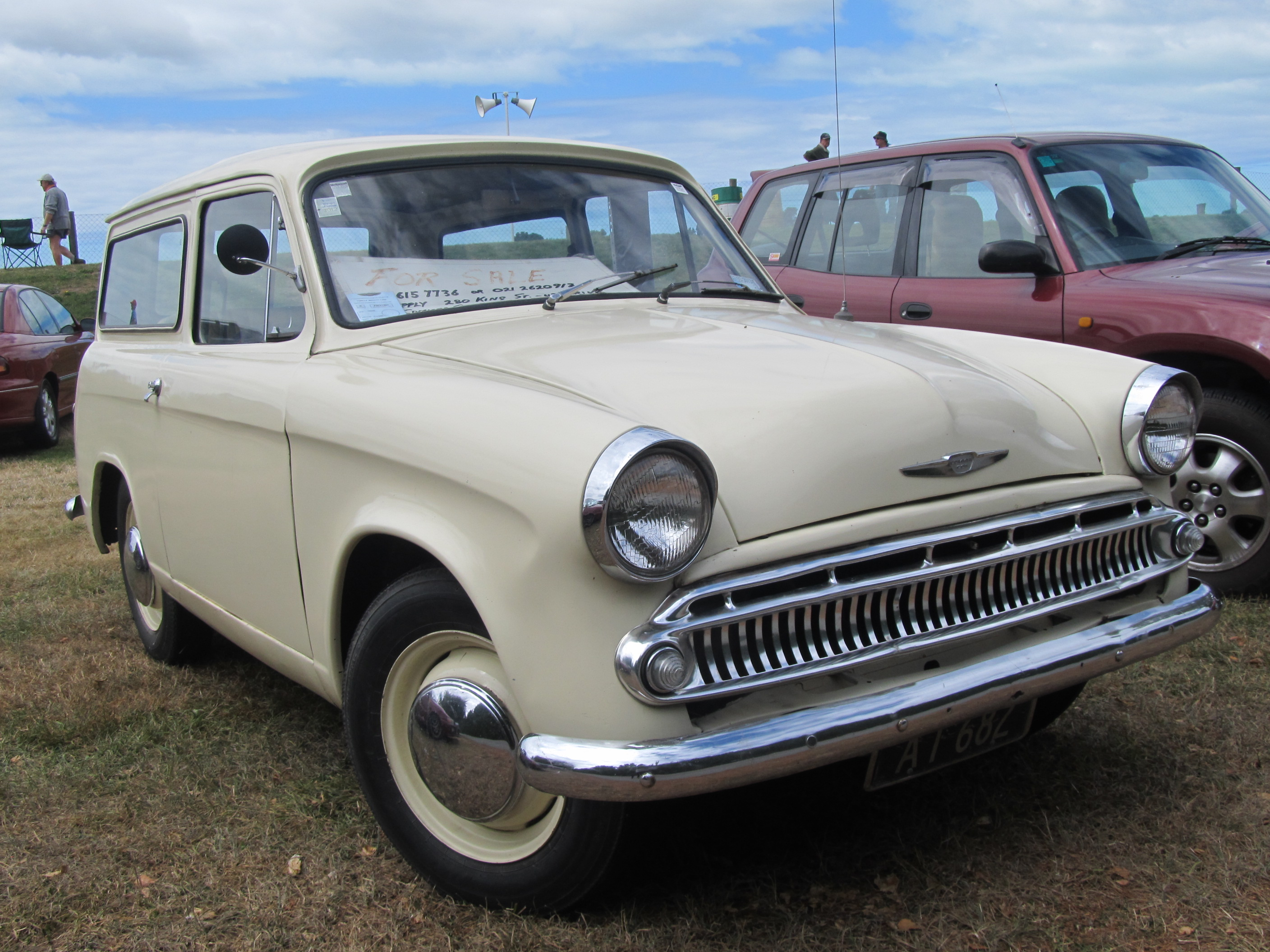
1961 Commer Cob

The Commer Cob is a 7 cwt delivery van introduced in early 1956 based on the Hillman Husky, itself a derivative of the Hillman Minx Mark VIII. Although similar to the Express it was shorter overall with a smaller payload area and a more rounded design. In 1958 new Cob and Husky models were introduced, based on the "Audax" Hillman Minx.

=== Commer Imp Van ===
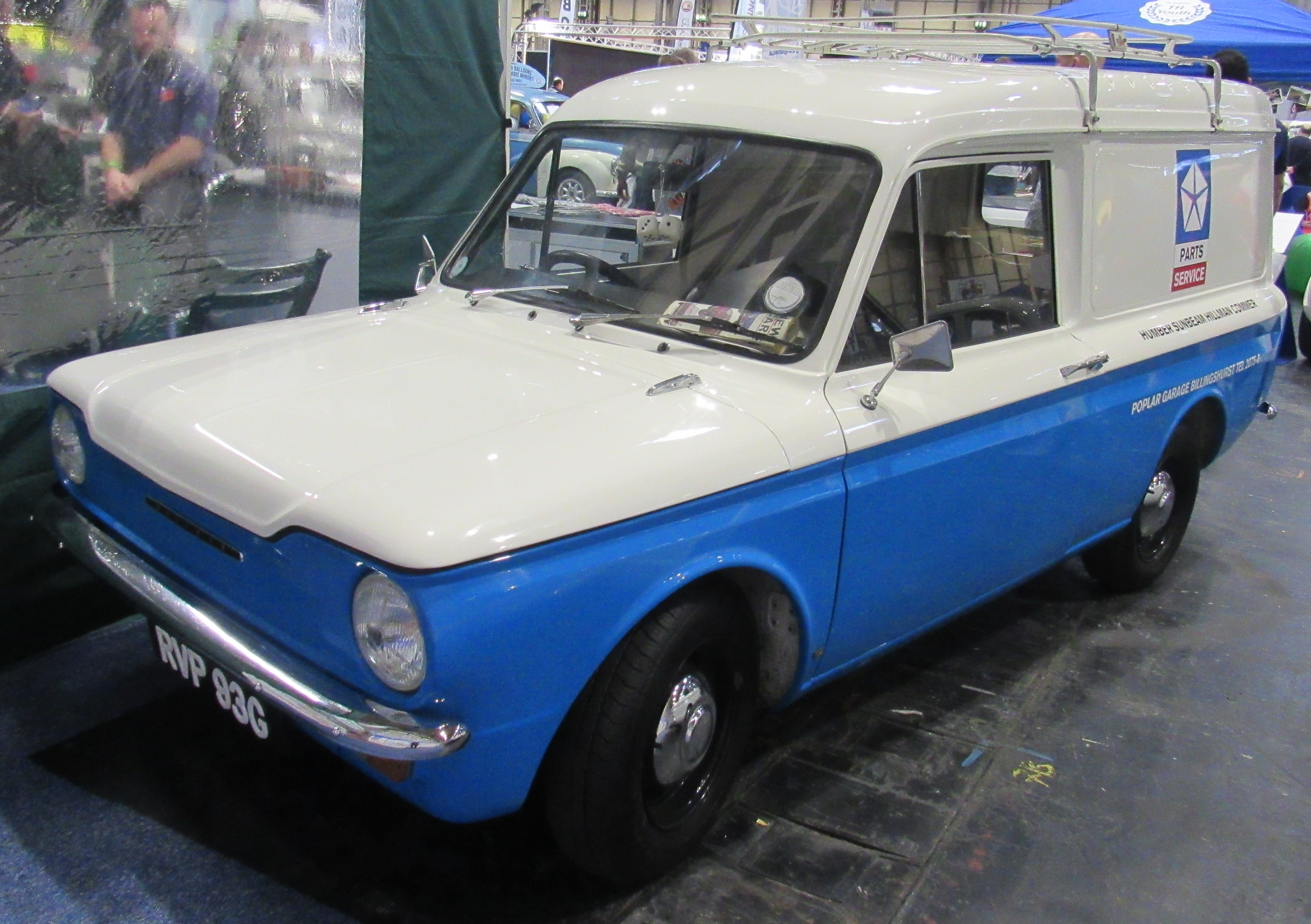
1969 Hillman Imp Van 875cc

The Commer Imp Van was introduced in September 1965 and was based on the Hillman Imp saloon. It was renamed as the Hillman Imp Van in October 1968, with total production reaching 18,194 units prior to it being phased out in July 1970. The last generation of the Hillman Husky estate car, which was introduced in July 1967, was based on the Imp Van and used the same sheetmetal ahead of the B-pillar.

=== Commer BF type forward control and B type ===
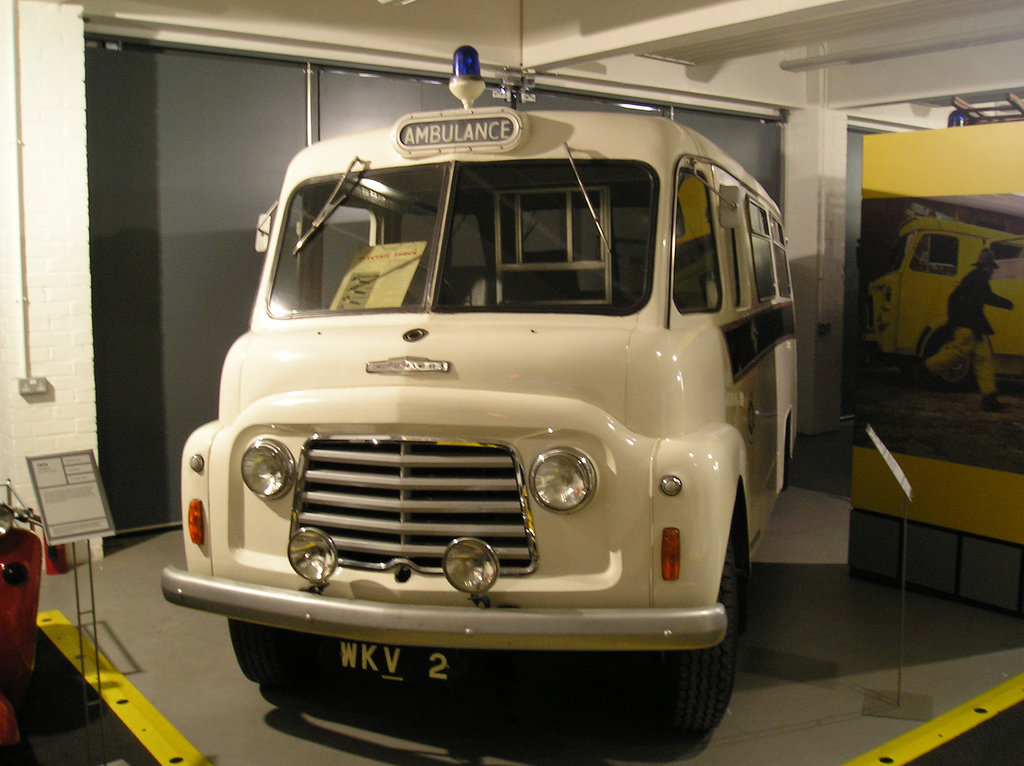
Commer BF based ambulance

The Commer BF/B was a light/medium duty van produced by Commer from 1957, with a design similar to that of the present step-van. Many examples of these vans were coach-built as ice cream vans and ambulances. A number of chassis cab versions were also produced but most of these went for export to countries such as Hong Kong and Sweden, where they were sometimes converted as pickup trucks and box trucks with local bodywork and some other modifications. It had a 1.5 long tons (1.5 tonnes) payload and was fitted with a 2267 cc Straight-4 ohv Humber Hawk engine alongside the transmission. A diesel version of the same engine was also available. Production ended in 1966 after Commer had launched the newer Walk-Thru in 1961, leading to the BF being offered as a cheaper alternative to what eventually became its successor.

Due to the relation between Commer and Karrier at the time, a rebadged version of the BF was also built and sold by Karrier.

=== Commer Walk-Thru ===
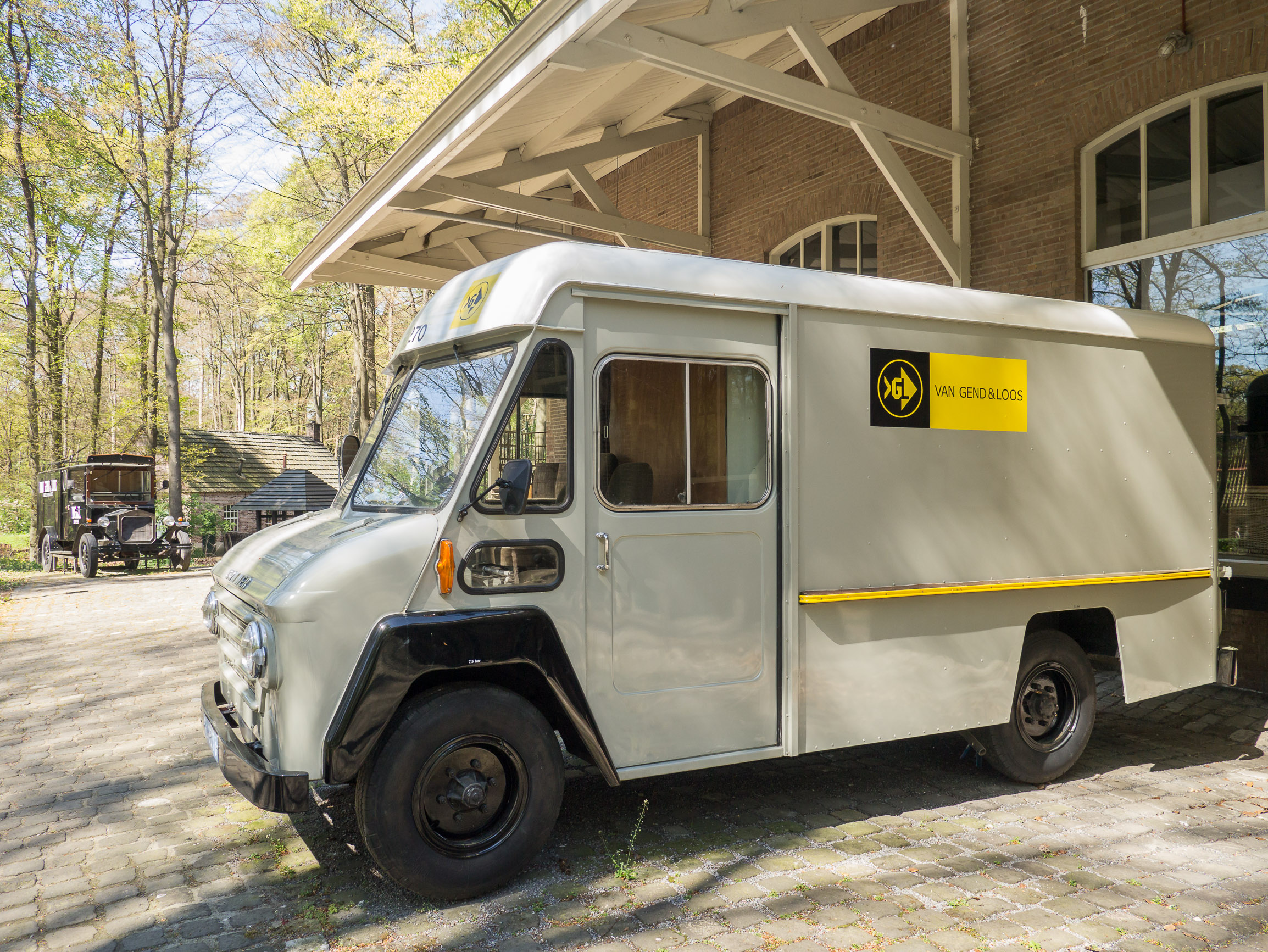
Commer Walk-Thru van as used by the Dutch company Van Gend & Loos

The Commer Walk-Thru was introduced in 1961 as a replacement for the Commer BF. The Walk-Thru was offered in 1 1/2-ton, 2-ton and 3-ton van and cab-chassis variants with a choice of diesel or petrol engines. This van was also built in Spain by Santana Motors, beginning in 1964. Todd Motors in Petone, New Zealand, made a short run of these vehicles during 1970, however they were not a successful model. The body sides were flat steel, pop riveted to the steel sides. The Walk-Thru was later modernized and sold under the Dodge brand (parent company Renault / Chrysler) until the late 1970s when it was replaced by the 50 Series of commercial vehicles.

=== Commer FC/PA/PB/Spacevan ===
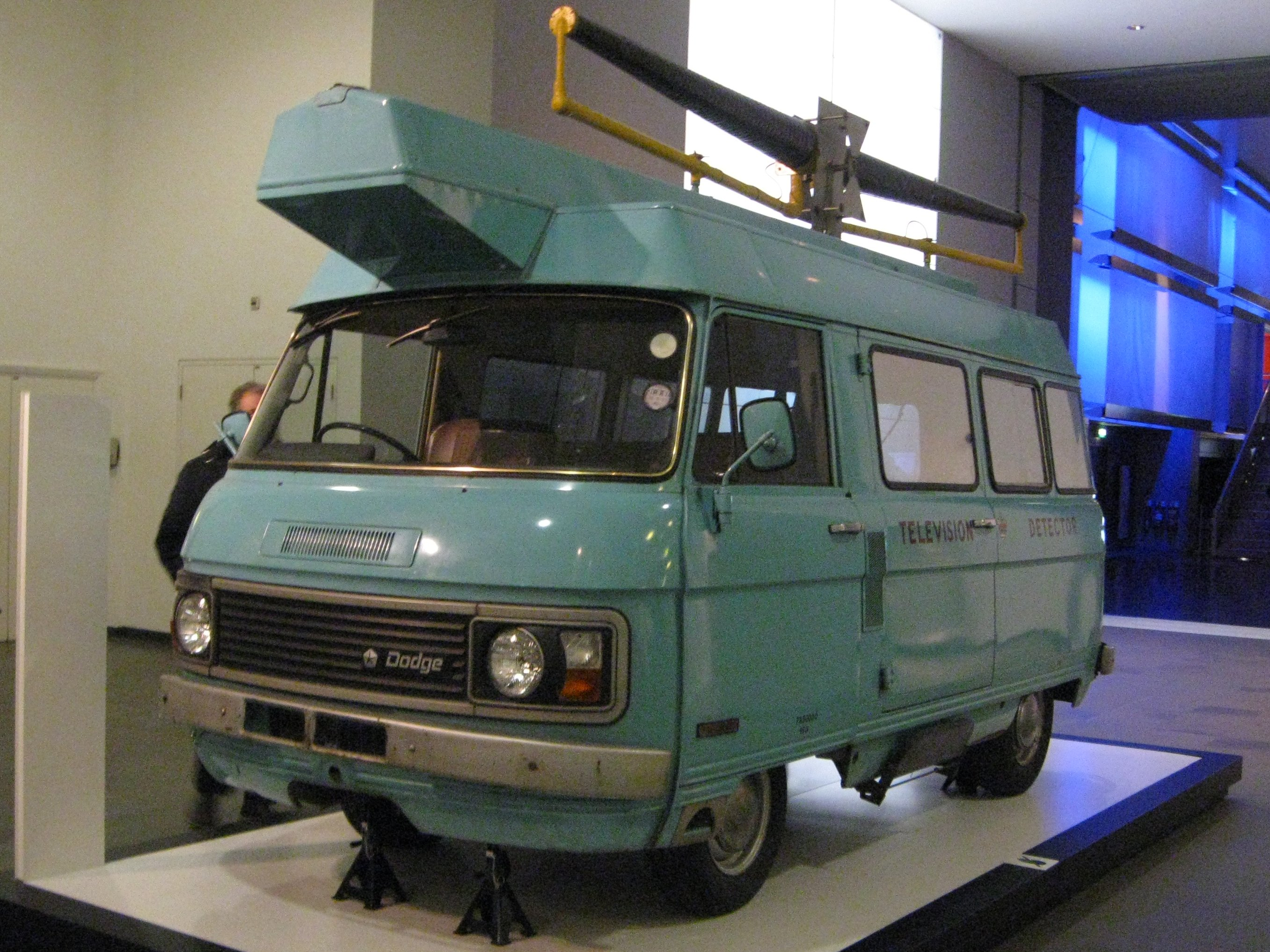
Dodge-badged SpaceVan equipped as TV detector van. Displayed at Science Museum, London. (As of January 2015)

The Commer FC was introduced in 1960 with many body styles, including a 1,500 cc (92 cu in) van. After engine and interior upgrades it was renamed the PB in 1967 and the SpaceVan in 1974. As noted above, it would be sold as a Dodge and Fargo model until 1976, when both Commer and Fargo names were dropped. These were rounded-front forward-control vans with narrow front track—a legacy of their Humber car-derived suspension. Using at first the Hillman-derived 1,500 cc (92 cu in) 4-cylinder engine in the PA series, then the larger 1,600 cc (98 cu in), and from 1968 onwards the 1,725 cc (105.3 cu in) unit in the PB, only the cast-iron-head version of this engine were used. A Perkins 4108 diesel was also available.

Reportedly, one condition of the government bailout of Chrysler's British operations in 1976 was a commitment to upgrade the Spacevan, which was praised for its brakes, cornering, and price, but criticized for its power, comforts, and top speed. A revised Spacevan was thus introduced in 1977, using the same mechanicals but with numerous cosmetic changes, conveniences, and a new interior. Although outdated by its demise in 1982, by which time Commer had been taken over by Peugeot, the Spacevan remained a familiar sight in the UK thanks to its role with Post Office Telecommunications—which was almost solely responsible for it remaining in production for so long. These vans and outstanding orders were inherited by British Telecom on its formation in October 1981. By this time, there were three engines: two 1.7-litre petrol engines of 37 kW (with low compression) and 42 kW (with high compression), and a small diesel engine (31 kW), with a four-speed manual transmission and no automatic available. The last Spacevan was built in 1983.

== Military vehicles ==
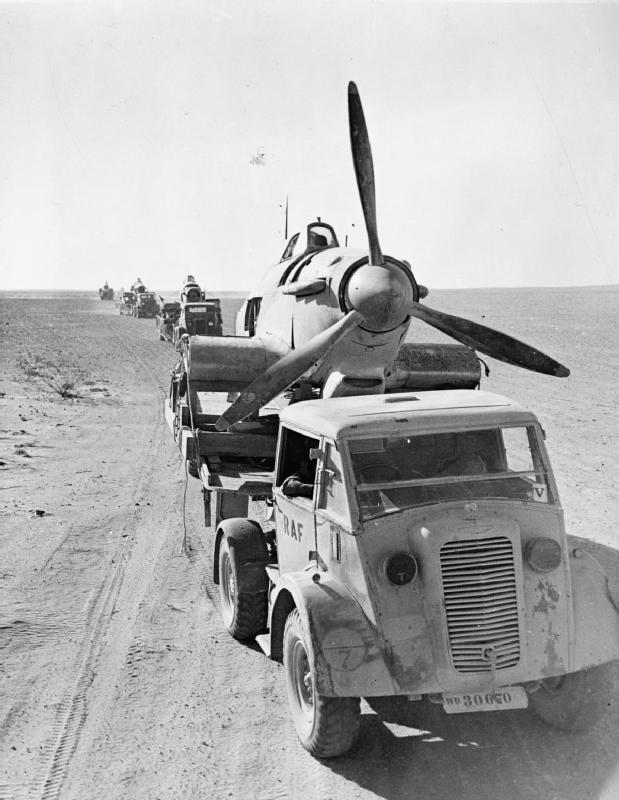
Commer Q2

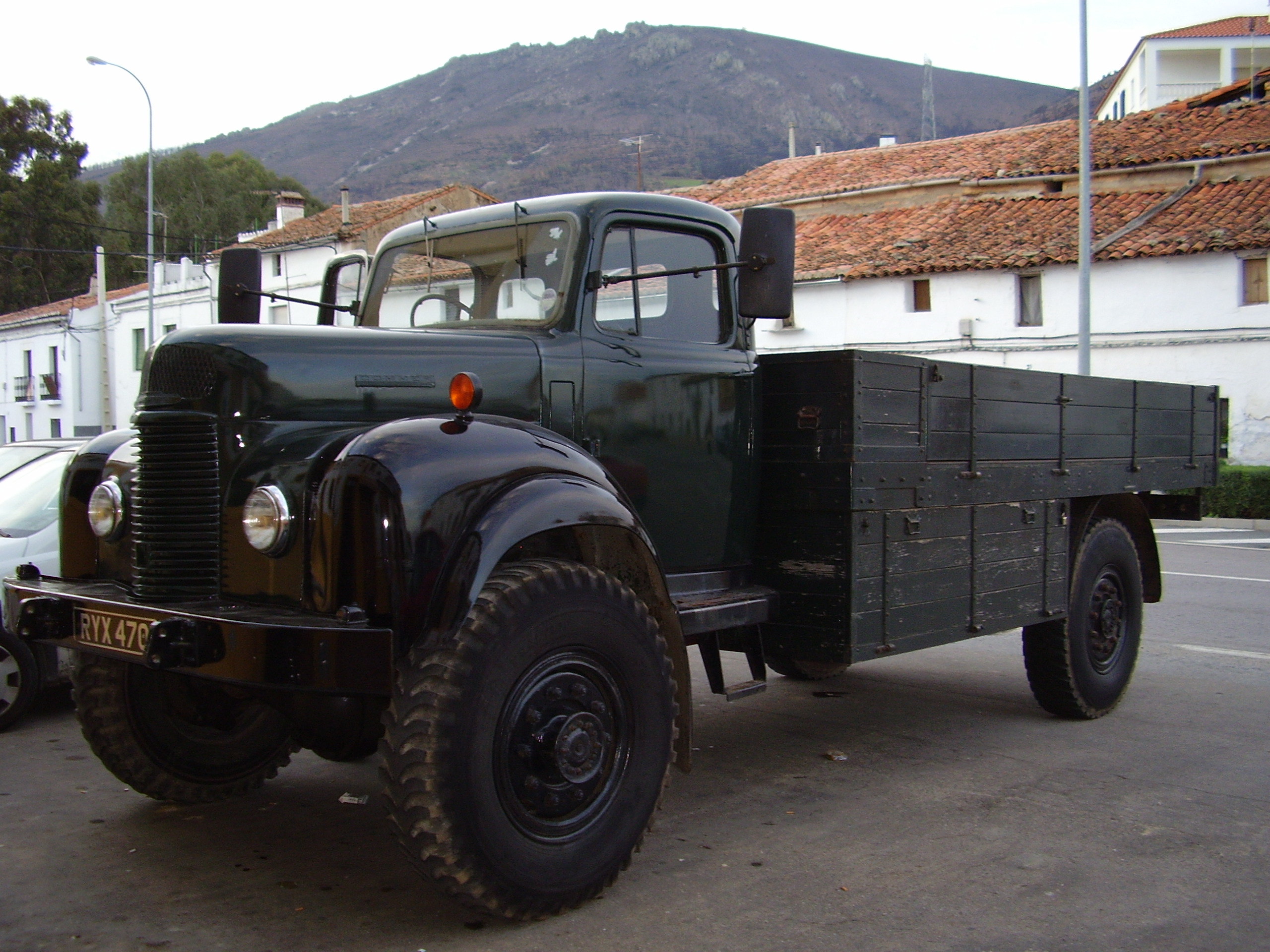
Commer Q4

Commer made a range of military vehicles for use during the Second World War, with the range still in use in the 1980s. While serving in the army, British humourist Frank Muir reported a broken-down vehicle over his radio with the words "The Commer has come to a full stop."

== Engines ==
Commer designed and manufactured its own diesel engines for its heavy commercial vehicles and buses. They were low-profile units designed to be deployed under the floor of the cab.

=== TS3 ===
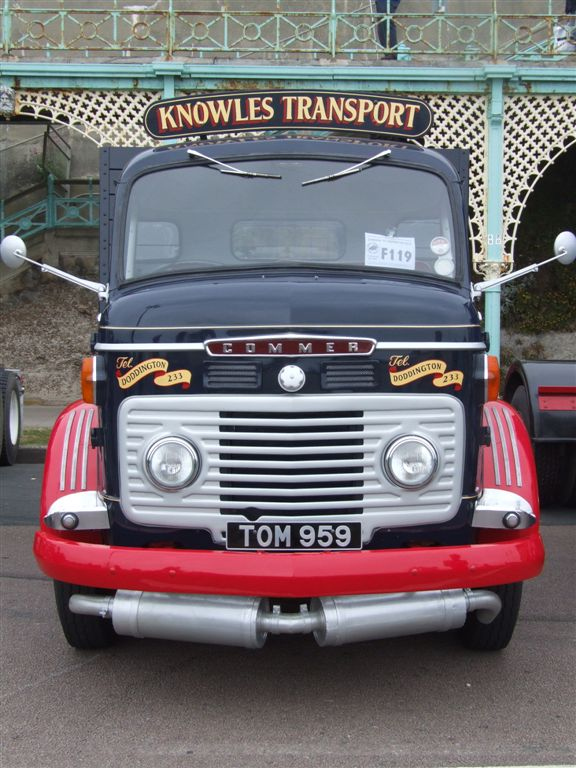
Commer 1954 tractor unit

The TS3 engine was a two-stroke diesel unit with three cylinders each containing a pair of pistons arranged with the combustion chamber formed between the crown of the piston pair and the cylinder walls. It was designed specifically for the Commer range of trucks. The TS3 and derivative TS4 were unique in using rockers to deliver power to the single crankshaft.

=== TS4 ===
The TS4 engine ran 1.2 million miles as a pre-production prototype. It was a 4-cylinder version of the TS3.

== Motorsport ==
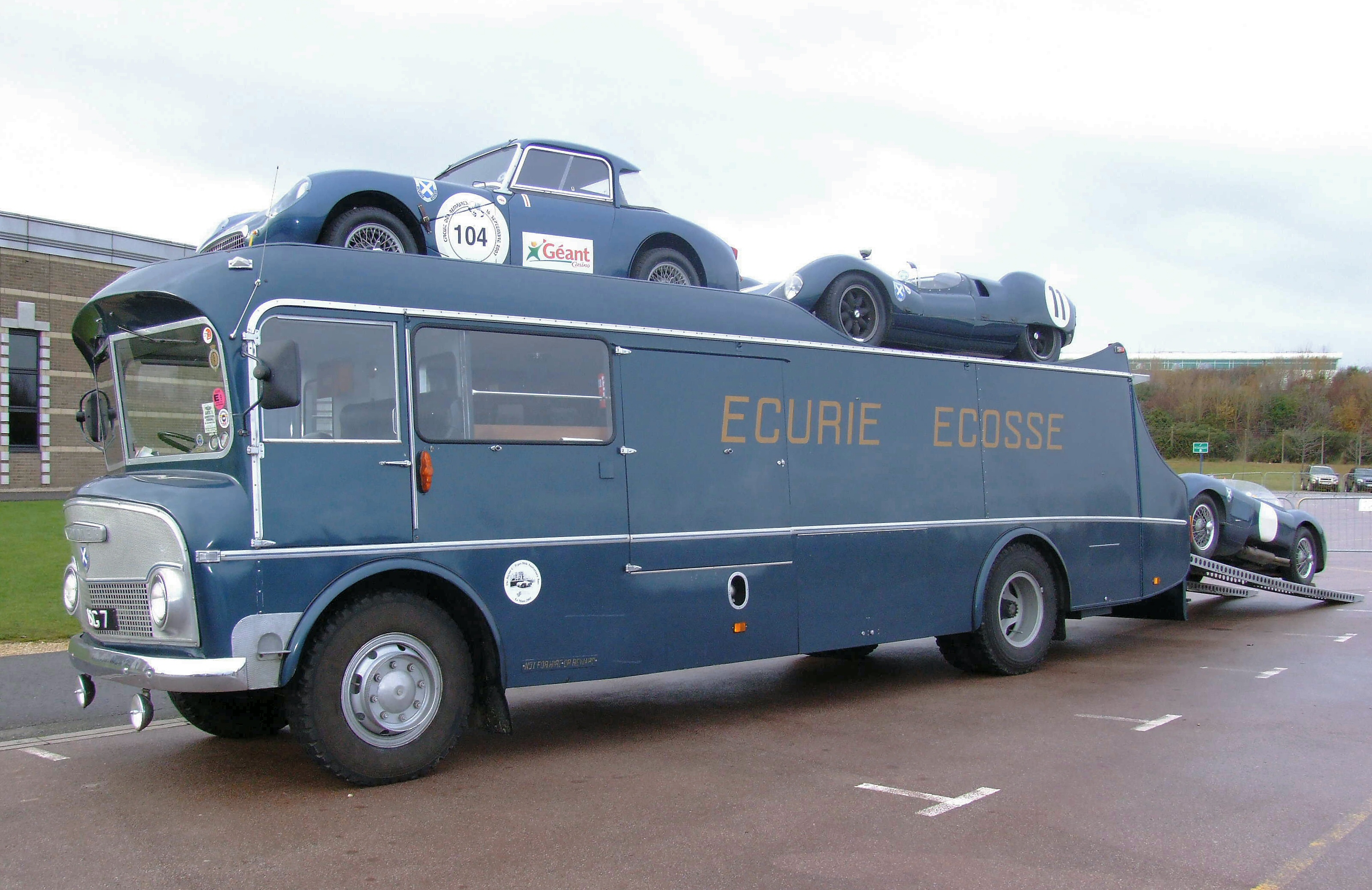
The restored Ecurie Ecosse Car Transporter

The Scottish motor racing team Ecurie Ecosse, used a Commer-based double-deck transporter during the 1950s.

== Karrier ==
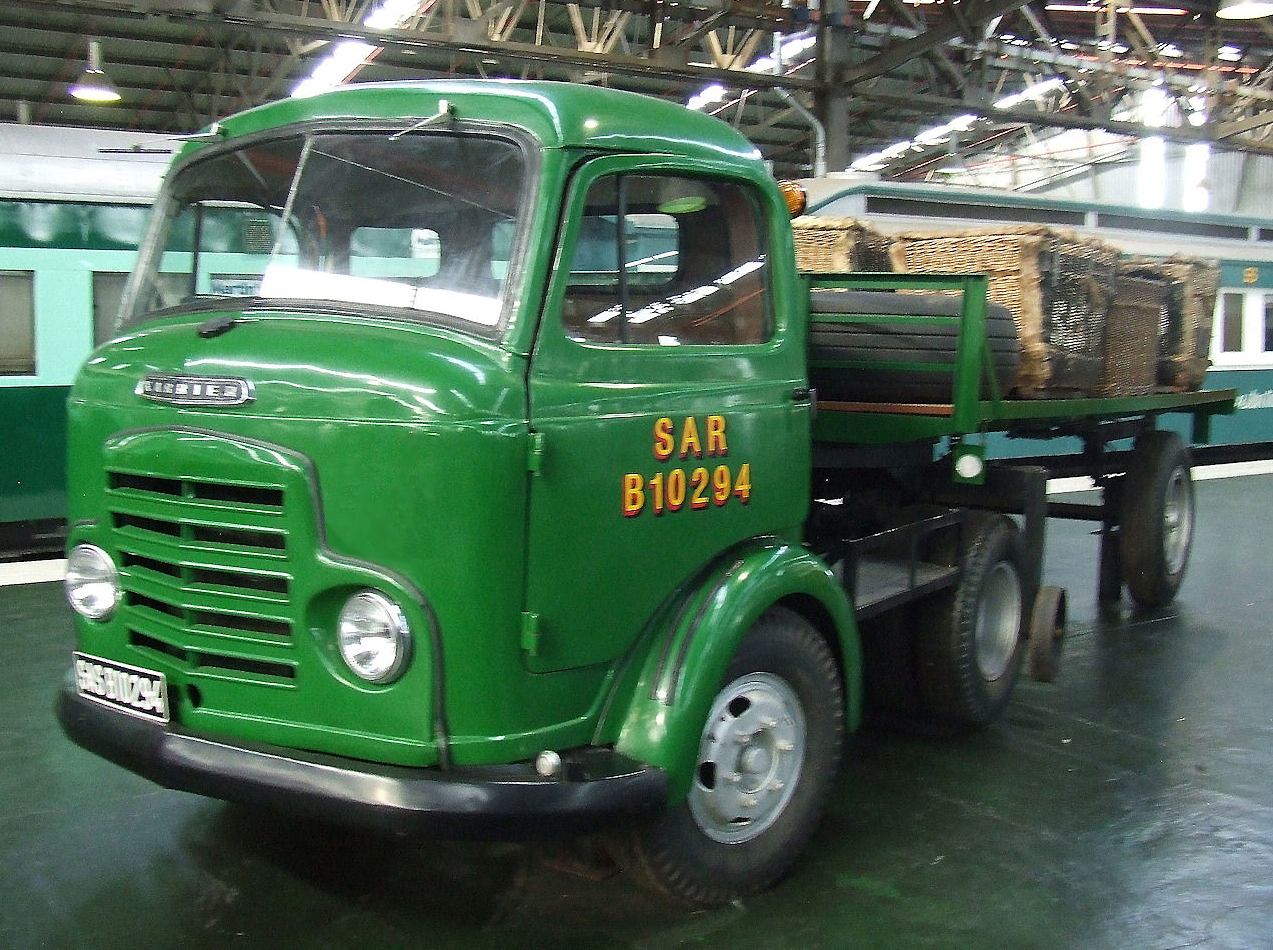
Karrier Bantam (c. 1952)

Commer acquired the Karrier company in 1934 and Karrier joined the Rootes Group. Special products in their catalogue included their Cob tractor, their "mechanical horse" originated by Karrier in 1930, and municipal motor appliances: refuse collectors, sweepers and trolley buses. The Cob had been supplied to the Southern, LNE and LM&S railway companies and repeat orders were in hand at the time Karrier was bought.

In the early 1960s production moved to Dunstable where Commer, Dodge (UK) and Karrier were all brought together.

The Karrier trademark is now owned by Peugeot.

== Scale models and die-cast ==
- Lesney Products "Matchbox" Series; No. 47b, (production 1963 to 1969), Commer BF "Ice Cream Canteen", Lyons Maid livery, approximately 00 scale.
- Lesney Products "Matchbox" Series; No. 50a, (production starting 1958), Commer Light Pick-Up Mk.VIII, approximately 00 scale.
- Lesney Products "Matchbox" Series; No. 62b, (production 1963 to 1969), Commer BF "TV Service Van", 'Rentaset' livery, approximately 00 scale.
- Lesney Products "Matchbox" Series; No. 69a, (production starting 1959), Commer (BF) 30 CWT Van, 'Nestle's' livery, approximately 00 scale.
- Lesney Products "Matchbox" Series; No. 21c, (production starting 1961), Commer FC "Milk Float", 'Drink more milk' signage, approximately 00 scale.
- Meccano Dinky Toys; No. 430 (production 1954–64), Commer Breakdown Vehicle (Superpoise), approximately O scale (1:44).
- Corgi produced several models based on Commer vehicles between 1956 and 1971, including liveried delivery vans, dropside lorries and a mobile camera van (with accessories) in approximately O scale (1:44).
- Oxford Diecast produce several models based on Commer vehicles in OO scale and N scale.

== See also ==
- Dodge 50 series
- Dodge 500 trucks
