= Sulzer ZG9 =

Sulzer ZG9 was a pre-World War II opposed-piston two-stroke diesel engine by Sulzer. The engine was available with a choice of two, three and four cylinders (2ZG9, 3ZG9, 4ZG9); the two-cylinder version developed 120 bhp. It used a piston scavenge pump. This was mounted vertically above one rocker, driven by a bellcrank from the main rockers. This engine is sometimes cited as an inspiration for the Commer TS3 design.

== Specification ==
Data from

=== General characteristics ===
- Type: Two cylinders, four opposed pistons.
- Bore: 90 mm
- Stroke: 120 mm

=== Performance ===
- Power output: 50 PSe / 36,77 kW at 1,500 rpm

== See also ==
- Arrol-Johnston - 1905 opposed piston petrol engine
- Commer TS3
- Junkers Jumo 204 - an opposed-piston aircraft engine of the 1930s
- Napier Deltic - large multi-bank engine, with crankshafts shared between cylinder banks.
