= Commer TS3 =

Overview
- Manufacturer: Commer

Layout
- Configuration: three-cylinder, six-piston opposed piston engine with rocker drive to a single crankshaft.
- Displacement: 3.261 litres (200 cu in)
- Cylinder bore: 3 1/4 inch (83 mm)
- Piston stroke: 4 inch (102 mm)

Combustion
- Fuel type: Diesel
- Oil system: Wet sump
- Cooling system: Water-cooled

Output
- Power output: 105 brake horsepower (78 kW) at 2,400 rpm
- Torque output: 270 lb.ft at 1,200 rpm

The Commer TS3 was a diesel engine fitted in Commer trucks built by the Rootes Group in the 1950s and 1960s. It was the first diesel engine used by the company.

== Development ==
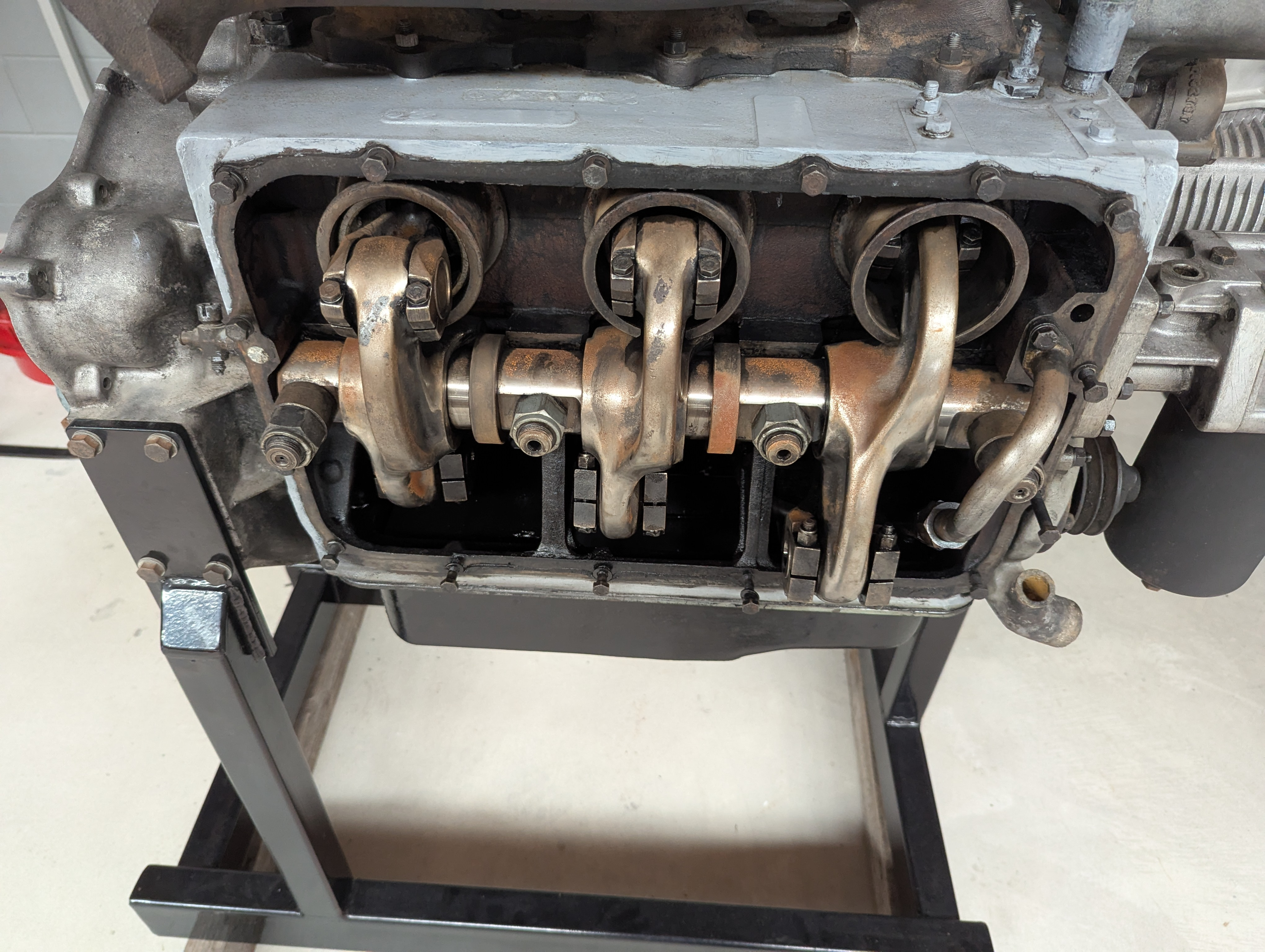
Commer TS3 engine with side cover removed, showing the pistons and the unique rocker crank components. Engine on display at Bill Richardson Transport World, Invercargill, New Zealand.

Rootes' intention for the engine was for it to fit under the QX "cab forward" design fitted to the R7 7ton truck released in 1948. This very advanced design had been built with the engine under the seat to allow three men to fit comfortably across the cab. The petrol version used a development of the Humber Super Snipe engine, lying at a 66 degree angle, and the opposed piston design of the TS3 was used so that it would fit in the same space.

It is often thought that "TS" in the engine's name derives from its Tilling-Stevens origins, a company acquired by Rootes in 1950 but this is incorrect. It stands for Two-stroke. Development of the engine started at the Humber plant at Stoke Aldermoor some four years before Rootes had acquired Tilling-Stevens. The small design team headed by Chief Engineer Eric Coy, began working on the TS3 design for Rootes in 1945 After a single cylinder two stroke prototype (to test cylinder design) and two TS3 motors were built at Stoke Aldermoor to test the engine design, production moved in 1954 to the Tilling-Stevens plant in Maidstone, Kent, mainly because it had spare capacity.

== Layout ==
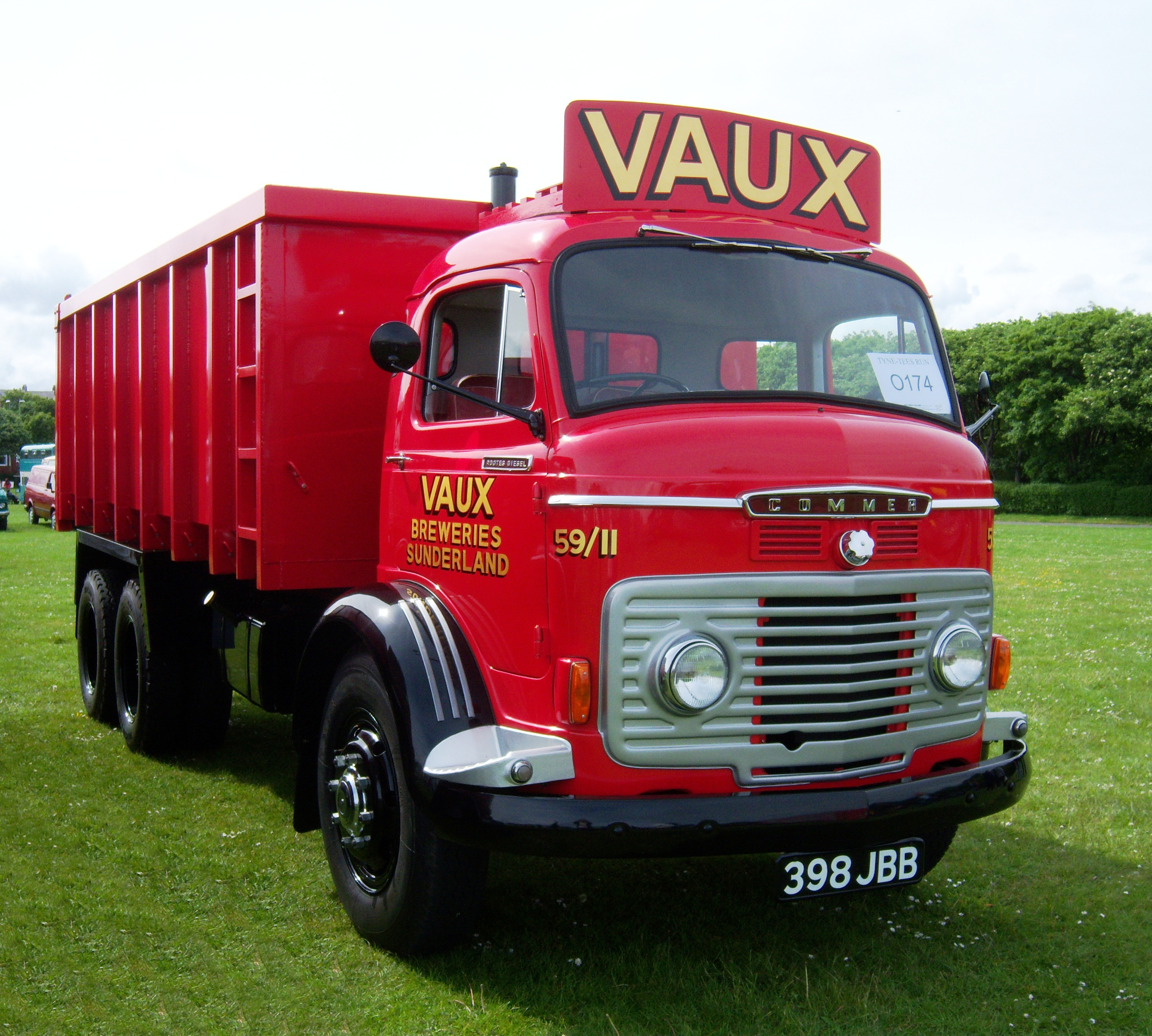
1959 Commer truck designed to take the "flat" TS3 engine with its horizontally mounted cylinders. With the engine mounted beneath the floor of the cab, the bonnet (hood) of the truck could be dispensed with. The windscreen and driver were then moved to the front of the vehicle, resulting in the UK's first short-cab lorry, with a cab over design that avoided the excessive height of the tilt-cab Bedford QL.

The engine was unusual in being an opposed piston engine where each horizontal cylinder contains two pistons, one at each end, that move in opposition to each other. Even more unusually, both sets of pistons drove only a single crankshaft; most opposed piston engines have a separate crankshaft at each end of the cylinder. The TS3 engine used a single crankshaft beneath the cylinders, each piston driving it through a connecting rod, a rocker lever and a second connecting rod. The crankshaft had six crankpins and there were six rockers.

The engine was a two-stroke, of compression-ignition with uniflow-ported cylinders. Scavenging was performed by a Roots blower, (Note: Roots is a different company to Rootes. The blower was actually made by Wade in Birmingham) which was mounted on the front of the engine and driven by a long quill shaft from a chain drive at the rear of the engine. In general the engines gained a reputation for good performance, but this quill shaft was somewhat prone to breaking if over-worked.

== Dimensions ==
Data from

=== General characteristics ===
- Type: Three cylinders, opposed pistons. Uniflow ports.
- Bore: 3 1/4 inch (83 mm)
- Stroke: 4 inch (102 mm)
- Displacement: 3.261 L (200 cu in)

=== Performance ===
- Power output: 105 bhp (78 kW) at 2,400 rpm
- Torque: 270 lb.ft at 1,200 rpm
- BMEP: 105 lb.sq.in

== Applications ==
=== Trucks ===
The TS3 was used in both the Commer and Karrier range of trucks. As the horizontal cylinders were lower than a vertical engine, the engine was mounted beneath the floor of the cab. The bonnet (hood) of the truck could be dispensed with, moving the windscreen and driver forward to give one of the first of the now common cab forward trucks.

Access for maintenance was generally good: a small hatch in the cab gave access to the oil and fuel filters, the injection pump and injectors. Connecting rods and pistons could be accessed from outside each side of the cab, behind removable doors, without removing the engine. As there was no camshaft or valves, this removed the usual need to access the cylinder head of a conventional engine. Even the blower could be replaced by first removing the radiator and working from the front. Only the crankshaft bearings required the engine block to be removed from the chassis.

The knocker name for the TS3 is a nickname coming from its extensive use in New Zealand and Australia. The later United Kingdom 3D215 and 3DD215 TS3 motors had the Clayton - Dewandre SC-6 compressor fitted with a harmonic damper which removed any timing gear clatter. Export versions of these TS3s had the larger Clayton Dewandre SC-9 compressor with no damper.

=== Buses ===
The TS3 was used in the Commer Avenger Marks II, III and IV PSV chassis, and also in a number of Integral models from John C. Beadle and Thomas Harrington Ltd from 1952-63. Initially these were a sales success, as they were more reliable and economical than the then-current diesel-engined variant of the Bedford SB, however the noise produced by the TS3 was not acceptable to tours operators and the higher body mounting compared with the SB required extra work for coachbuilders and made the Avenger more expensive than the Bedford. The last straw was in 1957 when Ford announced a PSV version of its Thames Trader, which could take an identical body to the SB and had a conventional six-cylinder diesel engine (which turned out to be quieter than either the TS3 or the Perkins R6 fitted to the SBO). From 1957 Commer Avenger sales began to dwindle. It's notable that Thomas Harrington Ltd never tooled updated versions of its Crusader body for the Avenger, although that is also perhaps due to the conservatism of the combination's sole customer Southdown Motor Services. Several rear engined Foden buses in New Zealand have been repowered with Commer TS3 engines, as have several river boats.

== Variants ==
=== Rootes-Lister ===
Rootes Group, Commer's parent company, entered into a partnership with Lister to market the engines as industrial stationary engines through a joint company Rootes-Lister Ltd. The venture was not a success for industrial engines, although some were sold as marine engines by Lister Blackstone Marine Ltd. Many of these marine engines survive today.

Rootes Lister Blackstone (3-cylinder 2-stroke) TS3 engine in action. on YouTube

=== Commer TS4 ===
The TS4 engine was an enlarged four-cylinder version of the TS3. It ran 1.2 million miles as a pre-production prototype. The project was cancelled after Chrysler bought Rootes in 1968.

== Comparable engines ==
=== Sulzer ZG9 ===
There are very few similar engines. Opposed-piston diesel engines are rare enough at this size, the rocker lever arrangement was almost unheard of. Probably the only engine using a similar arrangement was the pre-war Sulzer ZG9. This was an opposed-piston engine with a choice of two, three and four cylinders (2ZG9, 3ZG9, 4ZG9); the two-cylinder version developed 120 bhp. Its layout was very similar to the Commer engines, but it used a piston scavenge pump rather than a Roots blower. This was mounted vertically above one rocker, driven by a bellcrank from the main rockers. This engine is sometimes cited as an inspiration for the Commer design.

Data from

=== General characteristics ===
- Type: Two cylinders, four opposed pistons.
- Bore: 90 mm
- Stroke: 120 mm

=== Performance ===
- Power output: 50 PSe/36,77 kW at 1,500 rpm

== See also ==
- Gobron-Brillié - French cars, circa 1900, using opposed pistons driven
- Junkers Jumo 204 - an opposed-piston aircraft engine of the 1930s
- Napier Deltic - large multi-bank engine, with crankshafts shared between cylinder banks.
- Sulzer ZG9 - Swiss-made pre-war engine.
- Leyland L60 - tank engine, which Tilling-Stevens were involved in the design-of
