= Hillman Minx =

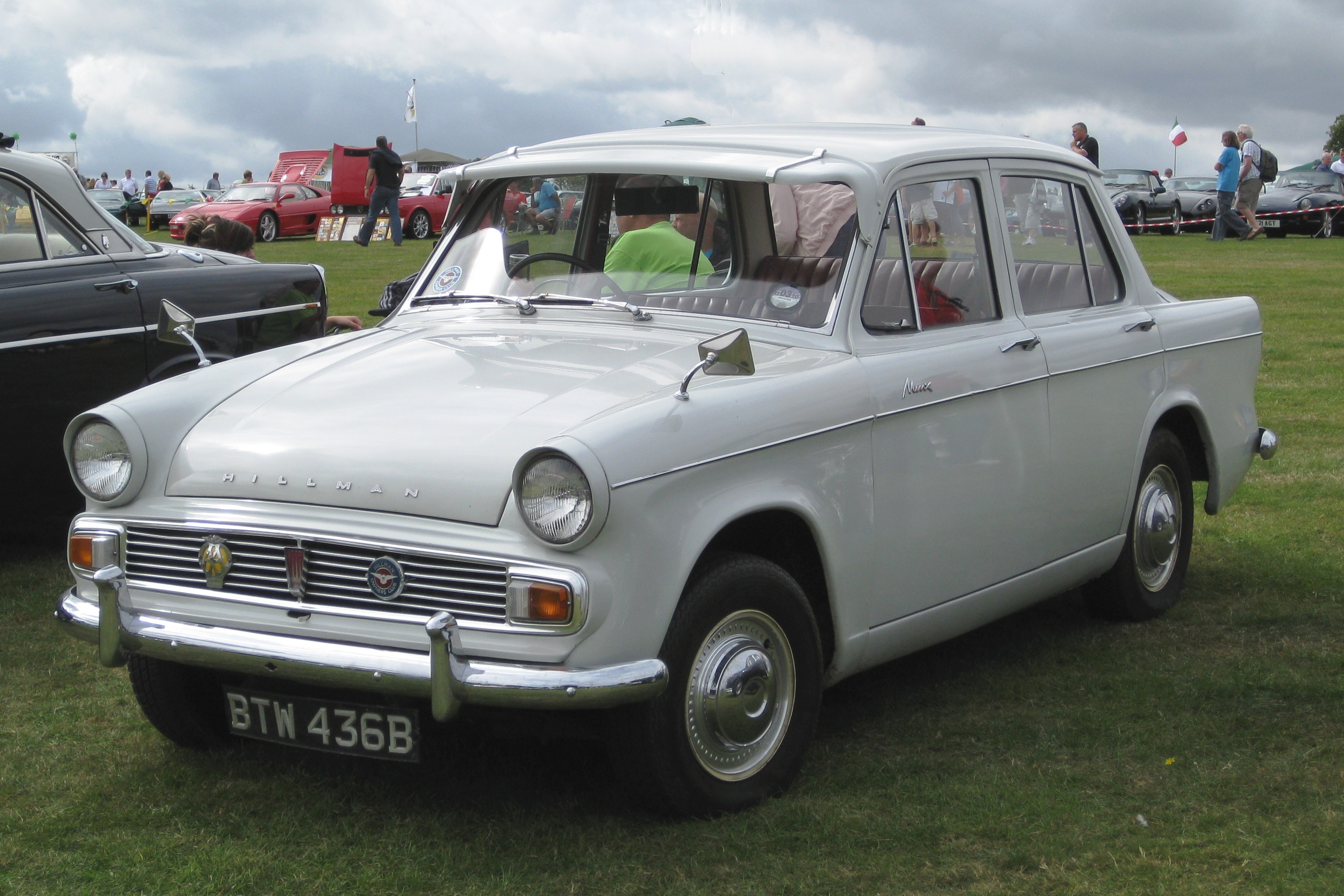
- Hillman Minx Series V

Overview
- Manufacturer: Hillman (Rootes Group)
- Production: 1931–1970

Body and chassis
- Class: Mid-size / Large family car (D)
- Body style: 4-door saloon 2-door coupé 2-door convertible 2-door standard estate 2-door short wheelbase estate 2-door van 2-door coupé utility

Chronology
- Predecessor: Hillman 14
- Successor: Hillman Hunter; Hillman Avenger

The Hillman Minx was a mid-sized family car that British car maker Hillman produced from 1931 to 1970. There were many versions of the Minx over that period, as well as badge engineered variants sold by Humber, Singer, and Sunbeam.

From the mid-1950s to the mid-1960s, the Minx and its derivatives were the greatest-volume sellers of the "Audax" family of cars from Rootes, which also included the Singer Gazelle and Sunbeam Rapier. The final version of the Minx was the "New Minx" launched in 1967, which was part of the "Arrow" family and essentially a basic version of the Hillman Hunter. Generally, the Minx was available in four-door saloon and estate forms, with a 1496-cc engine.

The Hillman Super Minx was a slightly larger model offered during the Audax era.

Throughout the life of the Minx, there was usually an estate version—and, from 1954 to 1965, a short-wheelbase estate, the Hillman Husky, and a van derivative known as the Commer Cob.

The Minx model name was revived briefly – along with the "Rapier" name, as applied to the Sunbeam Rapier version of the Audax family – as a special edition late in the life of the Talbot Alpine / Talbot Solara cars, produced by Chrysler Europe after its takeover of the Rootes Group.

== Pre-WWII Minx ==
Hillman Minx
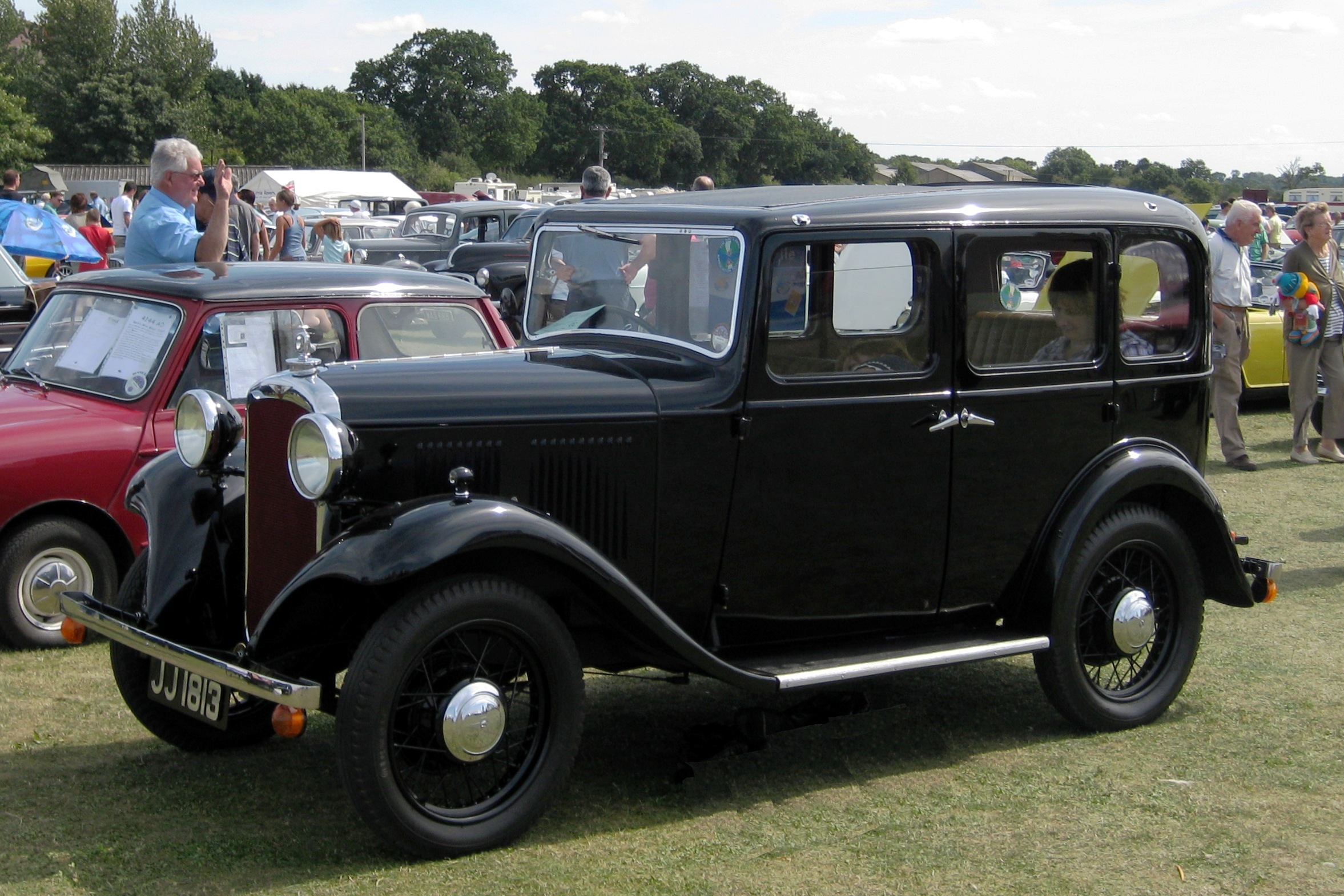
- Hillman Minx 4-Door Saloon 1932

Overview
- Production: October 1931–1939

The original Minx was announced to the public 1 October 1931. It was straightforward and conventional with a pressed-steel body on separate chassis and 30 bhp 1185 cc engine producing cushioned power. (Note: Instead of being bolted firmly to the chassis the engine was mounted so that it could rock from side to side restricted by a leaf spring.) It was upgraded with a four-speed transmission in 1934 and a styling upgrade, most noticeably a slightly V-shaped grille. For 1935 the range was similar except that synchromesh was added to all forward gears and this Minx became the first mass-produced car with an all-synchromesh gearbox. it was designed by Rootes' technical director Captain John Samuel Irving (1880-1953), designer of Sunbeam aero engines and Sunbeam's Golden Arrow' in conjunction with Alfred Herbert Wilde (1891–1930), recently chief engineer of Standard and designer of the Standard Nine.

The 1936 model had a new name, the Minx Magnificent, and a restyle with a much more rounded body. The chassis was stiffened and the engine moved forwards to give more passenger room. The rear panel, previously vertical, was now set at a sloping angle, and the manufacturers offered the option of a folding luggage grid attached to the rear panel for "two pounds, seven shillings and sixpence" (slightly under £2.40) painted. A Commer-badged estate car was added to the range.

The final pre-war model was the 1938 Minx. There were no more factory-built tourers but some were made by Carbodies. The car was visually similar to the Magnificent, with a different grille, and access to the luggage boot (trunk) was external (that on the predecessor was accessed by folding down the rear seat). There were two saloon models in the range, the basic "Safety" model with simple rexine trim instead of leather, no opening front quarter lights, and less luxurious trim levels. The De Luxe model had leather trim, opening quarter lights, extra trim pads, and various other comfort benefits. The 1938 model was not the final iteration before the outbreak of war, however, as the 1939 model was considerably different mechanically, with virtually the entire drivetrain improved to the extent that few parts are interchangeable with the 1938 model. This includes gearbox, differential, half shafts, steering box, and a great many other mechanical and cosmetic changes. Even the front grille, which to the casual eye looks almost identical to the 1938 model, became a pressed alloy component rather than a composite.

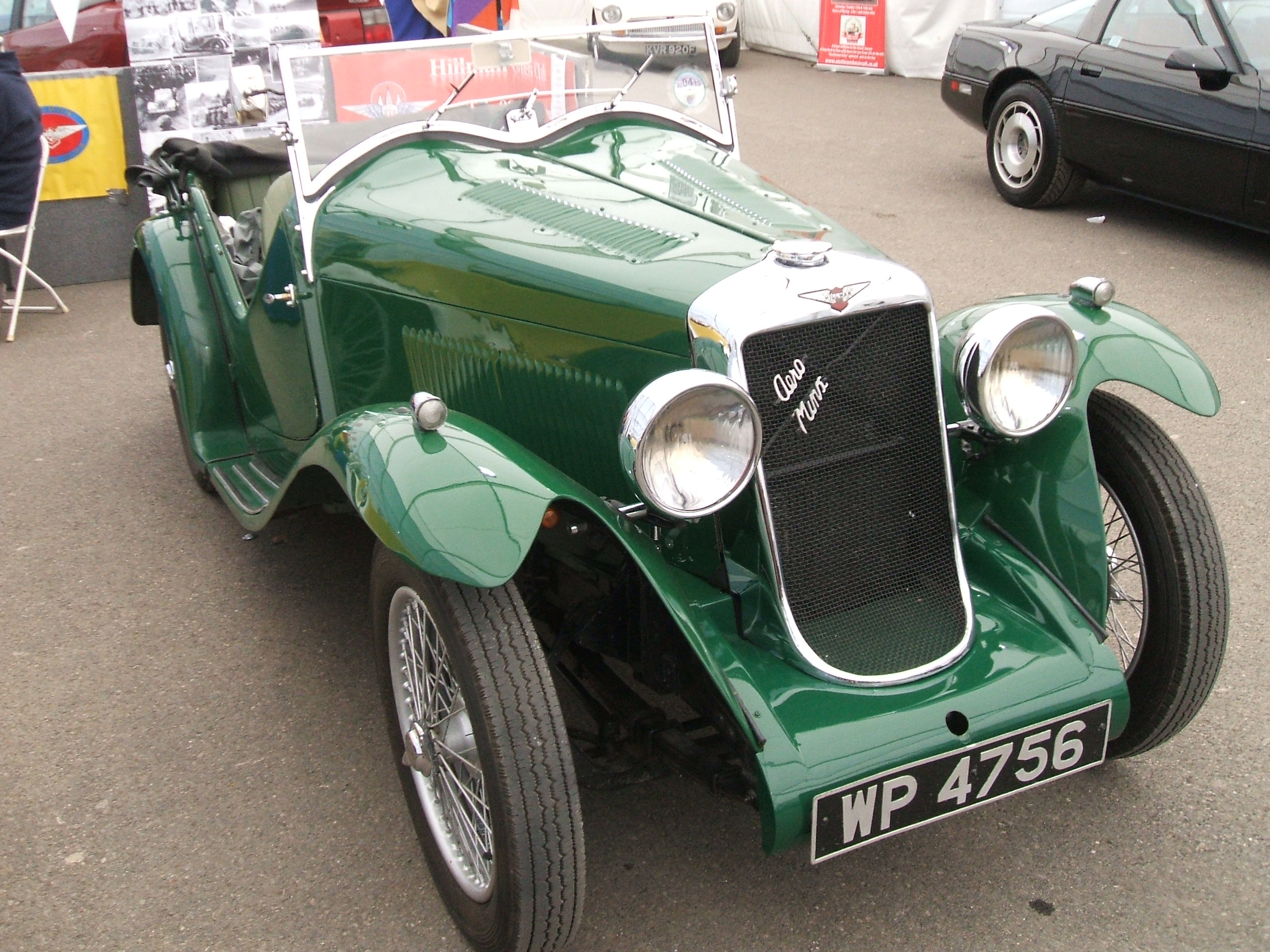
Aerominx 1933

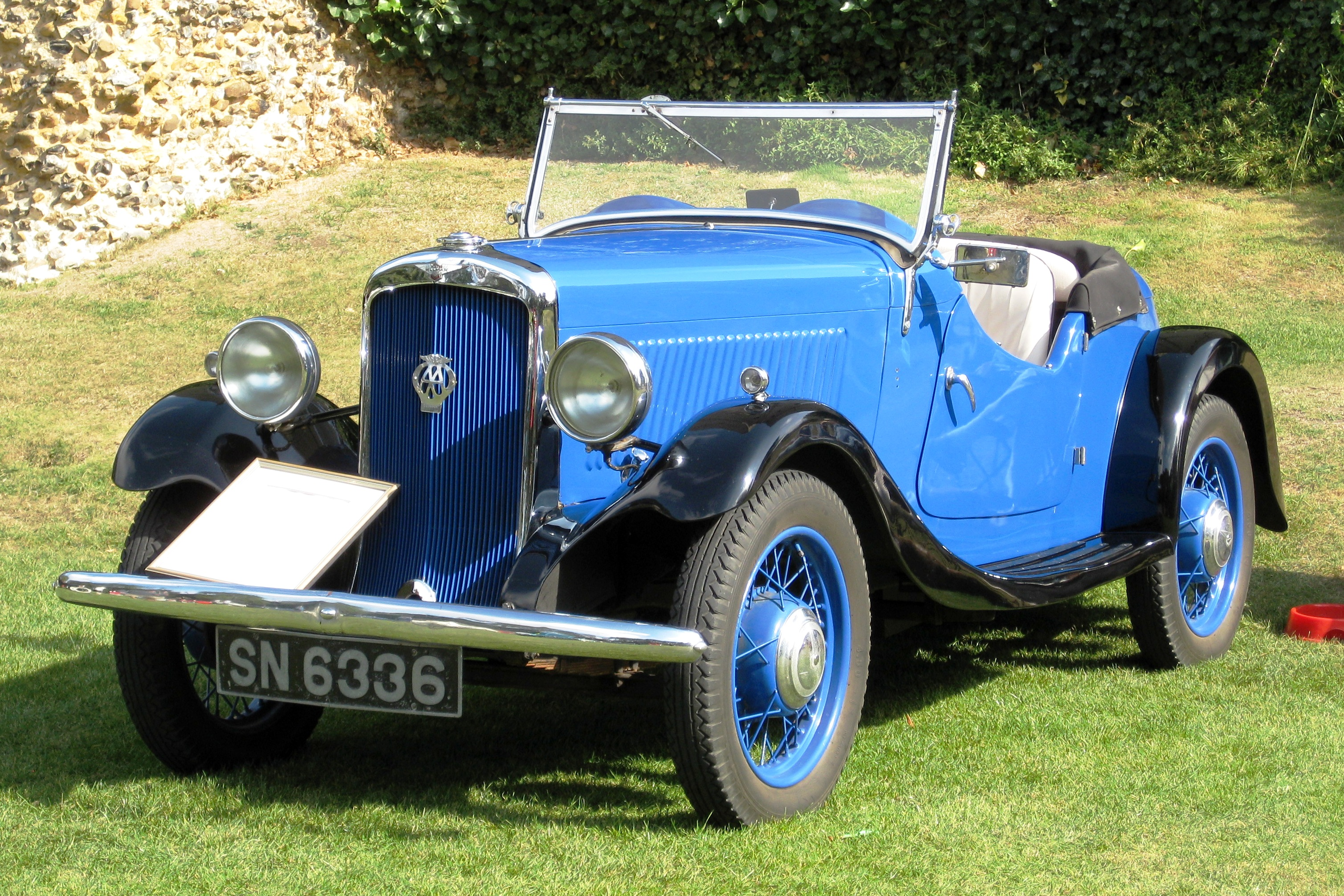
Minx sports tourer 1934

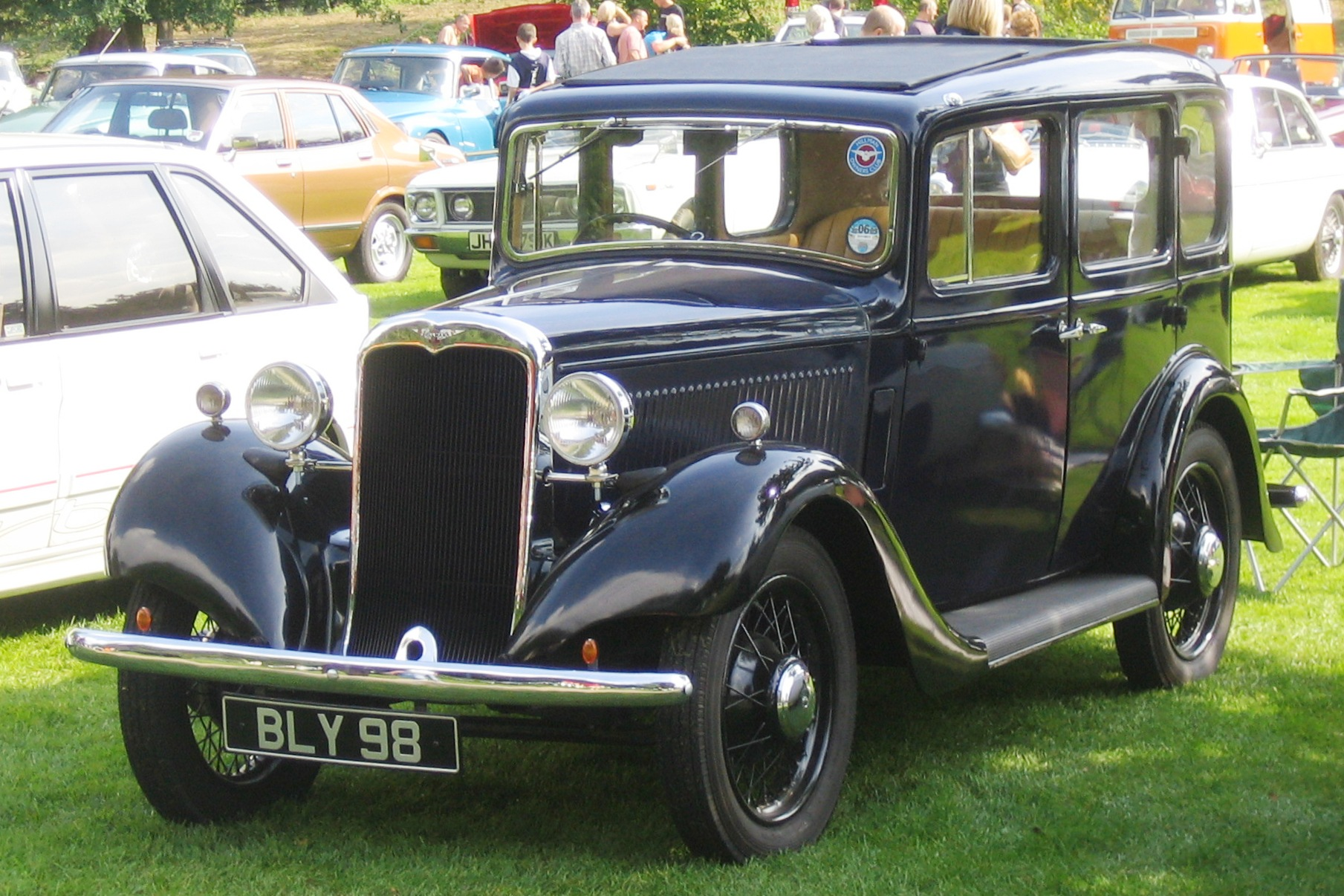
Minx 1935 the first mass-produced car with an all-synchromesh gearbox

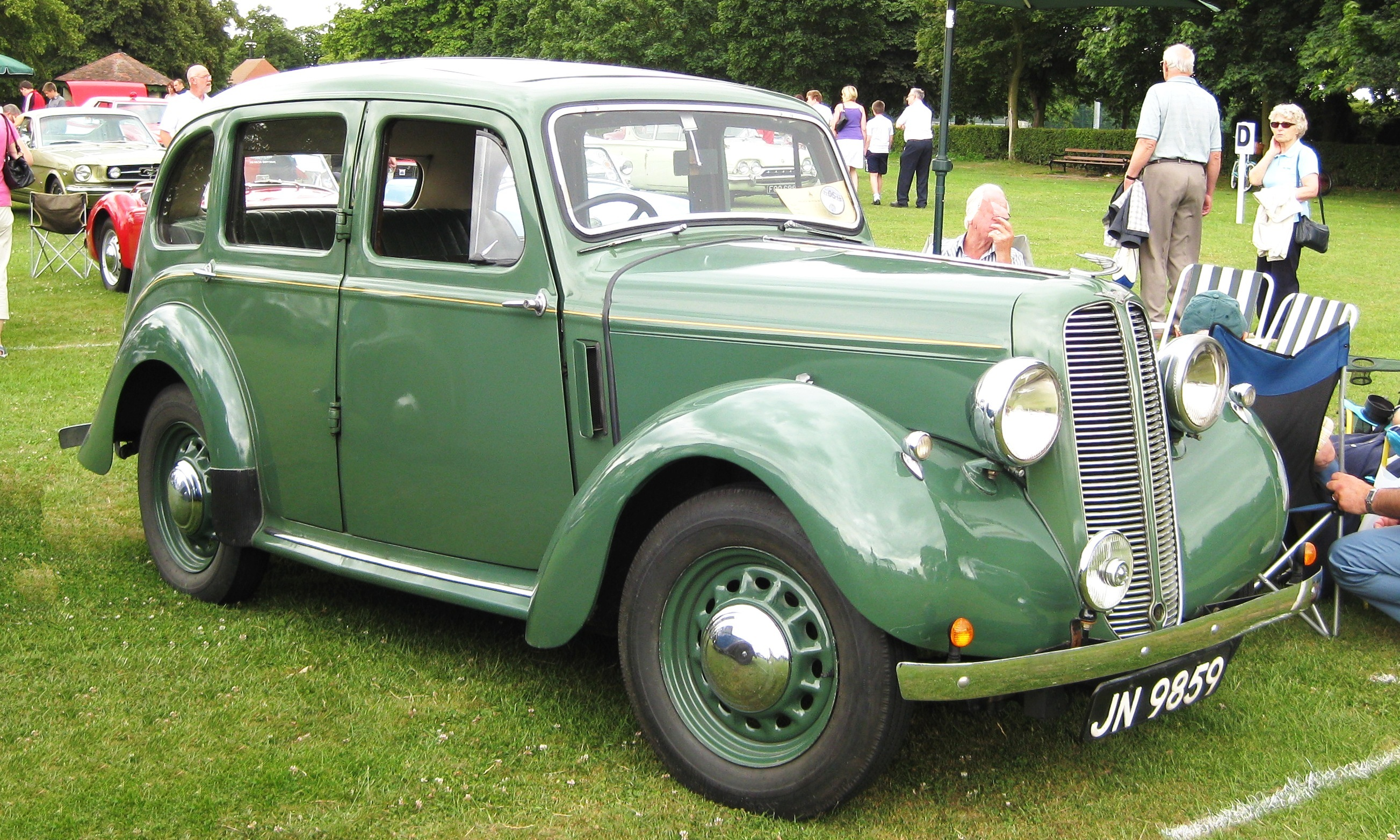
Minx 1937

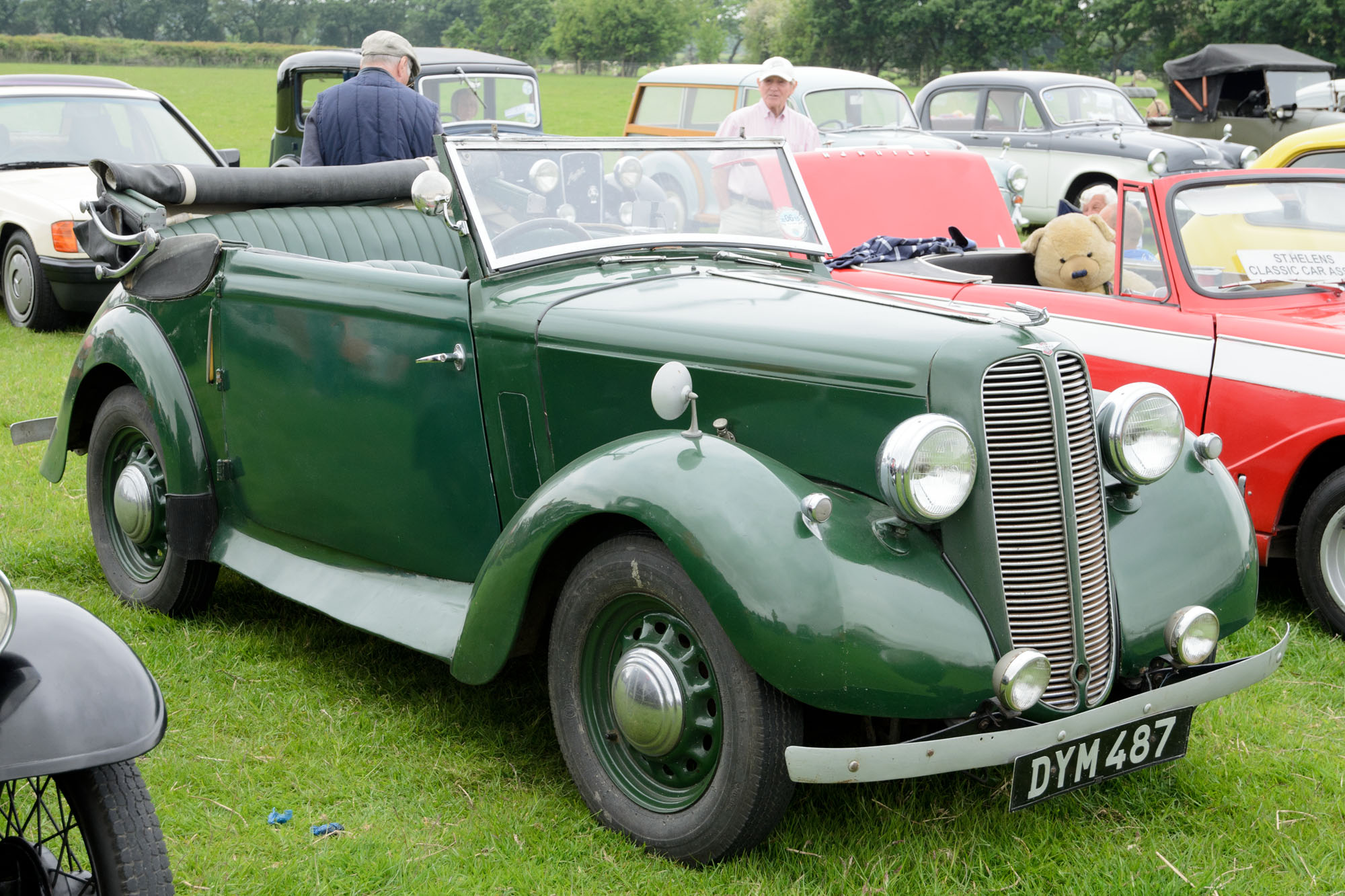
Minx tourer 1937

== Wartime Minx ==
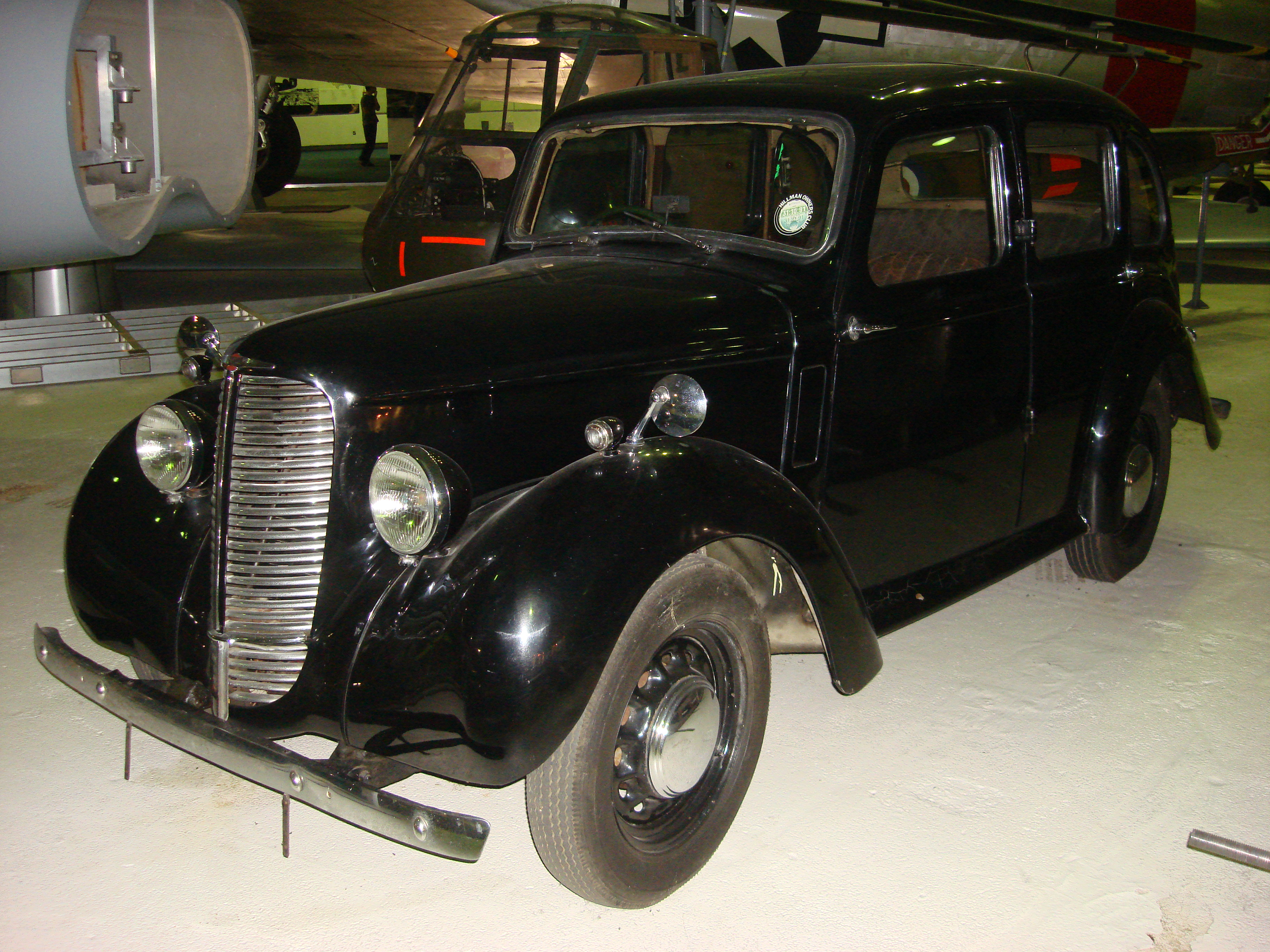
RAF staff car

During the Second World War, British car companies produced simple Utility load carriers, the Car, Light Utility or "Tilly" which was later developed into the experimental Hillman Gnat. For Hillman it was the Hillman 10HP, a Minx chassis with a two-person cab and covered load area behind. The basic saloon was also produced for military and essential civilian use from 1940 to 1944.

=== Operators ===
- United Kingdom: British Army, RAF

== Minx Mark I to VIII (1945–1957) ==
Hillman Minx Mark I to VIII
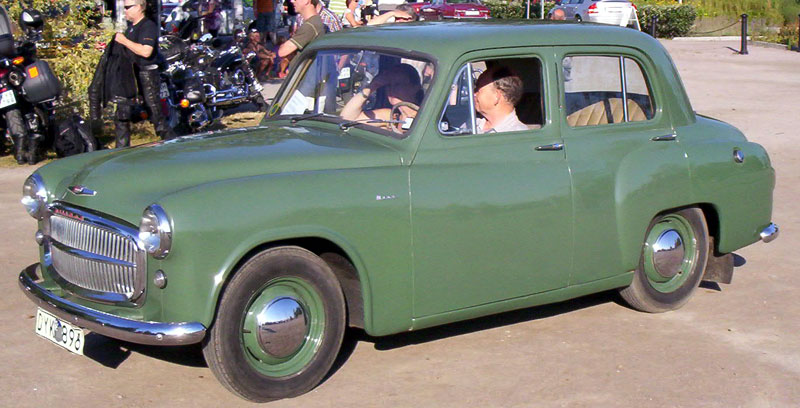
- Hillman Minx Mark VIII 4-Door Saloon

Overview
- Also called: Hillman Estate Car; Humber 10; Humber 80 (New Zealand); Isuzu Hillman Minx (Japan)
- Production: 1945–1956
- Assembly: Ryton-on-Dunsmore, England; Ōmori, Japan (Isuzu); Port Melbourne, Australia; Petone, Wellington, New Zealand (Todd Industries)

Body and chassis
- Body style: 4-door saloon 3-door estate 2-door convertible 2-door hardtop 2-door coupé utility
- Related: Hillman Husky; Commer Light Pick-up; Commer Express Delivery Van; Commer Cob

Powertrain
- Engine: 1,185 cc I4; 1,265 cc I4; 1,390 cc I4

The Minx sold between 1945 and 1947 had the same 1185 cc side-valve engine, the same wheelbase and virtually the same shape as the prewar Minx. This postwar Minx became known as the Minx Mark I (or Minx Phase I). This was the first Minx with a protruding boot (trunk) that nodded to the Ponton, three-box design by then replacing the 'flat back' look, inherited from models that had debuted in the 1930s. Between 1947 and 1948, Hillman offered a modified version they called the Minx Mark II.

A much more modern-looking Minx, the Mark III, was sold from 1948. Three different body styles were offered initially, these being saloon, estate car and drophead coupé (convertible). Beneath the metal, however, and apart from updated front suspension, little had changed: the Mark III retained the 1185 cc side-valve engine of its predecessor. Claimed power output, at 35 bhp (26.1 kW), was also unchanged. However, in 1949 the old engine was bored out and compression ratio increased, for the Minx Mark IV, to 1265 cc, and power output increased by 7 per cent to 37.5 bhp (28.0 kW). A Mark IV saloon tested by The Motor magazine in 1949 had a top speed of 67 mph (108 km/h) and could accelerate from 0–60 mph (97 km/h) in 39.7 seconds. A fuel consumption of 32.1 miles per imperial gallon (8.8 L/100 km; 26.7 mpg_{‑US}) was recorded. The test car cost £505 including taxes, the price including radio (£36), over-riders (£5) and heater (£18).

The Mark V, introduced in 1951, featured side chromium trim and a floor-mounted handbrake. It also featured vertical chrome strips on either side of the front grille.

The Mark VI of 1953 featured a new grille, revised combustion chambers and a two-spoke steering wheel. A fourth body variation was added, badged as the Hillman Minx Californian, a two-door hard-top coupé with, slightly unusually, a b-pillar that wound down out of sight along with the rear side window to give an unbroken window line when all windows were fully opened: the rear window assembly was of a three-piece wrap-around form. The wheelbase and overall length of the car remained the same as those of the four-door saloon and convertible permutations. The Mark VII, also introduced in 1953, featured longer rear mudguards and a bigger boot. For the Mark VIII, in 1954, a new ohv 1390 cc engine was installed. This engine, two years later, went into the first of the new "Audax series" Minxes.

For a short time in the early 1950s, Hillman Minxes were sold in the US to Americans seeking better gas mileage. American reviews of the vehicle were lukewarm.

The Mark VI to Mark VIII was produced in Japan by Isuzu between 1953 and 1956, as the Isuzu Hillman Minx, prior to their 1961 introduction of the Bellel.

A 2-door coupé utility variant of the Minx Mark VIII was produced by Rootes Australia as the Hillman de luxe Utility, circa 1956.

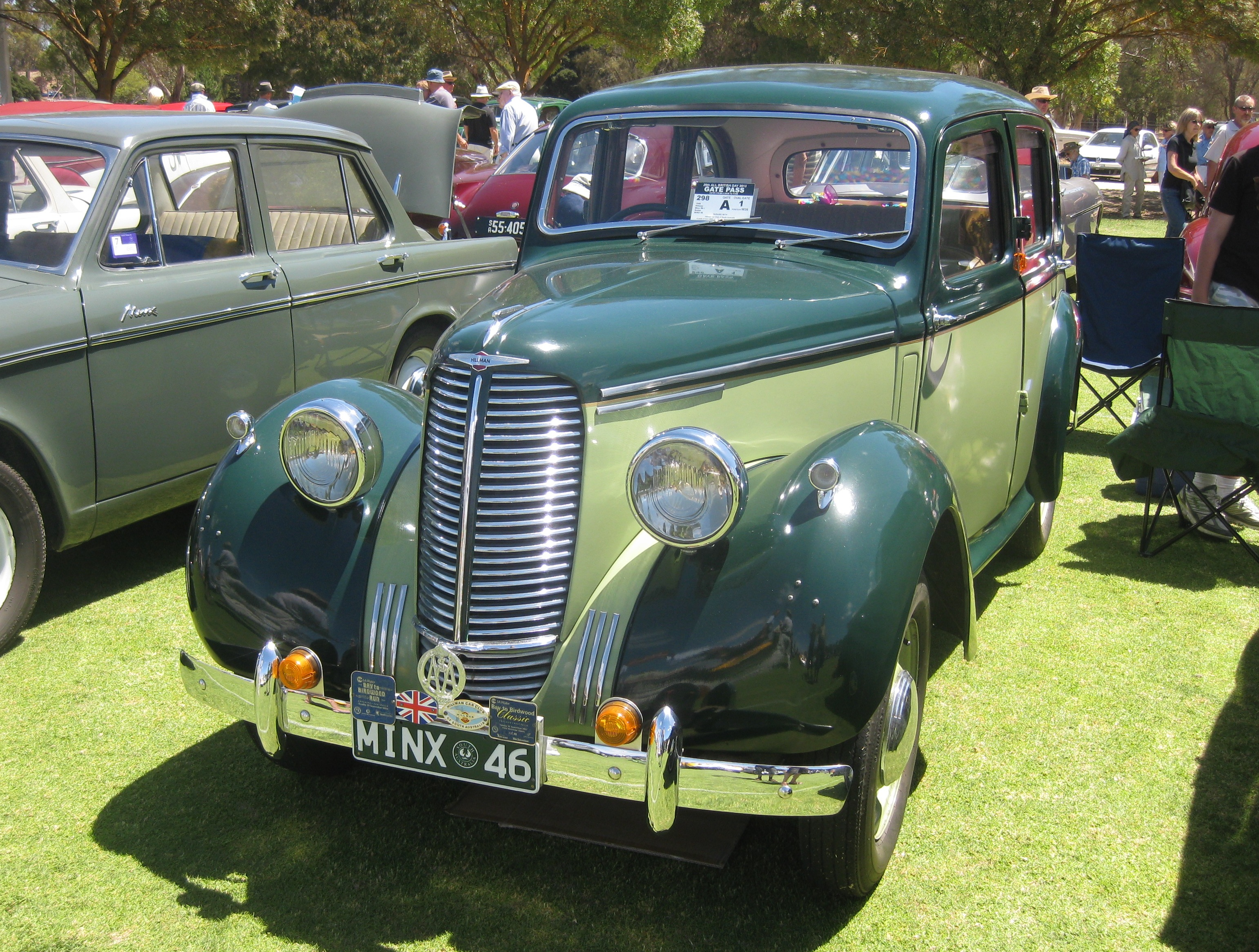
1946 Hillman Minx Mark I saloon

1947 Hillman Minx Mark I drophead coupé

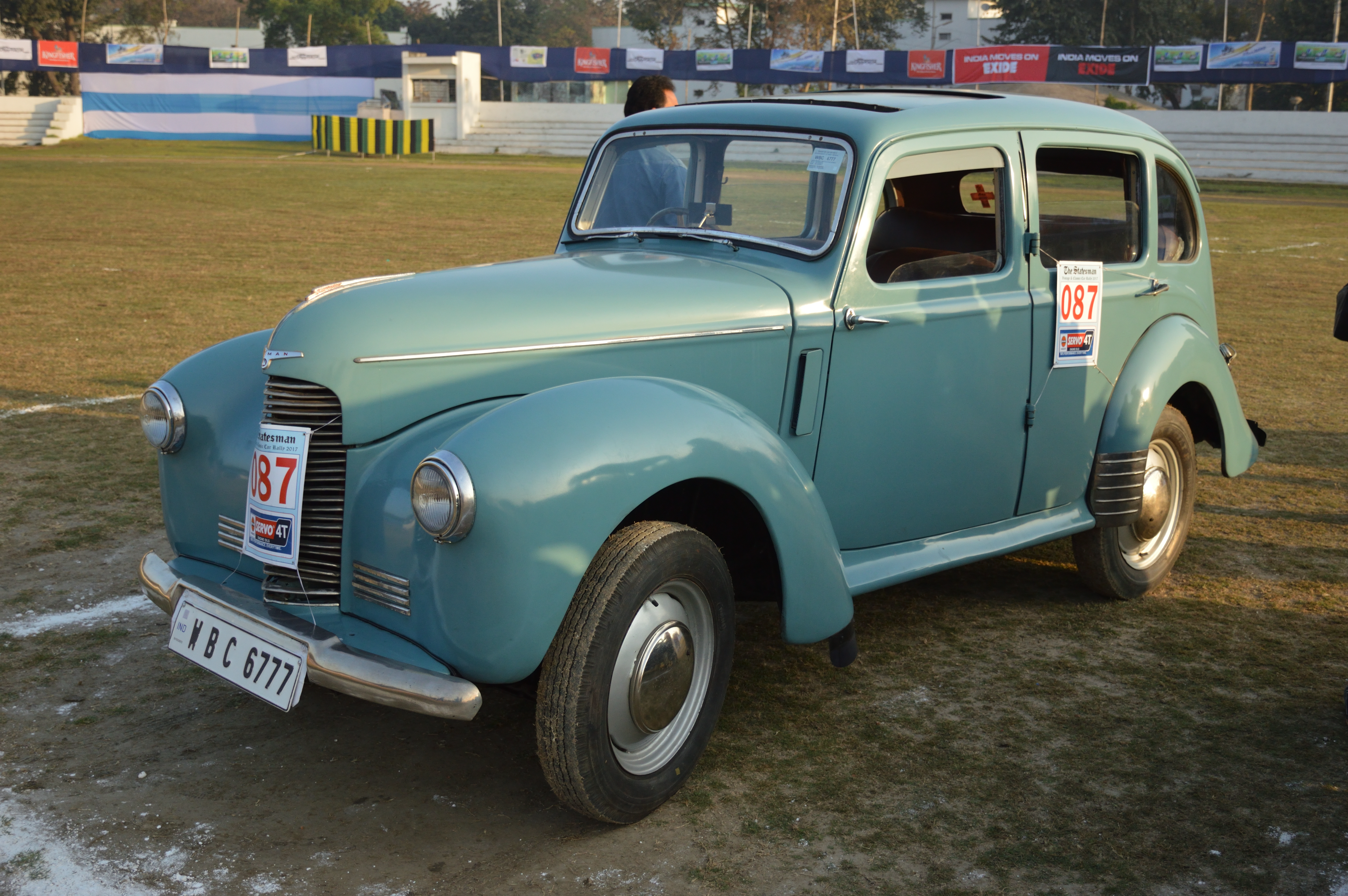
1948 Hillman Minx Mark II Saloon

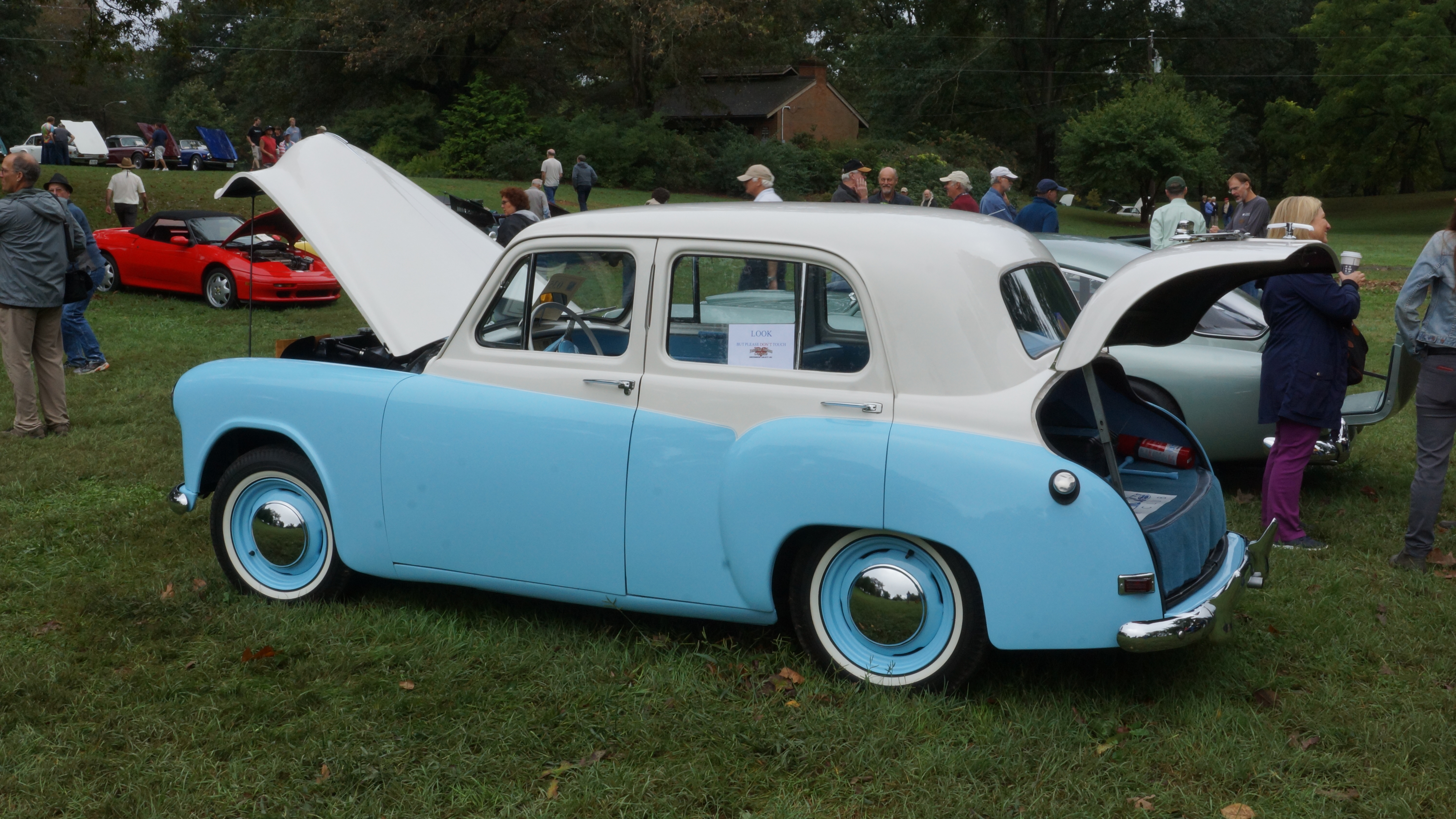
Hillman Minx Mark III Saloon

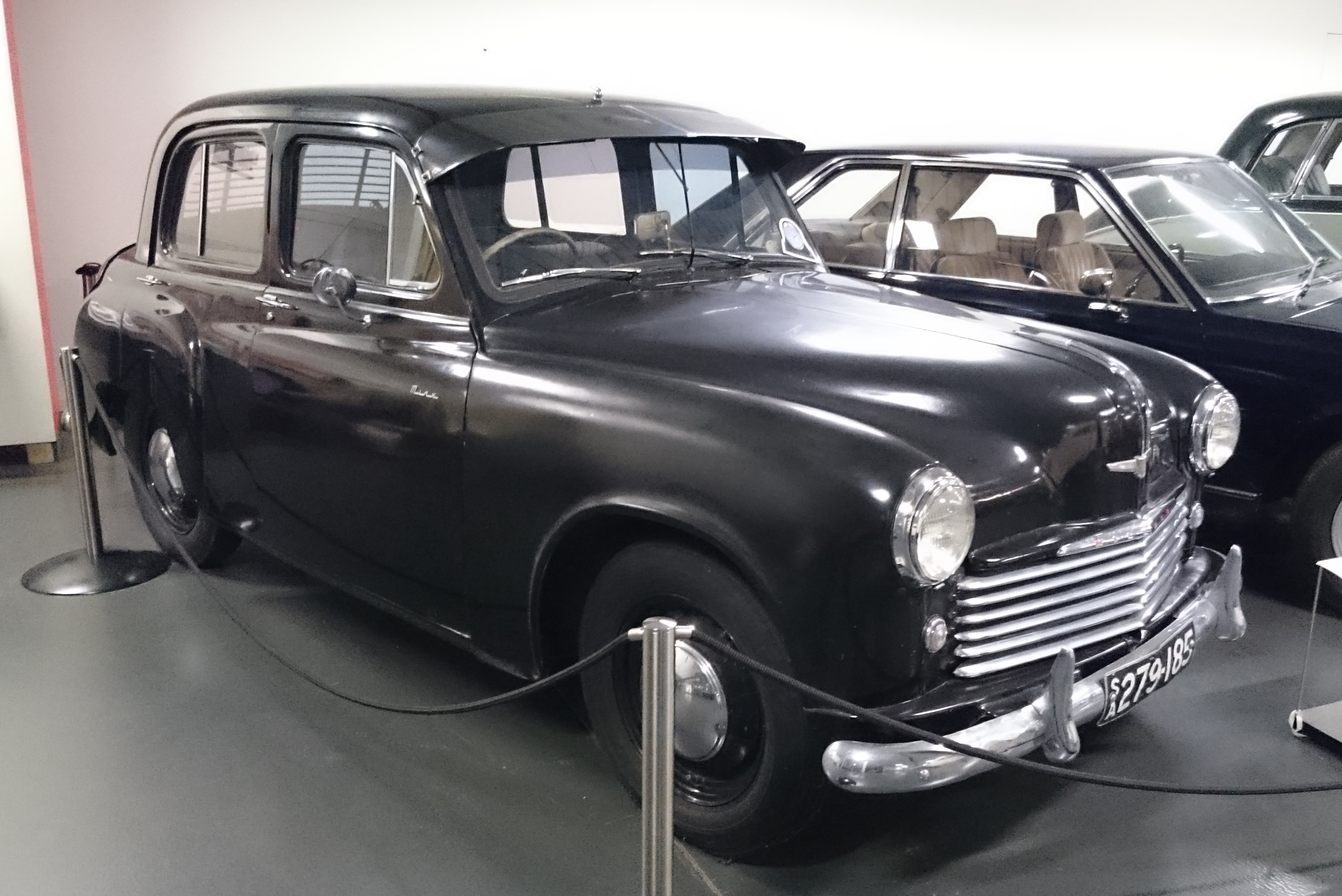
Hillman Minx Mark IV Saloon (1949)

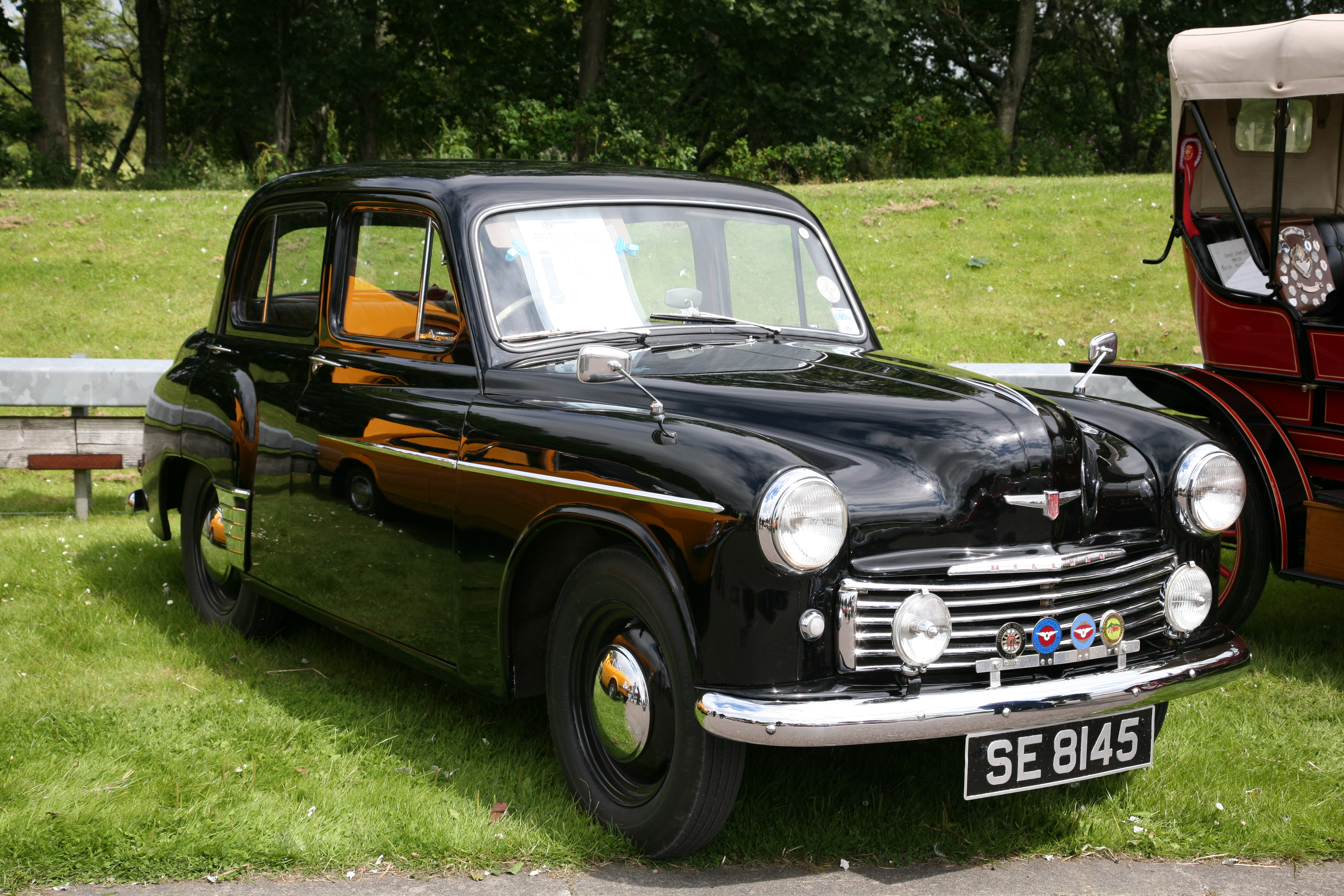
1953 Hillman Minx Mark V

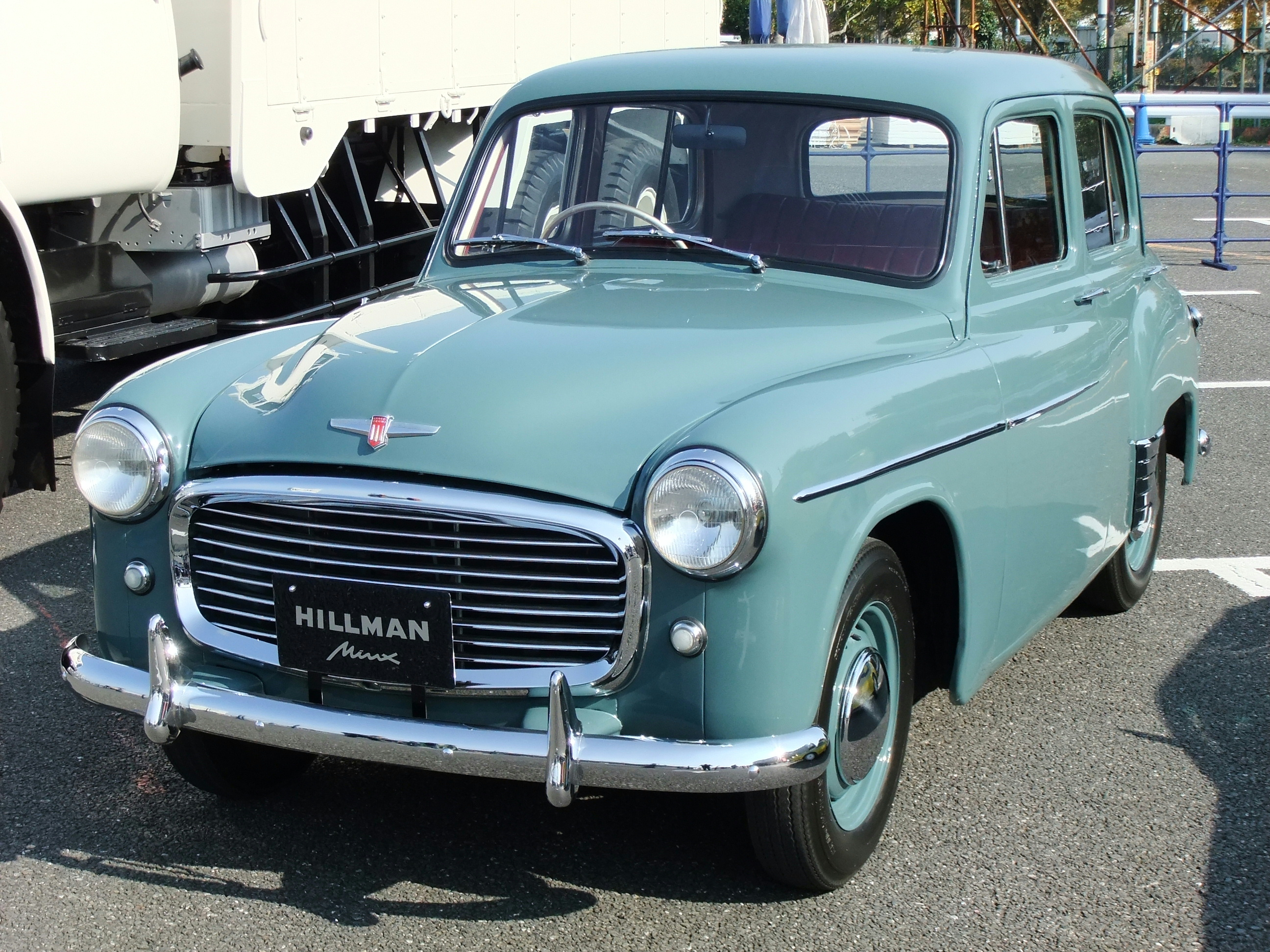
Hillman Minx Mark VI (produced by Isuzu)

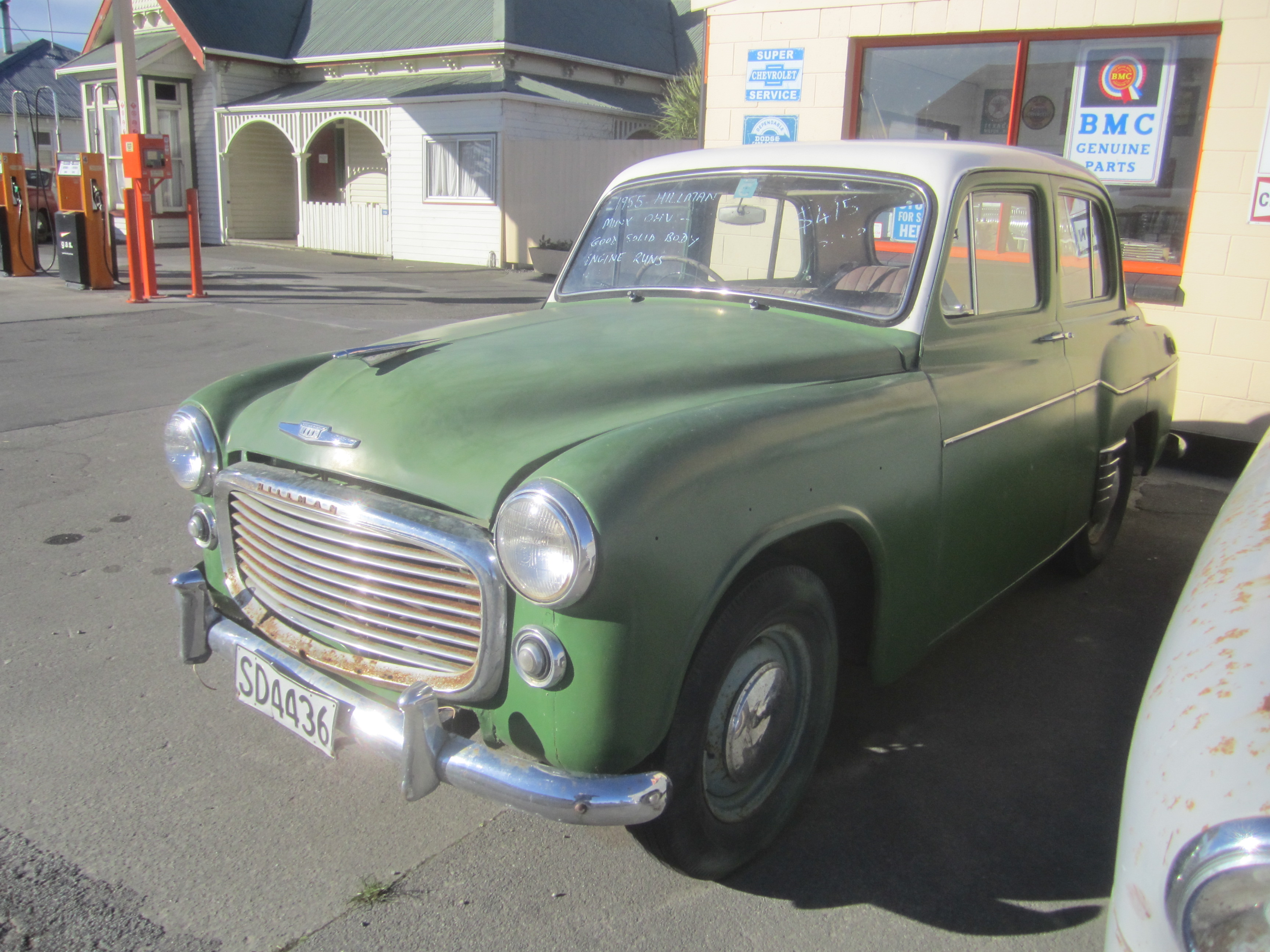
1954 Hillman Minx Mark VII

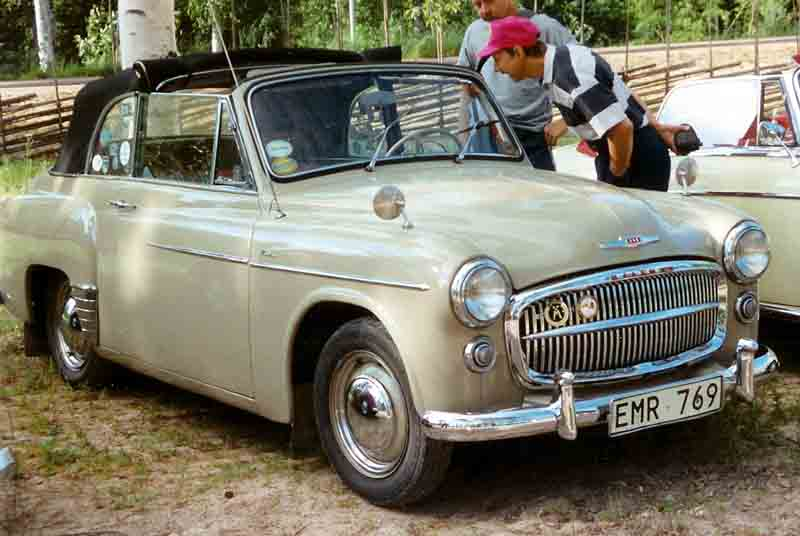
Hillman Minx Mark VIII drophead coupé ca 1955

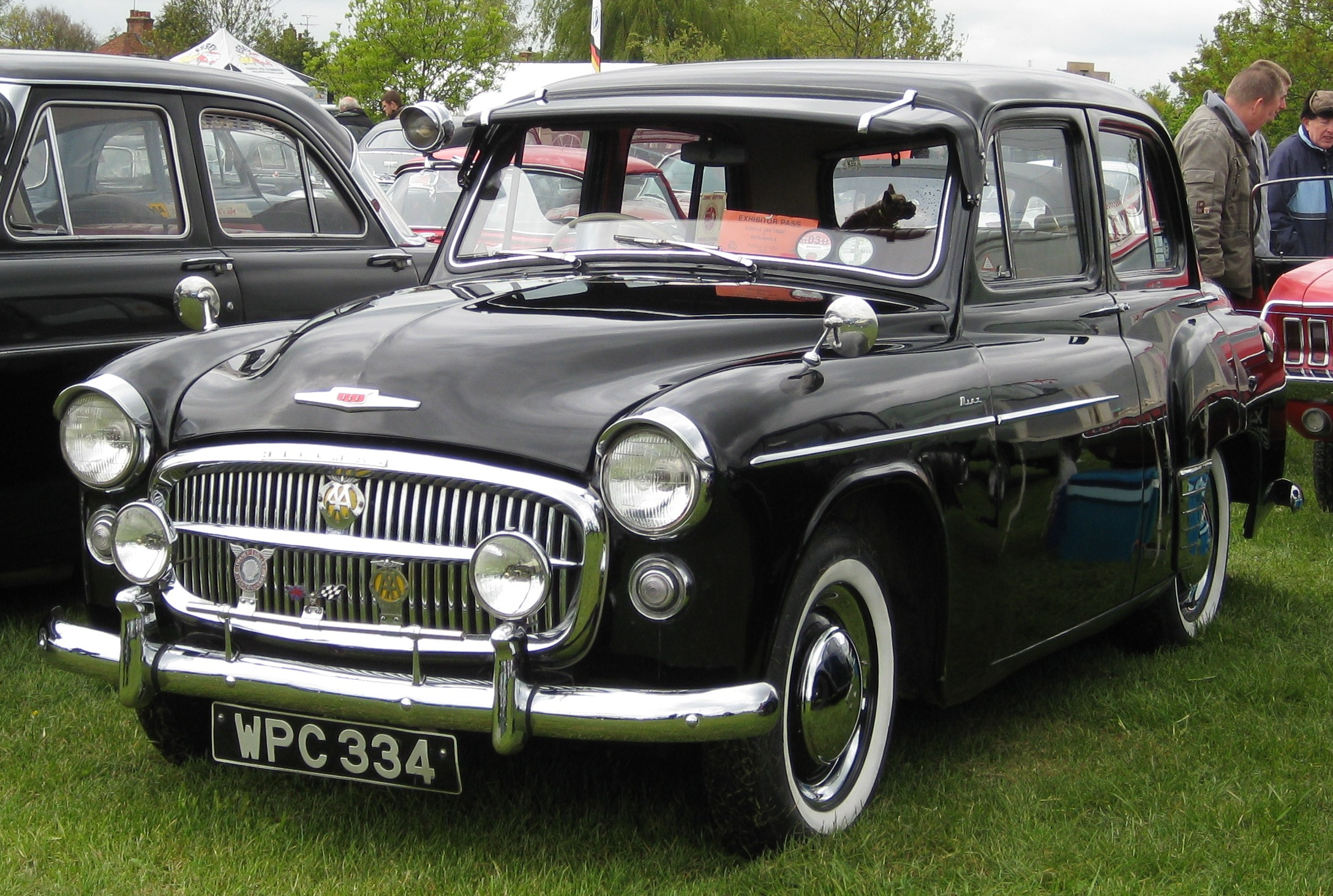
Hillman Minx Mark VIII
4-door saloon 1955

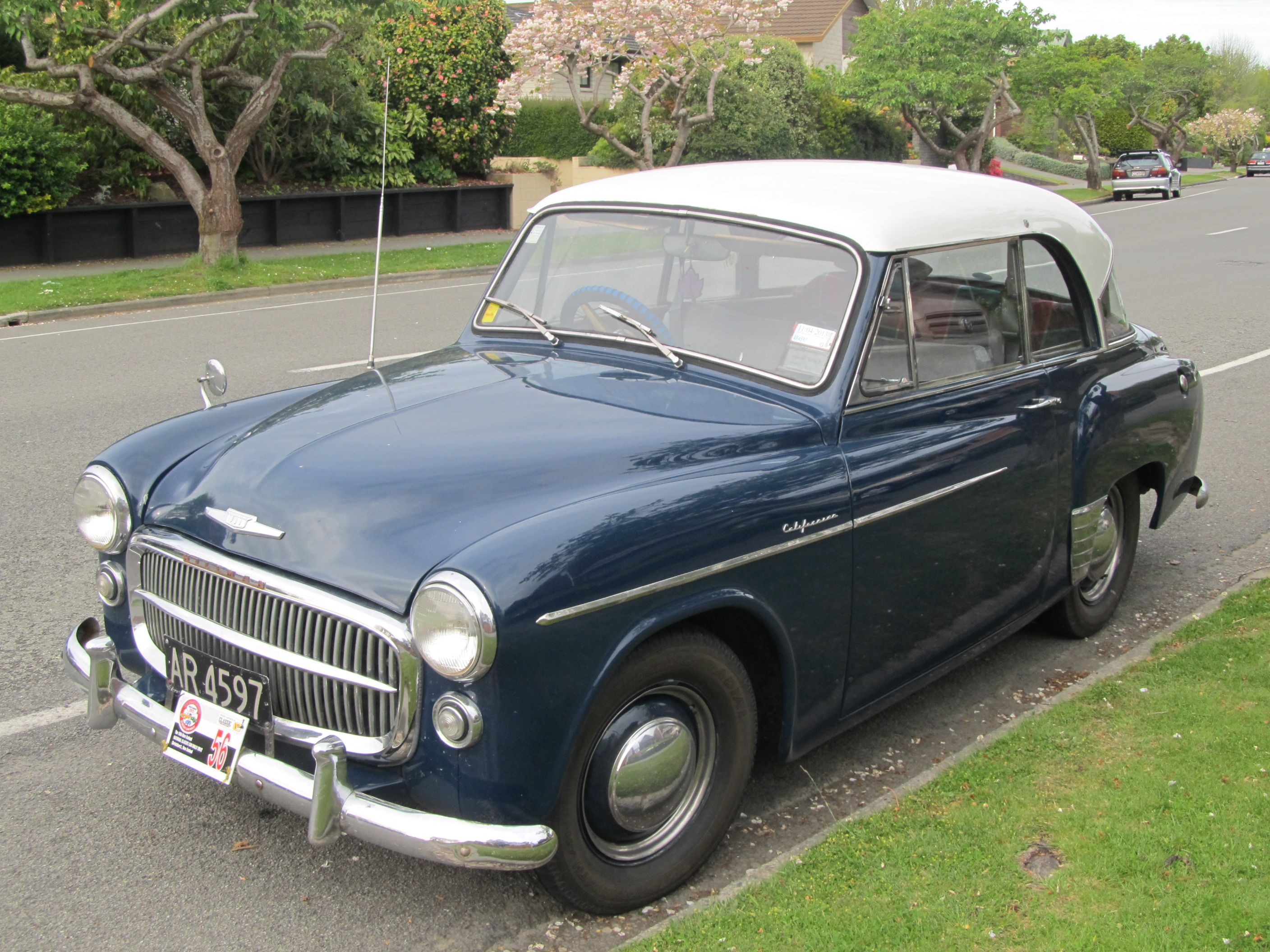
Hillman Minx Californian Mark VIII

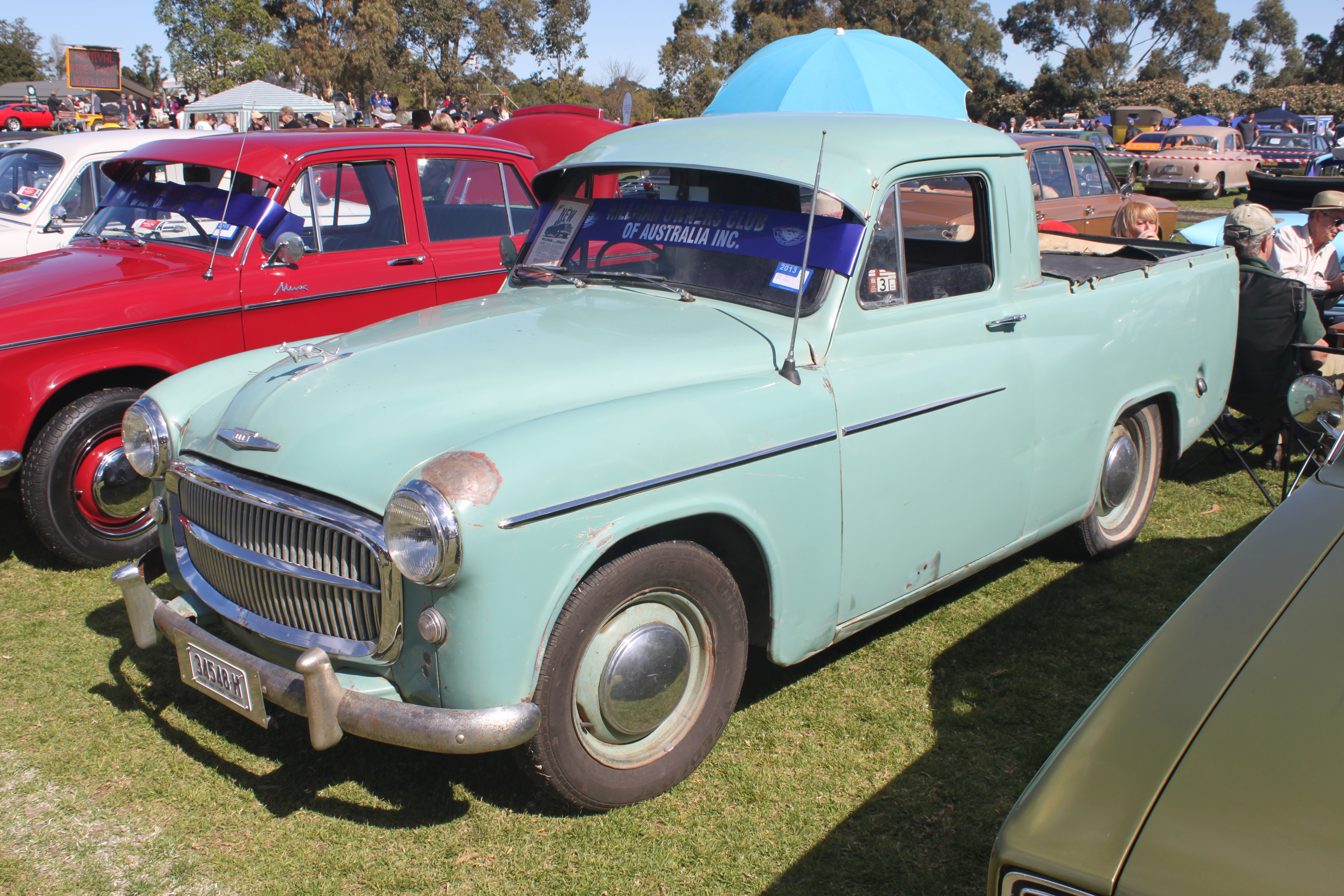
Hillman de luxe Utility Mark VIII

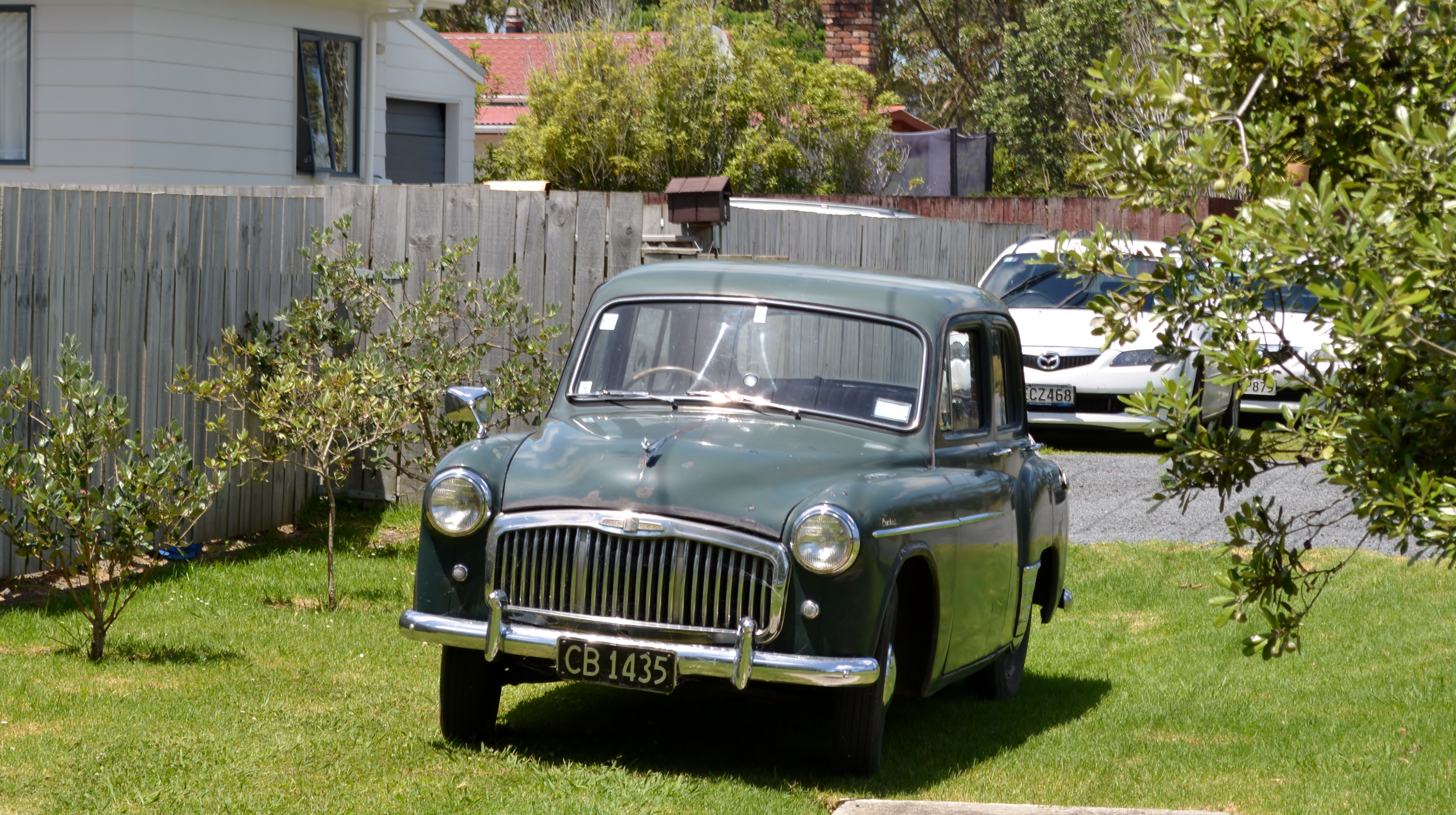
1954 Humber 10 (Minx rebranded for New Zealand's Humber dealers)

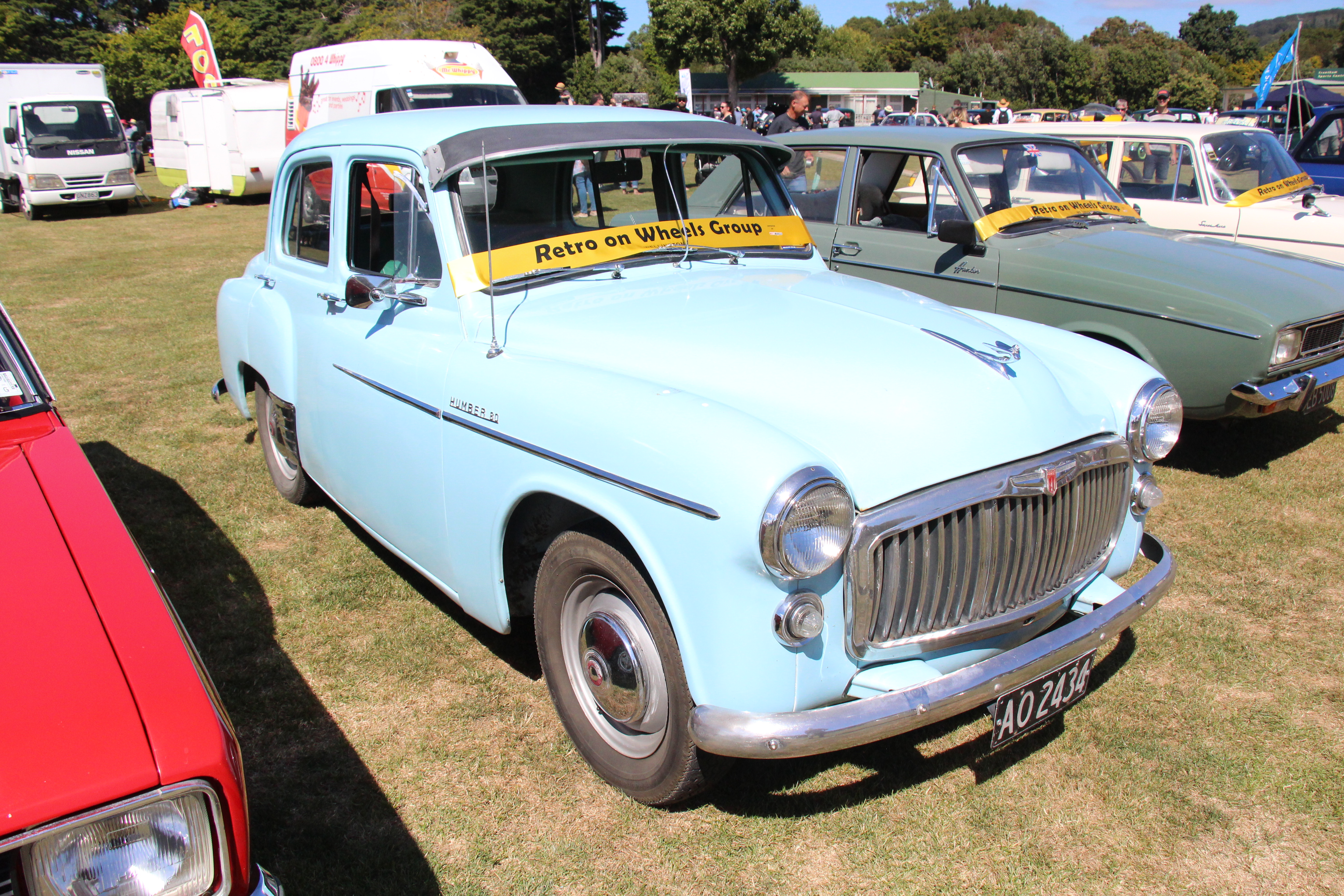
1955 Humber 80 (Minx rebranded for New Zealand market)

== Audax design Hillman Minx (Series I to Series VI, 1956–1967) ==
Hillman Minx Series I to Series VI
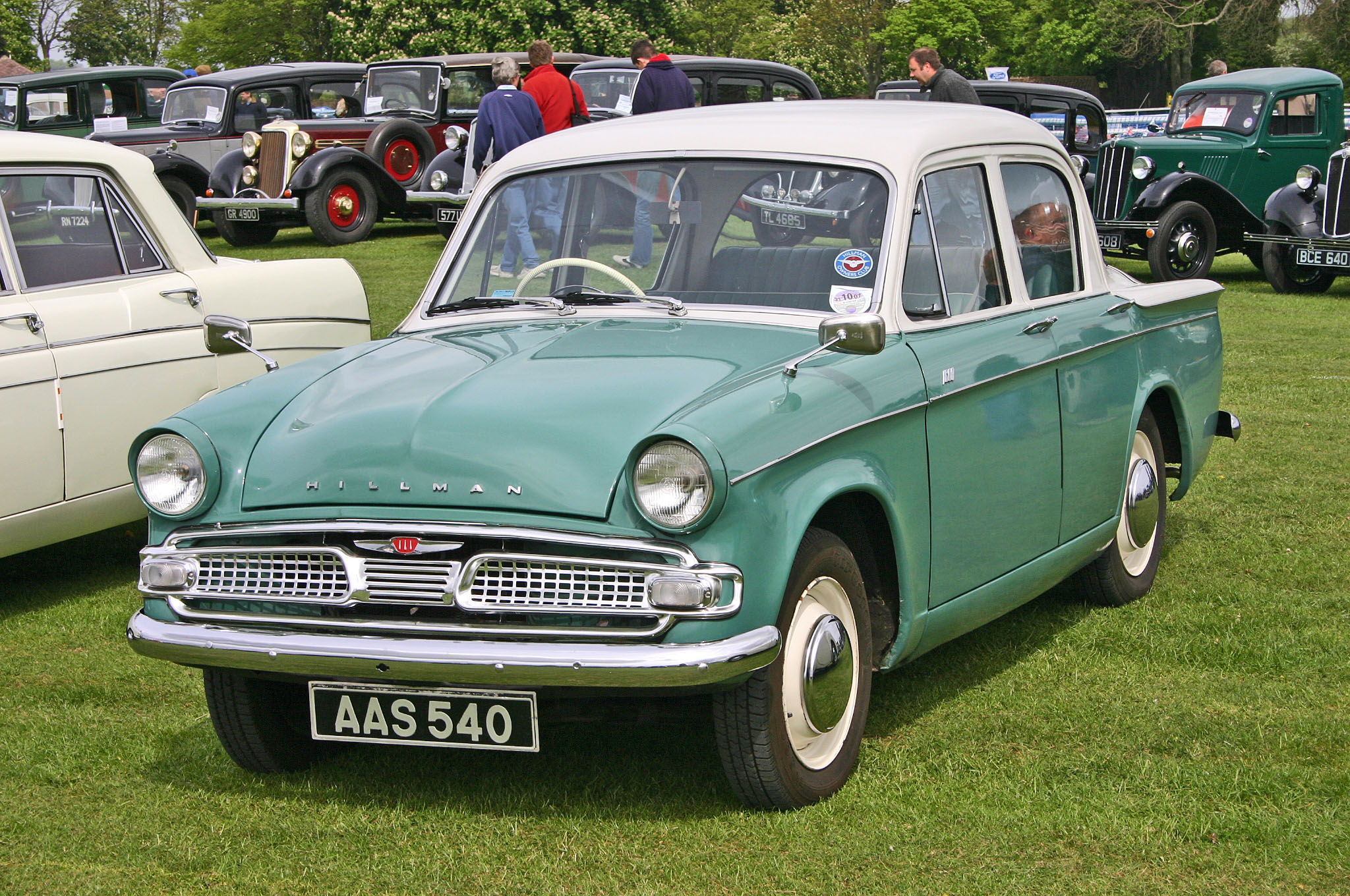
- Hillman Minx Series IIIC Saloon

Overview
- Also called: Sunbeam Minx; Humber 80; Isuzu Hillman Minx (Japan)
- Production: 1956–1967
- Assembly: Ryton-on-Dunsmore, England; Ōmori, Japan (Isuzu); Port Melbourne, Australia; Petone, Wellington, New Zealand (Todd Industries)

Body and chassis
- Body style: 4-door saloon 2-door convertible 4-door estate
- Related: Commer Cob; Hillman Gazelle; Hillman Husky; Singer Gazelle; Sunbeam Rapier

Powertrain
- Engine: 1,390 cc I4; 1,494 cc I4; 1,592 cc I4; 1,725 cc I4

Chronology
- Successor: Hillman New Minx

The Audax body was designed by the Rootes Group, but helped by the Raymond Loewy design organisation, who were involved in the design of Studebaker coupés in 1953. Announced in May 1956 the car went through a succession of annual facelifts each given a series number, replacing the mark number used on the previous Minxes. The Series I, introduced in 1956, was followed by the Series II in 1957, the Series III in 1958, the Series IIIA in 1959, the Series IIIB in 1960, the Series IIIC in 1961, the Series V in 1963 and the Series VI in 1965. There was no Series IV. Over the years the engine was increased in capacity from 1390 cc (in the Series I and II) to 1725 cc in the Series VI. A variety of manual transmissions, with column or floor change, and automatic transmissions were offered. For the automatic version, the Series I and Series II used a Lockheed Manumatic two-pedal system (really only a semi-automatic), the Series III a Smiths Easidrive, which was the first production dual-clutch transmission, while the V/VI a Borg Warner. The Series VI was fitted with an all-synchromesh gearbox.

A Series III deLuxe saloon with 1494 cc engine tested by the British magazine The Motor in 1958 had a top speed of 76.9 mph (123.8 km/h) and could accelerate from 0–60 mph (97 km/h) in 25.4 seconds. A fuel consumption of 31.8 miles per imperial gallon (8.9 L/100 km; 26.5 mpg_{‑US}) was recorded. The test car cost £794 including taxes of £265.

There were Singer Gazelle and Sunbeam Rapier variants of all these Hillman Minx models and the names were again used on derivatives in the later Rootes Arrow range. Some models were re-badged in certain markets, with the Sunbeam and Humber marques used for some exports.

The New Zealand importer/assembler Todd Motors created the Humber 80 and Humber 90, badge-engineered models based respectively on the Minx and Super Minx, to give Humber dealers a smaller car to sell alongside the locally assembled Hawk and Super Snipe. Although the 90 was identical to the Super Minx apart from badging, the cheaper 80 featured a horizontal bar grille design. The Humber 80 was acknowledged in the 1980s Roger Hall play Prisoners of Mother England, in which a newly arrived immigrant in New Zealand spots one and exclaims: "Humber 80? There's no such car!"

In Australia, a Series Va model was released in 1965. It was fitted with a more powerful 1592cc engine and the all-synchromesh gearbox destined for the forthcoming Series VI model.

The Audax Minx was also built in Japan by Isuzu Motors as the Isuzu Hillman Minx, under licence from Rootes, between September 1956 and June 1964. Isuzu produced their own unique estate car version, the Isuzu Hillman Express, from 1958 to 1964.

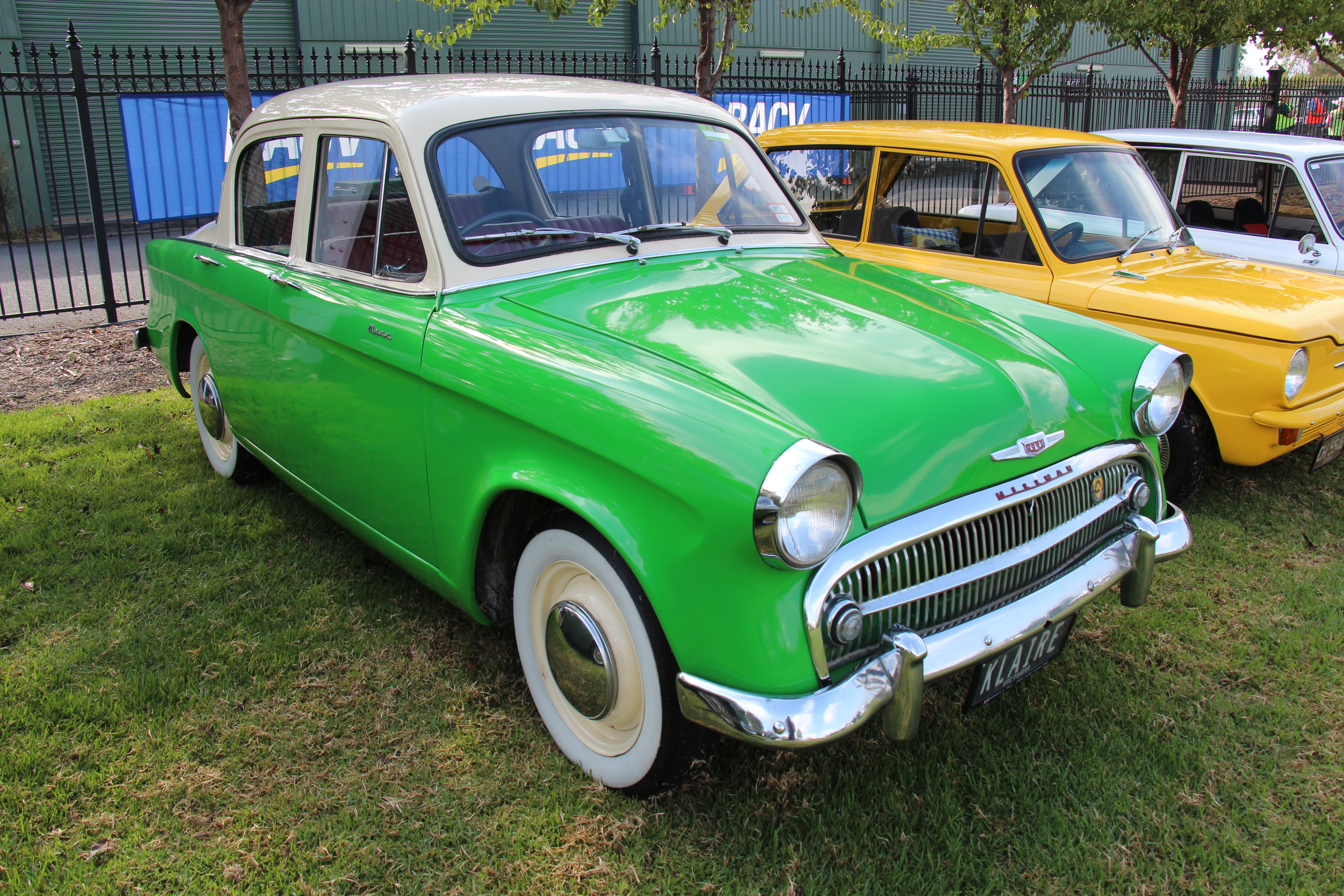
Hillman Minx Series I Saloon

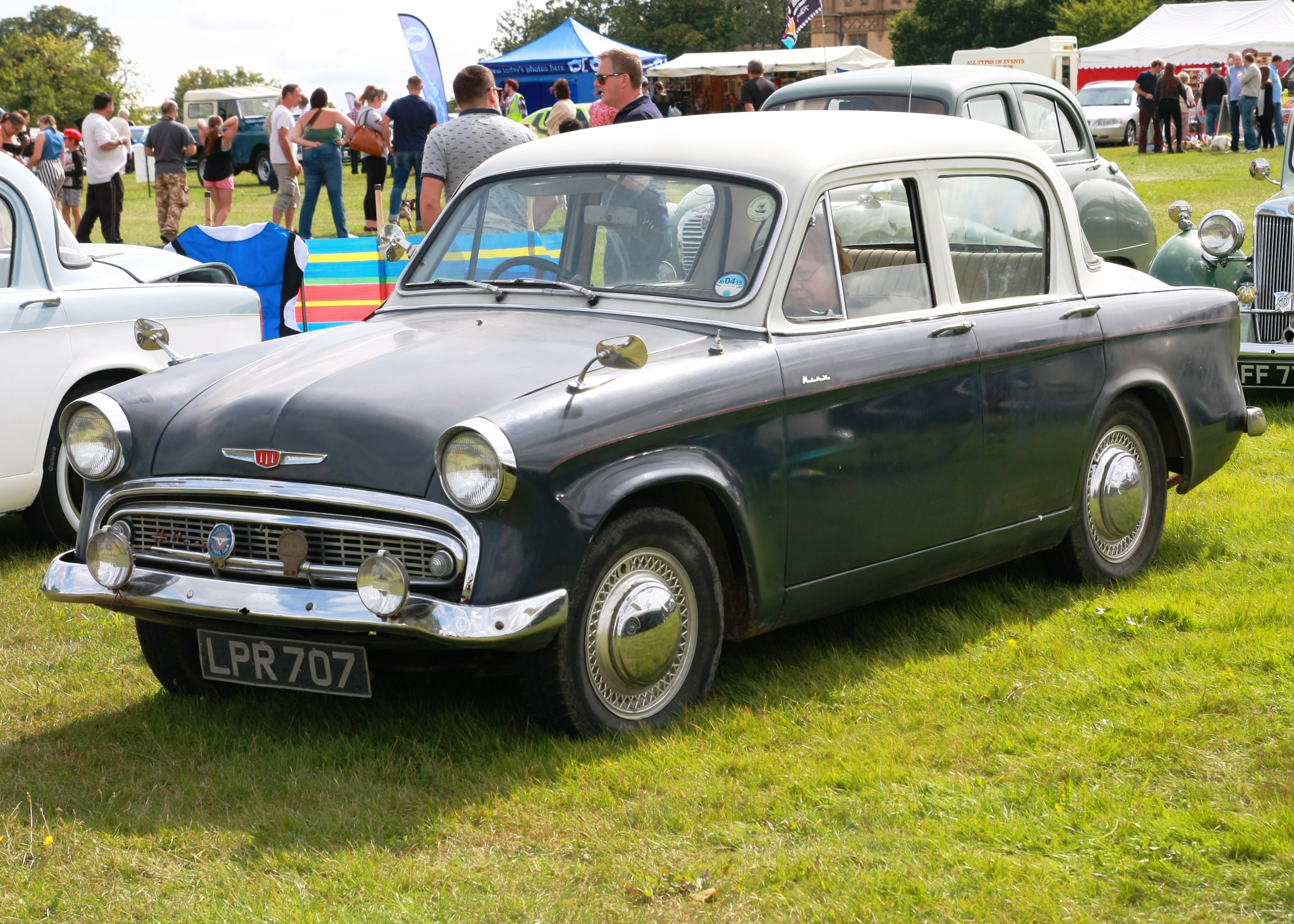
Hillman Minx Series II Saloon

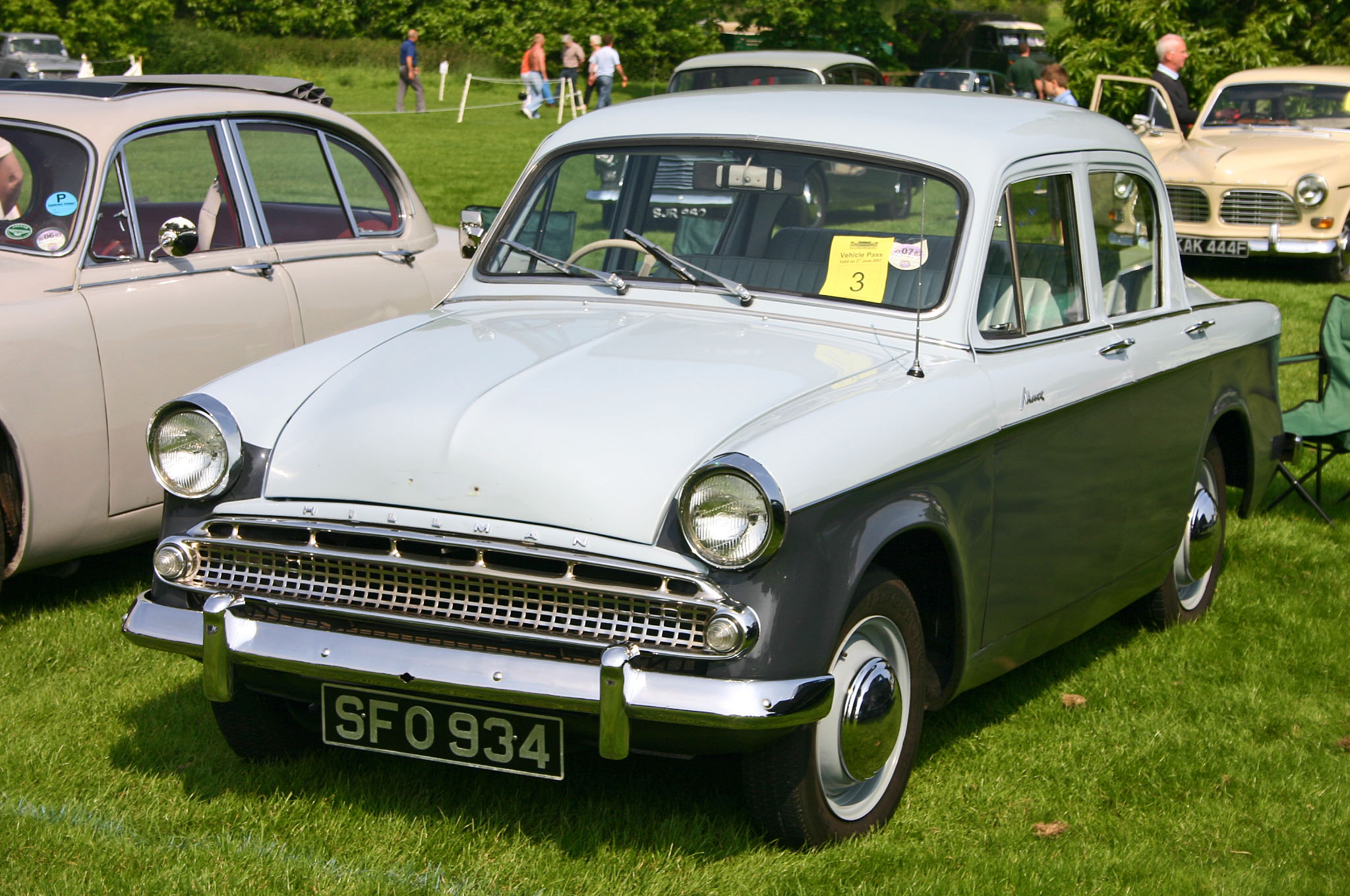
Hillman Minx Series III Saloon

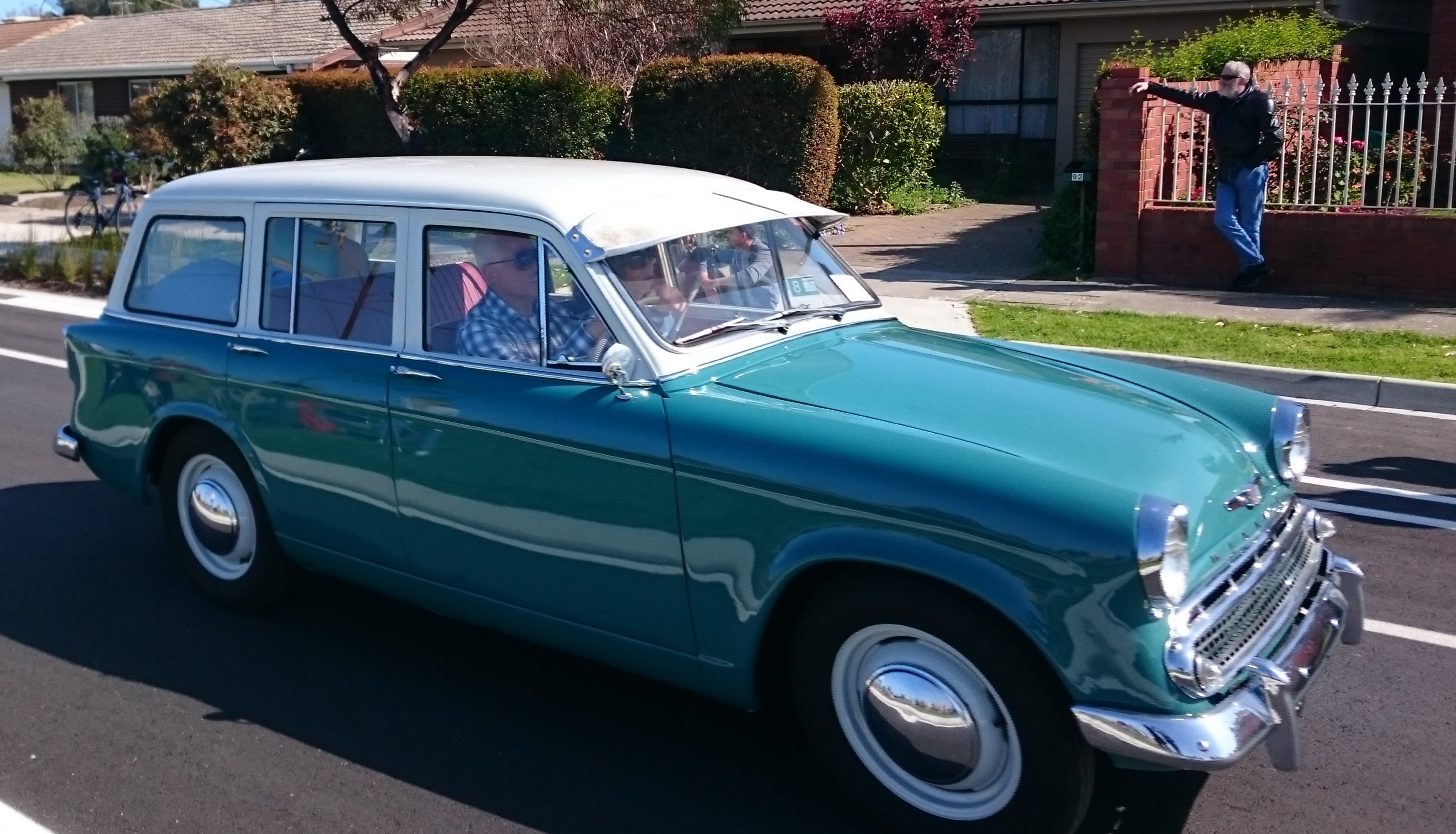
Hillman Minx Series III Estate Car

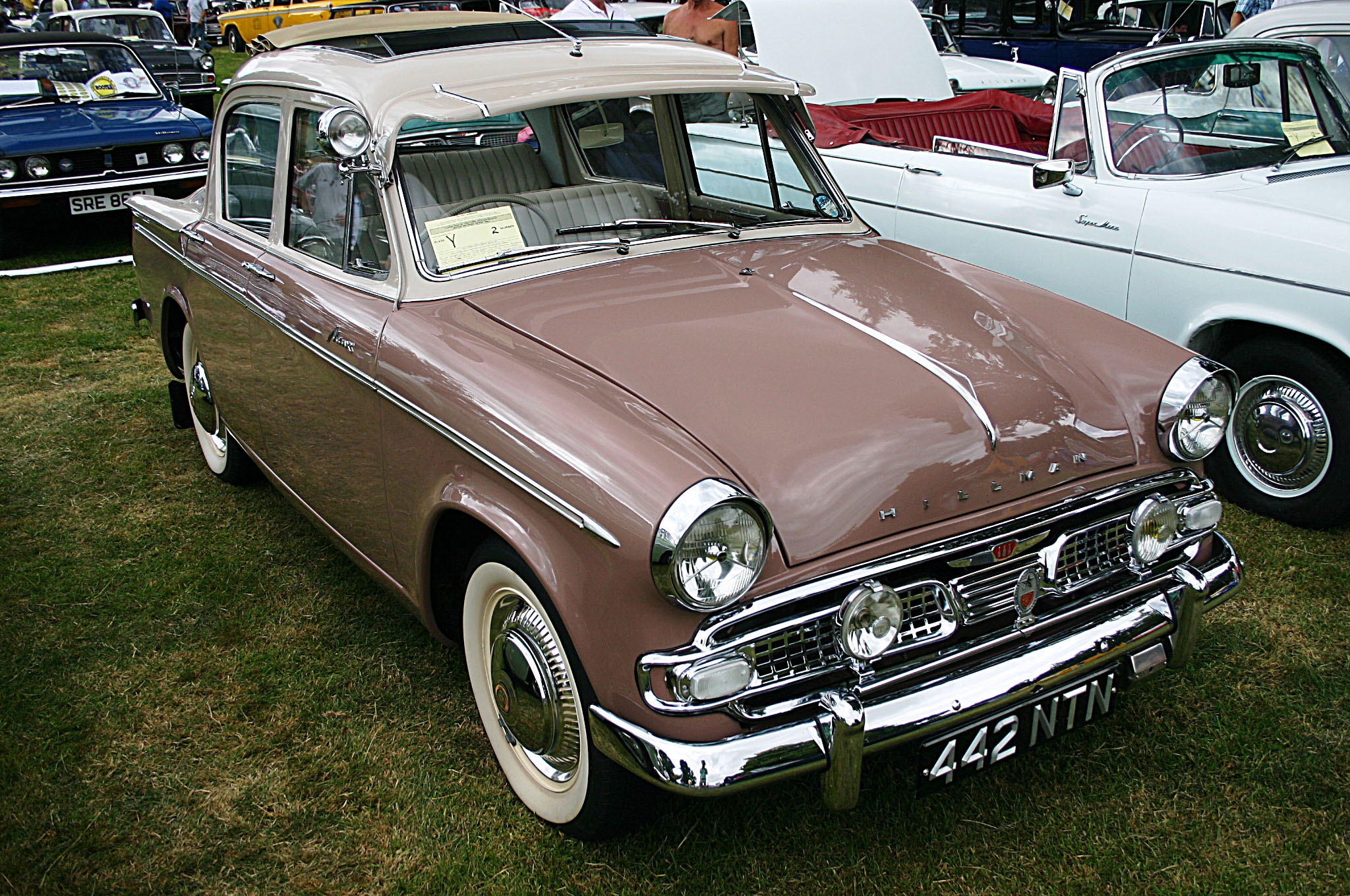
Hillman Minx Series IIIA Saloon - chrome grille

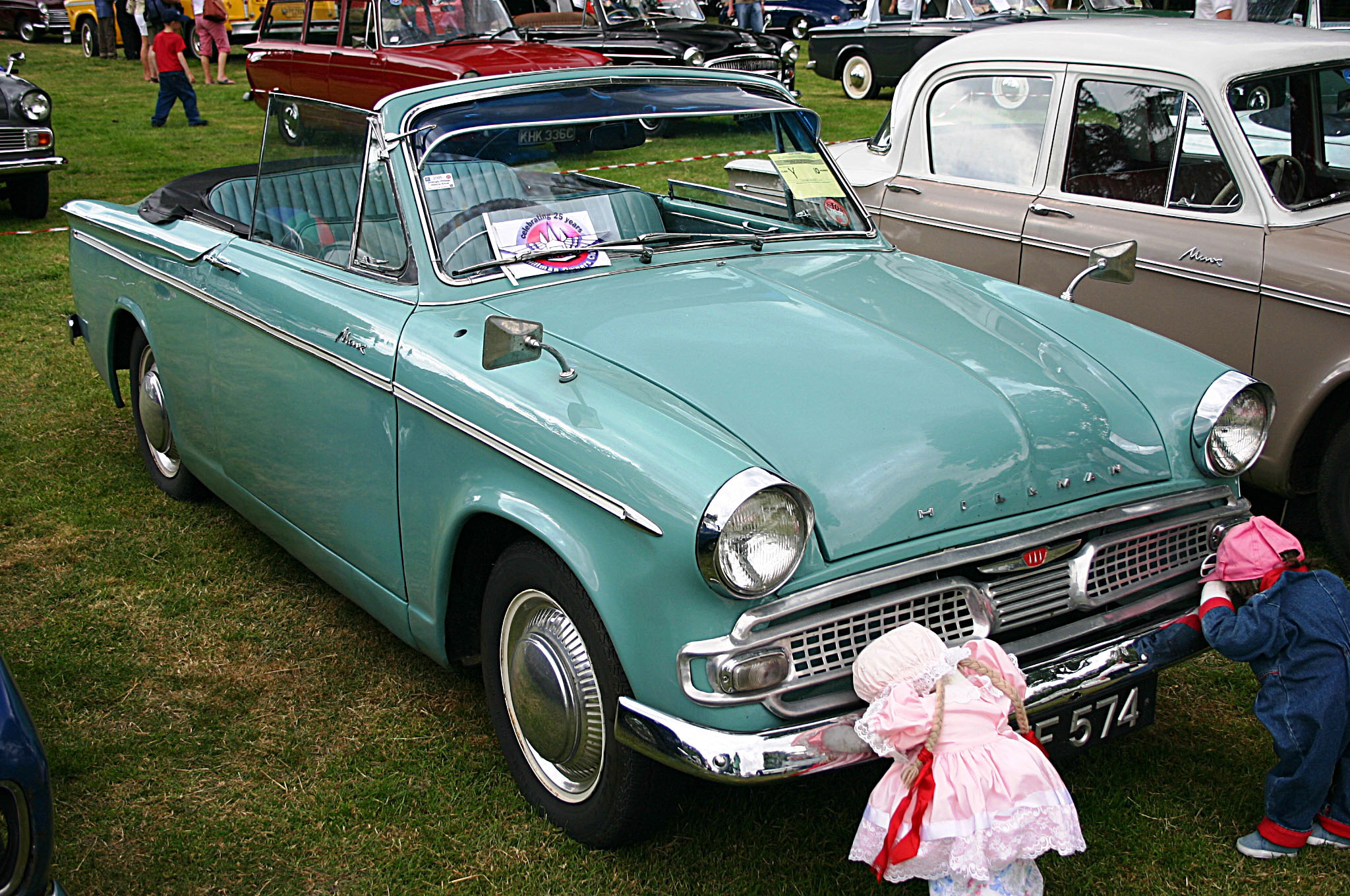
Hillman Minx Series IIIB Convertible featuring an alloy grille in place of the chrome grille of the Series IIIA

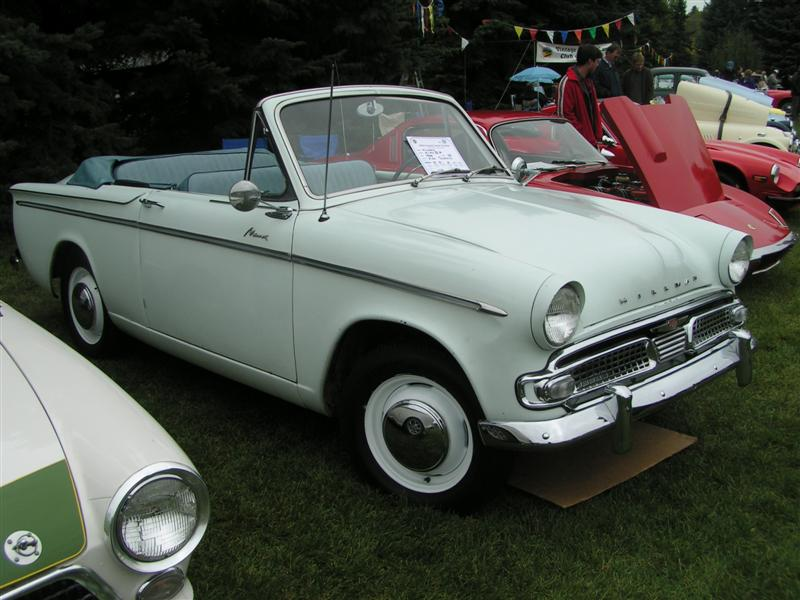
Hillman Minx Series IIIC Convertible: the last of the convertible Minx line

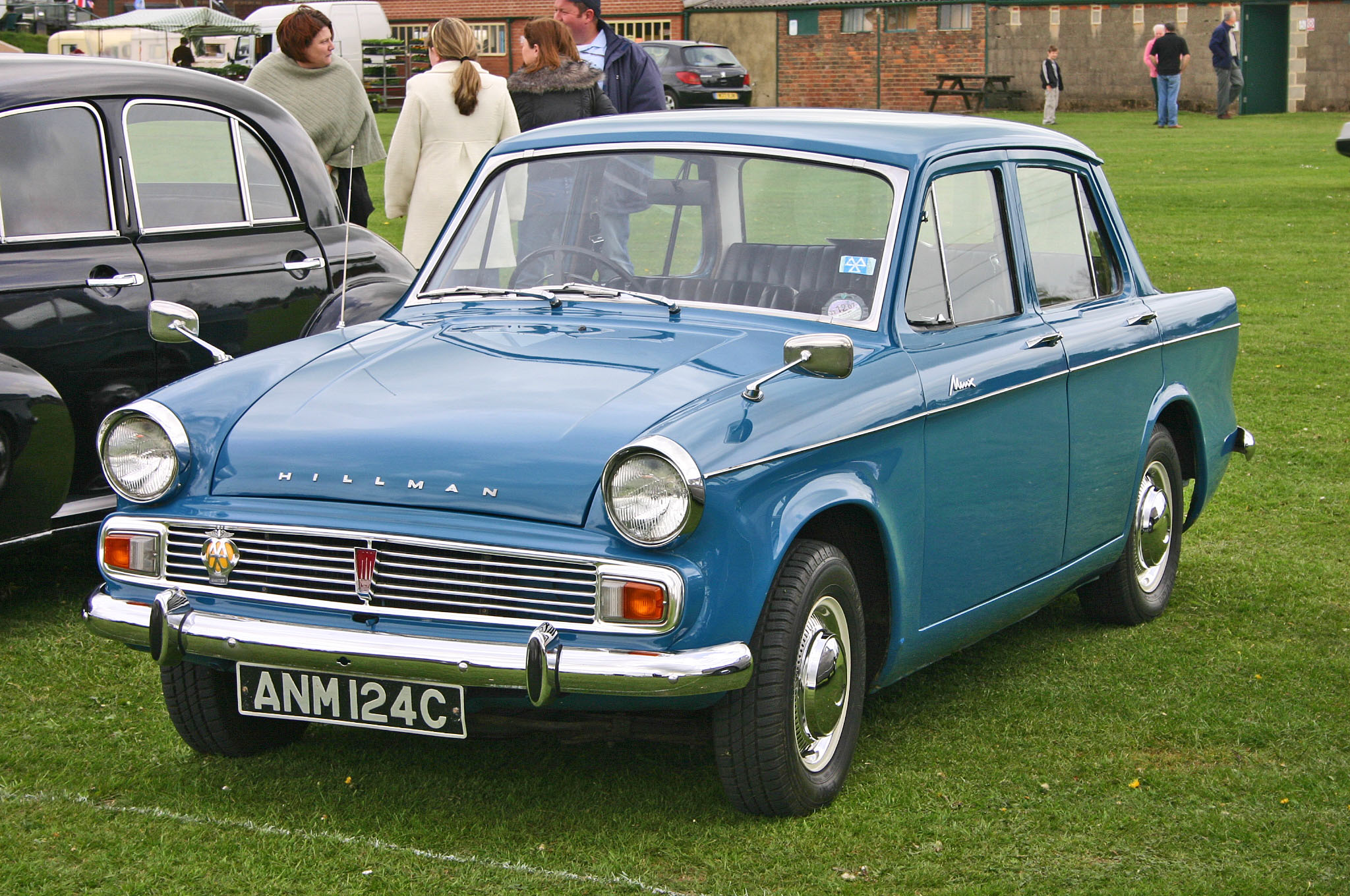
Hillman Minx Series V: Roof and rear window restyled, 13-inch wheels, disc brakes, 1592cc engine

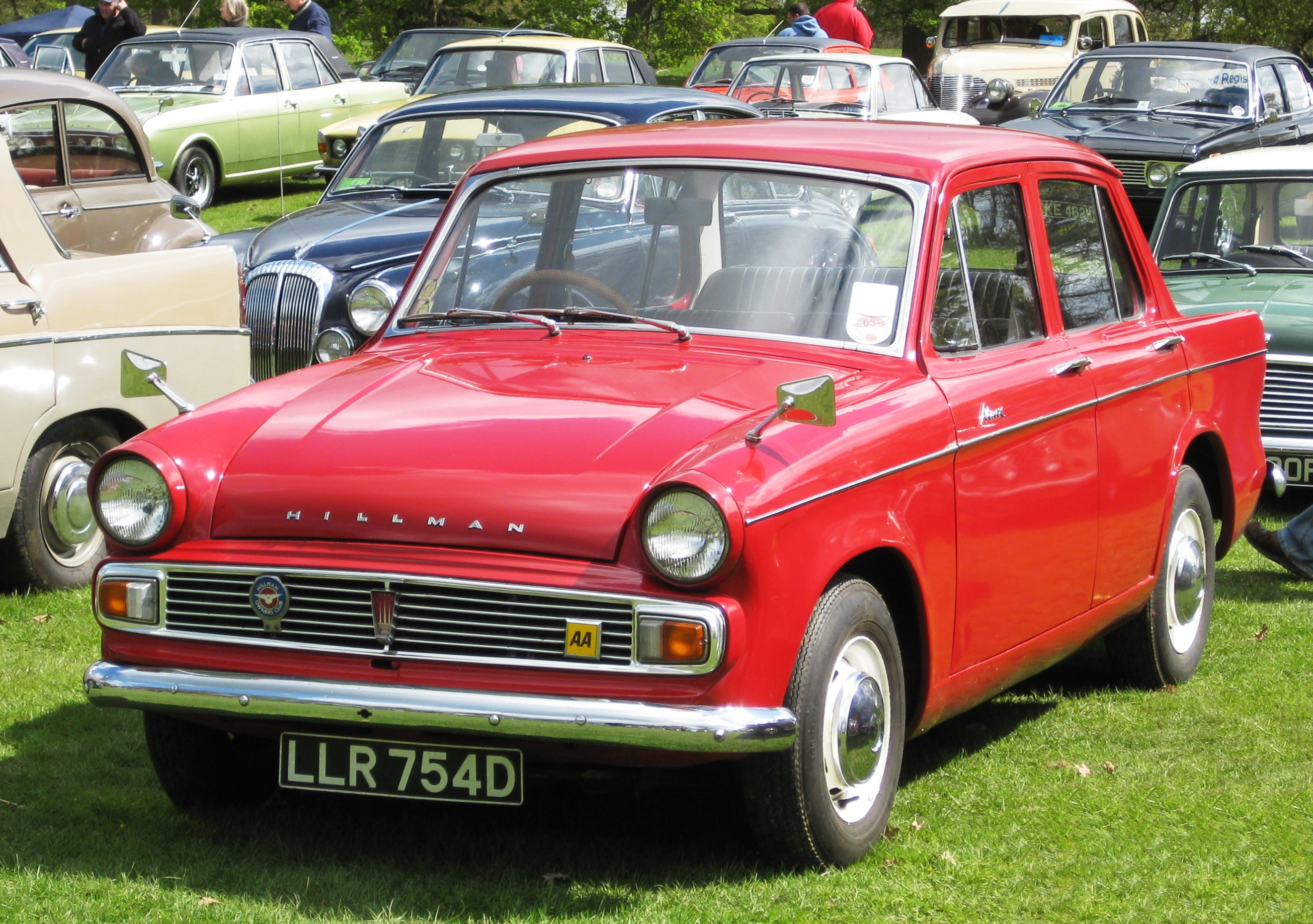
Hillman Minx Series VI: Bumper over-riders deleted, 1725cc engine

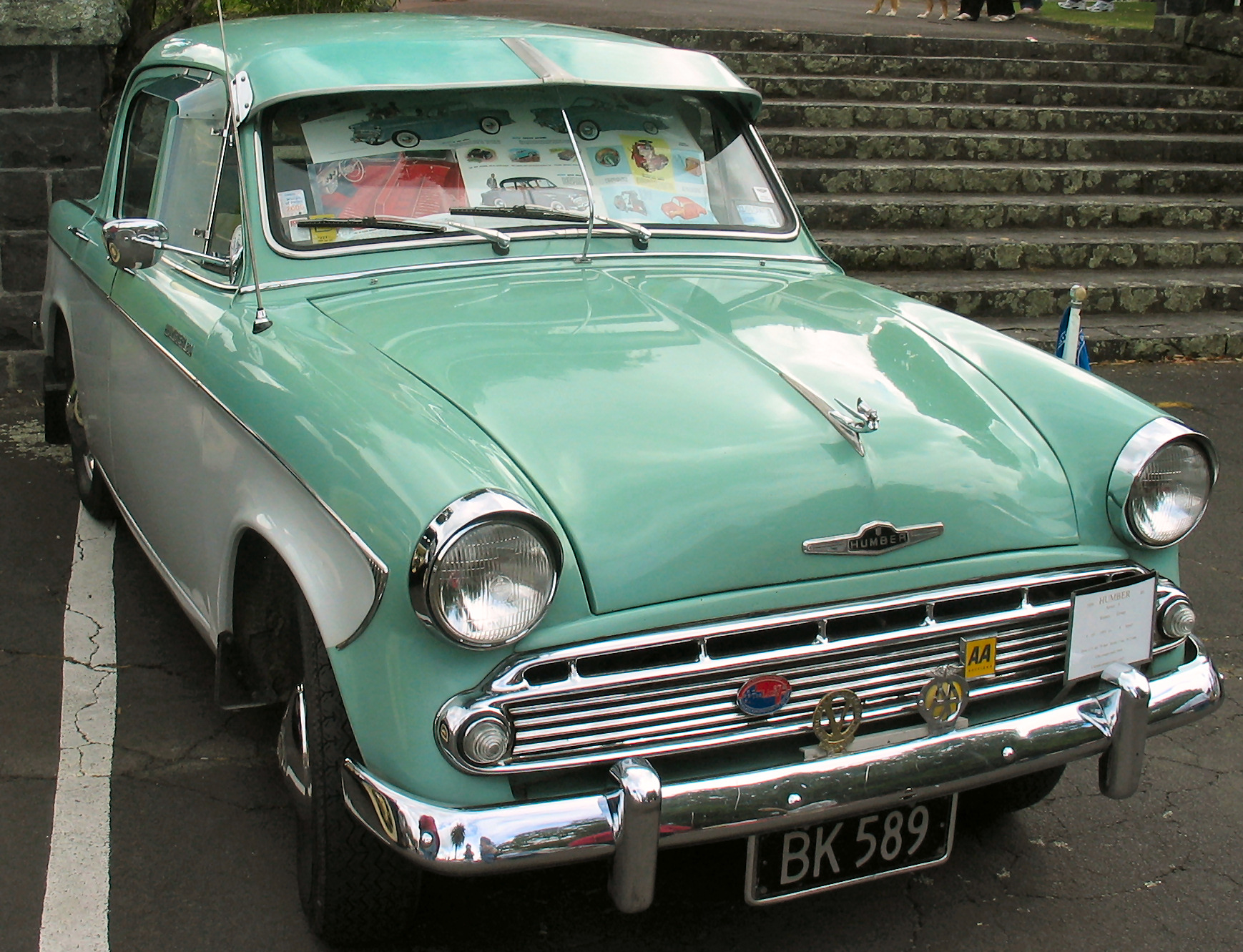
1959 Humber 80 – a Hillman Minx Series III badged as Humber for some markets such as (here) in New Zealand

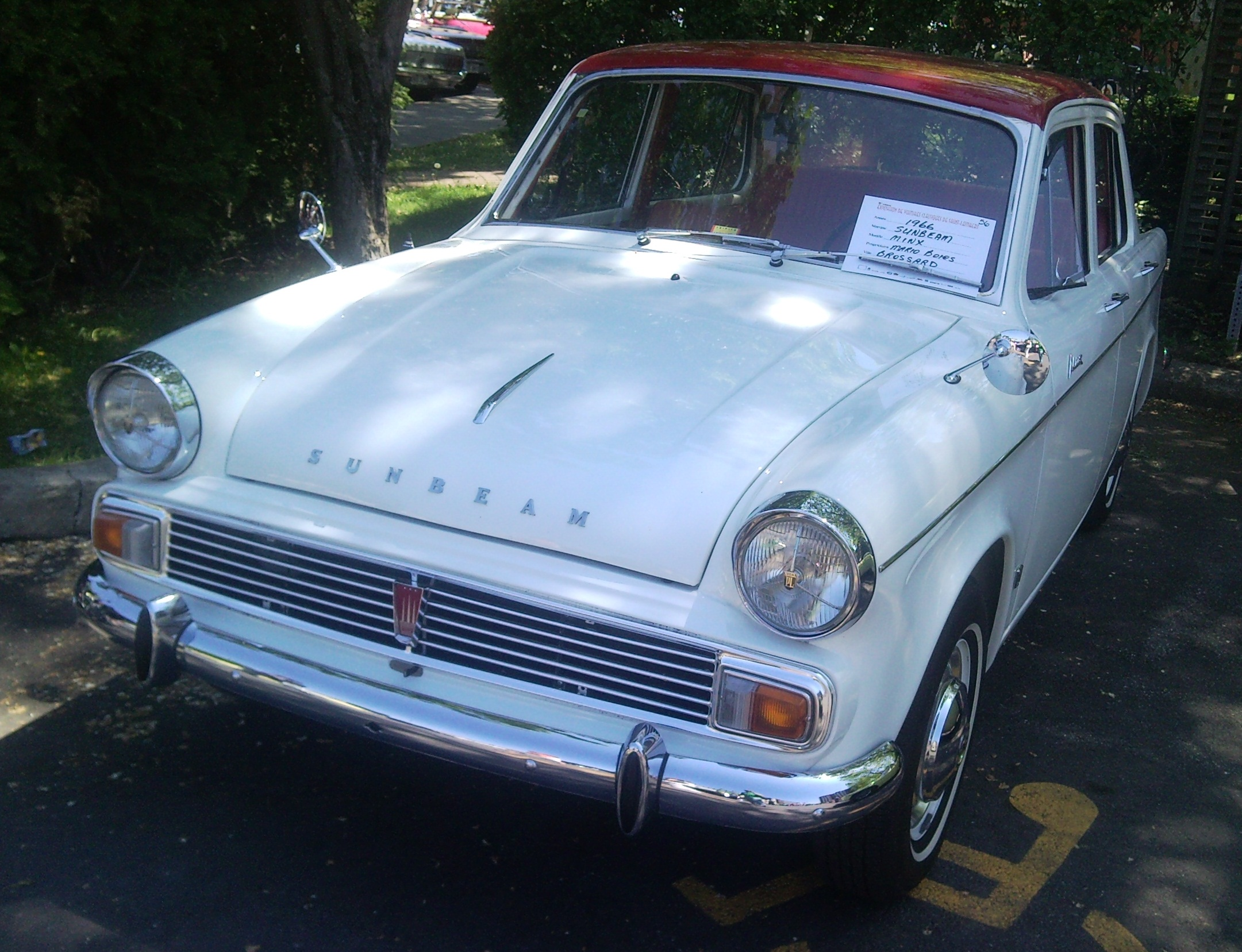
1966 Sunbeam Minx in Canada

== Super Minx (1961–1967) ==
Hillman Super Minx
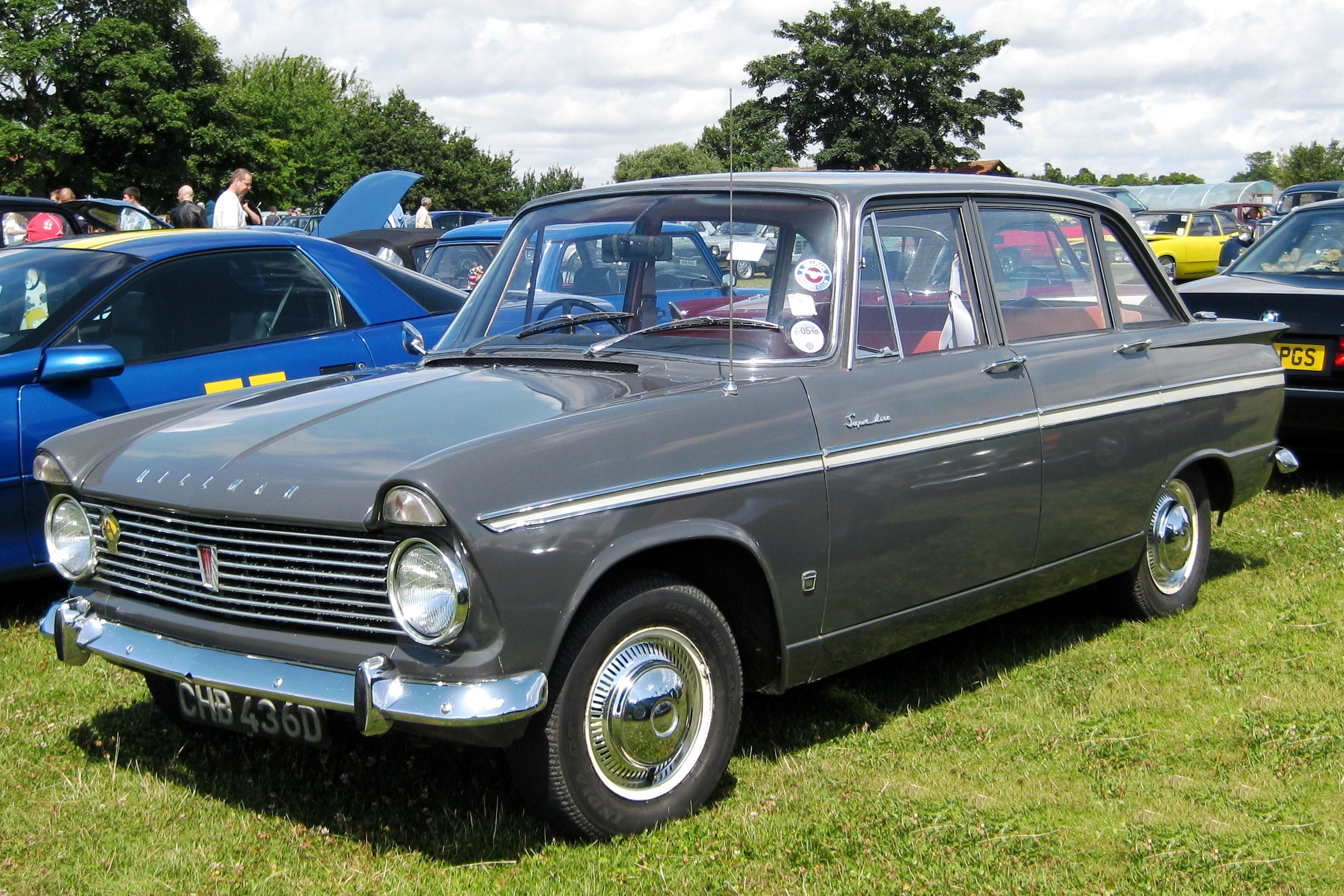
- Hillman Super Minx Mark IV Saloon

Launched late in 1961, the Hillman Super Minx was intended at one stage to replace the Minx Series III. In the event the Series III would be replaced in 1963 by the Series V, while the Super Minx was launched as a separate, albeit closely related, model.

== New Minx (1967–1970) ==
Hillman New Minx
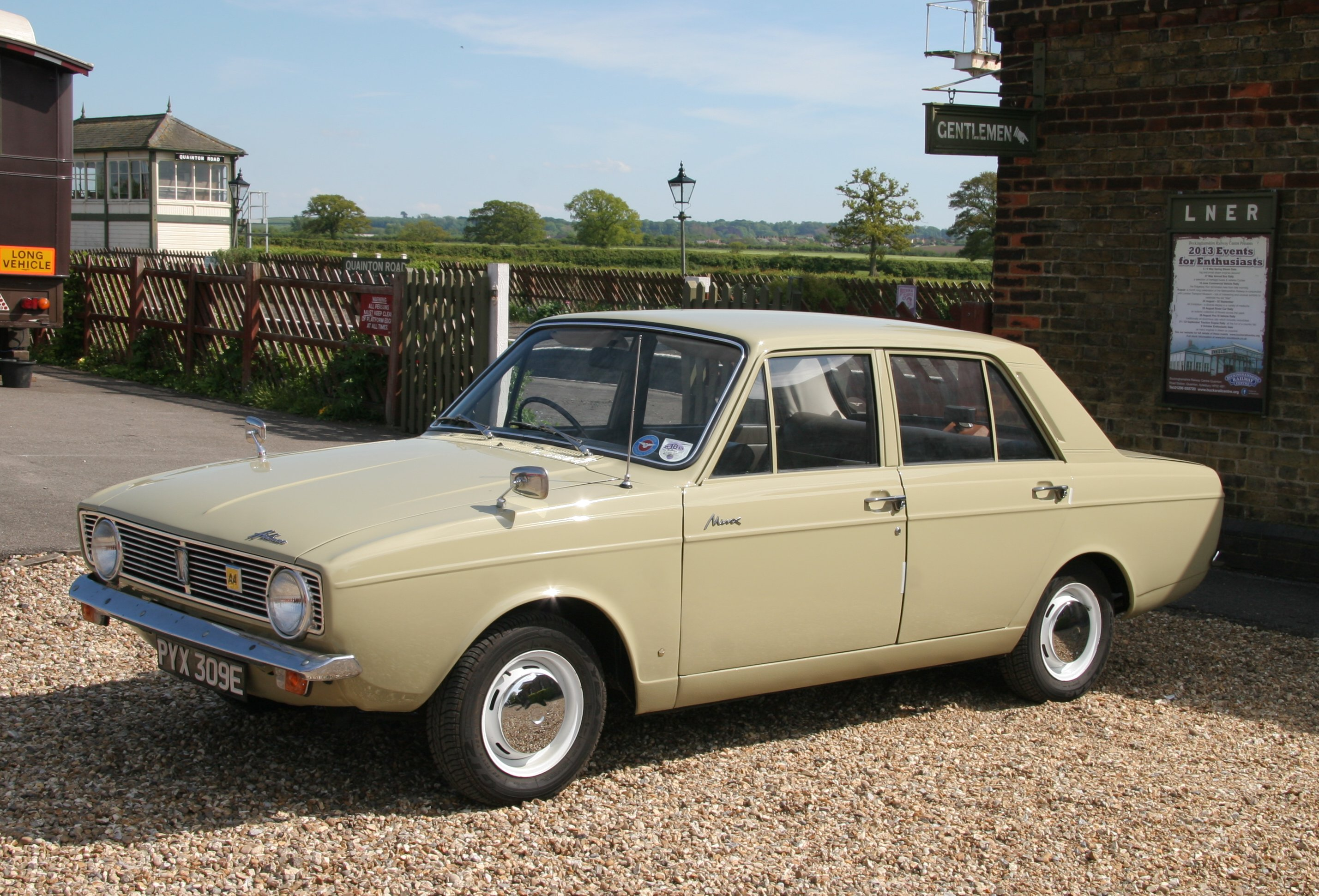
- Hillman New Minx saloon

Overview
- Also called: Sunbeam Minx
- Production: 1967–1970
- Assembly: United Kingdom

Body and chassis
- Body style: 4-door saloon 4-door estate
- Related: Hillman Hunter; Singer New Gazelle

Powertrain
- Engine: 1496 cc I4; 1725 cc I4

Chronology
- Predecessor: Hillman Minx Series VI
- Successor: Hillman Hunter

A replacement Minx (sometimes identified, retrospectively, as the New Minx) took over from the Series VI in 1967. It was a reduced specification version of the Hillman Hunter. Saloon and estate versions were produced, initially equipped with a 54 bhp 1496 cc 4 cylinder engine. A 61 bhp 1725cc engine became available in 1968. The final Minx was replaced by a Hillman Hunter De Luxe model in 1970.

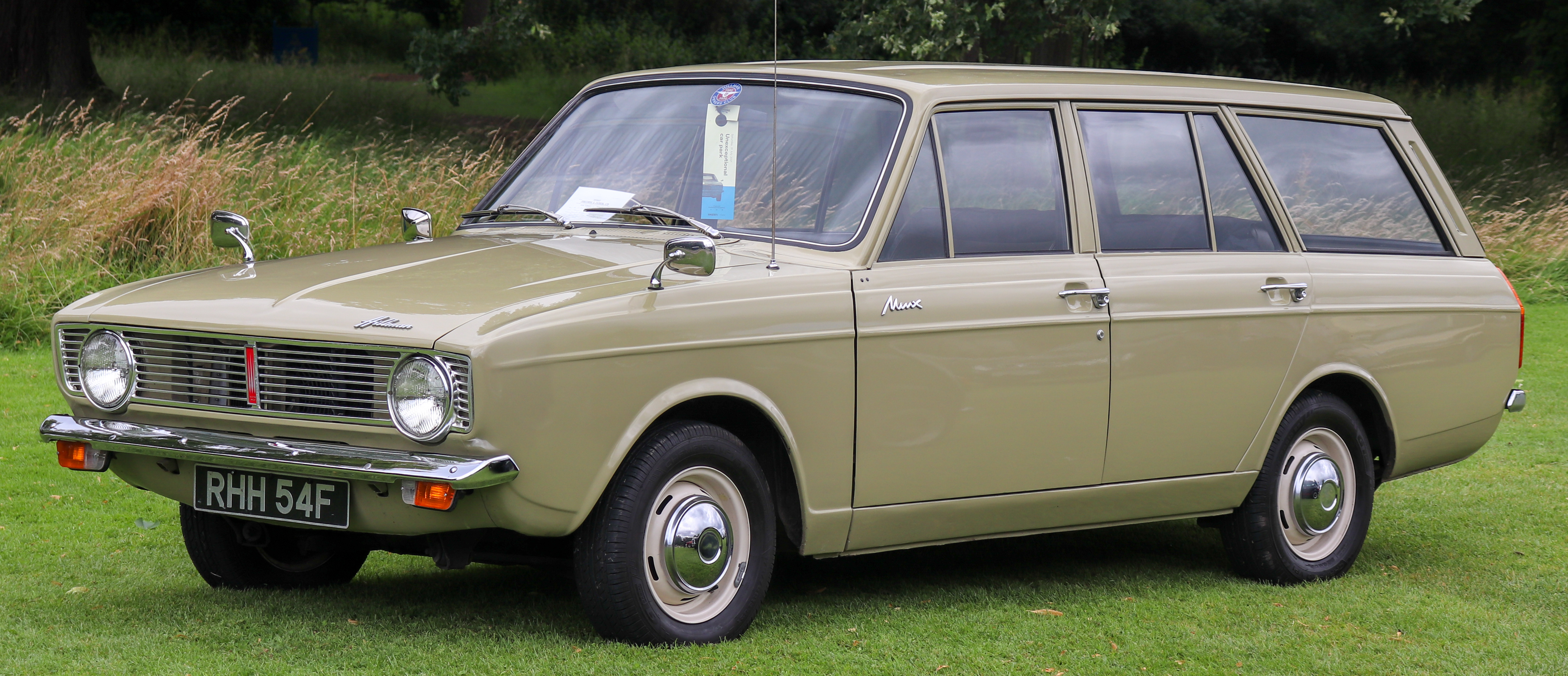
1968 Hillman Minx estate

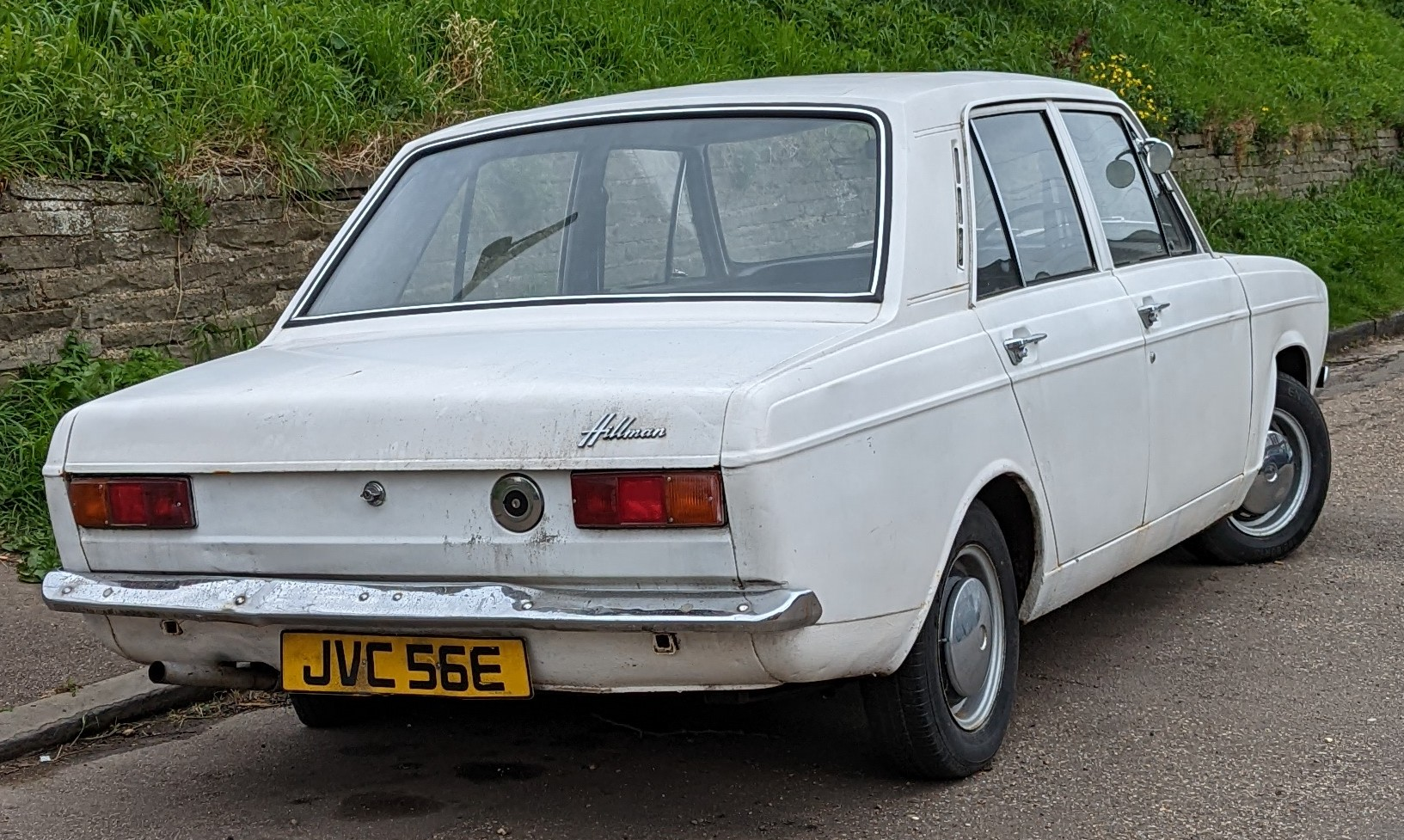
1967 Hillman Minx saloon rear

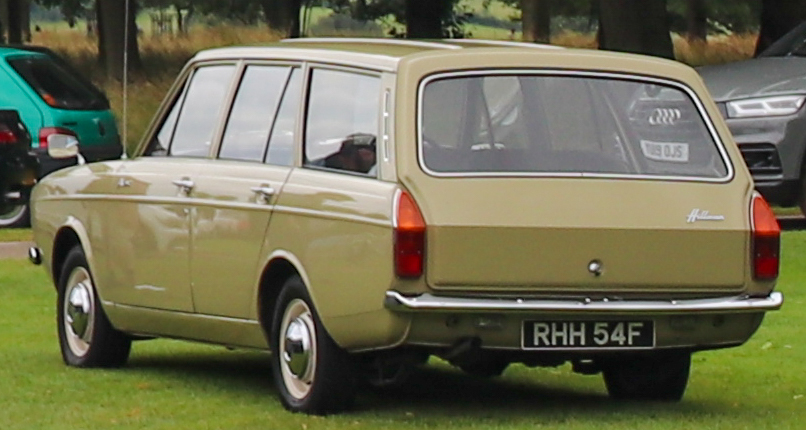
Estate rear

== Models ==
Type	Year	Engine	Approx. production	Body types	Wheelbase	Max speed	Notes
Minx	1932–33	1185 cc 4-cylinder side-valve	n/a	tourer, sports tourer, 4 light saloon, 6 light saloon, drophead coupé	92 in (2,337 mm)	62 mph (100 km/h)	3-speed gearbox, Bendix brakes, wire wheels
Minx	1934	1185 cc 4-cylinder side-valve	n/a	tourer, sports tourer, 4 light saloon, 6 light saloon, drophead coupé	92 in (2,337 mm)	62 mph (100 km/h)	4-speed gearbox
Minx	1935	1185 cc 4-cylinder side-valve	n/a	tourer, sports tourer, 4 light saloon, 6 light saloon, drophead coupé	92 in (2,337 mm)	62 mph (100 km/h)	Synchromesh gearbox
Minx Magnificent	1936–37	1185 cc 4-cylinder side-valve	n/a	tourer, sports tourer, saloon, drophead coupé, estate (1937)	93 in (2,362 mm)	62 mph (100 km/h)	New chassis with the engine moved forwards; pressed steel wheels
New Minx	1938–39	1185 cc 4-cylinder side-valve	n/a	saloon, drophead coupé, estate	93 in (2,362 mm)	62 mph (100 km/h)	Styling update
Minx	1940–44	1185 cc 4-cylinder side-valve	n/a	saloon, drophead coupé	93 in (2,362 mm)	62 mph (100 km/h)	Unitary construction, 12-volt, rear-hinged bonnet, probably no coupés made
Car, Light Utility, Hillman 10HP	1940–45	4 cyl. 30 bhp (22 kW) engine 1185 cc sv		Utility body (also Saloon, "Convertible Van" "Ladder Van")	151 in (3,835 mm)		Six Marks, pickup bodies with integral cab
Minx Mark I	1945–47	1185 cc 4-cylinder side-valve	60,000 (estimated including Mark II)	saloon, drophead coupé, estate	93 in (2,362 mm)	63 mph (101 km/h)	Unitary construction, 12-volt, rear-hinged bonnet
Minx Mark II	1947–48	1185 cc 4-cylinder side-valve	see Mark I	saloon, drophead coupé, estate	93 in (2,362 mm)	66 mph (106 km/h)	Styling update: faired in headlamps, hydraulic brakes
Minx Mark III	1948–49	1185 cc 4-cylinder side-valve	28,619	saloon, convertible, estate	93 in (2,362 mm)	70 mph (110 km/h)	New styling, independent front suspension
Minx Mark IV	1949–51	1265 cc 4-cylinder side-valve	90,832	saloon, convertible, estate, pickup/utility	93 in (2,362 mm)	68 mph (109 km/h)	Styling as Mark III
Minx Mark V	1951–53	1265 cc 4-cylinder side-valve	59,777	saloon, convertible, estate	93 in (2,362 mm)	73 mph (117 km/h)	Minor changes
Minx Mark VI	1953	1265 cc 4-cylinder side-valve	44,643	saloon, convertible, 'California' coupé, estate	93 in (2,362 mm)	70 mph (110 km/h)	New grille
Minx Mark VII	1953–54	1265 cc 4-cylinder side-valve	60,711	saloon, convertible, coupé, estate	93 in (2,362 mm)	69 mph (111 km/h)	Bigger boot
Minx Mark VIII	1954–57	1390 cc 4-cylinder overhead-valve	94,123	saloon, convertible, coupé, estate, pickup/coupé utility	93 in (2,362 mm)	74 mph (119 km/h)	15-inch wheels; early examples have previous engine
Minx Series I	1956–57	1390 cc 4-cylinder overhead-valve	202,204	saloon, convertible, estate	96 in (2,438 mm)	78 mph (126 km/h)	New body designed by Raymond Loewy, reminiscent of his 1955 Studebaker
Minx Series II	1957–58	1390 cc 4-cylinder overhead-valve	202,204	saloon, convertible, estate	96 in (2,438 mm)	78 mph (126 km/h)	Minor styling change
Minx Series III	1958–59	1494 cc 4-cylinder overhead-valve	83,105	saloon, convertible, estate	96 in (2,438 mm)	77 mph (124 km/h)	New grille
Minx Series IIIA, B	1959–60, 60–61	1494 cc 4-cylinder overhead-valve	78,052 and 58,260	saloon, convertible, estate	96 in (2,438 mm)	80 mph (130 km/h)	Tail fins; optional auto; hypoid rear axle on IIIB
Minx Series IIIC	1961–63	1592 cc 4-cylinder overhead-valve	n/a	saloon, convertible, estate	96 in (2,438 mm)	78 mph (126 km/h)	No convertibles after mid 1962
Super Minx Series I	1961–62	1592 cc 4-cylinder overhead-valve	n/a	saloon, convertible, estate	101 in (2,565 mm)	82 mph (132 km/h)	Long wheelbase Minx
Minx Series V	1963–65	1592 cc 4-cylinder overhead-valve	n/a	saloon	96 in (2,438 mm)	77 mph (124 km/h)	Front discs
Super Minx Series II	1962–63	1592 cc 4-cylinder overhead-valve	n/a	saloon, convertible, estate	101 in (2,565 mm)	82 mph (132 km/h)	Front discs
Super Minx Series III	1964–65	1592 cc 4-cylinder overhead-valve	n/a	saloon	101 in (2,565 mm)	81 mph (130 km/h)	All synchromesh gearbox revised "C" post
Minx Series VI	1965–67	1725 cc 4-cylinder overhead-valve	n/a	saloon	96 in (2,438 mm)	82 mph (132 km/h)	All synchromesh gearbox
Super Minx Series IV	1964–65	1725 cc 4-cylinder overhead-valve	n/a	saloon	101 in (2,565 mm)	82 mph (132 km/h)	
Hunter	1966–79	1725 cc 4-cylinder overhead-valve	470,000	saloon, estate	98 in (2,489 mm)	90 mph (140 km/h)	"Arrow" series shape, optional overdrive
New Minx	1967–70	1496 cc 4-cylinder overhead-valve	470,000	saloon, estate	98 in (2,489 mm)	83 mph (134 km/h)	Basic "Arrow" Hunter; 1725 cc engine optional on estates

== Scale Models ==
- Meccano Dinky Toys; No. 154 (production 1954–58), Minx Mark I to VIII (1945–57) approximately O scale (1:44).
- Meccano Dinky Toys; No. 175 (production 1958–61), Hillman Minx Series I approximately O scale (1:44).
- Triang Spot-On Hillman Minx Series V 1:42 scale
