= Hillman Super Minx =

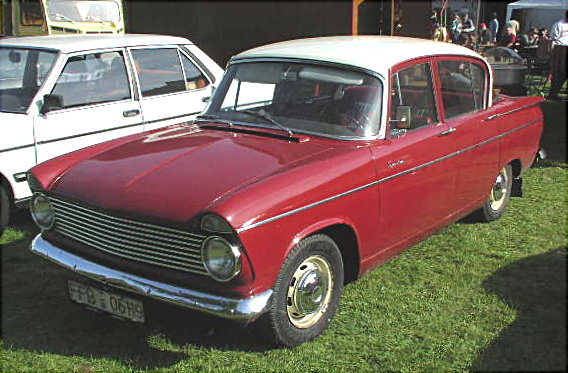
- Hillman Super Minx Mk I

Overview
- Manufacturer: Hillman (Rootes Group)
- Also called: Humber 90 (New Zealand, South Africa)
- Production: 1961–1966 (saloon); 1962–1964 (convertible); 1962–1967 (estate)
- Assembly: United Kingdom; Port Melbourne, Australia; Petone, New Zealand

Body and chassis
- Body style: 4-door saloon 5-door estate 2-door Convertible
- Related: Singer Vogue; Humber Vogue (Australia); Humber Sceptre; Hillman Minx

Powertrain
- Engine: 1,592 cc (97.1 cu in) I4 (1961–1965); 1,725 cc (105.3 cu in) I4 (1965–1967)

Dimensions
- Wheelbase: 101 in (2,565 mm)
- Length: 165 in (4,191 mm))
- Width: 62.8 in (1,595 mm)
- Height: 58 in (1,473 mm)
- Curb weight: 2,239 lb (1,016 kg) (saloon); 2,368 lb (1,074 kg) (estate)

Chronology
- Successor: Rootes Arrow

The Hillman Super Minx is a family car which was produced by Hillman from 1961 to 1967. It was a slightly larger version of the Hillman Minx, from the period when the long-running Minx nameplate was applied to the "Audax" series of designs. (The Minx underwent many changes throughout its history, and the Super Minx name was not used during production of non-Audax Minx designs.)

== Mark I ==
Announced in October 1961, the Super Minx gave Rootes, and particularly its Hillman marque, an expanded presence in the upper reaches of the family car market. It has been suggested that the Super Minx design was originally intended to replace, and not merely to supplement, the standard Minx, but was found to be too big for that purpose. An estate car joined the range in May 1962, and a two-door convertible in June 1962. The convertible never sold in significant numbers: the last one was made in June 1964, ahead of the introduction, in September 1964, of the Super Minx Mark III.

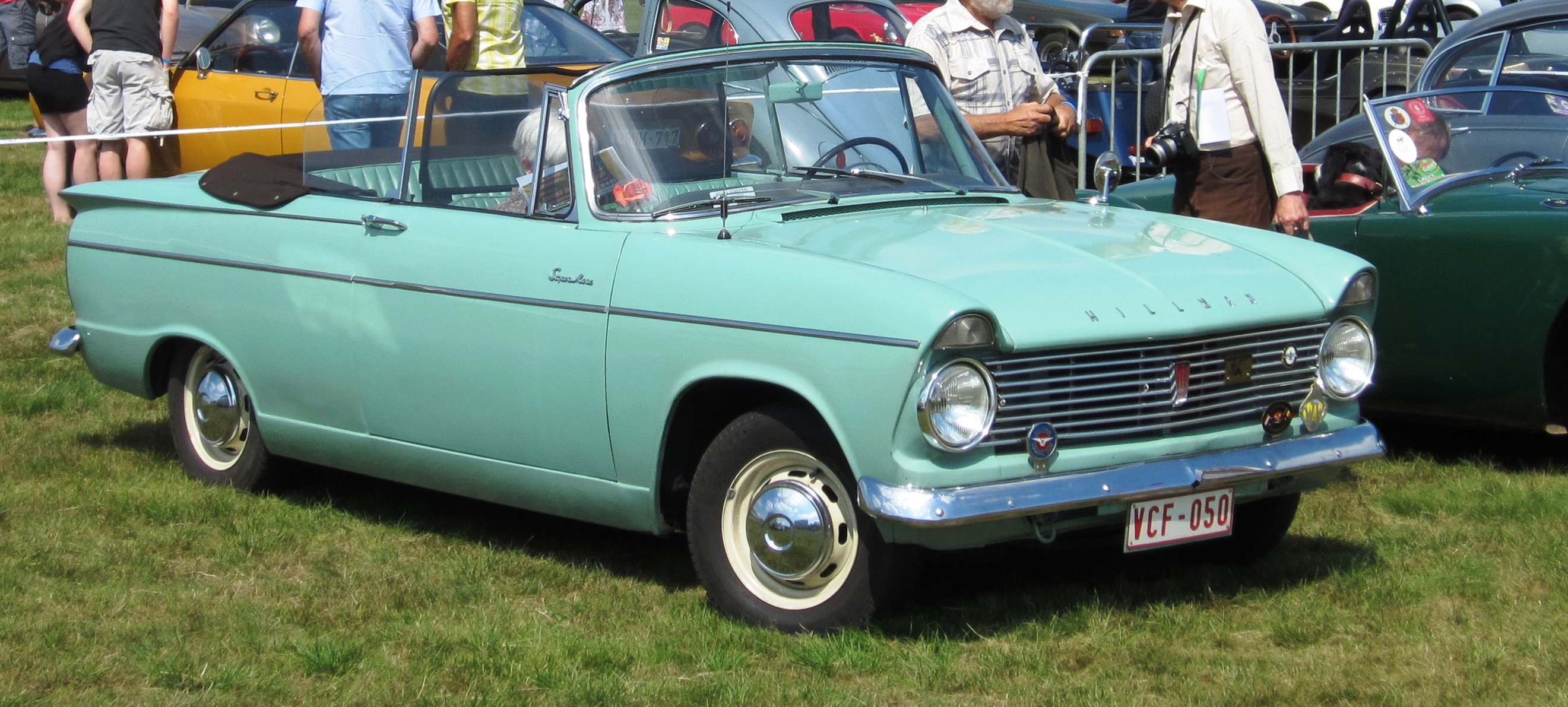
A convertible version was offered until 1964.

The car was powered by the Rootes 1,592 cc (97.1 cu in) unit, which had first appeared late in 1953 with a 1,390 cc (85 cu in) capacity. The original Super Minx had the cast-iron cylinder head version of the engine, though on later cars the cylinder head was replaced with an aluminium one.

Suspension was independent at the front using coil springs with anti-roll bar and at the rear had leaf springs and a live axle. Un-assisted 9 in (229 mm) Lockheed drum brakes were fitted. The steering used a recirculating ball system and was as usual at the time not power assisted. Standard seating, trimmed in Vynide, used a bench type at the front with individual seats as an option. A heater was fitted but a radio remained optional. The car could be ordered in single colour or two tone paint. The four-speed manual transmission featured synchromesh on the top three ratios from the start and had a floor lever: "Smiths Easidrive" automatic transmission was option.

A car was tested by the British magazine The Motor in 1962 and had a top speed of 80.0 mph (128.7 km/h) and could accelerate from 0-60 mph (97 km/h) in 21.6 seconds. A "touring" fuel consumption of 27.9 miles per imperial gallon (10.1 L/100 km; 23.2 mpg_{‑US}) was recorded. The test car cost £854 including taxes, which was then slightly less than the recently upgraded Austin Cambridge A60.

The first Super Minxes featured the 1,592 cc (97.1 cu in) engine as used in the Hillman Minx, providing in this application a claimed 62 bhp (46 kW; 63 PS) of power.

== Mark II ==
A year after the car was launched a Mark II version was presented, in October 1962, with greasing points eliminated, larger front disc brakes and a revised axle ratio. For buyers of the automatic transmission cars, 1962 was the year that the Smiths Easidrive option was replaced by the Borg-Warner 35 transmission.

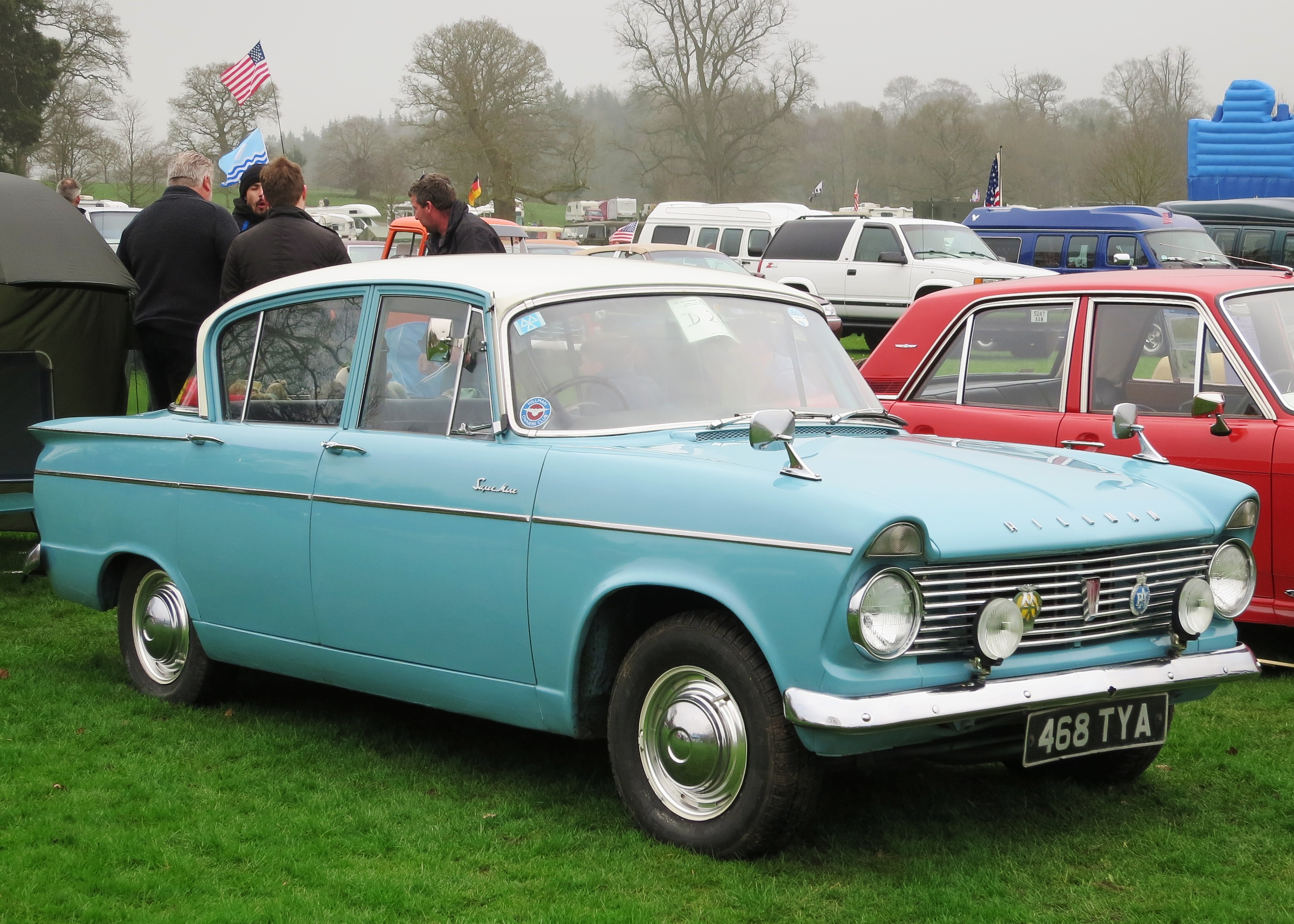
Hillman Super Minx Mark II Saloon

== Mark III ==
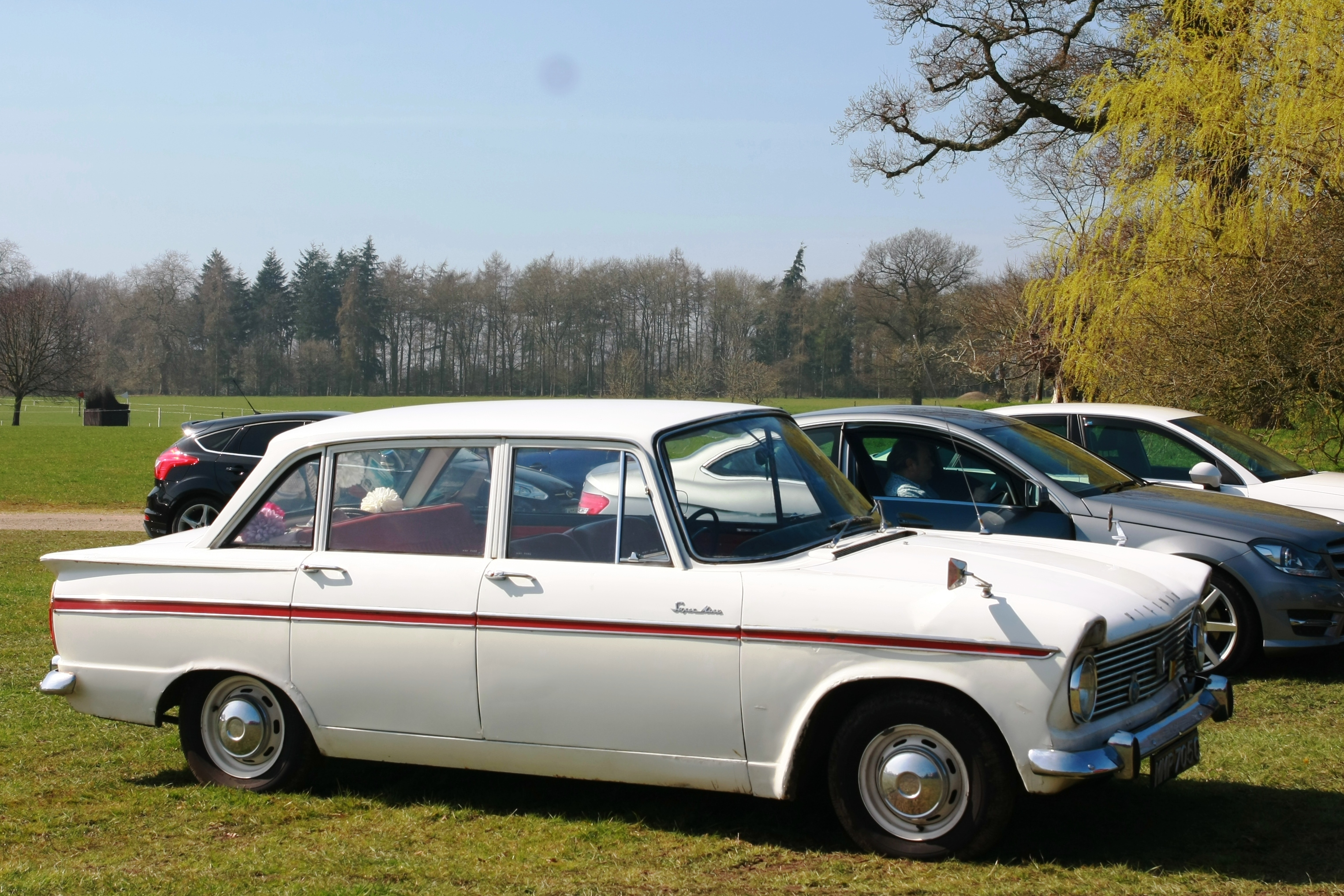
The "wraparound" rear window was replaced by a simpler arrangement in 1964.

In 1964, with the launch of the Super Minx Mark III the Super Minx was facelifted, and the wrap-around rear window gave way to a new "six-light" design with a larger side windows aft of the rear side doors. The windscreen and side windows were also made taller and the roof-line flatter.

== Mark IV ==
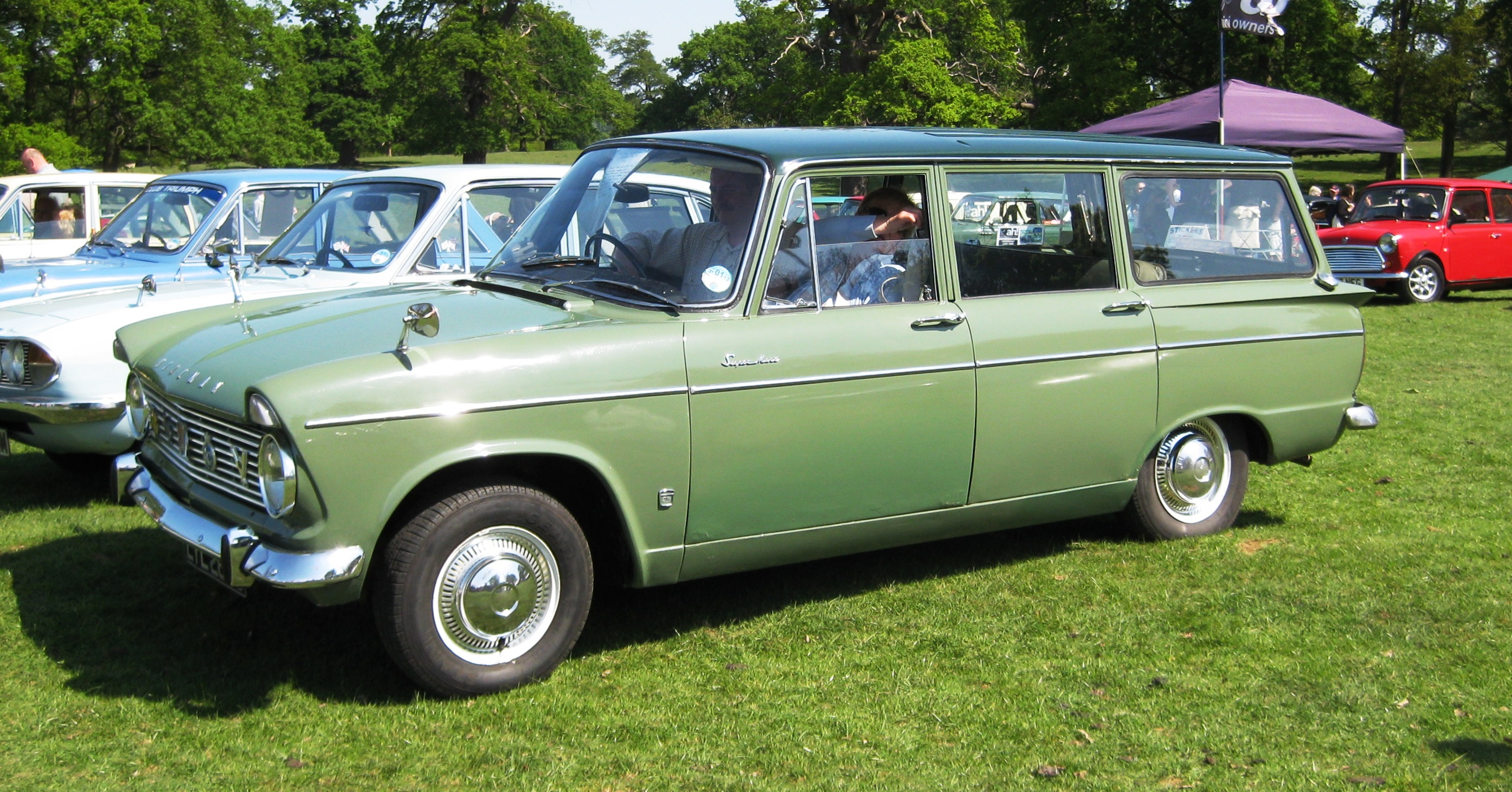
The Super Minx was also available as an estate car.

Engine capacity was increased to 1,725 cc (105.3 cu in) for the Super Minx Mark IV launched at the London Motor Show in October 1965. (The larger engine outlived the Super Minx, to be used in later models too.)

== Related models ==
Like many other Rootes products including the Minx, the Super Minx was one of a badge-engineered series of models, sold under various marques.

The Singer marque was represented by the Singer Vogue which had been announced in July 1961, four months earlier than the Hillman Super Minx. The range was joined in 1963 by a Humber: the Humber Sceptre. The Singer Vogue and Humber Sceptre names would be retained by the successor Rootes Arrow model range. The Sceptre was developed as a four-door replacement for the Sunbeam Rapier, but was re-designated as a Humber shortly before launch, while the two-door Rapier based on the 'Audax' Minx continued unreplaced until 1967. The Sceptre nevertheless was able to be successfully promoted as a more sporty car than the larger traditional Humbers. Unlike the Hillman and Singer versions, the Super Minx-based Humber Sceptre retained the same roof, with large panoramic windscreen and shallow wrap-around rear window with fins, until the model was replaced, in the Humber's case in 1967, by a Hillman Hunter-based successor.

The cars differed in subtle ways, with the Singer being positioned slightly above the Hillman and gaining such extras as quad headlights, and the Humber topping the range, commensurate with Humber's traditional role as a producer of upmarket and luxury models. The styling of the Sceptre (as well as the Vogue) somewhat recalled previous, larger Humbers. The Sceptre marks 1 and 1A had a slightly different grille arrangement and front trim to the Vogue as well as a taller panoramic windscreen, sloping rear roofline and larger rear fins. It had been intended that the Sceptre be a sports saloon until shortly before its launch as a Humber, hence its sprightly performance compared with other Humber models.

Nearly five years after its launch, a Singer Vogue Series IV saloon tested by the Britain's Autocar magazine in August 1966, now with an advertised power output of 85 bhp (63 kW; 86 PS), had a top speed of 93 mph (150 km/h) and could accelerate from 0-60 mph (97 km/h) in 25 seconds. An overall fuel consumption of 22.0 miles per imperial gallon (12.8 L/100 km; 18.3 mpg_{‑US}) was achieved. The test car was priced by Rootes in the UK at £911 including taxes, at a time when the Austin 1800 was retailing for £888 and the Ford Corsair GT was offered at £925. The performance was felt to be lively, and the gear change, supported on the test car with an optional overdrive, ‘crisp’ with well chosen ratios. Comfort and fittings were also commended, but the fuel consumption and the tendency of the heavy brakes to fade when used hard disappointed the testers: this would presumably not have been an issue had the road test been of a Humber Sceptre which had its stopping power from a servo-assisted 10-inch (250 mm) front disc/rear drum arrangement.

The Humber was also, at launch, fitted with a high tune version of the 1,592 cc and, from September 1965, 1,725 cc oversquare engine producing 80 hp (60 kW) and 85 hp (63 kW) respectively. Early models with the 1,592 cc engine had twin single Zenith downdraught carburettors - later 1,592/1,725 cc engines used a Solex twin choke downdraught carburettor for simplicity. The twin Zenith carburettors had been hard to keep balanced. Other modifications included a water-jacketed inlet manifold, timing adjustments and stronger valve springs to eliminate valve bounce at high engine speeds. The later H120's 107 hp (80 kW) engine is a straight swap for both of these units and looks almost identical - it provides a useful boost in power to an already swift automobile. The unique Sceptre interior featured full instrumentation, including a tachometer marked up to 6,000 rpm, and a four-speed floor-mounted transmission with self-cancelling overdrive (with column-mounted control and indicator) on third and fourth gear for a total of six separate ratios in standard form. The lockout could be removed on first and second gears, and this was often done by Rootes in cars used for competitions such as rallying. In addition, the Sceptre was from the beginning provided with servo-assisted braking control and, unusually in 1963, 10-inch front disc-brakes. The Marks 1 and 1A were not available with an automatic option - although this was rectified with the Mark II cars, using a three-speed unit with automatic kick-down. This was a cheaper option than was usual at the time due to the deletion of the Laycock De Normanville overdrive fitted to the Manual cars.

There was a Singer variant of the smaller Minx as well (the Singer Gazelle) but no equivalent Humber version of the Minx, (except for the Humber 80 version of the Minx released in New Zealand, as is Humber 90 to the Super Minx in order to circumvent the government's maximum import number restrictions) which would have been uncharacteristically small for the Humber marque; conversely there was a sporty Sunbeam version of the Minx (the Sunbeam Rapier) but no Sunbeam version of the Super Minx.

In addition to assembling the Super Minx, Rootes Australia produced variants of the Singer Vogue from 1963 to 1966 as the Humber Vogue and Humber Vogue Sports.

At least six Humber Sceptre development mules were built with the same engine as the Sunbeam Tiger, a 289 cui Ford V8 unit. These never entered production, but at least one of the original cars survives.

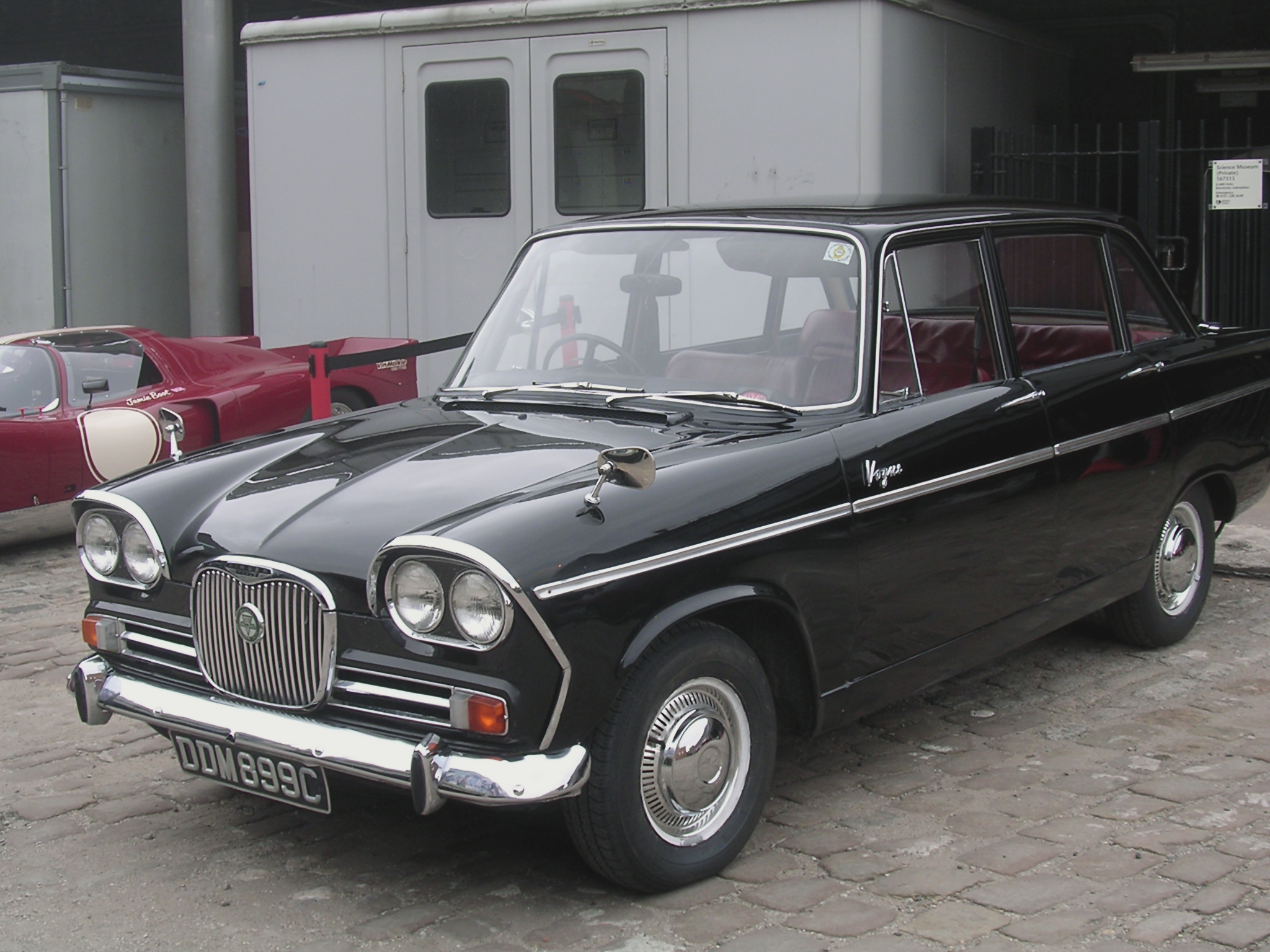
Singer Vogue after the 1964 facelift which saw the wrap around rear window replaced with a more modern "six-light" arrangement

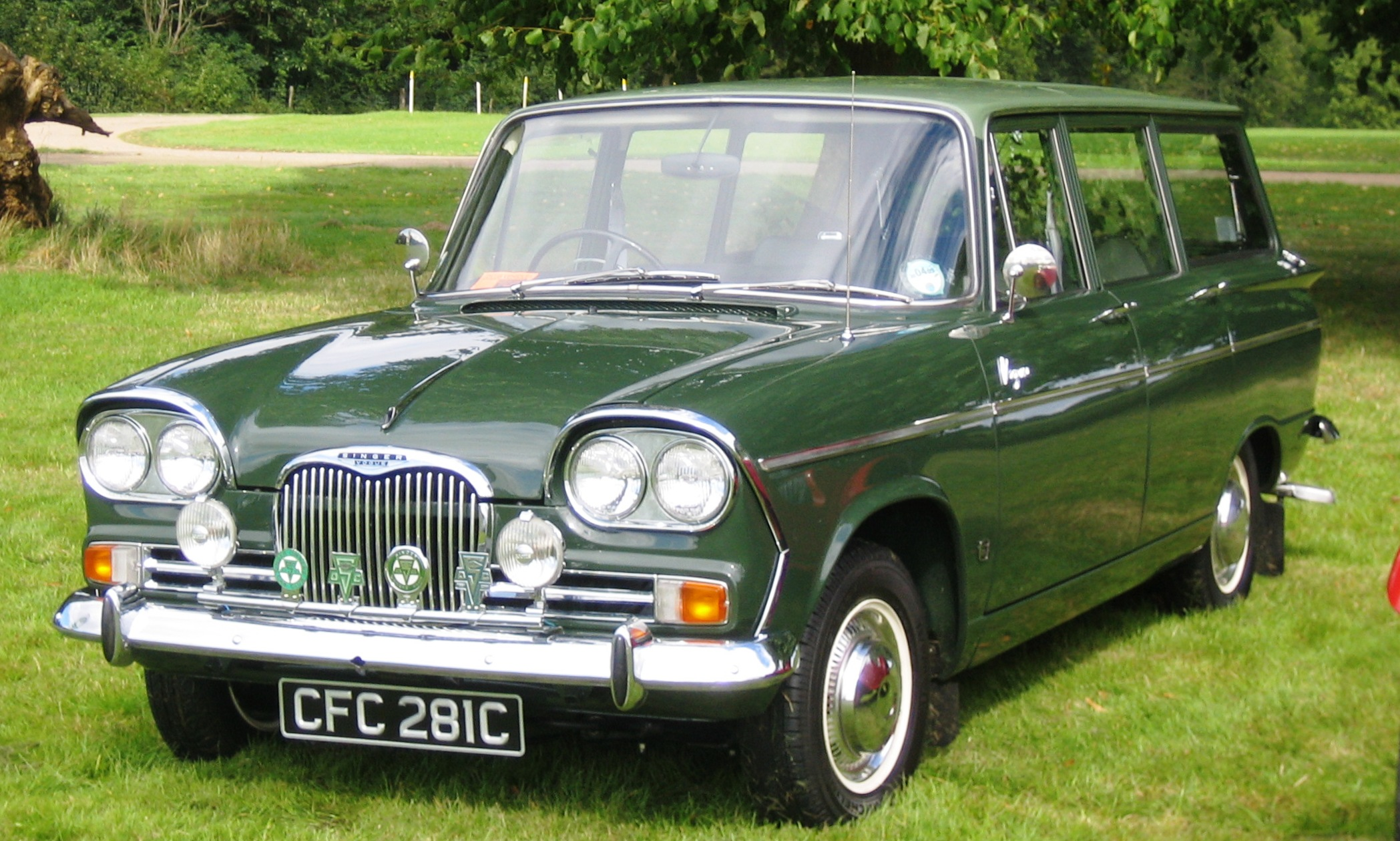
The Singer Vogue version was also available as an estate car.

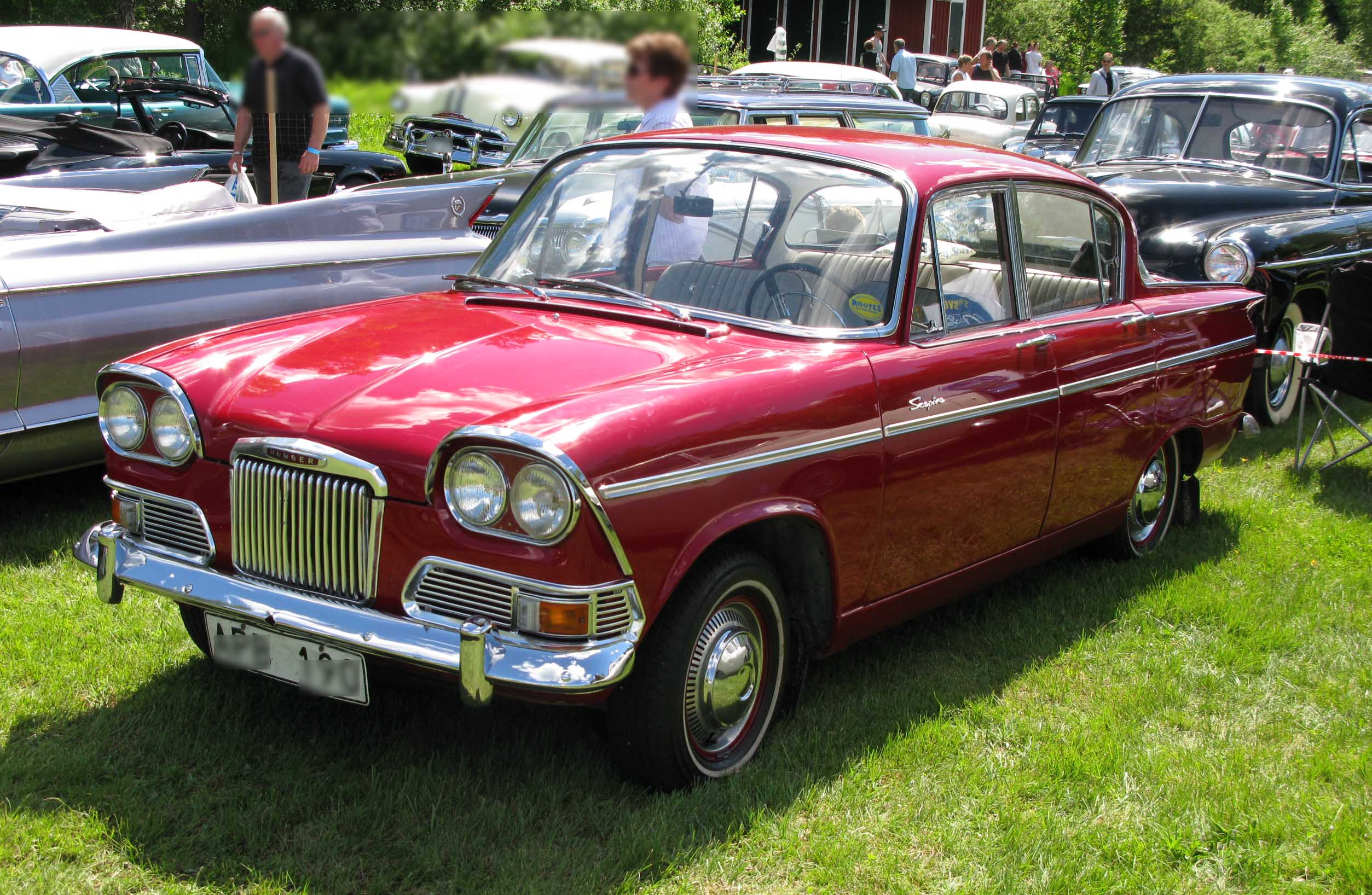
1964 Humber Sceptre. Unlike the Hillman and Singer versions, the Sceptre retained the panoramic wrap-around rear window throughout its life

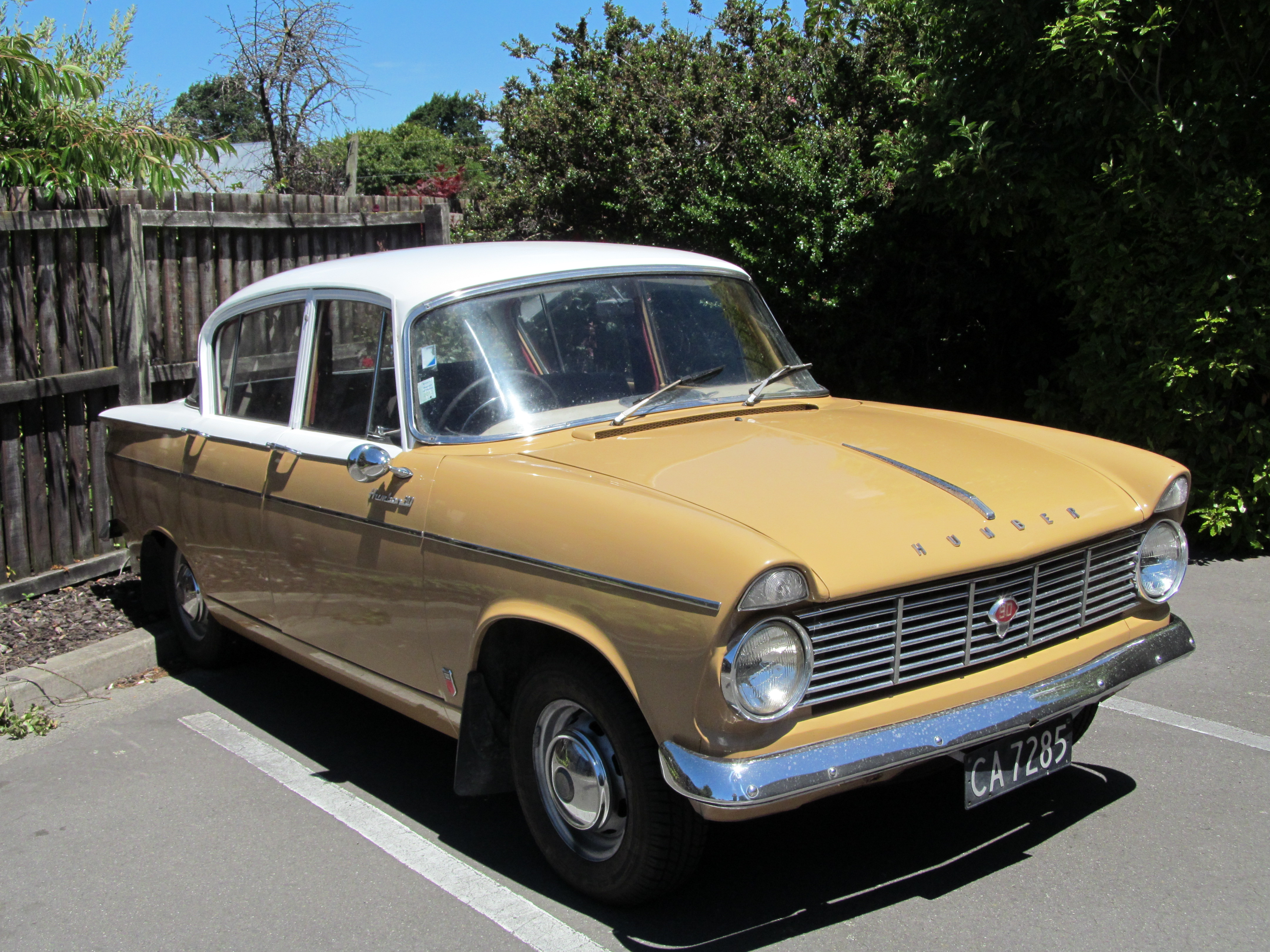
1964 Humber 90 Saloon, a badge engineered Hillman Super Minx Mark II

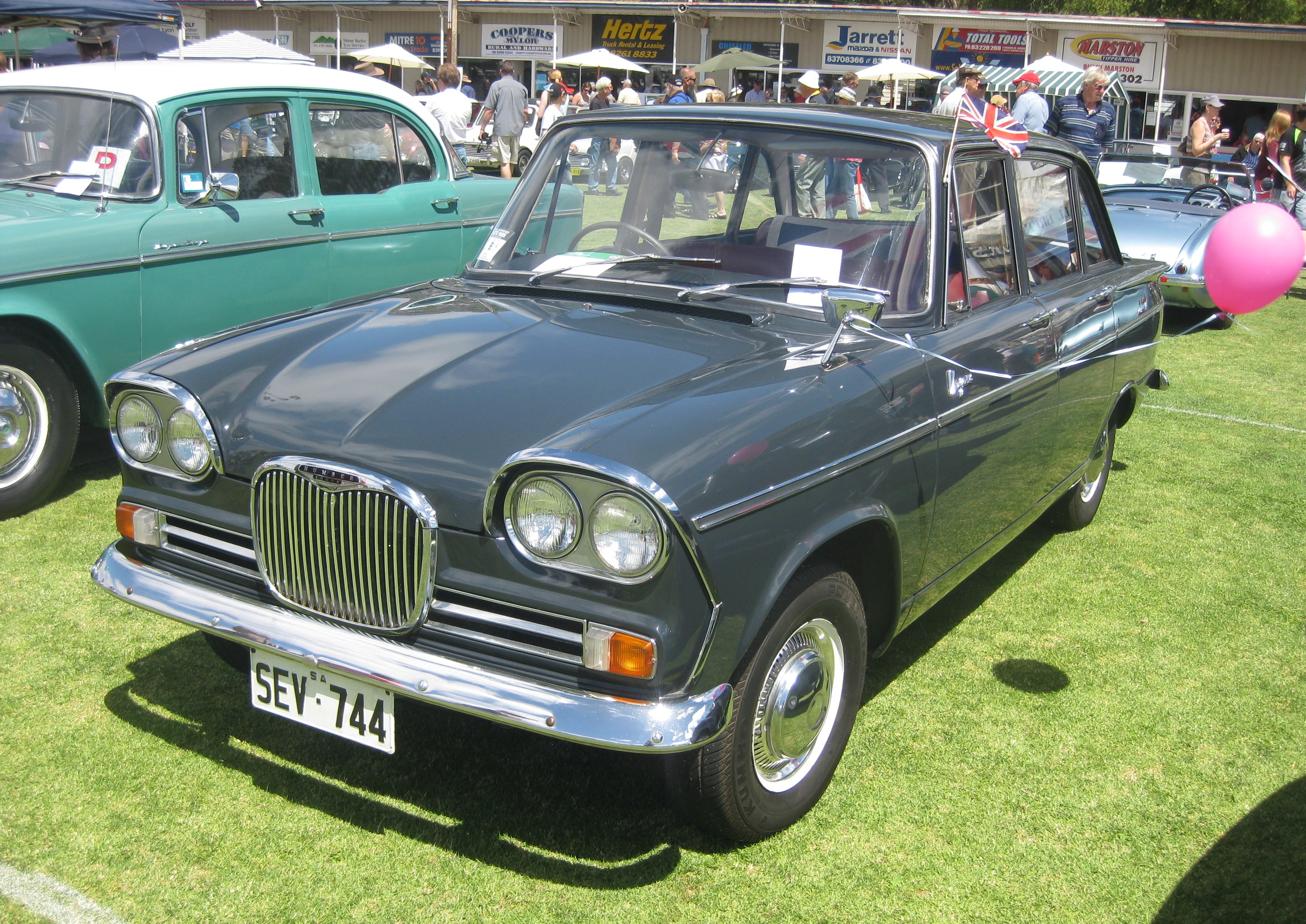
1965 Humber Vogue Series III

== Replacement ==
The Super Minx saloon and its Singer variants were replaced by the Rootes Arrow range when the Hillman Hunter and Singer Vogue were launched at the London Motor Show in October 1966. However, the Hunter was initially offered only as a saloon and accordingly the Super Minx estate car remained in production until April 1967.
