= Humber Sceptre =

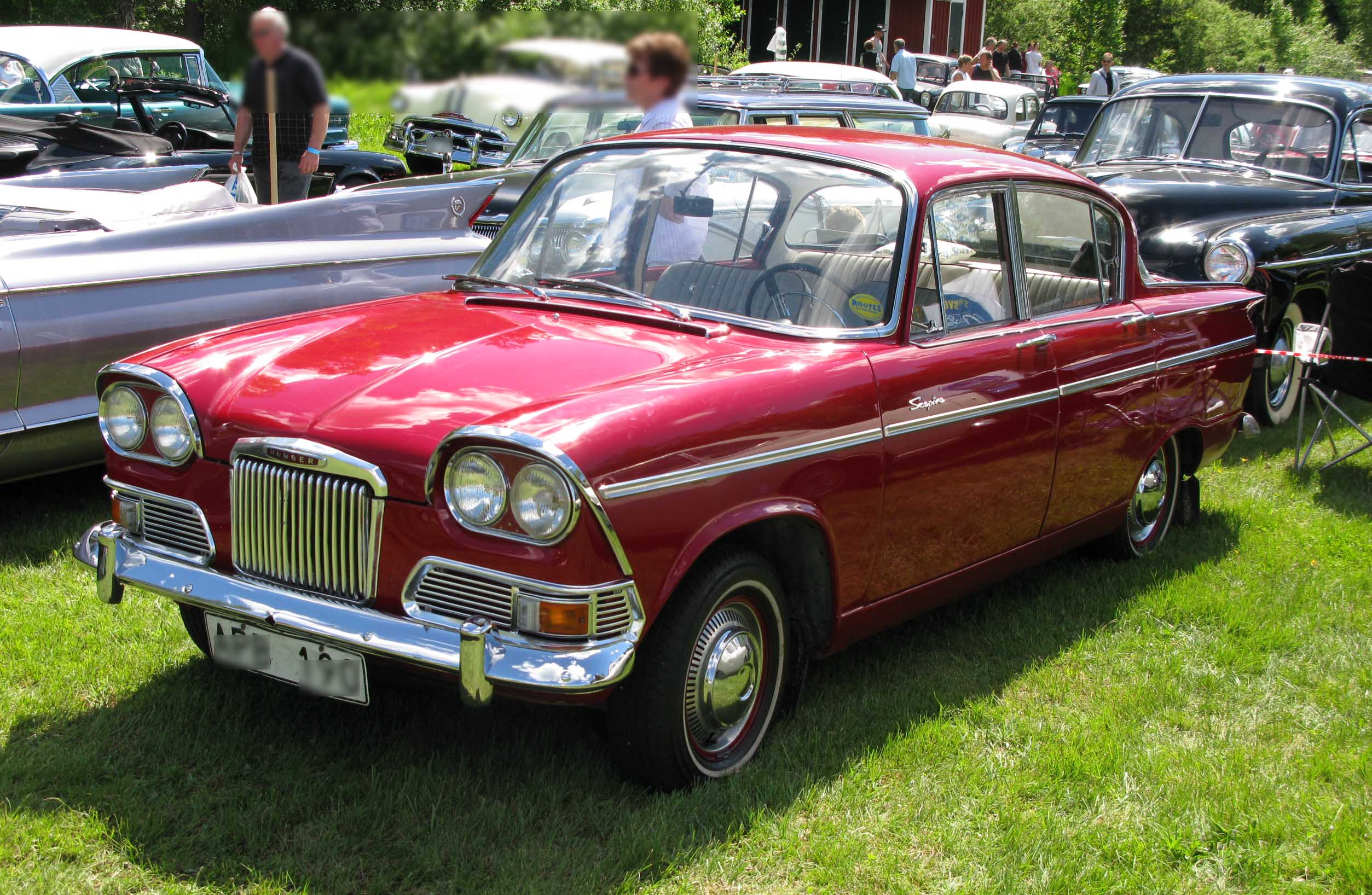
- 1964 Humber Sceptre MK I

Overview
- Manufacturer: Humber (Rootes Group, later Chrysler (UK) Ltd)
- Also called: Sunbeam Sceptre
- Production: 1963–1976
- Assembly: United Kingdom

Body and chassis
- Body style: 4-door saloon 4-door estate car
- Layout: FR layout

The Humber Sceptre is an automobile which was produced in the United Kingdom from 1963 to 1976 by Humber.

== MK I (1963 to 1965) ==
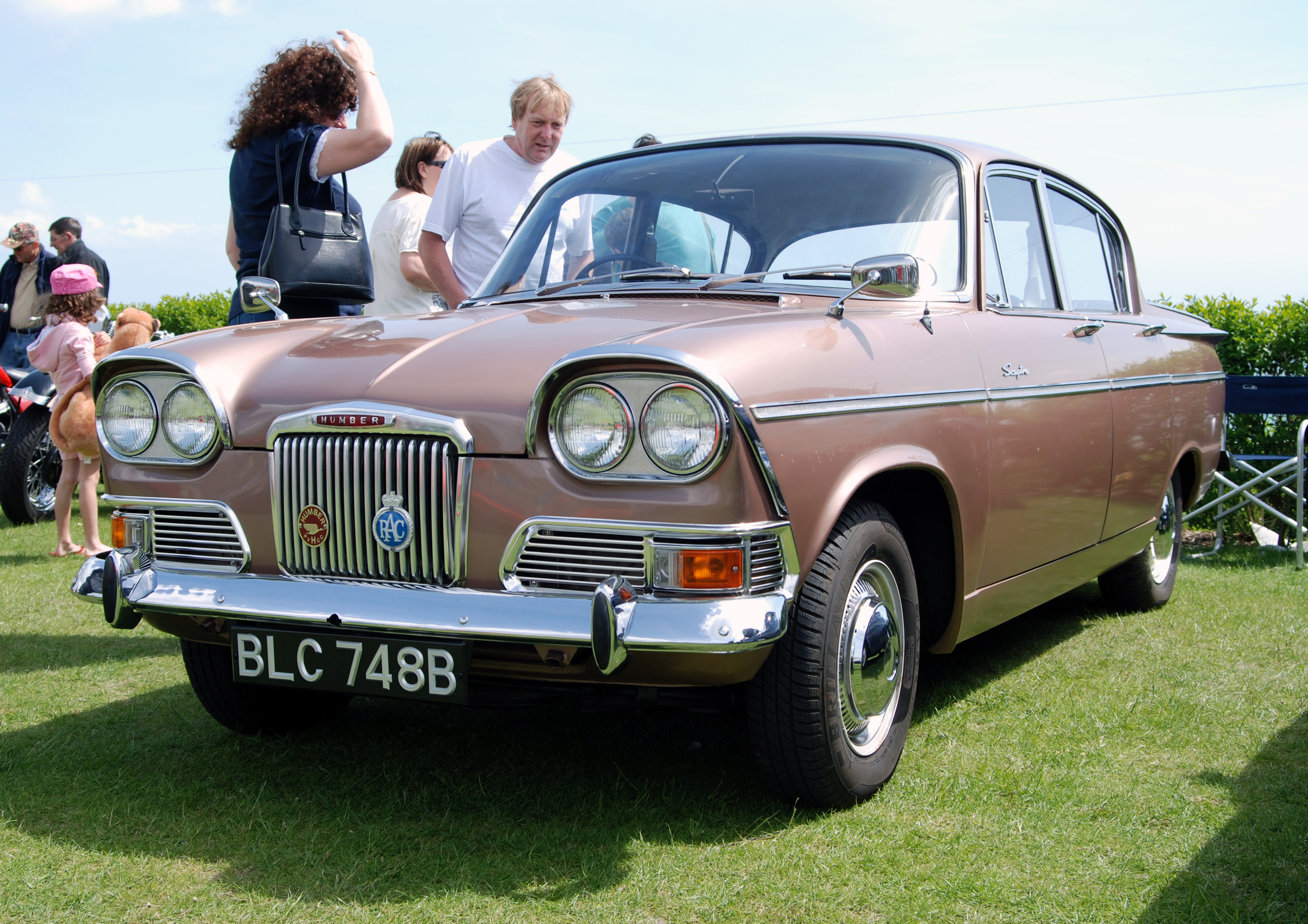
Humber Sceptre MK I

The Humber Sceptre MK I, introduced in 1963, was a luxury car based on the Hillman Super Minx. It featured a unique roof, glass and upper/rear bodywork not shared with the Super Minx or the related Singer Vogue. The Sceptre was originally intended as a four-door replacement for the Sunbeam Rapier, but was launched as a Humber, while the Rapier continued in production with little modification until 1967. This resulted in the Sceptre's more sporty character compared to traditional Humbers. The Sceptre was positioned at the top of the mid-range Rootes Group cars, above the Hillman Super Minx and Singer Vogue. It featured similar twin headlight styling to the Vogue and a more powerful 80 bhp (60 kW; 81 PS) version of the 1,592 cc (97.1 cu in) Minx engine. The high level of equipment included disc front brakes, overdrive, screen washers, reversing lamp, rev counter and a full range of instruments. Automatic transmission was made available later. A MK IA was introduced in 1964. Whilst the Super Minx and Vogue received revised six light styling in 1964, the Sceptre body continued unchanged until 1965 when it was replaced by the MK II. Production of the MK I and IA models totalled 17,011 units.

== MK II (1965 to 1967) ==
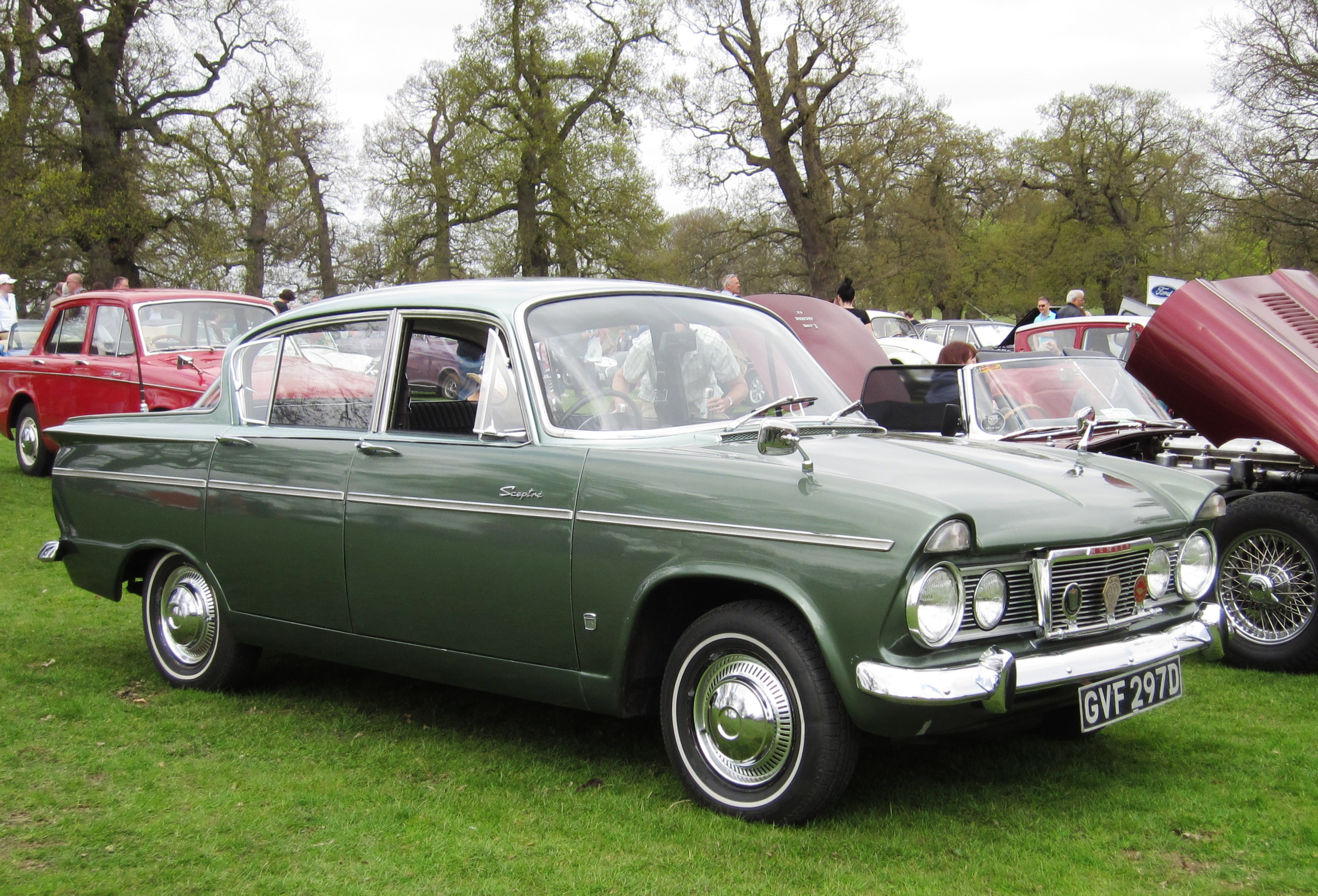
Humber Sceptre MK II

The Sceptre MK II, introduced in 1965, featured revised front end styling and a twin carburettor version of the 1,725 cc (105.3 cu in) engine. It was produced until 1967. Production of the MK II totalled 11,983 units.

The Mk II series of the Humber Sceptre was a capable car with performance figures recorded by Motor magazine, published in the edition dated 16 April 1966, Maximum 94.8 mph (mean), 0-60 mph 12.5secs, with a standing quarter-mile of 19.5secs.

== MK III (1967 to 1976) ==
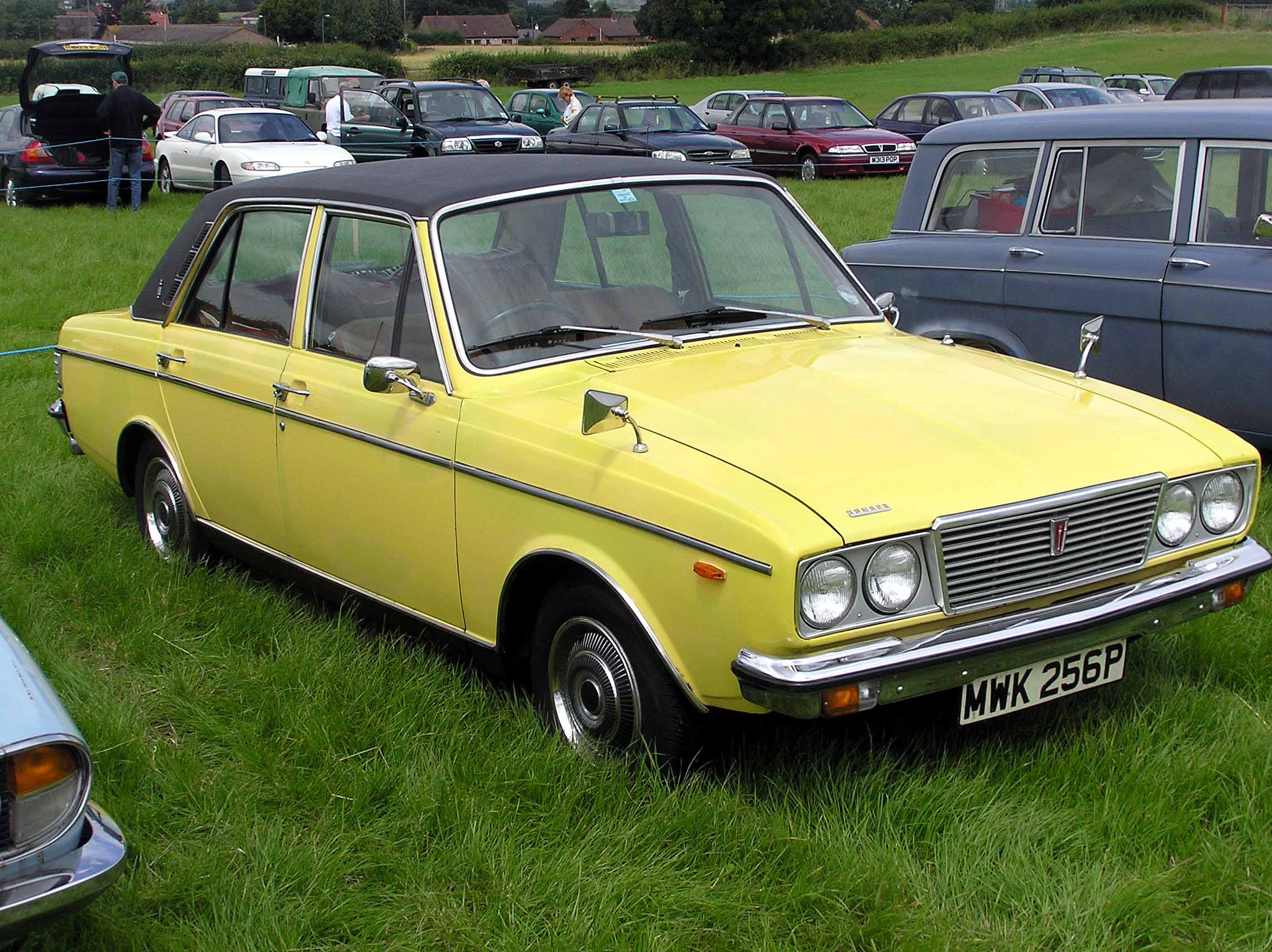
Humber Sceptre MK III Saloon

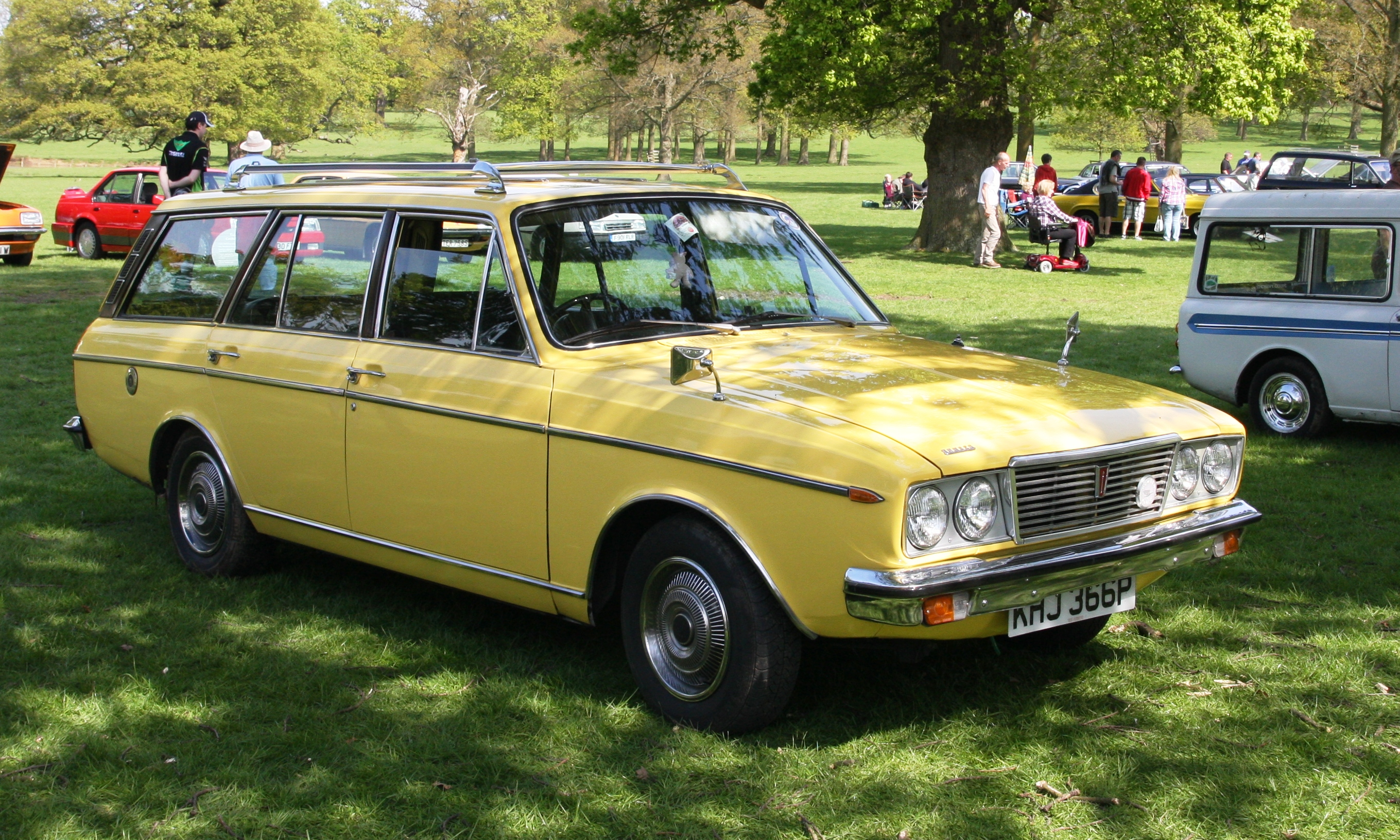
Humber Sceptre MK III Estate

The Sceptre MK III, introduced in 1967, was a derivative of the Rootes Arrow design and was the best-appointed version of this model offered by Rootes. It continued Humber's tradition of building luxury cars and featured wood-veneer fascia, complete instrumentation, adjustable steering column, vinyl roof and extra brightwork on the wheel arches and rear panel. The MK III had a more powerful version of the 1,725 cc (105.3 cu in) engine with twin carburettors giving 87 bhp (65 kW; 88 PS). The manual-gearbox model featured either the D-type or the later J-type Laycock De Normanville overdrive, with the J-type fitted from chassis numbers L3 onwards starting in July 1972. As with all models in the Arrow range, an automatic gearbox was an option. A closer ratio G-type gearbox was fitted to later Sceptres, using the J-type overdrive. An estate car variant of the Sceptre was introduced at the London Motor Show in October 1974. It featured a built-in roof rack and a carpeted loading floor protected by metal strips and illuminated by an additional interior light. Washer and wiper were provided for the rear window, a rare feature on UK-market estate cars of the time.

The Sceptre was discontinued in September 1976, along with the Humber and Hillman marque names. From that time, all models in the Chrysler UK range were branded as Chryslers. Production of the MK III totaled 43,951 units.

== Use of the Sceptre name by Peugeot ==
The name "Sceptre" reappeared in 1990 for some SRi versions of the Peugeot 205, 405 and 605. Peugeot had bought Chrysler's European operations (which also included French carmaker Simca) in 1978 and rebranded the whole European Chrysler range under the Talbot marque.
