= Rootes Australia =

Australian affiliate of the Rootes Group

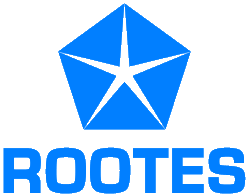
- Industry: Automotive
- Founded: 1945
- Defunct: 1965; 61 years ago
- Fate: Merged with Chrysler Australia
- Headquarters: Port Melbourne, Australia
- Area served: Australia
- Products: Automobiles
- Brands: Hillman; Humber; Singer; Sunbeam
- Parent: Rootes Group

Rootes Australia was the Australian affiliate of the Rootes Group, a British motor vehicle manufacturing company.

The company was formed immediately after the Second World War initially operating as an importing and distribution firm. In 1946, it began assembling Hillman Minx vehicles at Port Melbourne, Victoria. This was the first instance of a British motor manufacturer establishing a production line in Australia. By 1954, the company had gained a 5.4% share of the local market and subsequently announced plans to create a full local manufacturing facility. A 35-hectare site was acquired for this purpose at Harrisfield (now known as Noble Park), near Dandenong in Victoria. However, the proposed plant was never built.

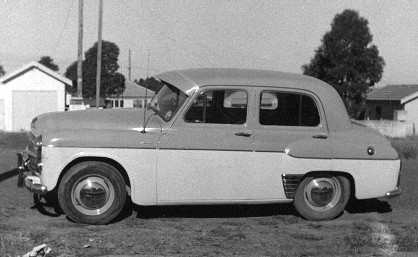
The Hillman Minx was the first and most popular Rootes Australia vehicle. This is a 1956 Mark VIII Gaylook De Luxe Saloon.

Hillman, Humber and Singer models were assembled successfully for a number of years. The company also produced models which were hybrids of the three makes. By the mid-1960s, falling sales and an ageing model line-up meant the Rootes Group was in trouble both in Britain and Australia.

In December 1965, Rootes Australia was merged with Chrysler Australia. Assembly operations were continued at the Port Melbourne facility and Hillman cars, Humber cars and Commer trucks were now sold by Chrysler dealers. Chrysler was quick to phase out the Humber brand, however assembly of the Hillman Arrow and Hunter range was commenced in early 1967. Chrysler Australia also utilised Port Melbourne for assembly of the Dodge Phoenix from 1968 and Mitsubishi's Galant from 1971. The last Hillman Hunter was produced in November 1972, and, with Dodge Phoenix and Galant assembly transferred to Tonsley Park in South Australia at the end of 1972, the Port Melbourne facility was closed.

== Vehicles produced ==
Significant models produced by Rootes Australia included the following:

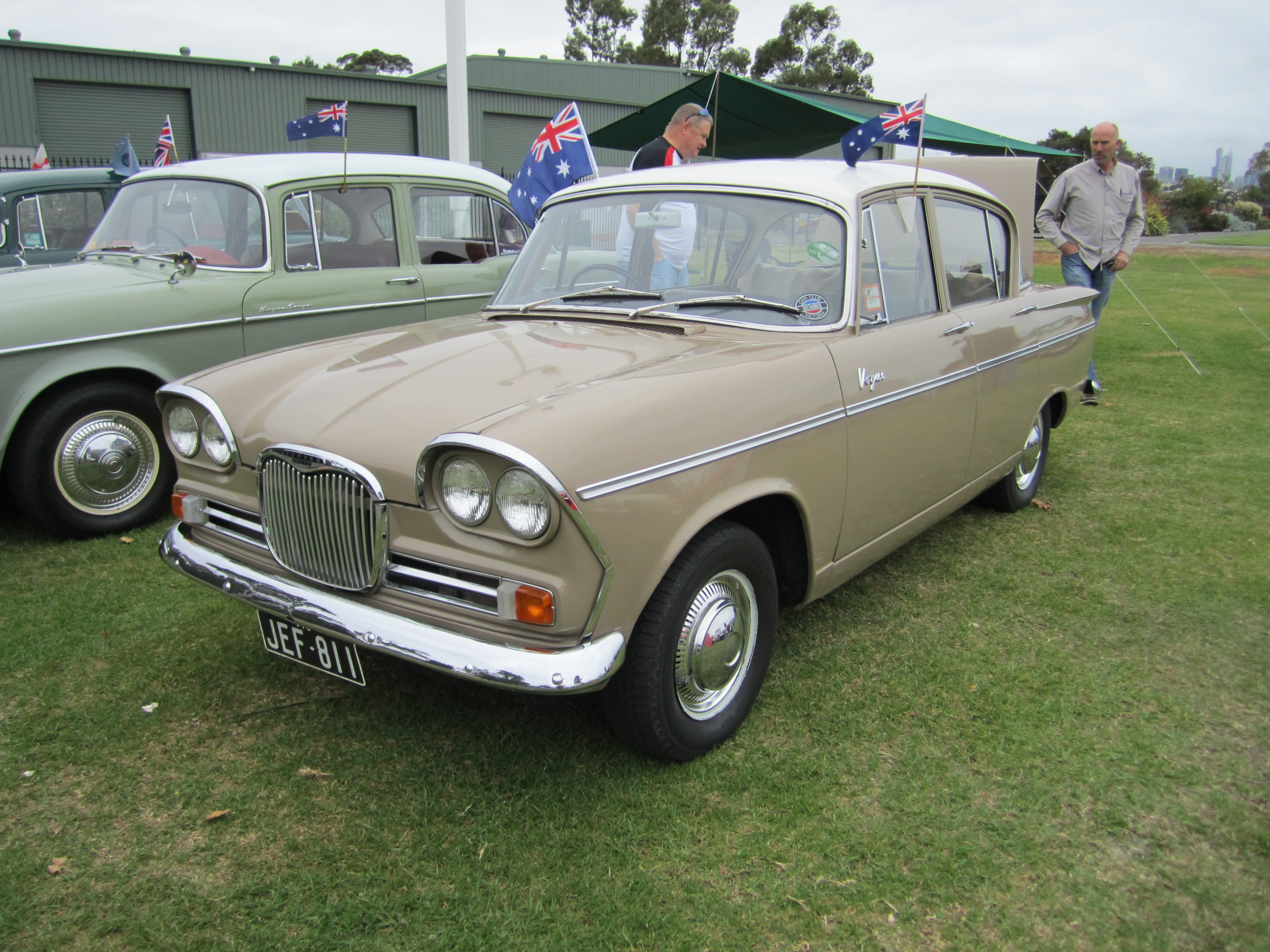
The Humber Vogue was assembled from 1962 to 1965.

- Hillman Minx - assembled from 1946.
- Humber Super Snipe - assembled from 1953.
- Sunbeam Mk III - assembled circa 1955
- Sunbeam Alpine - assembled circa 1955
- Humber Hawk – assembled to 1964
- Singer Gazelle - assembled from 1957 to 1961
- Hillman Super Minx
- Humber Vogue - assembled from 1962 to 1965.
- Hillman Imp - from 1964
