= Singer Vogue =

Motor vehicle

The Singer Vogue name has been applied to two 1960s generations of motor cars from the British manufacturer Singer.

== Vogue Series I/II/III/IV ==
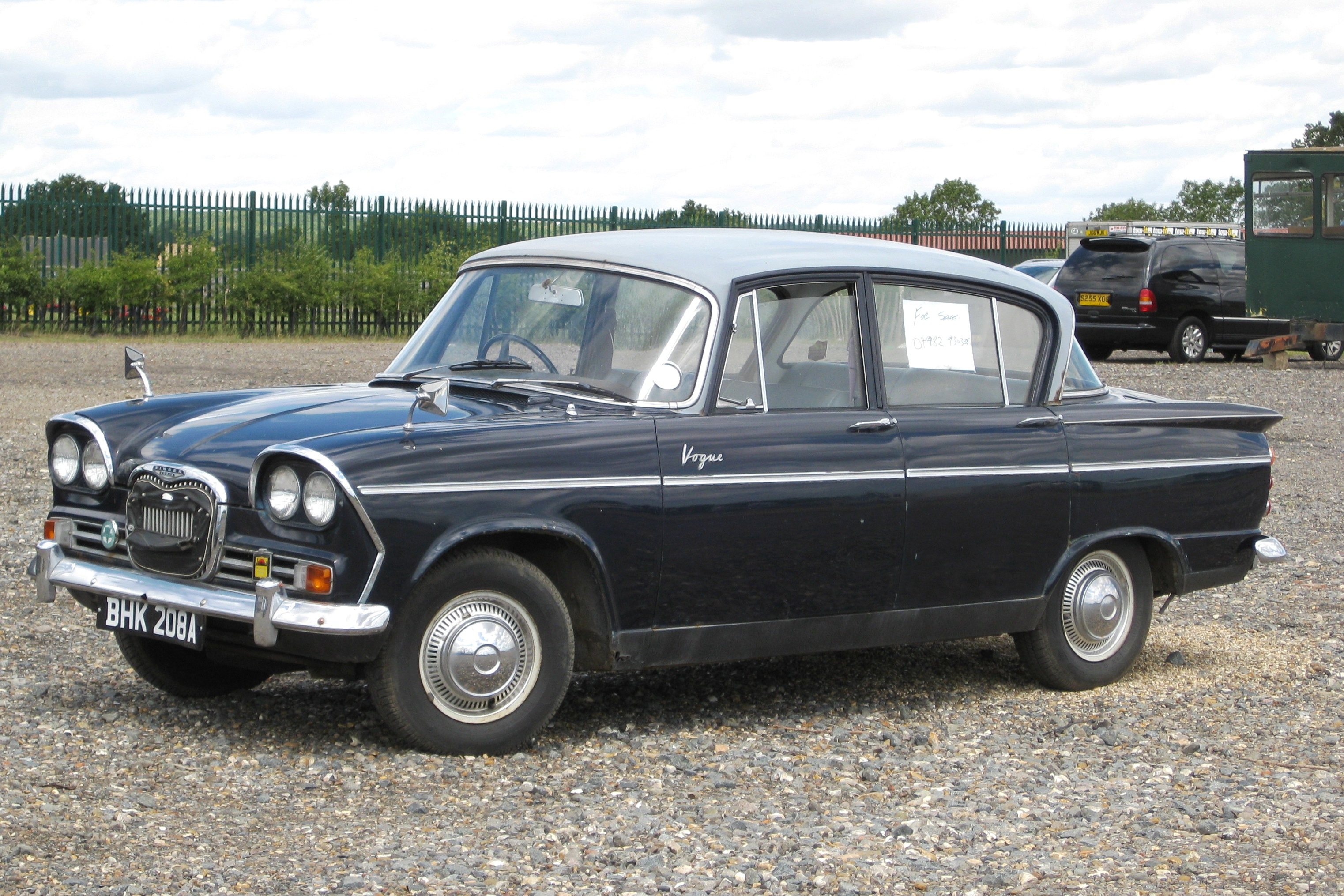
Singer Vogue 1963. This appears to be one of the first Series II cars in the UK with a suffix letter ("A") on its registration plate.

The first generation Singer Vogue I/II/III/IV models of 1961 to 1966, was a badge engineered version of the Hillman Super Minx. Introduced in July 1961, it was positioned above the Super Minx and Singer Gazelle in the Rootes Group range, and had twin headlights as well as a more powerful 66 bhp (49 kW; 67 PS) version of the 1,592 cc (97.1 cu in) Minx engine. The Series II version for 1963 had front disc brakes as standard, changes to the interior, removal of the chrome bonnet strip and a change to amber front indicator lenses. The Series III of 1964 gained six light bodywork and an increase in power to 84 bhp (63 kW; 85 PS). The final version of this generation, the Series IV was introduced at the 1965 motor show and saw the engine size increased to 1,725 cc (105.3 cu in) although there was no change in power output. The first generation Vogue was offered as a four door saloon and as an estate car.

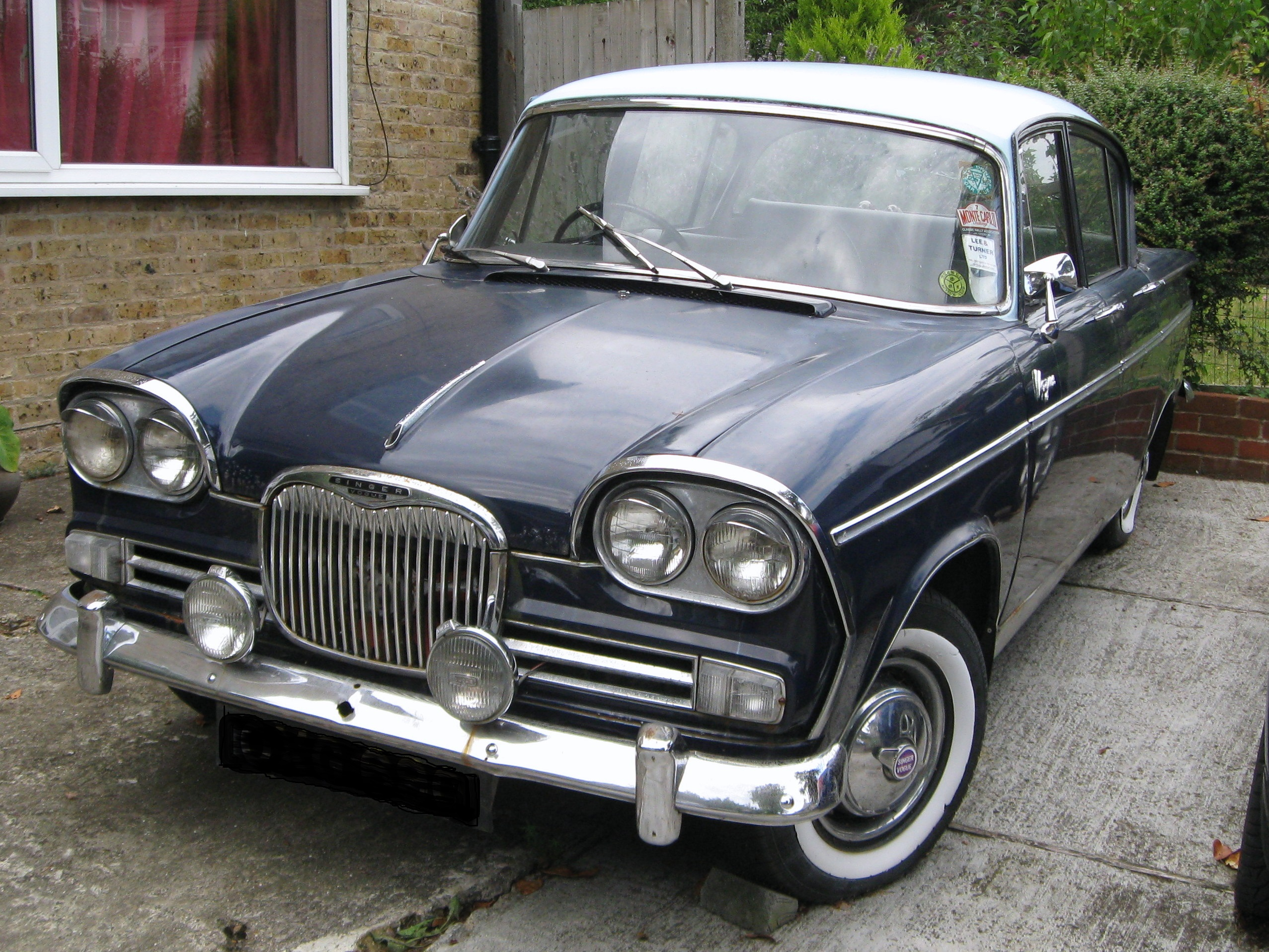
Singer Vogue Series I, with chrome bonnet strip and white indicators

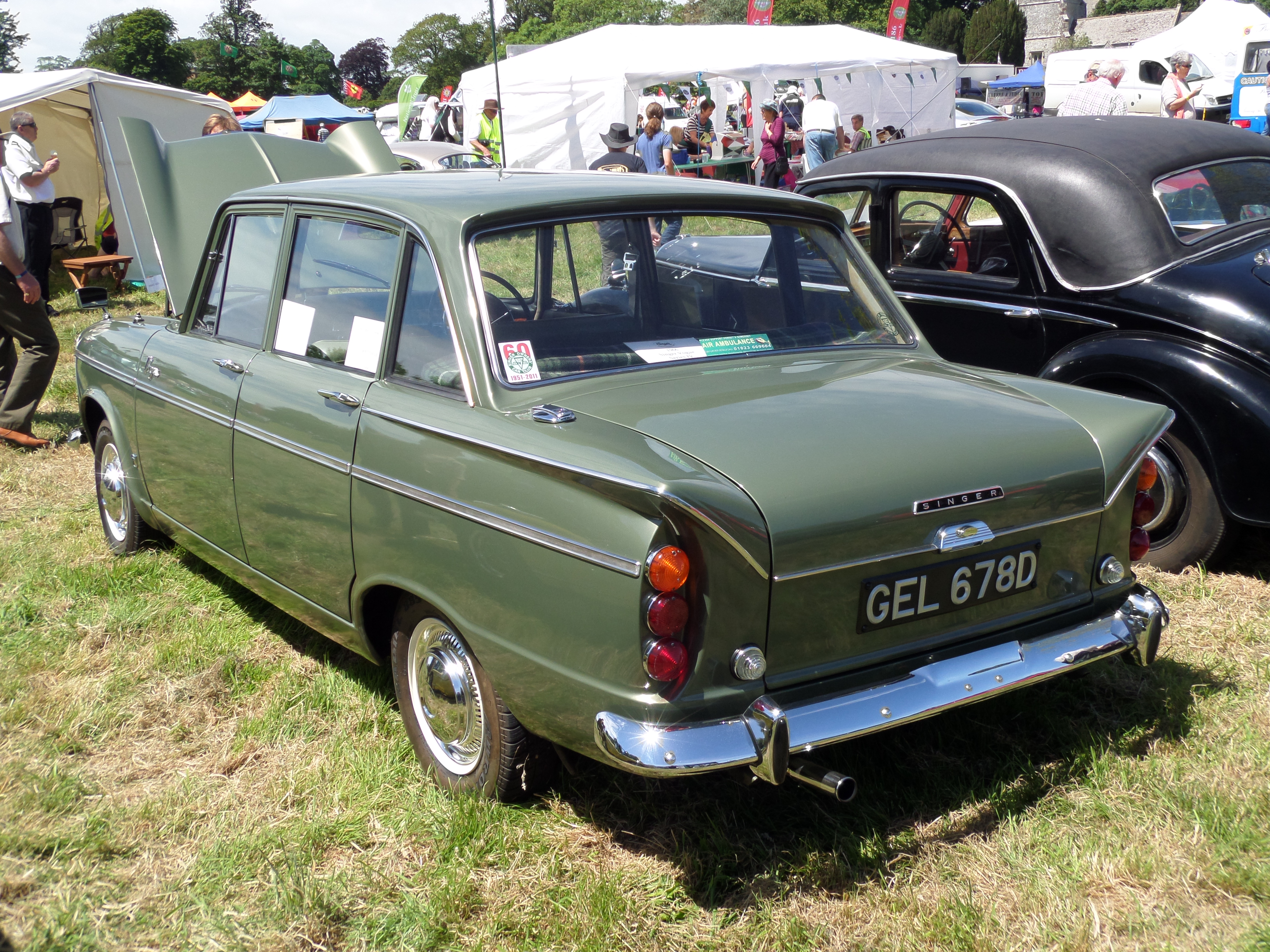
Singer Vogue Series IV saloon

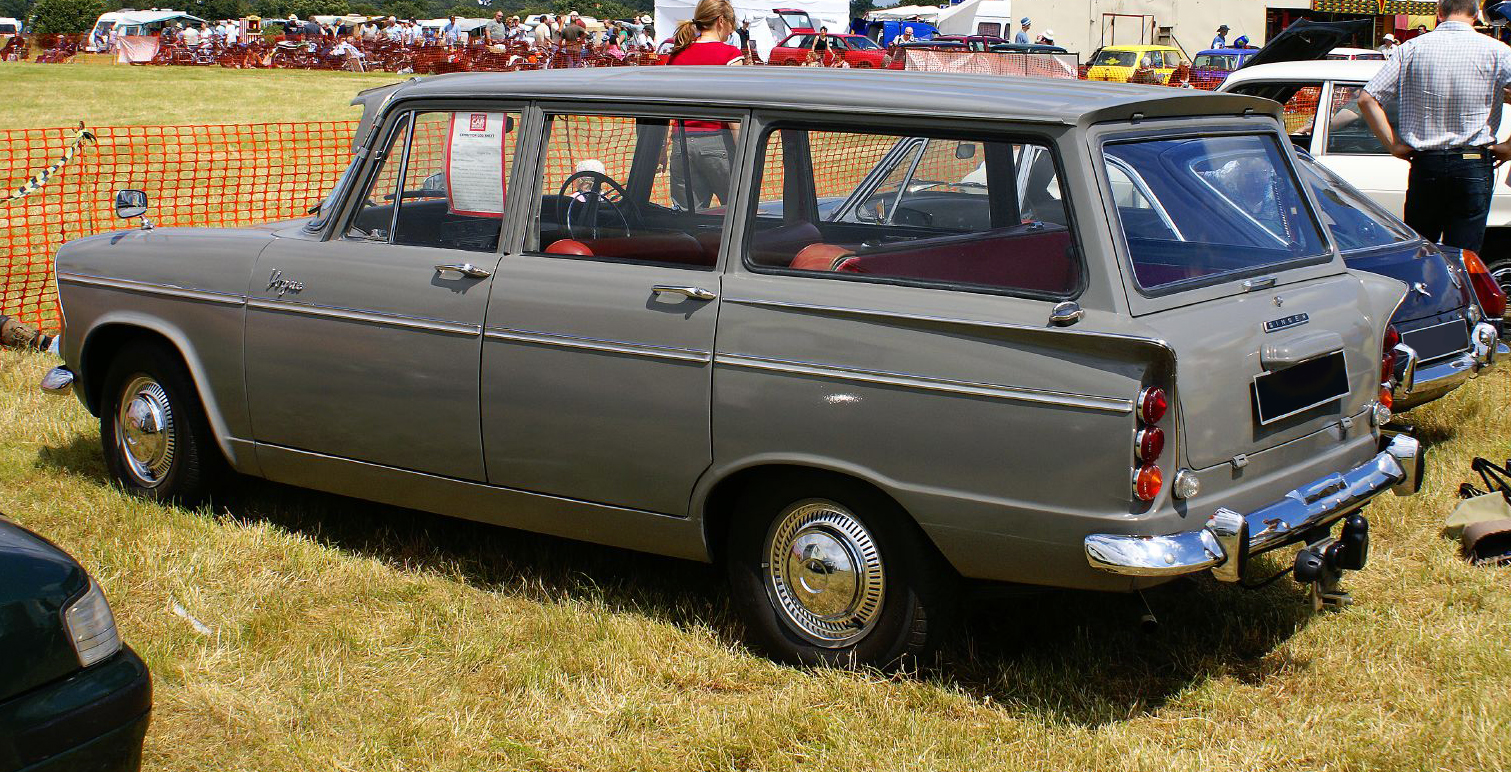
Singer Vogue Estate of 1965

=== Australian production as the Humber Vogue ===
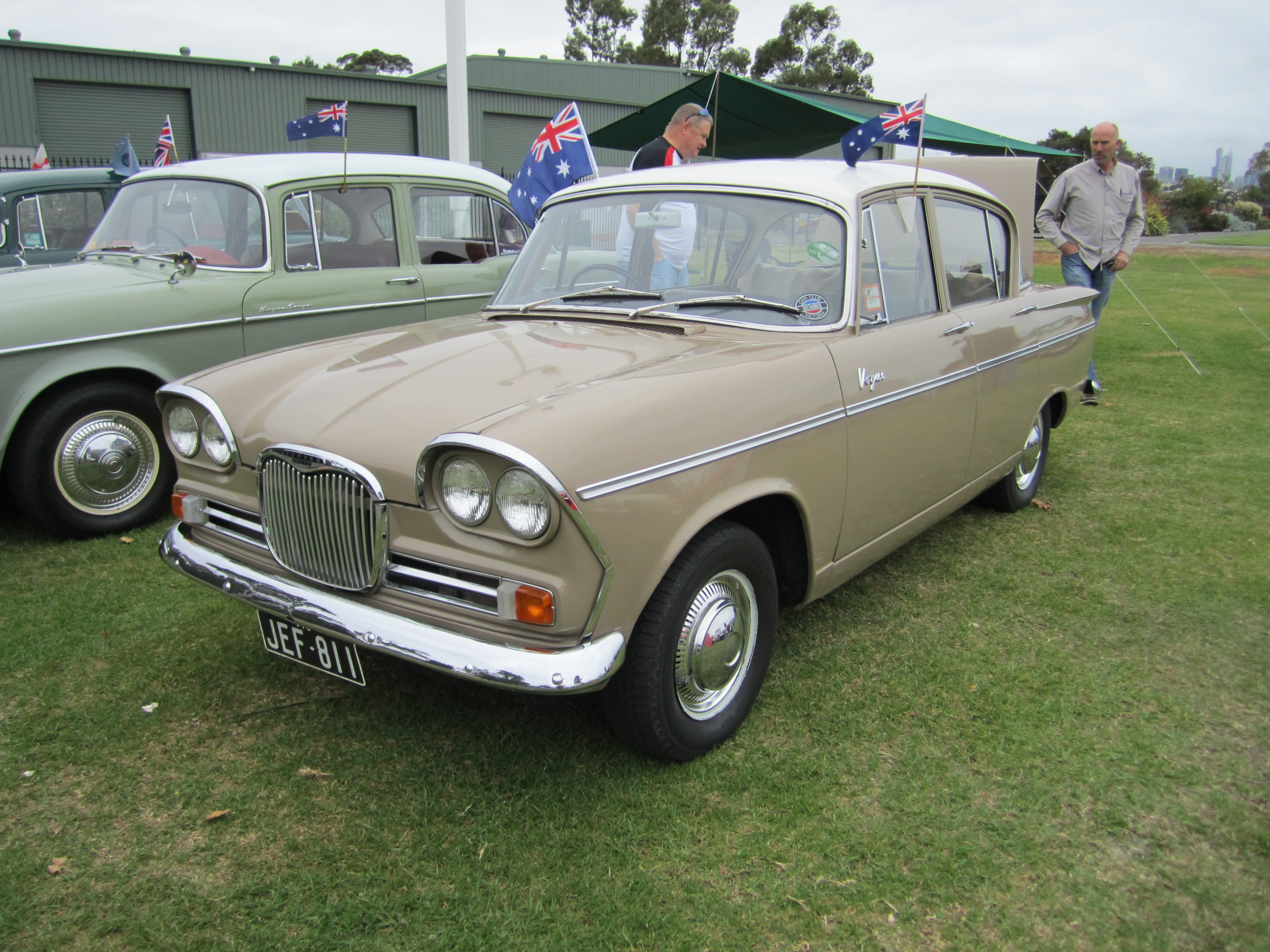
Humber Vogue Series I

The Vogue was also produced in Australia, by Rootes Australia, and was marketed as the Humber Vogue. It was introduced in 1963 and was followed by the Vogue Sports which was fitted with a Sunbeam Rapier engine that provided a 35 per cent increase in power to 85.5 hp (64 kW; 87 PS). The Vogue Sports also featured improved suspension, brakes and wheels. The Rapier-powered Vogue III was introduced in early 1965 at which time the Vogue Sports was discontinued. This Series III version featured a squared roofline as introduced on the Singer Vogue III in 1964. Australian production of the Vogue ceased in 1966 following the takeover of Rootes Australia by Chrysler Australia.

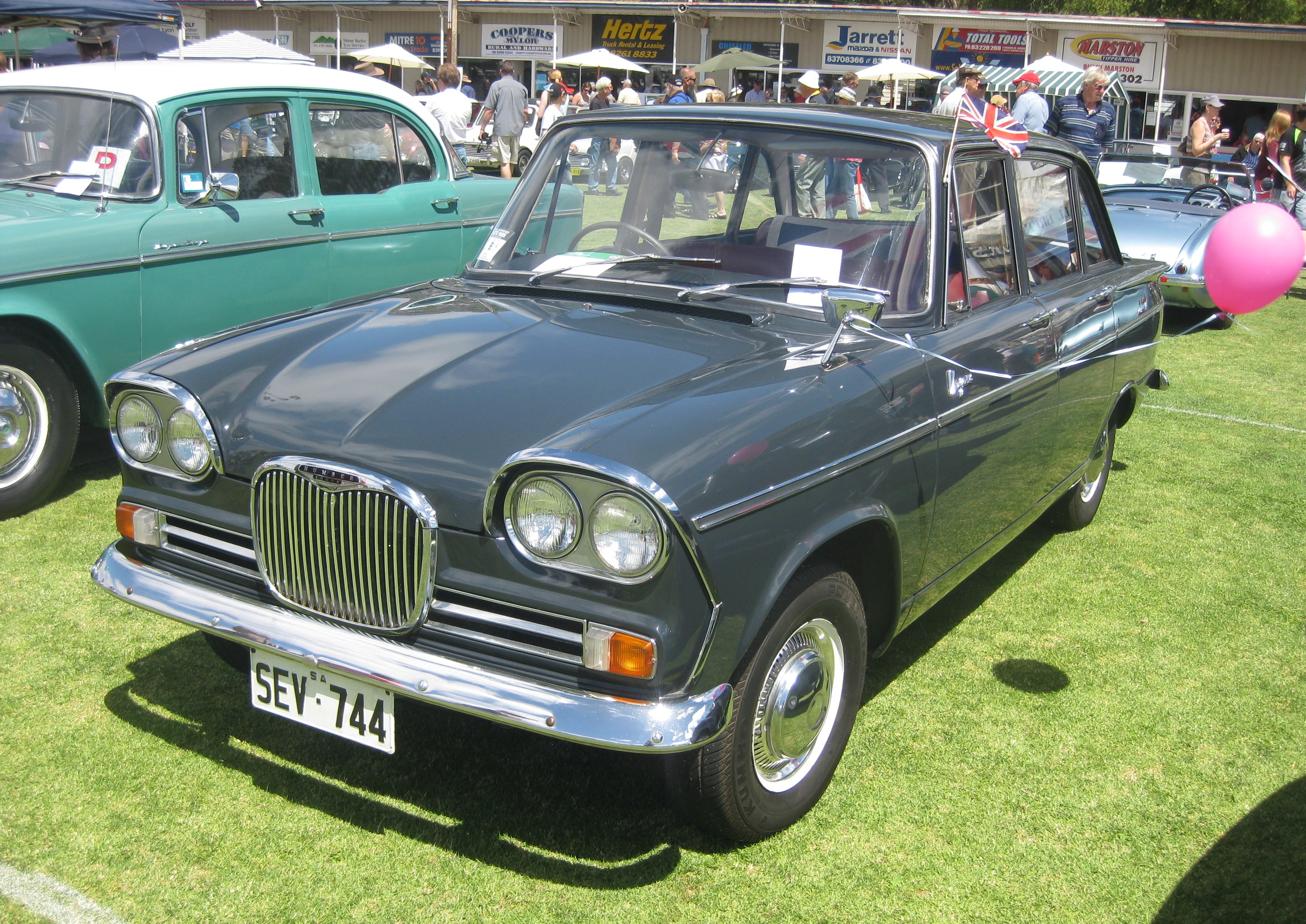
Humber Vogue Series III of 1965

== New Vogue ==
The second generation Singer New Vogue launched at the 1966 British International Motor Show, was a badge engineered version of the Rootes Arrow saloon. More upmarket than the Hillman Hunter, it was powered by the same 1,725 cc (105.3 cu in) engine and was the first British car to feature rectangular headlamps. An estate version was released in April 1967. In New Zealand, Todd Motors produced a Singer Vogue as an up-market version of the Hunter. Prime differences were its wooden dashboard and door cappings. Along with all other Singer models, the Vogue was discontinued in 1970 to be replaced by the short lived Sunbeam Vogue.

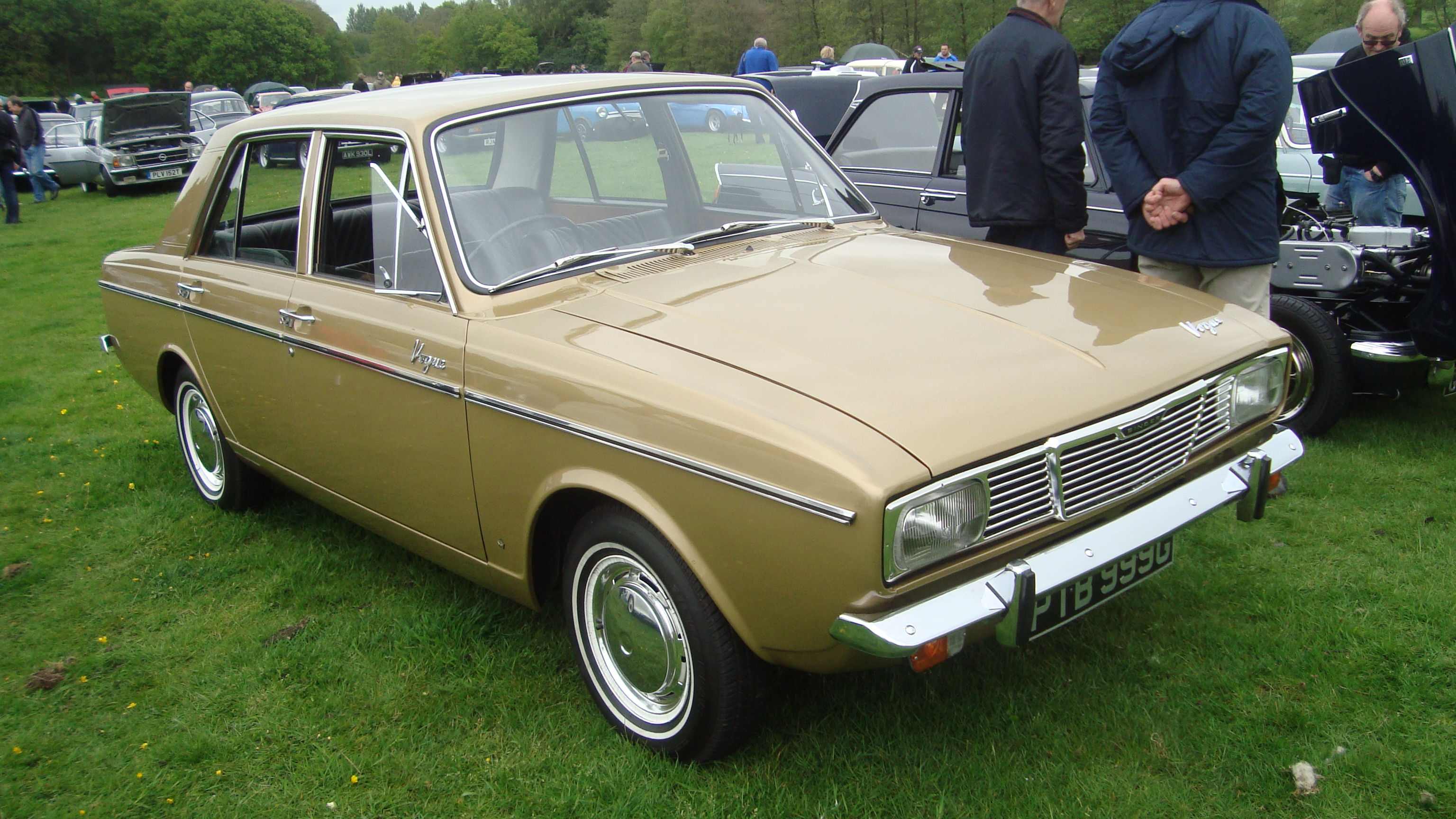
1969 Singer Vogue saloon

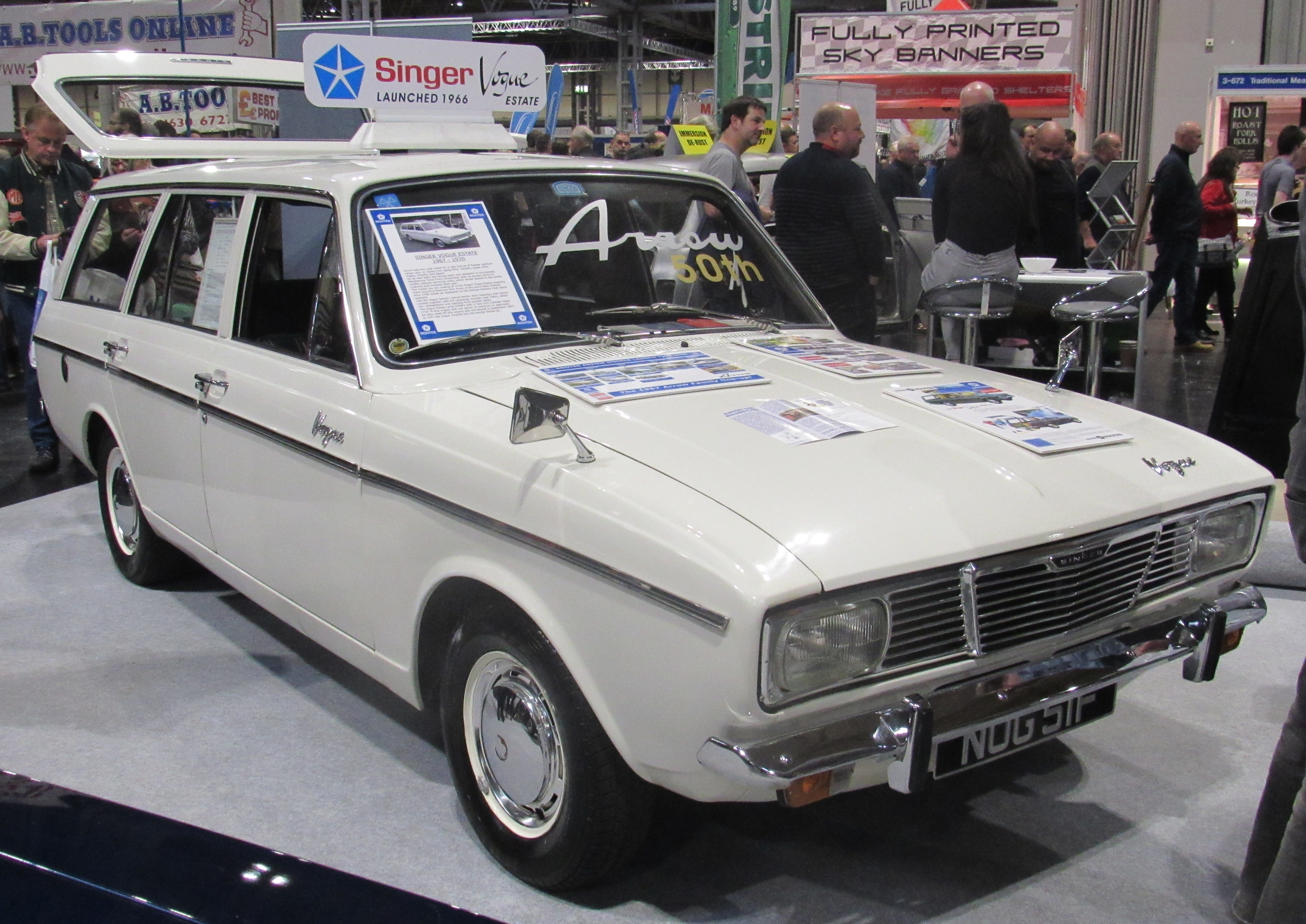
1968 Singer Vogue Estate

== Scale models ==
- Meccano Dinky Toys; No. 145 (production 1962–66), Series 1 Vogue, approximately O scale (1:44).
