= Sunbeam Rapier =

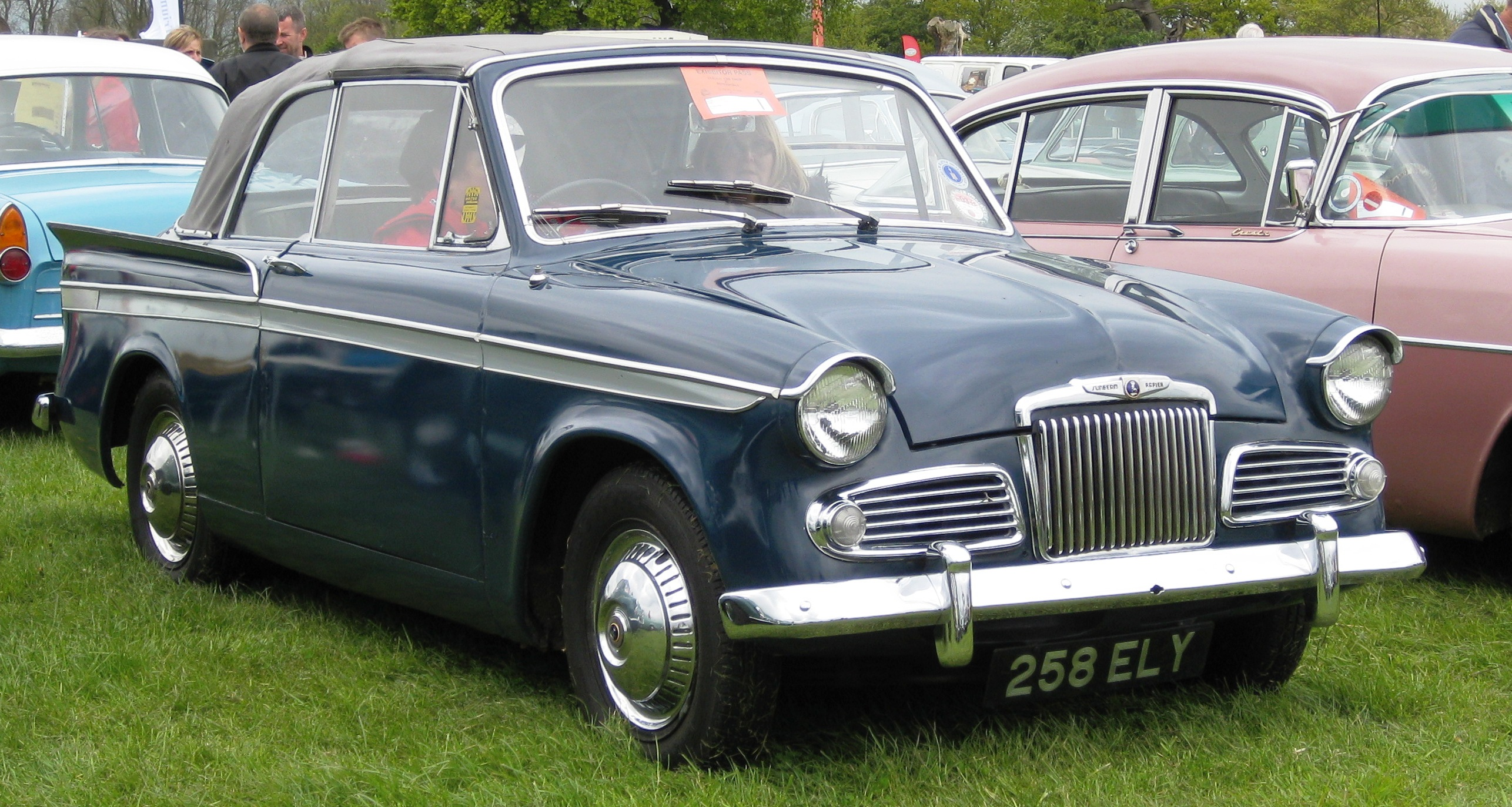
- Sunbeam Rapier IIIA convertible

Overview
- Manufacturer: Rootes Group
- Production: 1955–1976

Body and chassis
- Body style: 2 door saloon 2 door convertible 2 door fastback coupe
- Related: Hillman Minx; Singer Gazelle; Sunbeam Alpine Fastback coupé

Chronology
- Predecessor: Sunbeam Mark III
- Successor: none

The Sunbeam Rapier is an automobile produced by Rootes Group from 1955 until 1976, in two different generations, the "Series" cars (which underwent several revisions) and the later (1967–76) fastback shape, part of the "Arrow" range.

The first generation Rapier was the first of the "Audax" range of light cars produced by the Rootes Group, in this instance as part of their Sunbeam marque. Announced at the London Motor Show in October 1955, it preceded its Hillman Minx and Singer Gazelle counterparts which were not introduced until 1956.

A four-seat, two-door hardtop coupé – designated Series I with the introduction of the Series II in 1958 – it was different from the Sunbeam Mark III, the car it would eventually replace. Although designed "in house" by the Rootes Group, it was inspired, via the Raymond Loewy design organisation, by the new-generation Studebaker coupés of 1953.

== Series I ==
Sunbeam Rapier I
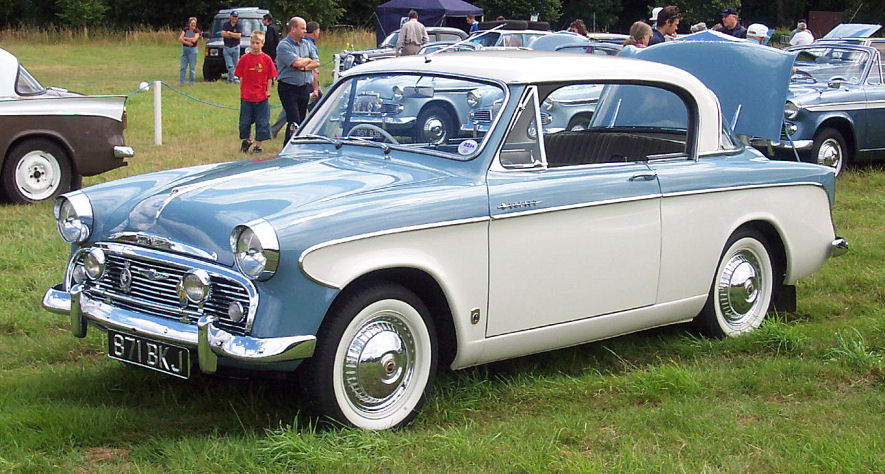

Overview
- Production: 1955–1958; 7,477 produced.

Body and chassis
- Body style: 2 door saloon

Powertrain
- Engine: 1,390 cc OHV I4

Dimensions
- Wheelbase: 96 in (2,400 mm)
- Length: 160 in (4,100 mm)
- Width: 60 in (1,500 mm)
- Height: 57 in (1,400 mm)

The styling of the Series I Rapier was undertaken by the design firm of Raymond Loewy Associates and showed a great deal of influence of Raymond Loewy's 1953 Studebaker Starliner and subsequent Hawk (itself an acclaimed design). Announced in October 1955 for the Motor Show and available in a range of two-tone colour schemes typical of the period, it had a steering column gear change, Two-tone Kangaroo leather trim and a Laycock de Normanville overdrive as standard fittings. Vinyl trim was an option in the UK and standard in certain export territories. Rapier bodies were built by Pressed Steel, shipped to Thrupp & Maberly in north London where they were painted and trimmed, then shipped again to the Rootes assembly plant at Ryton-on-Dunsmore near Coventry where the engines, transmission and running gear were fitted. This complex situation persisted until late 1963 when the Series IV was introduced.

The Rapier's 1,390 cc (85 cu in) engine was essentially the same as that fitted to the Hillman Minx but with a raised compression ratio (8:1 instead of 7:1), a Zenith DIF 36 carburettor and revised inlet and exhaust manifolds. In this form it developed 62.5 bhp (47 kW) at 5000 rpm. A column change, 4-speed transmission with overdrive on third and top was included in the price as a standard feature.

From October 1956, directly as a result of experience gained in international rallying by Rootes' competition department, the Rapier was fitted with the updated R67 engine on which the Stromberg carburettor was replaced by twin Zenith 36 WIP carburettors on a new inlet manifold. This engine produced 67.5 bhp (50 kW) at 5000 rpm, the effect of which was to reduce the Rapier's 0-60 mph (97 km/h) time by almost 1 second and increase its top speed by 3 mph (5 km/h).

British magazine The Motor tested a Series I twin carburettor saloon in 1957, recording a top speed of 85.7 mph (138 km/h) and acceleration from 0–60 mph (97 km/h) in 20.9 seconds and a fuel consumption of 30.5 miles per imperial gallon (9.3 L/100 km; 25.4 mpg_{‑US}). The test car cost £1043 including taxes of £348.

In competition, a Rapier driven by Peter Harper finished in fifth place in the 1958 Monte Carlo Rally.

In total, 7,477 units were produced of this initial version of the Sunbeam Rapier. It was discontinued in 1958 on the introduction of the Series II.

== Series II ==
Sunbeam Rapier II
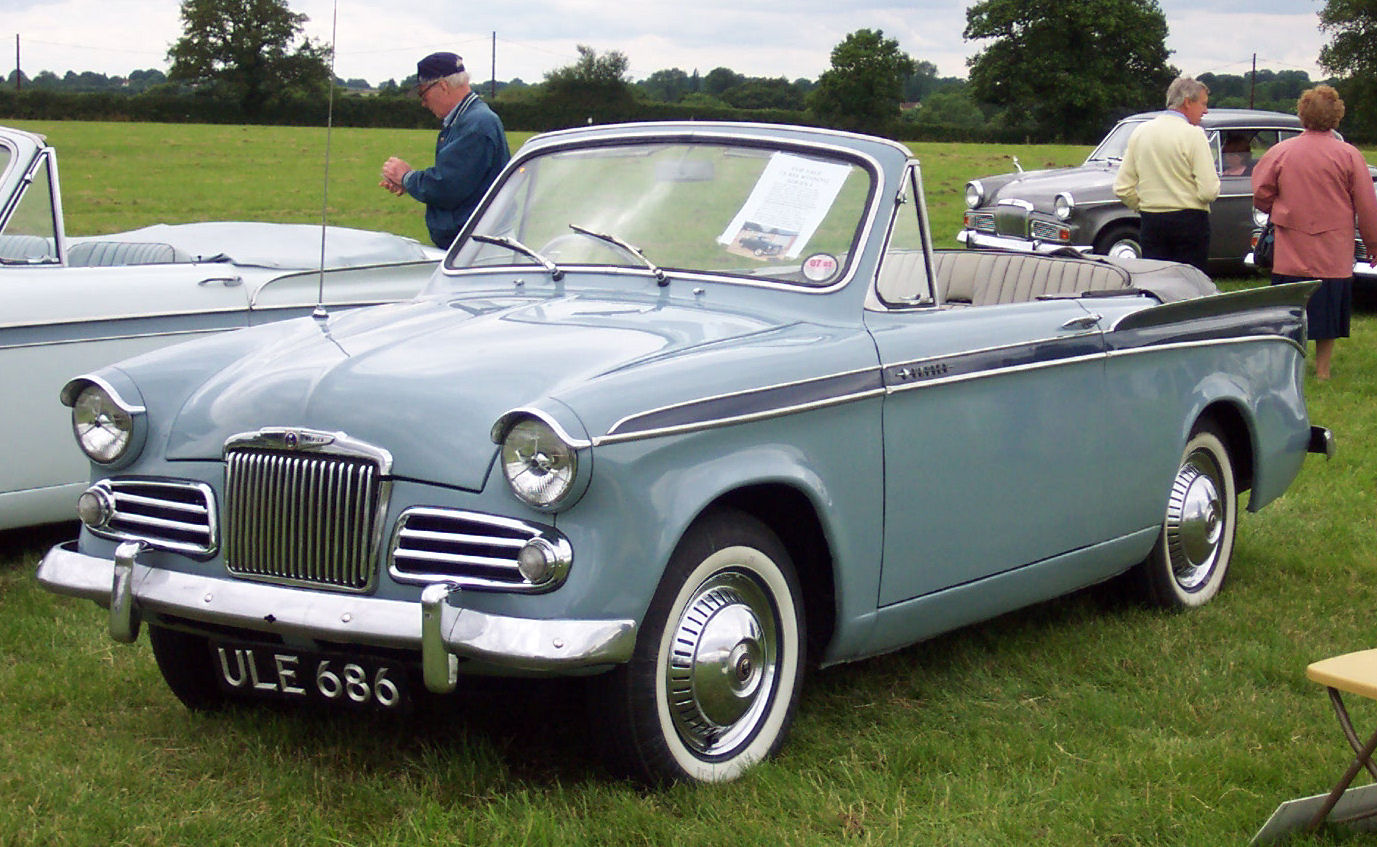

Overview
- Production: 1958–1959; 15,151 produced.

Body and chassis
- Body style: 2 door saloon 2 door convertible

Powertrain
- Engine: 1,494 cc OHV I4

The Sunbeam Rapier Series II was announced on 6 February 1958, available in hardtop and convertible forms. Rootes arranged for nine of the new cars to be in Monte Carlo for the press to try at the end of the 1958 Monte Carlo Rally.

The traditional Sunbeam radiator grille was reintroduced, albeit shortened and widened and the spaces at its sides were filled with horizontal side grilles. The two-tone lower body colour scheme of the Series I was discontinued in favour of a broad full length flash in the same colour as the roof, but the most obvious change was the appearance on the rear wings of pronounced fins.

The interior of the Series II was little changed from that of the Series I, except that a floor gear change replaced the column change, a modification, developed on the works Series I rally cars. To keep costs down, the leather upholstery, standard on the Series I, was discontinued in favour of vinyl and overdrive became an extra cost option.

An improvement in the Series II though, was its more powerful engine. Referred to as the Rallymaster, it had an increased capacity of 1,494 cc (91.2 cu in). The capacity increase combined with a higher compression ratio of 8.5:1 and larger inlet and exhaust valves to raise the power output to 73 bhp (54 kW) at 5,200 rpm. Autocar quoted the top speed as 91 mph (146 km/h) with a 0-60 mph (97 km/h) time of 20.2 seconds. Also as a direct result of competition experience, the Series II was fitted with larger front brakes and a recirculating ball steering box instead of the worm and nut box of the Series I.

The Series II was discontinued in favour of the Series III in 1959 after 15,151 units (hardtop and convertible) had been built.

== Series III ==
Sunbeam Rapier III
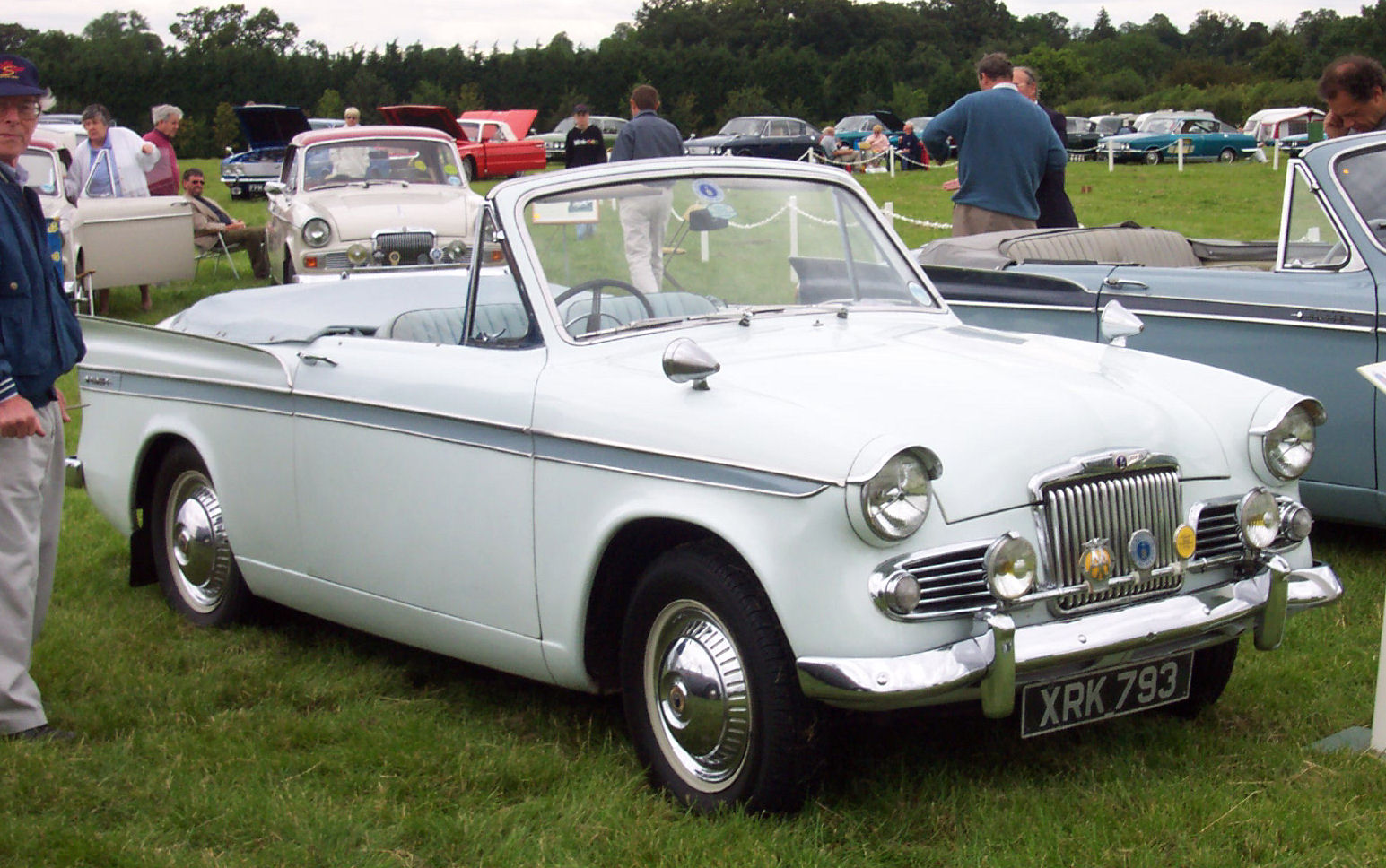

Overview
- Production: 1959–1961; 15,368 produced.

Body and chassis
- Body style: 2 door saloon 2 door convertible

Powertrain
- Engine: 1,494 cc OHV I4

The Series III was introduced in September 1959.

Rootes made subtle changes to the car's body which individually were insignificant but when combined, considerably altered its appearance. For example, the number of horizontal bars in each of the side grilles was increased from three to four and the boot lid acquired an oblong number plate recess and surround in place of the square one of the earlier cars. The most striking change was the redesigned side flash, now narrower and lower down the side of the car with the Rapier script on its rear end. The most subtle change, however, was a reduction in thickness of the windscreen pillars and a lowering of the scuttle line to give a 20% increase in windscreen area.

Inside the Series III the changes were more evident. Rootes stylists completely redesigned the seats and interior panels and specified that they be trimmed in single colour vinyl with contrasting piping. For the first time, deep pile carpets were fitted as standard in the foot-wells (previous versions had rubber mats). The steering wheel, control knobs and switches were in black plastic instead of beige. The dashboard, instead of being, as in the earlier cars, padded metal and plastic, was covered in burr walnut veneer surmounted by a padded crash roll fitted with black-faced British Jaeger instruments.

Mechanically, the Series III benefited from the design of the Sunbeam Alpine sports car with which it shared its engine. Although the engine's displacement was still 1,494 cc (91.2 cu in), it was fitted with a new eight-port aluminium cylinder head with an increased compression ratio and redesigned valves, and used a new, sportier camshaft. The twin Zenith carburettors from the Series II remained but were mounted on a new water heated inlet manifold. The result of these changes was a power increase of 5 bhp to 78 bhp (58 kW) at 5400 rpm.

Gearbox changes included higher second, third and top gear ratios, and a reduced angle of gear lever movement to make for shorter lever travel and snappier changes. New front disc brakes significantly improved the Rapier's braking capability and widened its front track to give greater stability and improved road-holding.

A saloon with overdrive was tested by British magazine The Motor in 1960 and had a top speed of 91.7 mph (147.6 km/h) and could accelerate from 0-60 mph (97 km/h) in 16.6 seconds. A fuel consumption of 29.5 miles per imperial gallon (9.6 L/100 km; 24.6 mpg_{‑US}) was recorded. The test car cost £1045 including taxes.

The Series III, of which 15,368 units were built (hardtop and convertible) gave way to the Series IIIA in April 1961.

== Series IIIA ==
Sunbeam Rapier IIIA
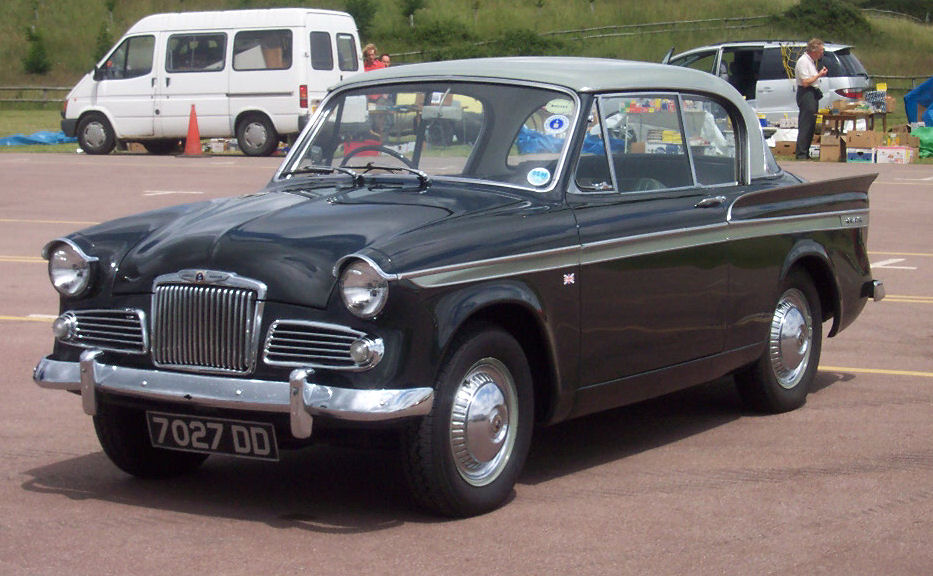

Overview
- Production: 1961–1963; 17,354 produced.

Body and chassis
- Body style: 2-door coupé 2-door convertible

Powertrain
- Engine: 1,592 cc (97.1 cu in) overhead valve Straight-4

In 1961 the Series IIIA was announced with the Series II Sunbeam Alpine 1,592 cc (97.1 cu in) engine.

Externally and internally the Series IIIA was identical to the Series III. The improvements were directed solely at improving the durability of the car. To this end, engine capacity was increased and a stiffer crankshaft fitted. To increase reliability, the crankshaft incorporated larger diameter connecting rod bearings which called for modifications to the connecting rods and gudgeon pins. Modified oil and water pumps completed the engine changes. As a result, power output increased from 78 bhp (58 kW) to 80.25 bhp (60 kW) at 5,100 rpm and torque increased from 84 lb⋅ft (114 N⋅m) at 3500 rpm to 88.2 lb⋅ft (120 N⋅m) at 3,900 rpm.

In addition, the Series IIIA included many detail changes such as an increased diameter front anti-roll bar which greatly improved roadholding, a redesigned clutch bell housing, a revised clutch assembly with nine pressure springs instead of six and a redesigned air cleaner assembly. Inside the car a fresh-air heater, hitherto available only at extra cost, became a standard fitting. All of these changes combined to make the Series IIIA subtly different from its predecessor and to give the Sunbeam Rapier a new lease of life in the showroom.

Maximum speed for the Series IIIA was lower than the Series III at 90 mph (140 km/h). It also took longer than the Series III to get to 60 mph (97 km/h) (19.3 seconds) but its engine was far more durable.

In mid 1963, the Series IIIA convertible was discontinued but the hardtop soldiered on until October 1963 when it was replaced by the Series IV. When production of the Series IIIA ceased, 17,354 units had been built.

== Series IV ==
Sunbeam Rapier IV
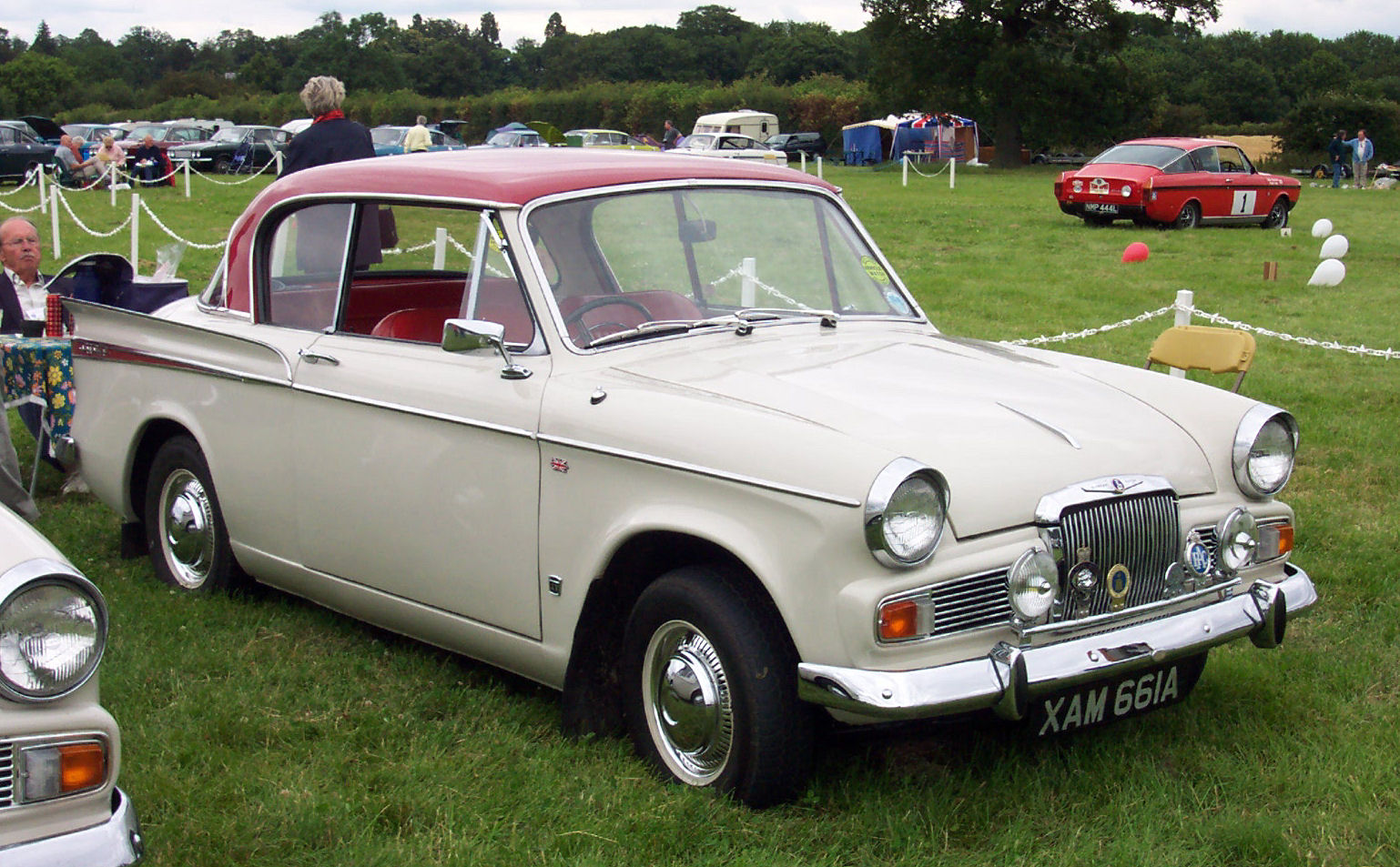

Overview
- Production: 1963–1965; 9,700 produced.

Body and chassis
- Body style: 2 door saloon

Powertrain
- Engine: 1,592 cc (97.1 cu in) overhead valve Straight-4

Late in 1963, Rootes were set to discontinue the Rapier. It was no longer the mainstay of the competitions department because Rootes had directed its motor sport effort towards the Hillman Imp and the Sunbeam Tiger. In fact a totally new Series IV Rapier had been designed, prototypes built and testing completed, and then the Rootes Group changed its focus. The proposed 'Series IV' became the Mark I Humber Sceptre and the old Series IIIA Rapier was redesigned, hopefully to give it a new lease of life as a touring saloon rather than a sports coupé.

The most obvious difference was the change to 13-inch (330 mm) road wheels in common with the rest of Rootes' light car range. This meant that the stainless steel wheel trims of earlier Rapiers were replaced by Rootes corporate hub caps and rim finishers. At the front, the car was redesigned to make it look more up-to-date. A new bonnet made the front look lower and flatter and the front wings were modified to accept extensions housing alloy side grilles and sidelights with amber turn indicators. The traditional Sunbeam grille, already stylised for the Series II, was further modified to give a lower, more square shape with a pronounced convex profile. New headlamp rims were fitted, in fact Sunbeam Alpine items but chromed for the Rapier, and a new front bumper using the same shape and profile as the rest of the Light Car range. At the back, a new full width number plate plinth appeared with a new Light Car range bumper. To give a more open look from the side, the frames were removed from the side windows. Finally, small badges fitted at the bottom of each front wing and on the boot lid proclaimed each car to be a "Series IV".

Inside, a new dash, still in walnut veneer, but with the glove box raised into the dash itself allowed the inclusion of a proper storage shelf on each side of the car. Instrumentation and controls were much as before except that the heater switches and ashtray were now housed in a console in front of the gear lever. To aid driver comfort, an adjustable steering column was fitted along with new front seats which allowed more fore and aft adjustment and for the first time, included backrest adjustment.

In common with the rest of the light car range, the Rapier's front suspension was re-engineered to replace the half king pin on each side of the car with a sealed for life ball joint. All other suspension joints became either sealed for life or were rubber bushed thereby eliminating every grease point on the car. Gearing was adjusted overall to compensate for the smaller wheels and the front brake discs were reduced in size so that they would fit inside the wheels. A brake servo became standard and the spring and damper settings were adjusted to give a softer ride. A new diaphragm clutch and new clutch master cylinder brought lighter and more progressive clutch operation.

The 1,592 cc (97.1 cu in) engine from the Series IIIA was unchanged but the twin Zenith carburettors finally gave way to a single twin-choke Solex 32PAIA in the interests of serviceability. The effect of the new carburettor was to increase power to 84 bhp (63 kW; 85 PS) and torque to 91 lb⋅ft (123 N⋅m) at 3,500 rpm.

In October 1964, along with the rest of the light car range, the Series IV received the new Rootes all synchromesh gearbox, a change which coincided with the introduction of a new computerised chassis numbering system.

The Motor road test of April 1964 gave the Series IV Rapier's maximum speed as 91 mph (146 km/h) and its 0-60 mph (97 km/h) time as 17 seconds.

When production of the Series IV ceased in 1965, 9700 units had been built.

== Series V ==
Sunbeam Rapier V
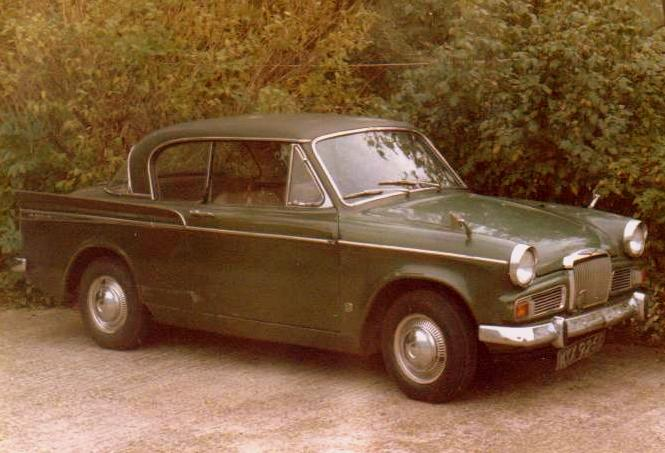
- Rapier Series V 1966

Overview
- Production: 1965–1967; 3,759 produced.

Body and chassis
- Body style: 2 door saloon

Powertrain
- Engine: 1,725 cc OHV I4

Pending completion of the new Fastback Rapier, Rootes released one more update of the Sunbeam Rapier. In September 1965 they introduced the Series V version which looked exactly like the Series IV inside and out except for badges on wings and boot which now said "1725", revealing a re-developed engine.

Rootes redesigned the Rapier's four-cylinder engine to increase the capacity, with a new five main bearing crankshaft, making the unit stronger and smoother. This engine would be developed for many subsequent models. In the Series V Rapier the engine developed 91 hp (68 kW) at 5,500 rpm.

To further update the car, they changed its polarity from positive to negative earth and fitted an alternator in place of the dynamo. They also devised a new twin pipe exhaust system so that the new engine could breathe more easily.

The effect of these changes was to increase the Rapier's maximum speed to 95 mph (153 km/h) and reduce its time from rest to 60 mph (97 km/h) to 14.1 seconds. However, for all its improvements, the Series V just did not sell. By the time it was discontinued in June 1967, only 3,759 units had been built, making it the rarest of all the "Series" Sunbeam Rapiers.

== Sunbeam Rapier Fastback coupé ==
Sunbeam Rapier Fastback
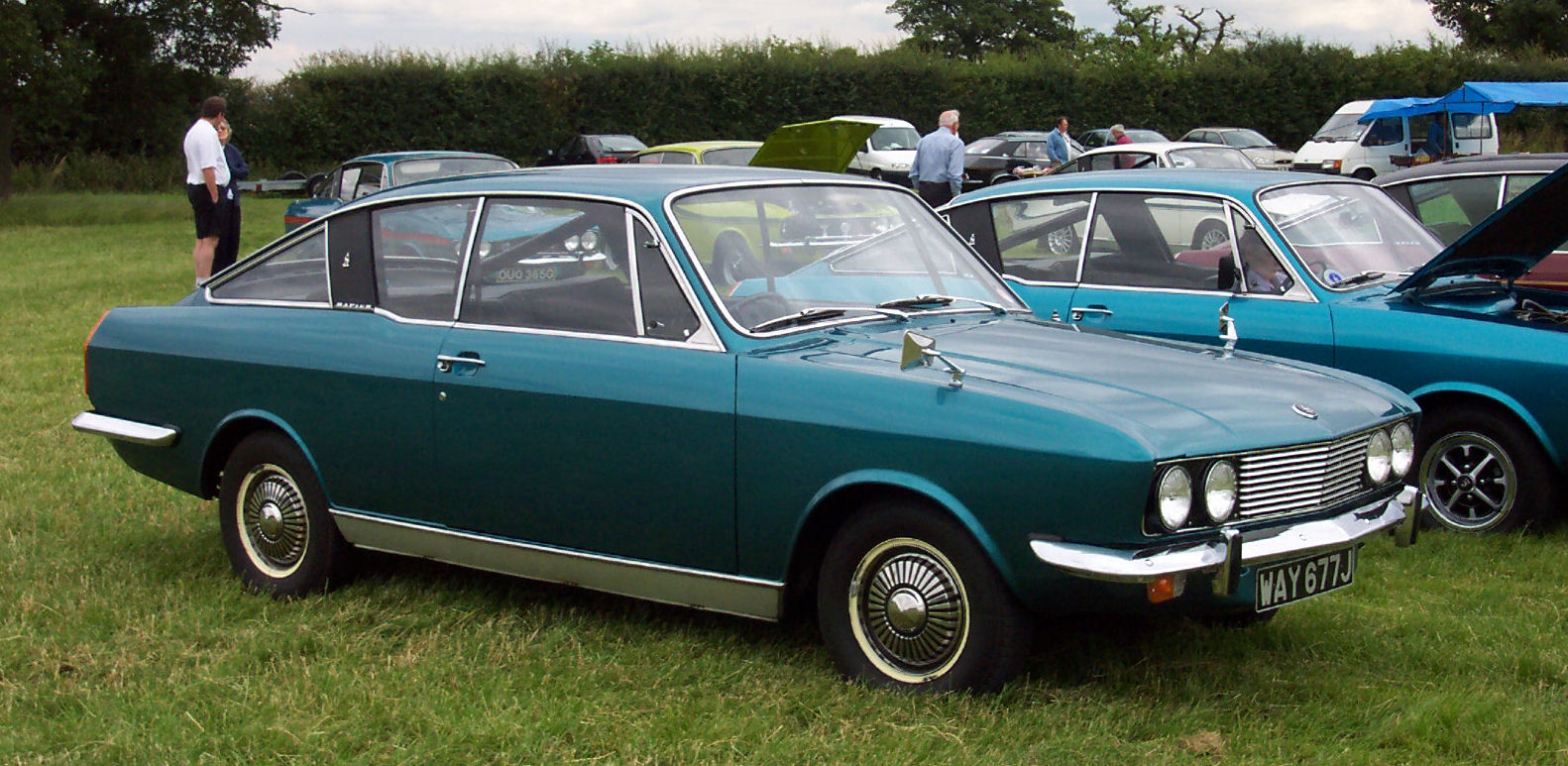

Overview
- Also called: Sunbeam Alpine GT (United States)
- Production: 1967–1976; 46,204 produced including Alpine and H120.
- Designer: Roy Axe

Body and chassis
- Body style: 2 door fastback coupe
- Related: Rootes Arrow range

Powertrain
- Engine: 1,725 cc OHV I4

Dimensions
- Wheelbase: 98.5 in (2,500 mm)
- Length: 174 in (4,400 mm)
- Width: 64.75 in (1,645 mm)
- Height: 55 in (1,400 mm)

By 1967 Rootes' "Arrow" range was ready. As well as the Hillman Hunter, the range also included a new generation of Sunbeam Rapiers, with fastback coupé bodies and a sporty image. Like the earlier Series I to Series V models, it was a two-door pillarless hardtop.

The Arrow Rapier – or Fastback, as it came to be known – launched in October 1967, was a four-seat coupé based on the chassis of the Hillman Hunter Estate. Although the Rapier used the tail lamps from the Hunter Estate and rear valance from the Hunter Saloon, the rest of its superstructure was unique.

The Rapier used the Rootes four-cylinder, five-bearing 1,725 cc (105.3 cu in) engine, which was tilted slightly to the right to enable a lower bonnet line, in common with the other Arrow models. With its twin Stromberg 150CD carburettors the engine produced 88 hp (66 kW; 89 PS) at 5200 rpm. Overdrive was standard with the manual gearbox, and Borg-Warner automatic transmission was an optional extra.

The Fastback Rapier continued almost unchanged until 1976, when it was discontinued without a replacement. During its lifetime it formed the basis for the more powerful Sunbeam Rapier H120, introduced in October 1968 and identifiable by its boot-lid spoiler and black front grille: it shared its Holbay Engineering-tuned 110 hp (82 kW; 112 PS) engine (with twin Weber carburettors) with the Hillman Hunter GLS. The Rapier was also the basis for the slightly cheaper but similarly bodied, single-carburettor Sunbeam Alpine Fastback introduced in October 1969. Rapier running gear (though not the estate chassis) was also used in the Humber Sceptre MkIII, Hillman GT and Hillman Hunter GT models from the Arrow range.

Between 1967 and 1969, the Rapier was built at Ryton-on-Dunsmore, but from 1969 until its demise in 1976, it was built at Rootes' Hillman Imp factory at Linwood in Scotland. In all, 46,204 units were built (including Rapier, H120 and Alpine versions).

Maximum speed of the Rapier was 103 mph (166 km/h) and it could reach 60 mph (97 km/h) from rest in 12.8 seconds.

In the United States, the Rapier was marketed as the Sunbeam Alpine GT.

=== Sunbeam Alpine Fastback coupé ===
Sunbeam Alpine Fastback Coupé
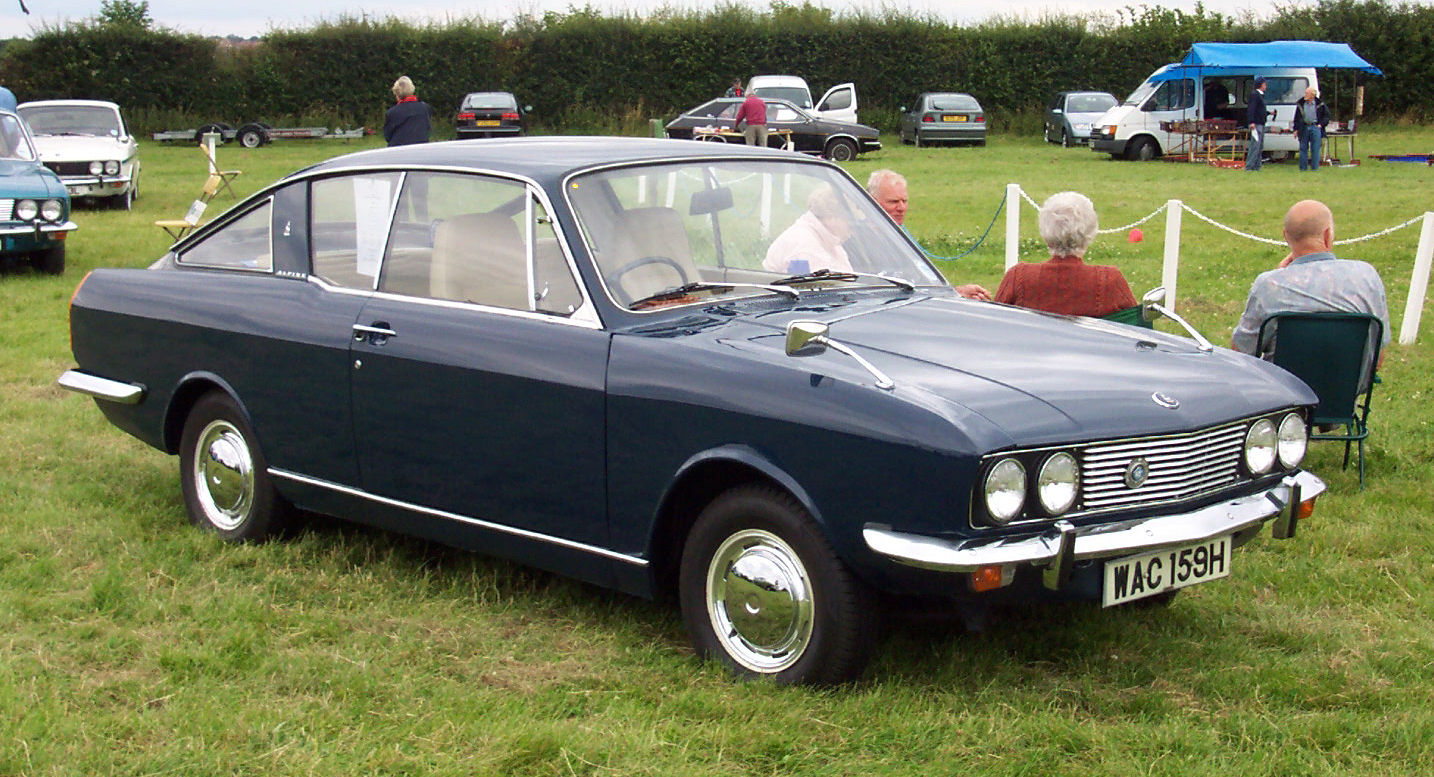
- Sunbeam Alpine Fastback coupé

Overview
- Production: 1970–1975

Body and chassis
- Body style: 2-door fastback coupe

Powertrain
- Engine: 1,725 cc OHV I4

The Sunbeam Alpine Fastback, introduced in October 1969, was essentially a Rapier with a simplified specification, developed to fill a gap in the Arrow range above the Singer Vogue. It used the same 1,725 cc (105.3 cu in) engine as the Hillman Hunter which, fitted with a single Stromberg 150CD carburettor, developed 74 hp (55 kW) at 5500 rpm. Transmission options included overdrive on cars with a manual gearbox or a Borg-Warner automatic transmission.

The Alpine, though well equipped, was less sporty in style than the Rapier. It had a wooden dashboard with fewer instruments, instead of the Rapier's cowled plastic one, and wood instead of metal on the transmission tunnel. There were also different wheel trims, no aluminium sill finishers (nor the polished ones of the H120) and no vinyl trim on its C-pillars. Above all at £1086 in the UK it was significantly (for the time) cheaper than the £1200 Rapier.

Maximum speed of the Alpine was 91 mph (146 km/h) and it could reach 60 mph (97 km/h) from rest in 14.6 seconds.

The Fastback Alpine was discontinued in 1975, before the Rapier and H120.

=== Sunbeam Rapier H120 ===
Sunbeam Rapier H120
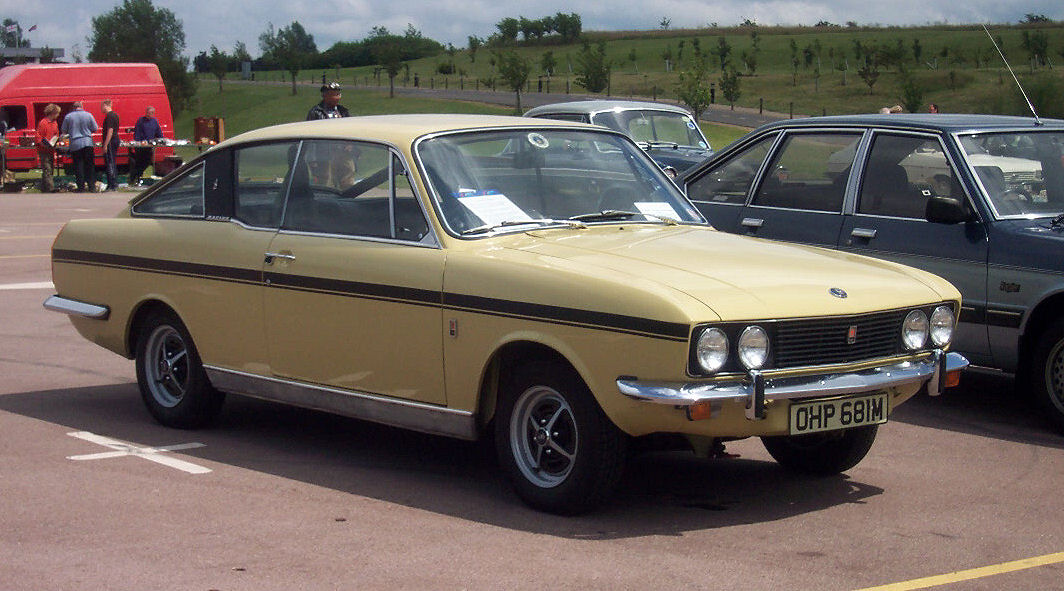
- Sunbeam Rapier H120 Fastback coupé

Overview
- Production: 1968–1976

Body and chassis
- Body style: 2-door fastback coupe

Powertrain
- Engine: 1,725 cc OHV I4

To produce a faster version of the Fastback Rapier, Rootes developed the H120. Based on the Rapier, the H120 had a more powerful version of the 1,725 cc (105.3 cu in) engine specially developed by Holbay Engineering. It produced 108 hp (81 kW) (gross) at 5,200 rpm ,163nm at 4000rpm and was fitted with a special cylinder head, high lift camshaft, tuned length four-branch exhaust manifold, special distributor and twin Weber 40DCOE carburetters. The H120 had a close ratio gearbox, a heavy duty overdrive, and a high ratio rear axle.

To add to its sporty image, the H120 had wider Rostyle wheels, broad side flashes, polished sill covers, a matt black radiator grille and a new boot lid incorporating a faired-in spoiler. To further distinguish the model from others in the range, it had H120 badges on the front wings and in the centre of the grille.

Maximum speed of the H120 was 106 mph (171 km/h) and it could reach 60 mph (97 km/h) from standstill in 11.1 seconds.

The H120 was discontinued with the Fastback Rapier in 1976.

== Scale models ==
- Meccano Dinky Toys; No. 166 (production 1958–1963), Series I Rapier, approximately O scale (1:44).
- Oxford Die Cast; No. 76SR002 (production unknown), Series III Rapier, 1:76 scale.
- Silas Models; No. SM433044C (production unknown), Series IIIa Rapier Convertible, 1:43 scale.
