= 1968 London–Sydney Marathon =

Rally race

1968 London-Sydney Marathon Daily Express-Daily Telegraph London-Sydney Marathon
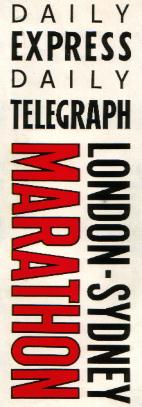
- Host country: United Kingdom; Australia
- Rally base: London; Sydney
- Dates run: 24 November – 17 December 1968
- Stages: 31
- Stage surface: Tarmac and Gravel
- Overall distance: 16,694 km (10,373 miles)

Statistics
- Crews: 98 at start, 56 at finish

Overall results
- Overall winner: (United Kingdom) Andrew Cowan (United Kingdom) Colin Malkin (United Kingdom) Brian Coyle (United Kingdom) Rootes Group

The 1968 London–Sydney Marathon, officially Daily Express-Daily Telegraph London-Sydney Marathon was the first running of the London-Sydney Marathon. The rally took place between the 24 November and 17 December 1968. The event covered 10,373 miles (16,694 km) through Europe, Middle East, Asia and Australia. It was won by Andrew Cowan, Colin Malkin and Brian Coyle, driving a Hillman Hunter.

== Background ==
The original Marathon was the result of a lunch in late 1967, during a period of despondency in Britain caused by the devaluation of the British pound. Sir Max Aitken, proprietor of the Daily Express, and two of his editorial executives, Jocelyn Stevens and Tommy Sopwith, decided to create an event which their newspaper could sponsor, and which would serve to raise the country's spirits. Such an event would, it was felt, act as a showcase for British engineering and would boost export sales in the countries through which it passed.

The initial UK£10,000 winner's prize offered by the Daily Express was soon joined by a £3,000 runners-up award and two £2,000 prizes for the third-placed team and for the highest-placed Australians, all of which were underwritten by the Daily Telegraph newspaper and its proprietor Frank Packer, who was eager to promote the Antipodean leg of the rally.

== The route ==
An eight-man organising committee was established to create a suitably challenging but navigable route. Jack Sears, organising secretary and himself a former racing driver, plotted a 7,000-mile course covering eleven countries in as many days, and arranged that the P&O liner Chusan would ferry the first 72 cars and their crews on the nine-day voyage from India, before the final 2,900 miles across Australia:

Europe and Asia
Leg	Date	Start	Finish	Allowed time	Description
1	24–25 November	London	Paris	12h 32m	2300hrs depart Crystal Palace, London; 0400hrs depart England at Port of Dover on the cross-English Channel ferry to France; 1132hrs arrive Le Bourget Airport, Paris
2	25–26 November	Paris	Turin	13h 32m	To Italy via the Mont Blanc Tunnel; 0052hrs arrive Turin
3	26 November	Turin	Belgrade	21h 12m	Autostrada towards Venice before crossing into Yugoslavia; 2204hrs arrive Belgrade
4	26–27 November	Belgrade	Istanbul	15h 31m	Through Bulgaria by night into Turkey; 1335hrs arrive Istanbul
5	27–28 November	Istanbul	Sivas	12h 25m	Crossing the Bosphorus by ferry, through Ankara and the Bolu Pass; 0300hrs arrive Sivas
6	28 November	Sivas	Erzincan	2h 45m	Heading east across unsurfaced roads; 0445hrs Erzincan
7	28–29 November	Erzincan	Tehran	22h 01m	Cross border into Iran; 0246hrs arrive Tehran
8	29–30 November	Tehran	Kabul	23h 33m	Follow one of two routes to Islam Qala in Afghanistan, either the northerly route across the Alburz Mountains skirting the southern shores of the Caspian Sea, or the shorter but more treacherous route along the north edge of the Great Salt Desert; 0219hrs arrive Kabul, where timeous crews can enjoy a 6.5 hour rest before the Khyber Pass opens.
9	30 November	Kabul	Sarobi	1h 00m	0842hrs depart Kabul across an obsolete, loose-surfaced road through the Lataband Pass; 0942hrs arrive Sarobi
10	30 November – 1 December	Sarobi	Delhi	17h 55m	Cross Pakistan in a day into India; 0337hrs arrive Delhi
11	1–2 December	Delhi	Bombay	22h 51m	Pass through Agra and Indore; 0228hrs arrive Bombay

The remaining crews departed Bombay at 3 am on Thursday 5 December, arriving in Fremantle at 10 am on Friday 13 December before they restarted in Perth the following evening. Any repairs attempted on the car during the voyage would lead to the crew's exclusion.

Australia
Leg	Date	Start	Finish	Allowed time	Description
12	14–15 December	Perth	Youanmi	7h 00m	Depart 1800hrs from Gloucester Park, traversing smooth but unsurfaced road; 0100hrs arrive deserted mining town of Youanmi
13	15 December	Youanmi	Marvel Loch	4h 03m	Through semi-desert via Diemal to asphalt road at Bullfinch; 0503hrs arrive Marvel Loch.
14	15 December	Marvel Loch	Lake King	1h 59m	Into the Nullarbor Plain; 0702hrs arrive Lake King
15	15 December	Lake King	Ceduna	14h 52m	2154hrs arrive Ceduna
16	15–16 December	Ceduna	Quorn	6h 18m	0412hrs arrive Quorn
17	16 December	Quorn	Moralana Creek	1h 17m	0529hrs arrive Moralana Creek
18	16 December	Moralana Creek	Brachina	1h 30m	0659hrs arrive Brachina
19	16 December	Brachina	Mingary	4h 10m	1109hrs arrive Mingary
20	16 December	Mingary	Menindee	2h 12m	1329hrs arrive Menindee
21	16 December	Menindee	Gunbar	5h 18m	1839hrs arrive Gunbar
22	16 December	Gunbar	Edi	4h 26m	2305hrs arrive Edi
23	16–17 December	Edi	Brookside	1h 00m	0005hrs arrive Brookside
24	17 December	Brookside	Omeo	1h 55m	0200hrs arrive Omeo
25	17 December	Omeo	Murrindal	2h 06m	0406hrs arrive Murrindal
26	17 December	Murrindal	Ingebyra	1h 31m	0537hrs arrive Ingebyra
27	17 December	Ingebyra	Numeralla	1h 29m	0706hrs arrive Numeralla
28	17 December	Numeralla	Hindmarsh Station	0h 42m	0748hrs arrive Hindmarsh Station
29	17 December	Hindmarsh Station	Nowra	2h 01m	0949hrs arrive Nowra
30	17 December	Nowra	Warwick Farm Racecourse	3h 30m	1319hrs arrive Warwick Farm Racecourse
31	18 December	Warwick Farm Racecourse	Sydney		Arrive in procession, Sydney

== Rally summary ==
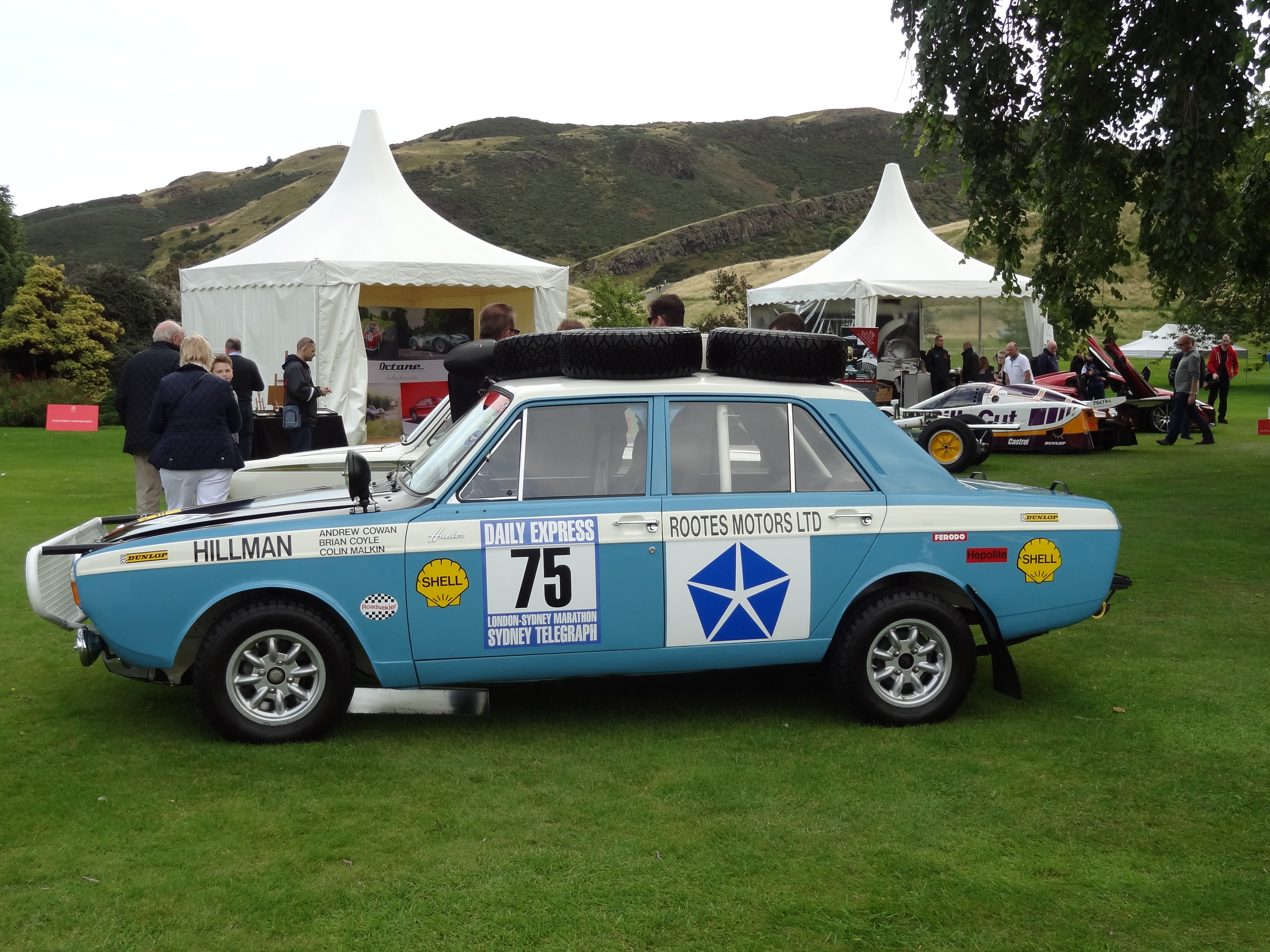
The winning Hillman Hunter which was crewed by Andrew Cowan, Colin Malkin and Brian Coyle

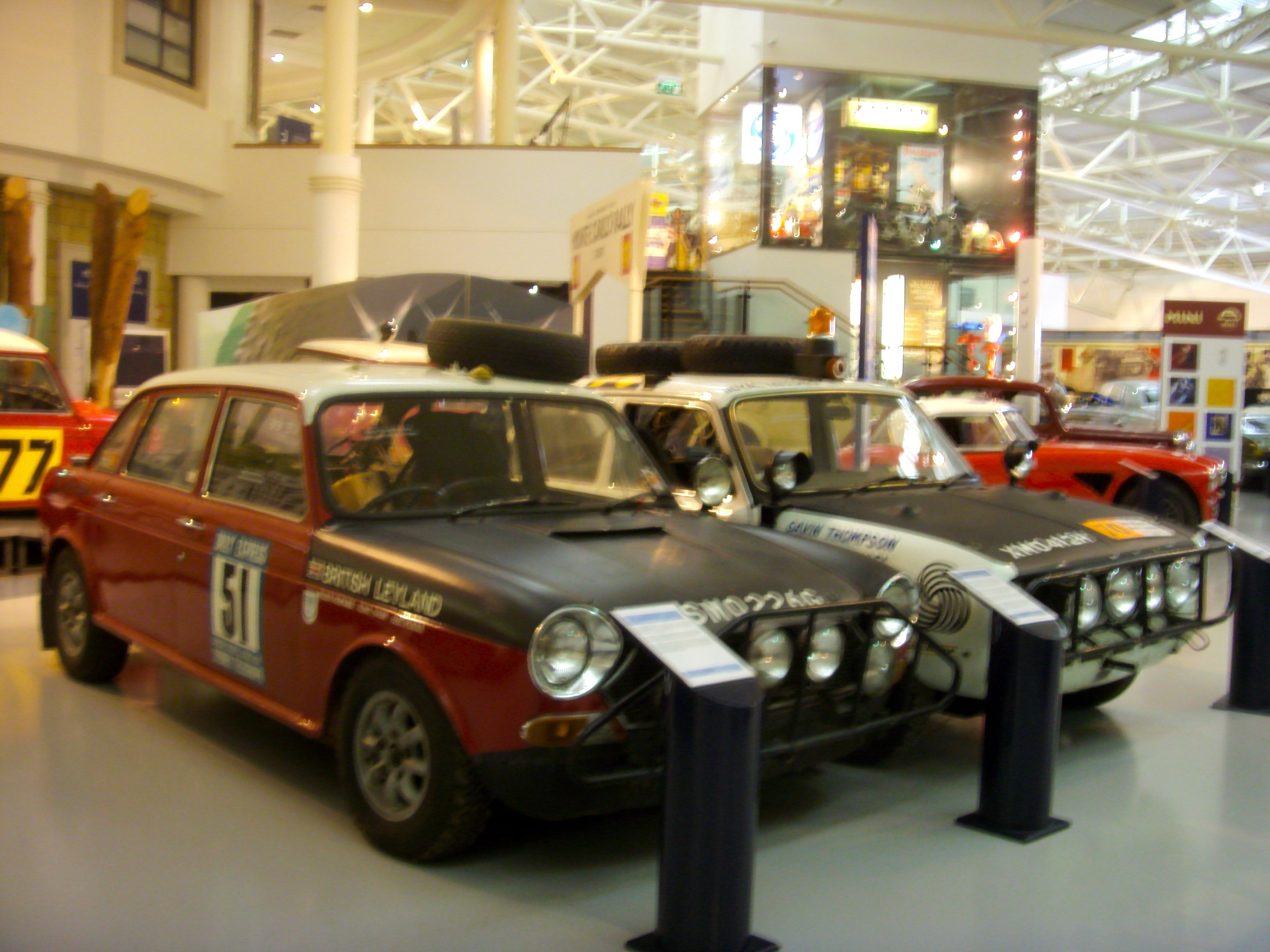
1968 Austin 1800 London-Sydney Marathon Car - Second Place #51 driven by Paddy Hopkirk with 1970 Austin Maxi from 1970 London to Mexico World Cup Rally

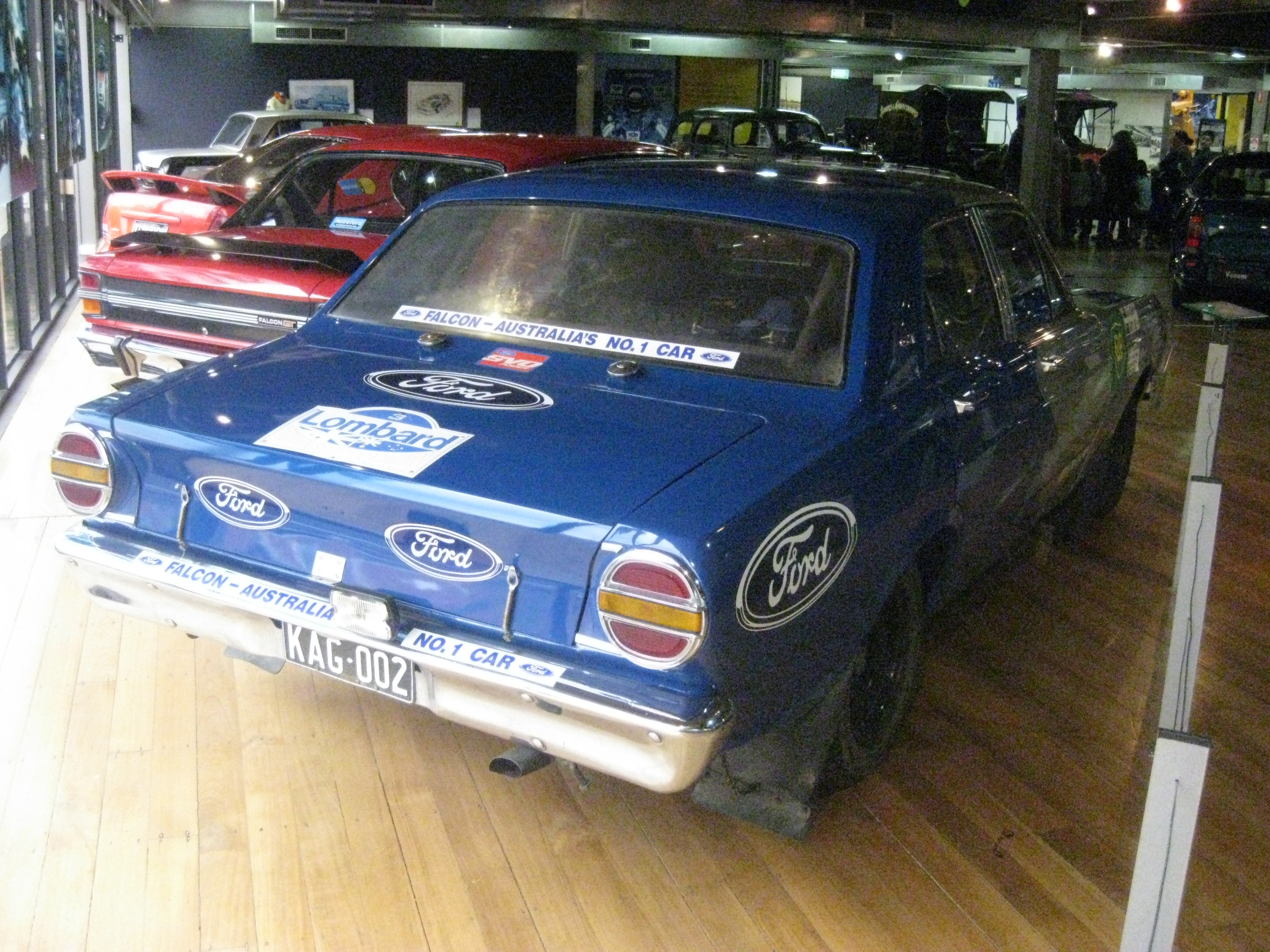
The Ford XT Falcon GT (Australian model) which placed 3rd in the 1968 Marathon

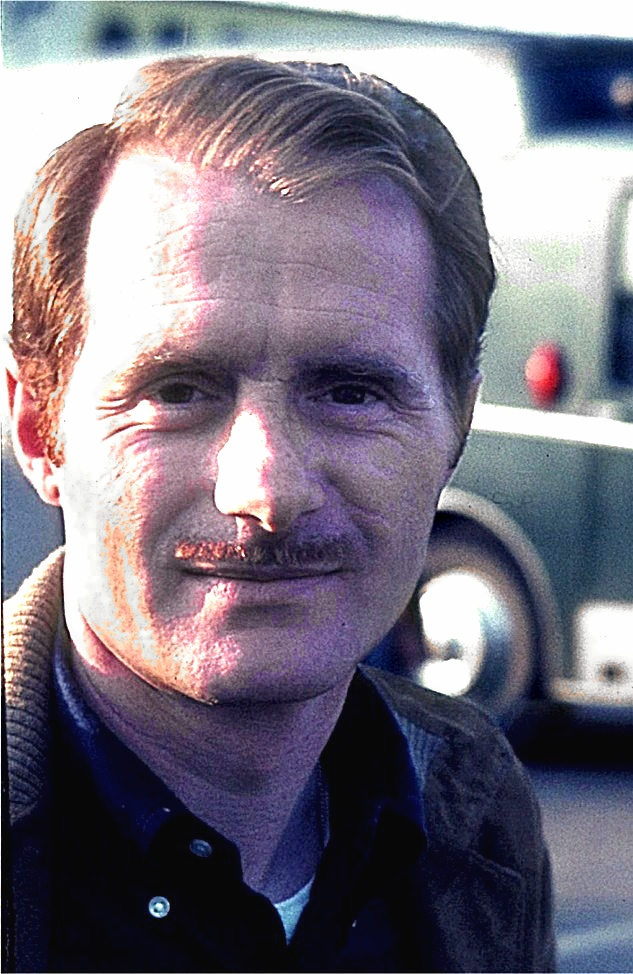
Lucien Bianchi - winner of 1968 24 Hours of Le Mans and leader of the Marathon until Nowra

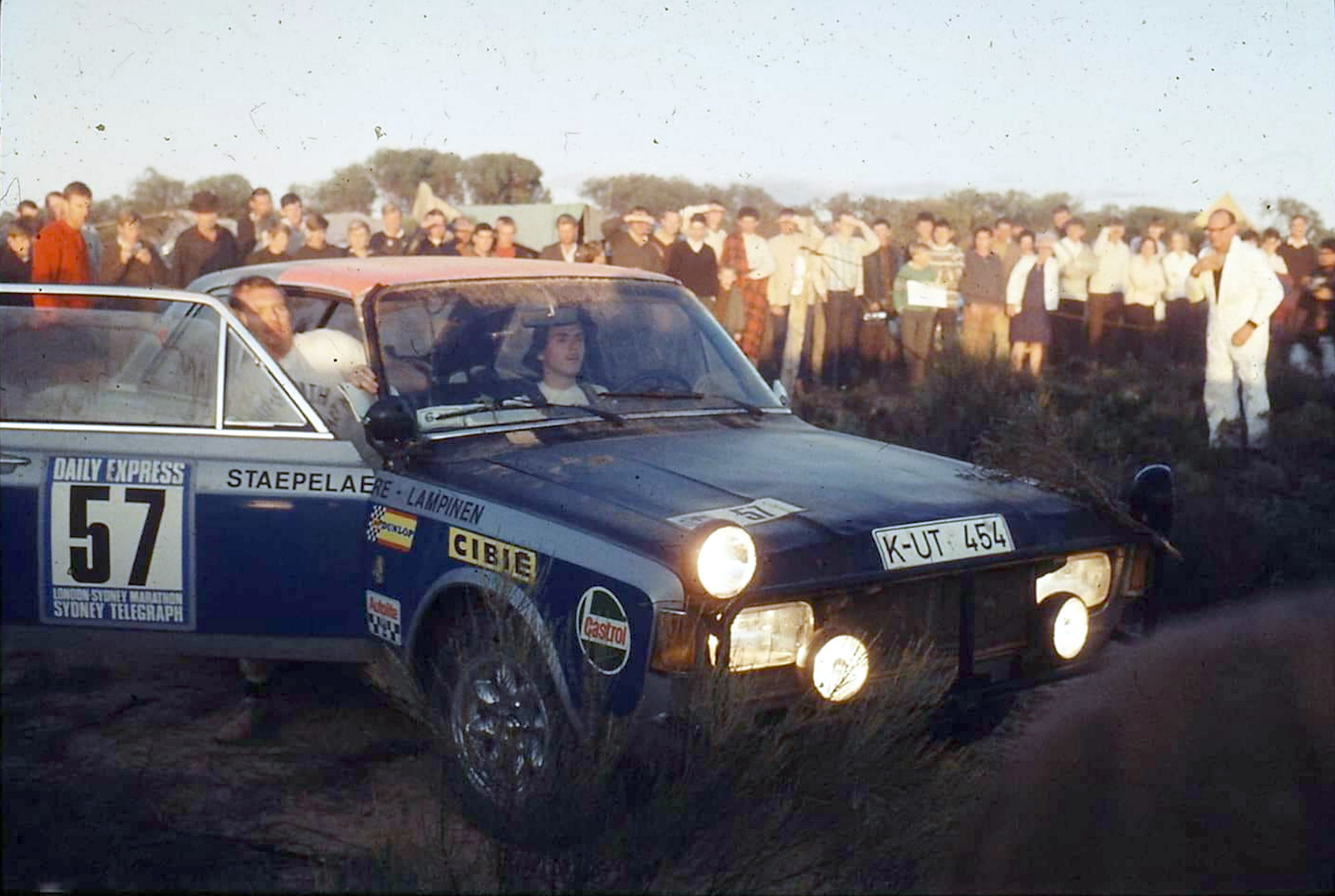
The Ford Taunus 20m RS of Gilbert Staepelaere and Simo Lampinen placed 16th.

Roger Clark established an early lead through the first genuinely treacherous leg, from Sivas to Erzincan in Turkey, averaging almost 60 mph in his Lotus Cortina for the 170-mile stage. Despite losing time in Pakistan and India, he maintained his lead to the end of the Asian section in Bombay, with Simo Lampinen's Ford Taunus second and Lucien Bianchi's Citroën DS in third.

However, once into Australia, Clark suffered several setbacks. A piston failure dropped him to third, and would have cost him a finish had he not been able to cannibalise fellow Ford driver Eric Jackson's car for parts. After repairs were effected, he suffered what should have been a terminal rear differential failure. Encountering a Cortina by the roadside, he persuaded the initially reluctant owner to sell his rear axle and resumed once more, although at the cost of 80 minutes' delay while it was replaced.

This left Lucien Bianchi and co-driver Jean-Claude Ogier in the Citroën DS in the lead ahead of Gilbert Staepelaere/Simo Lampinen in the German Ford Taunus, with Andrew Cowan in the Hillman Hunter 3rd. Then Staepelaere's Taunus hit a gate post, breaking a track rod. This left Cowan in second position and Paddy Hopkirk's Austin 1800 in third place.

Approaching the Nowra checkpoint at the end of the penultimate stage with only 98 miles (158 km) to Sydney, the leading Frenchmen were involved in a head-on collision with a motorist who mistakenly entered a closed course, wrecking their Citroën DS and hospitalising the pair.

Hopkirk, the first driver on the scene (ahead of Cowan on the road, but behind on penalties) stopped to tend to the injured and extinguish the flames in the burning cars. Andrew Cowan, next on the scene, also slowed but was waved through with the message that everything was under control. Hopkirk rejoined the rally, and neither he nor Cowan lost penalties in this stage. So Andrew Cowan, who had requested "a car to come last" from the Chrysler factory on the assumption that only half a dozen drivers would even reach Sydney, took victory in his Hillman Hunter and claimed the £10,000 prize. Hopkirk finished second, while Australian Ian Vaughan was third in a factory-entered Ford XT Falcon GT. Ford Australia won the Teams' Prize with their three Falcons GTs, placing 3rd, 6th and 8th.

== Results ==
Pos	No	Entrant	Drivers	Car	Penalties (Points)
1	75	(United Kingdom) Rootes Motors Group	(United Kingdom) Andrew Cowan (United Kingdom) Colin Malkin (United Kingdom) Brian Coyle	Hillman Hunter	50
2	51	(United Kingdom) British Leyland	(United Kingdom) Paddy Hopkirk (United Kingdom) Tony Nash (Republic of Ireland) Alec Poole	BMC Austin 1800	56
3	24	Ford Australia	(Australia) Ian Vaughan (Australia) Robert Forsyth (Australia) Jack Ellis	Ford Falcon XT GT	62
4	58	(Poland) Sobiesław Zasada	(Poland) Sobiesław Zasada (Poland) Marek Wachowski	Porsche 911S	63
5	61	(United Kingdom) British Leyland	(Finland) Rauno Aaltonen (United Kingdom) Henry Liddon (United Kingdom) Paul Easter	BMC Austin 1800	68
6	29	Ford Australia	(Australia) Bruce Hodgson (Australia) Doug Rutherford	Ford Falcon XT GT	70
7	92	(Germany) Ford Werke Deutschland	(Germany) Herbert Kleint (Germany) Günther Klapproth	Ford Taunus 20M RS	91
8	2	Ford Australia	(Australia) Harry Firth (Australia) Graham Hoinville (Australia) Gary Chapman	Ford Falcon XT GT	114
9	74	(France) Citroën Cars	(France) Robert Neyret (France) Jacques Terramorsi	Citroën DS 21	123
10	48	(United Kingdom) Ford Motor Company	(United Kingdom) Roger Clark (Sweden) Ove Andersson	Ford Cortina Lotus Mark II	144
11	12	(Australia) TVW-7, Daily News, Perth	(Australia) Ken Tubman (Australia) Jack Forrest	Volvo 144S	146
12	76	(Australia) Daily Telegraph-Holden Dealer Rally Team	(Australia) Barry Ferguson (Australia) Doug Chivas (Australia) Dave Johnson	Holden Monaro HK GTS 327	169
13	43	(Australia) Amoco	(Australia) Andre Welinski (Australia) Gerry Lister	Volvo 144S	171
14	68	(Australia) Sydney Telegraph-Holden Dealer Rally Team	(Australia) Doug Whiteford (Australia) Eddie Perkins (Australia) Jim Hawker	Holden Monaro HK GTS 327	173
15	55	(Kenya) E.G. Herrmann	(Kenya) Edgar Herrmann (Germany) Hans Schüller	Porsche 911T	195
16	57	(Germany) Ford Werke Deutschland AG	(Belgium) Gilbert Staepelaere (Finland) Simo Lampinen	Ford Taunus 20M RS	206
17	30	(Netherlands) Dutch National Team	(Netherlands) Rob Slotemaker (Netherlands) Rob Janssen	DAF 55	208
18	32	(United Kingdom) Captain F. Barker	(United Kingdom) Capt. Fred Barker (United Kingdom) Capt. David Dollar (United Kingdom) Capt. John Lewis	Mercedes-Benz 280S	264
19	64	(United Kingdom) Red Arrows-Evan Cook	(United Kingdom) Flight Lt. Terry Kingsley (United Kingdom) Flight Lt. Derek Bell (United Kingdom) Flight Lt. Peter Evans	BMC Austin 1800	266
20	19	(Soviet Union) Avtoexport	(Soviet Union) Sergei Tenishev (Soviet Union) Valentin Kislyh	Moskvitch 412	269
21	31	BMC Australia	(Australia) Evan Green (Australia) Jack 'Gelignite' Murray (Australia) George Shepheard	BMC Austin 1800	332
22	98	(Soviet Union) Avtoexport	(Soviet Union) Uno Aava (Soviet Union) Jurij Lesovski	Moskvitch 408	358
23	1	(United Kingdom) RTS Motorway Remoulds	(United Kingdom) Bill Bengry (United Kingdom) Arthur Brick (United Kingdom) John Preddy	Ford Cortina GT Mark II	360
24	4	(United Kingdom) British Leyland	(United Kingdom) Tony Fall (United Kingdom) Mike Wood (United Kingdom) Brian Culcheth	BMC Austin 1800	430
25	56	(United Kingdom) A.J. Percy	(United Kingdom) Alister Percy (United Kingdom) Jeremy Delmar-Morgan	Saab 95 V4 Estate	438
26	62	(Australia) Desmond Praznovsky	(Australia) Desmond Praznovsky (Australia) Stan Zovko (Australia) Ian Inglis	Mercedes-Benz 200D	455
27	83	(Republic of Ireland) Kentredder	(Republic of Ireland) John Cotton (Republic of Ireland) Sylvia Kay (Republic of Ireland) Paddy McClintock	Peugeot 404	470
28	71	(United Kingdom) Vantona Eyeware	(United Kingdom) Brian Field (United Kingdom) Des Tilley (United Kingdom) David Jones	BMC Austin 1800	570
29	72	(United Kingdom) Ernie McMillen	(United Kingdom) Ernie McMillen (United Kingdom) John L'Amie (United Kingdom) Ian Drysdale	Ford Cortina Lotus Mark II	587
30	90	(United Kingdom) British Army Motoring Association-Ford Motor Co.	(United Kingdom) Capt. David Harrison (United Kingdom) Lt. Martin Proudlock	Ford Cortina Lotus Mark II	623
31	17	(United Kingdom) Royal Navy	(United Kingdom) Capt. James Hans Hamilton (United Kingdom) Capt. Ian Lees-Spalding (United Kingdom) Cmdr. Philip Stearns	BMC Austin 1800	656
32	45	(United Kingdom) RAF Motorsport Association-Rootes Motors	(United Kingdom) Flight Lt. David Carrington (United Kingdom) Squadron Ldr. Anthony King (United Kingdom) Flight Lt. John Jones	Hillman Hunter	715
33	7	(Soviet Union) Avtoexport	(Soviet Union) Alexander Ipatenko (Soviet Union) Alexander Terehin (Soviet Union) Eduard Bazhenov	Moskvitch 408	776
34	70	(United Kingdom) Wilson's Motor Caravan Centre	(United Kingdom) Anthony Wilson (United Kingdom) Francis McDonnell (United Kingdom) Colin Taylor	BMC Austin 1800	816
35	60	(United Kingdom) Terry-Thomas Team	(United Kingdom) Peter Capelin (United Kingdom) Antony Pargeter (United Kingdom) Tim Baker	Ford Cortina 1600E Mark II	873
36	77	(United Kingdom) Big 'N' Cash & Carry Group	(United Kingdom) Robert Eaves (United Kingdom) John Vipond (United Kingdom) Frank Bainbridge	BMC Austin 1800	873
37	54	(United Kingdom) British Army Motoring Association	(United Kingdom) Maj. John Hemsley (United Kingdom) WO1 Frank Webber	Rover 2000 TC	894
38	20	(Soviet Union) Avtoexport	(Soviet Union) Victor Schavelev (Soviet Union) Emmanuil 'Misha' Lifshits (Soviet Union) Valerij Shirotchenkov	Moskvitch 408	942
39	18	(United Kingdom) M.A. Colvill	(United Kingdom) Mike Greenwood (United Kingdom) Dave Aldridge	Ford Cortina Mark I	1,075
40	46	(France) Simca Motors	(France) Bernard Heu (France) Jean-Claude Syda	Simca 1100	1,658
41	33	(United Kingdom) Miss Elsie Gadd	(United Kingdom) Elsie Gadd (United Kingdom) Jenny Tudor-Owen (United Kingdom) Sheila Kemp (United Kingdom) Anthea Castell	Volvo 145S Estate	2,399
42	47	(United Kingdom) Nova Magazine	(United Kingdom) Jean Denton (United Kingdom) Tom Boyce	MG MGB	2,408
43	11	(Switzerland) Blick Racing Team	(Switzerland) Fritz Reust (Switzerland) P. Grazter (Switzerland) Axel Béguin	Renault 16 TS	2,491
44	44	(United Kingdom) British Army Motoring Association	(United Kingdom) Maj. Mike Bailey (United Kingdom) Maj. Freddie Preston	Rover 2000 TC	2,848
45	78	(United Kingdom) Supersport Engines	(United Kingdom) Jim Gavin (United Kingdom) John Maclay (United Kingdom) Martin Maudling	Ford Escort GT	3,665
46	53	(United States) S.H. Dickson	(United States) Sidney Dickson (United States) John Saladin (United States) Jerry Sims	Rambler American	3,746
47	42	(United Kingdom) P.G. Graham	(United Kingdom) Peter Graham (United Kingdom) Leslie Morrish (United Kingdom) Michael Wooley	Ford Cortina Savage V6	5,925
48	93	(Republic of Ireland) Henry Ford and Son	(Republic of Ireland) Rosemary Smith (France) Lucette Pointet	Ford Cortina Lotus Mark II	6,139
49	99	(United Kingdom) 17th/21st Lancers	(United Kingdom) Lt. Gavin Thompson (United Kingdom) Lt. Christopher Marriott (United Kingdom) Cpl. Charles Skelton (United Kingdom) Tpr. Melvin Lewis	Land Rover 2WD	6,787
50	41	(Australia) Sydney Telegraph	(Australia) Eileen Westley (Australia) Marion 'Minny' Macdonald (Australia) Jenny Gates	Morris 1100 S	8,111
51	79	(United Kingdom) P.A. Downs	(United Kingdom) Pat Downs (United Kingdom) Anthony Downs	Volkswagen 1200	9,603
52	40	(United Kingdom) Jim Russell Drivers' School	(Australia) David Walker (United Kingdom) Brian Jones (United Kingdom) Doug Morris	Vauxhall Ventora	9,775
53	82	(United Kingdom) D.G. Bray	(United Kingdom) Duncan Bray (United Kingdom) Simon Sladen (United Kingdom) Peter Sugden	Ford Cortina Lotus Mark II	11,465
54	91	(Australia) Maitland Motors	(Australia) Bert Madden (Australia) Jack 'Milko' Murray (Australia) John Bryson	Holden HK Belmont Automatic	11,646
55	8	(Australia) Amoco	(Australia) Max Winkless (Australia) John Keran	Volvo 144S	13,350
56	69	(Netherlands) Dutch National Team	(Netherlands) David van Lennep (Netherlands) Peter Hissink	DAF 55	13,790
DNF	87	(France) Citroën Cars	(Belgium) Lucien Bianchi (France) Jean-Claude Ogier	Citroën DS 21	Retired-TC29 Nowra
DNF	89	(United Kingdom) Longlife Group	(United Kingdom) Robin Clark (United Kingdom) Martin Pearson (United Kingdom) Peter Hall	Ford Cortina Mark II	Retired-TC28 Hindmarsh
DNF	52	(United Kingdom) John Sprinzel	(United Kingdom) John Sprinzel (United Kingdom) Roy Fidler	MG Midget	Retired-TC21 Gunbar
DNF	36	(Australia) Sydney Telegraph-Holden Dealer Rally Team	(Australia) David McKay (Australia) George Reynolds (Australia) David Liddle	Holden Monaro HK GTS 327	Retired-TC20 Menindee
DNF	94	Automobile Club de France-Citroën Cars	(France) Jean-Louis Lemerle (France) Olivier Turcat (France) Patrick Vanson	Citroën DS 21	Retired-TC19 Mingary
DNF	10	(United Kingdom) Royal Green Jackets	(United Kingdom) George Yannaghas (United Kingdom) Lt. Jack Dill	Porsche 911T	Retired-TC19 Mingary
DNF	3	(United Kingdom) Avon-RAF Motorsport Association	(United Kingdom) Flying Officer Nigel Colman (United Kingdom) Flight Lt. Allan Dalgleish (United Kingdom) Flight Lt. Sean Moloney	Ford Cortina GT Mark II	Retired-TC19 Mingary
DNF	95	(Japan) Nobuo Koga	(Japan) Nobuo Koga (Japan) Yojiro Terada (Japan) Kazuhiko Mitsumoto	Vauxhall Viva GT	Retired-TC18 Brachina
DNF	28	(Australia) A.N. Gorshenin	(Australia) Alec Gorshenin (Australia) Ian Bryson	Mercedes-Benz 280SL	Retired-TC18 Brachina
DNF	100	(France) Simca Motors	(France) Pierre Boucher (France) Georges Houel	Simca 1100	Retired-TC17 Moralana
DNF	27	(United Kingdom) Frank Goulden	(United Kingdom) Frank Goulden (United Kingdom) Barry Goulden (United Kingdom) Geoffrey Goulden	Triumph 2000 Mark I	Retired-TC17 Moralana
DNF	73	(United Kingdom) Ford Motor Company	(United Kingdom) Eric Jackson (United Kingdom) Ken Chambers	Ford Cortina Lotus Mark II	Retired-TC16 Quorn
DNF	26	(United Kingdom) M.J.C. Taylor	(United Kingdom) Michael Taylor (United Kingdom) Innes Ireland (United Kingdom) Andrew Hedges	Mercedes-Benz 280SE	Retired-TC16 Quorn
DNF	13	(United Kingdom) J.G. Tallis	(United Kingdom) John Tallis (France) Paul Coltelloni	Volvo 123GT	Retired-TC14 Lake King
DNF	25	(United Kingdom) Chesson Lydden Circuit-La Trobe Brafield Stadium	(United Kingdom) John La Trobe (United Kingdom) William Chesson (United Kingdom) G. Warner	Volvo 122S	Retired-TC14 Lake King
DNF	6	(Australia) Combined Insurance Company of America	(Australia) Clyde Hodgins (Australia) Don Wait (Australia) Brian Lawler	Ford Fairmont XP	Retired-TC14 Lake King
DNF	88	(France) Simca Motors	(France) Roger Masson (France) Jean Py	Simca 1100	Retired-TC11 Bombay
DNF	9	(Switzerland) A.A. Bombelli	(Switzerland) Alfredo 'Freddy' Bombelli (Denmark) Tom Belsø	Ford Cortina Lotus Mark II	Retired-TC11 Bombay
DNF	34	(United Kingdom) Keith Brierley	(United Kingdom) Keith Brierley (United Kingdom) Dave Skittrall	Ford Cortina Lotus Mark II	Retired-TC11 Bombay
DNF	63	(Australia) Amoco	(Australia) Bob Holden (Australia) Laurie Graham	Volvo 142S	Retired-TC10 Delhi
DNF	96	(United Kingdom) Ronald Rogers	(United Kingdom) Ronald Rogers (United Kingdom) Alec Sheppard	Ford Cortina 1600E Mark II	Retired-TC10 Delhi
DNF	66	(United Kingdom) T.E. Buckingham	(United Kingdom) T. Buckingham (United Kingdom) J. Lloyd (United Kingdom) D. Hackleton	Ford Cortina GT Mark II	Retired-TC9 Sarobi
DNF	14	(Germany) Ford Werke Deutschland AG	(Germany) Dieter Glemser (Germany) Martin Braungart	Ford Taunus 20M RS	Retired-TC8 Kabul
DNF	39	(Australia) Addison Motors	(Australia) Stewart McLeod (Australia) Jack Lock (Australia) Tony Theiler	Alfa Romeo 1750 Berlina	Retired-TC8 Kabul
DNF	59	(United Kingdom) Porsche	(United Kingdom) Terry Hunter (United Kingdom) John Davenport	Porsche 911S	Retired-TC8 Kabul
DNF	22	(Italy) Giancarlo Baghetti	(Italy) Giancarlo Baghetti (Italy) Giorgio Bassi	Lancia Fulvia Rallye 1.3 HF	Retired-TC8 Kabul
DNF	21	(United Kingdom) Hillcrest Motor Company	(United Kingdom) Berwyn Williams (United Kingdom) Martin Thomas (United Kingdom) Barry Hughes	BMC Austin 1800	Retired-TC8 Kabul
DNF	86	(United Kingdom) Pan Australian Unit Trust-Southern Cross Management	(United Kingdom) Colin Forsyth (United Kingdom) Robbie Uniacke (United Kingdom) James Rich	BMW 2000	Retired-TC8 Kabul
DNF	23	(United Kingdom) P.R.H. Wilson	(United Kingdom) Peter Wilson (Australia) Ian Mackelden (Australia) Keith Dwyer (United Kingdom) D. Maxwell	Ford Corsair 2000E	Retired-TC8 Kabul
DNF	35	(United Kingdom) R.A. Buchanan-Michaelson	(United Kingdom) Robert 'Bobby' Buchanan-Michaelson (United Kingdom) David Seigle-Morris (Australia) Max Stahl	Mercedes-Benz 280SE	Retired-TC8 Kabul
DNF	81	(India) Dr. Bomsi Wadia	(India) Bomsi Wadia (India) K. Tarmaster (India) F. Kaka	Ford Cortina GT Mark II	Retired-TC8 Kabul
DNF	50	(United Kingdom) Ford Motor Company	(United Kingdom) Nick Brittan (Australia) Jenny Brittan	Ford Cortina Lotus Mark II	Retired-TC8 Kabul
DNF	97	(Australia) Lunwin Products	(Australia) Reg Lunn (Australia) Clive Tippett (Australia) Jack Hall	Ford Falcon XT GT	Retired-TC7 Tehran
DNF	15	(Australia) G.P. Franklin	(Australia) Geoffrey Franklin (Australia) Kim Brassington	Ford Cortina GT Mark I	Retired-TC7 Tehran
DNF	65	(United Kingdom) Hydraulic Machinery	(United Kingdom) Graham White (United Kingdom) John Jeffcoat (United Kingdom) David Dunnell	BMC Austin 1800	Retired-TC7 Tehran
DNF	84	(United Kingdom) C.K.W. Schellenberg	(United Kingdom) Keith Schellenberg (United Kingdom) Norman Barclay (United Kingdom) Hon. Patrick Lindsay	Bentley 1930 Sports Tourer	Retired-TC6 Erzincan
DNF	5	(United Kingdom) Redge Lewis	(United Kingdom) Peter Lumsden (United Kingdom) Peter Sargent (United Kingdom) Redge Lewis (United Kingdom) John Fenton	Chrysler Valiant VE Safari Estate	Retired-TC5 Sivas
DNF	37	(United Kingdom) W.D. Cresdee	(United Kingdom) Dennis Cresdee (United Kingdom) Bob Freeborough (United Kingdom) Johnstone Syer	BMC Austin 1300 Countryman	Retired-TC5 Sivas
DNF	38	(United Kingdom) Ford Motor Company	(Sweden) Bengt Söderström (Sweden) Gunnar Palm	Ford Cortina Lotus Mark II	Retired-TC5 Sivas
DNF	85	(United Kingdom) Tecalemit	(United Kingdom) Peter Harper (United Kingdom) David Pollard	Ford Cortina Lotus Mark II	Retired-TC5 Sivas
DNF	16	(United Kingdom) D.A. Corbett	(United Kingdom) David Corbett (United Kingdom) Geoffrey Mabbs (United Kingdom) Tom Fisk	BMC Austin 1800	Retired-TC3 Belgrade
DNF	67	(United Kingdom) C.J. Woodley	(United Kingdom) Cecil Woodley (United Kingdom) Steven Green (United Kingdom) Richard Cullingford	Vauxhall Ventora	Retired-TC3 Belgrade
