= Hillman Estate Car =

Hillman Estate Car may refer to:

- A variant of the Hillman Minx
- A variant of the Rootes Arrow
