= Aava (surname) =

Aava is a surname. Notable people with the surname include:

- Aleksanteri Aava (1883–1956), Finnish poet and smallholder
- Moonika Aava (born 1979), Estonian javelin thrower
- Uno Aava (born 1928), Estonian racing driver and sports historian
- Urmo Aava (born 1979), Estonian rally driver
