= Hillman GT =

Hillman GT may refer to:

- a variant of the Hillman Hunter, an automobile produced by Chrysler Europe
- a variant of the Hillman Imp, an automobile produced by Chrysler Australia
