= Uno Aava =

Estonian racing driver

- Born: 22 November 1928 (age 97); Vologda, Russia
- Education: Tallinn University of Technology
- Occupations: Racing driver and sports historian.
- Awards: 1987: Merited Sport Personnel of Estonian SSR; 2001: best rally driver of 20th century of Estonia

Uno Aava (until 1938, Uno Grünmann; born 22 November 1928) is an Estonian racing driver and sports historian. In 2001 he was chosen to best rally driver of 20th century of Estonia.

He was born in Vologda, Russia. In 1967 he graduated from Tallinn University of Technology.

He began his racing career in 1958. He participated on 1968 London–Sydney Marathon, placed 22nd. In 1959 and 1963 he won Soviet Union championships. 1960–1970 he was a member of Soviet Union national racing team.

Awards:

- 1987: Merited Sport Personnel of Estonian SSR
- 2001: best rally driver of 20th century of Estonia
