= Mingary, South Australia =

Mingary South Australia
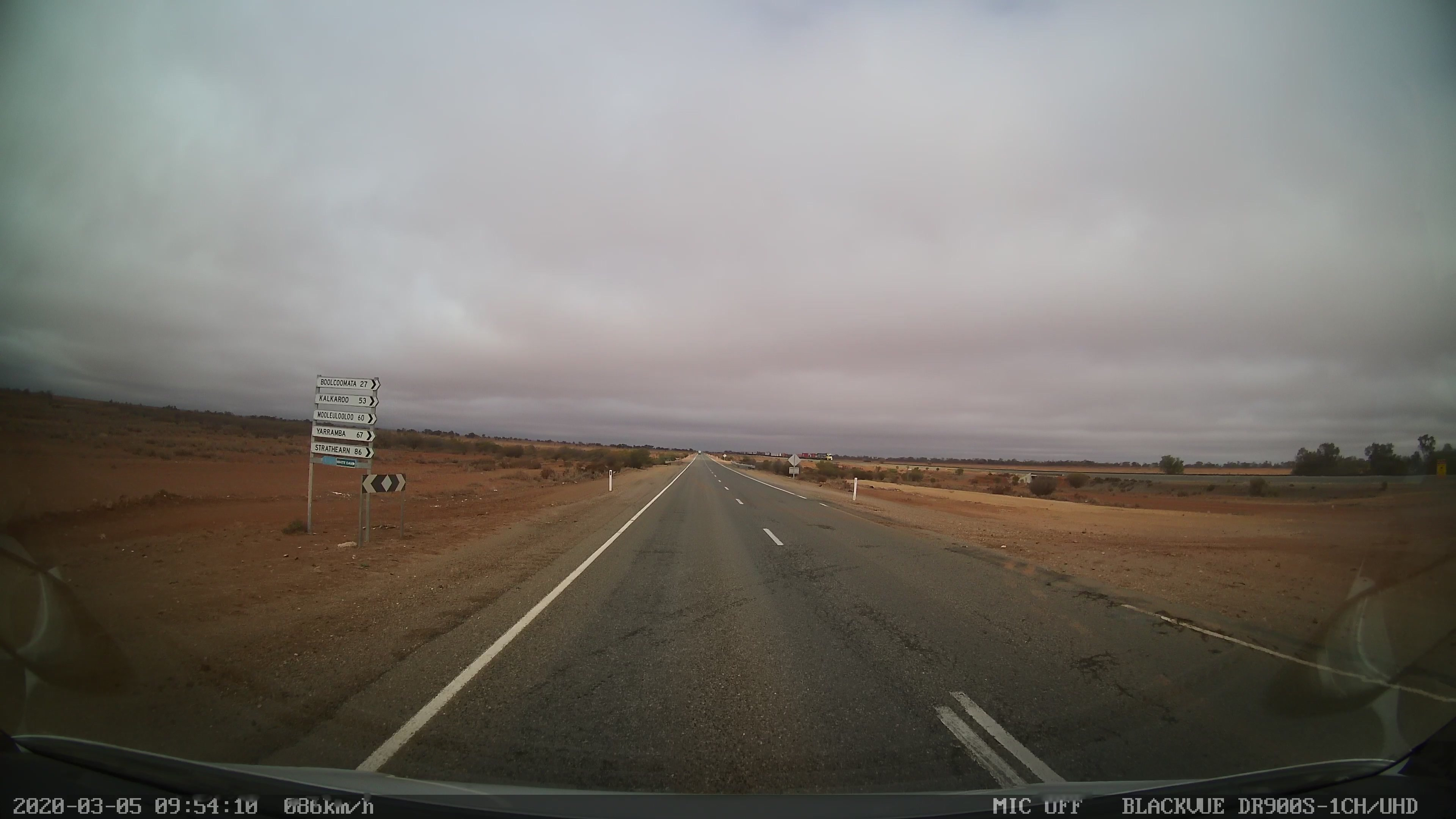
- Passing through Mingary on the Barrier Highway, March 2020

- Coordinates: 32°7′48″S 140°44′15″E
- Population: 75 (2016 census)
- Postcode(s): 5440
- Time zone: AEST (UTC+9:30)
  - Summer (DST): AEDT (UTC+10:30)
- LGA(s): Outback Communities Authority
- Region: Far North
- State electorate(s): Stuart
- Federal division(s): Grey

Mingary is a small rural locality in the Outback Communities Authority of South Australia, Australia.

At the 2016 census, the town recorded a population of 75.
