= Rootes Arrow =

Rootes "Arrow" series
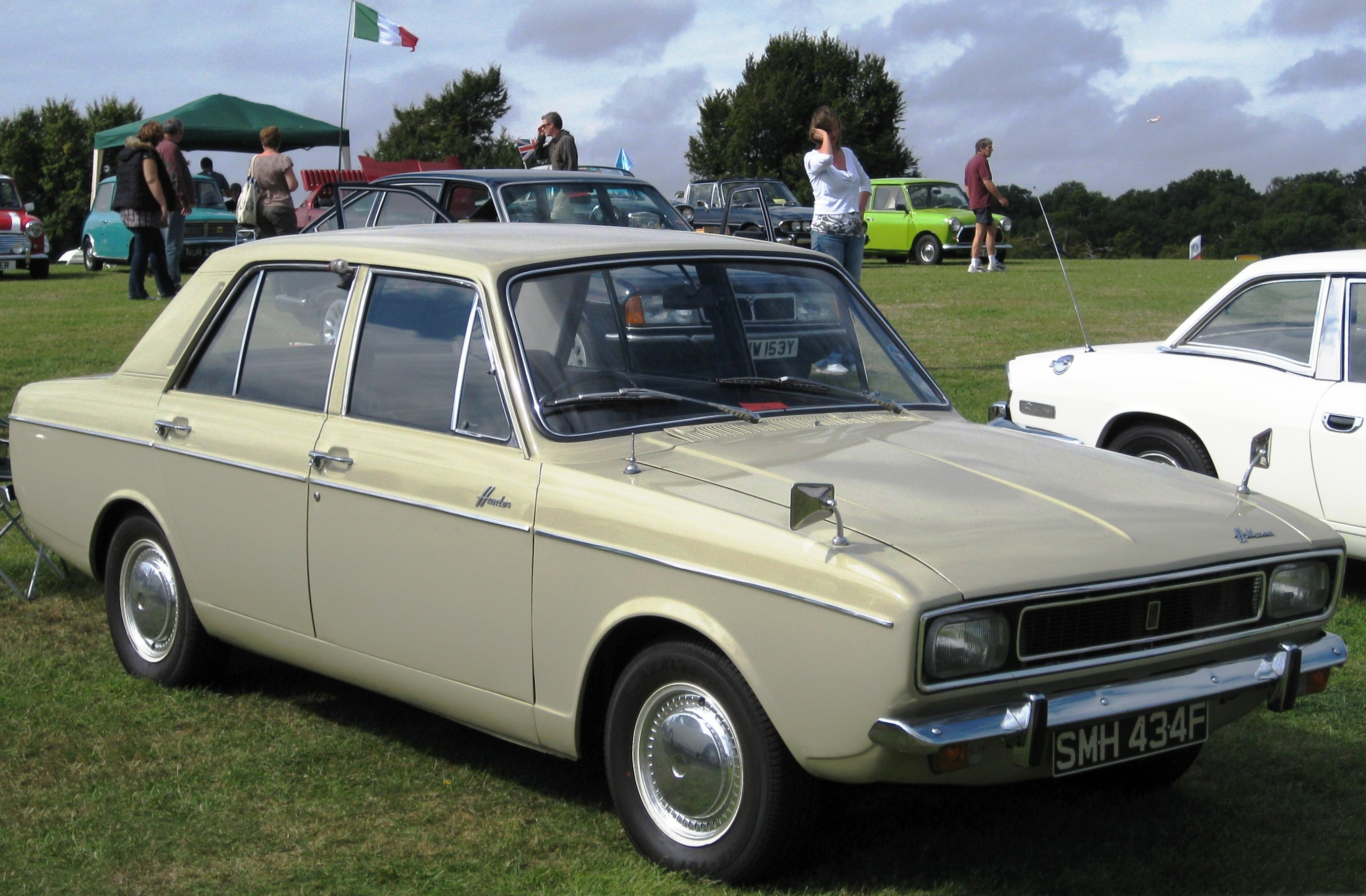
- 1967 Hillman Hunter Saloon

Overview
- Manufacturer: Rootes Group (1966–1970); Chrysler Europe (1970–1979)
- Also called: List: Hillman Hunter; Hillman Hustler; Hillman Minx; Humber Sceptre; Dodge Husky; Dodge Polara (Colombia); Chrysler Vogue; Chrysler Hunter; Paykan; Sunbeam Alpine; Sunbeam Rapier; Sunbeam Sceptre; Singer Vogue; Singer Gazelle
- Production: 1966–1979 (Europe & Australasia); 1970-1981 (Colombia); 1967–2005 (Iran); 1967–2014 (Iran; pick-up truck)
- Assembly: United Kingdom: Ryton-on-Dunsmore; United Kingdom: Linwood; Australia: Port Melbourne (Chrysler Australia); Iran: Tehran (Iran Khodro); Ireland: Santry; Colombia: Colmotores; Malaysia: Shah Alam; Malta: Marsa (Car Assembly); New Zealand: Petone (Todd Motors); New Zealand: Porirua (from 1975); Philippines: Manila (CKD: from 1969); South Africa: Silverton, Pretoria (Stanley Motors)
- Designer: Rex Fleming (overall); Roy Axe (estate and coupé)

Body and chassis
- Class: Small family car (C)
- Body style: 4-door saloon; 5-door estate; 2-door coupé; 2-door coupé utility (pick up)
- Layout: FR layout
- Related: See article for list of Arrow marques Paykan

Powertrain
- Engine: 1496 cc Hillman I4; 1725 cc Hillman I4; 1796 cc XM PSA Group (Iran: 1991–1997)
- Transmission: 4 speed manual 4-speed manual + D-type Laycock Overdrive (1966–1972); 4-speed manual + J-type Laycock Overdrive (1972 on); 3-speed Borg-Warner 35/65 automatic

Dimensions
- Wheelbase: 98.4 in (2,500 mm) (saloon)
- Length: 170.6 in (4,333 mm) (saloon)
- Width: 63.5 in (1,613 mm) (saloon)
- Height: 56.0 in (1,422 mm) (saloon)
- Curb weight: 2,100 lb (953 kg) (saloon)

Chronology
- Predecessor: Hillman Minx
- Successor: Hillman Avenger (C) Talbot Solara (D)

Rootes Arrow was the manufacturer's name for a range of cars produced under several badge-engineered marques by the Rootes Group (later Chrysler Europe) from 1966 to 1979 in Europe, and continuing on until 2005 in Iran. It is amongst the last Rootes designs, developed with no influence from future owner Chrysler. The range is almost always referred to by the name of the most prolific model, the Hillman Hunter.

A substantial number of separate marque and model names were applied to this single car platform. Some were given different model names to justify trim differences (Hillman GT, Hillman Estate Car) and, from time to time, models were sold in some European markets under the Sunbeam marque (Sunbeam Sceptre for instance), and at other times used UK marque/model names. Singer Gazelle and Vogue models were also sold in the UK for one season badged as Sunbeams after the Singer brand was withdrawn.

The models sold – not all concurrently – were, alphabetically by marque:

- Chrysler Hunter, Chrysler Vogue
- Dodge Husky
- Hillman Arrow, Hillman Break de Chasse, Hillman Estate Car, Hillman GT, Hillman Hunter, Hillman Hustler, Hillman Minx, Hillman Vogue
- Humber Sceptre
- Iran National Paykan
- Singer Gazelle and Singer Vogue
- Sunbeam Alpine and Sunbeam Rapier fastback coupés
- Sunbeam Arrow, Sunbeam Break de Chasse, Sunbeam Hunter, Sunbeam Minx, Sunbeam Sceptre, and Sunbeam Vogue

The most prolific model within the Arrow range, the Hillman Hunter, was the Coventry-based company's major competitor in the small family car segment. In its 13-year production run, its UK market contemporaries included the Ford Cortina, Vauxhall Victor, Austin/Morris 1800, and Morris Marina. The sports-orientated Sunbeam Rapier occupied a segment contested by the Ford Capri, MGB GT, Vauxhall Firenza, and to an extent the Triumph Dolomite, while the more upmarket Humber Sceptre competed with other premium-specification cars based on conventional saloons, such as the Vanden Plas 1300 and 1500, the Wolseley 18/85, and the Ford Cortina 1600E and 2000E.

The Arrow range extended to several body styles: saloon, estate, fastback coupé and a two different coupe utilities (pick-ups) (the Dodge Husky from South Africa and the Paykan Pick-Up in Iran, each model had a unique body). Depending on the model, they had two doors or four doors. Not all marques were represented in all body styles, with the coupés being reserved for Sunbeam.

== Development ==
The Arrow range was conceived in 1962. Following the Hillman Imp, consideration was given to developing a larger rear-engined car, but this concept was dismissed, and the engineering settled on for the new car was more conventional and closer to the layout of the existing Audax series (which included the previous Hillman Minx).

With cash-strapped Rootes struggling amid continuing engine cooling problems with the Imp, which often resulted in warped cylinder heads, the cautious Arrow broke little new engineering ground. New parts were largely based on tried and tested Rootes components, using a new but strong 5-bearing version of the well-proven 1725 cc overhead valve petrol engine as a starting point which varied in output from 66 to 88 bhp (49 to 66 kW) (in the Humber Sceptre). The engine was inclined by a modest 15 degrees, to allow for a lower bonnet line and to enable packaging of the carburettors. This engine was further uprated by specialists Holbay, employing two Weber 40DCOE carburettors to produce 107 bhp (80 kW) for the Sunbeam Rapier H120 and Hillman Hunter GLS. A smaller 1500 cc engine was the standard for manual versions of the Hillman Minx and the Singer Gazelle, and the Hillman Hunter DeLuxe model which succeeded the Minx. Automatic models were all powered by the 1725 cc engine. Particular attention was paid to weight and cost to bring the vehicle in line with its natural competitors, including the Mark 2 Ford Cortina.

For the first time in a Rootes car MacPherson strut suspension featured at the front, with a conventional live axle mounted on leaf springs at the rear. Other firsts for Rootes in the new car were curved side glass and flow-through ventilation.

Manual transmissions were available in four-speed form with an optional Laycock de Normanville overdrive, or Borg-Warner automatic transmission, again as an option. Initially, the Borg Warner Type 35 3-speed automatic was offered, then the Type 45 four-speed automatic became available in 1973.

The handbrake was situated between the driver's seat and door (i.e. on the driver's right-hand side for a right-hand drive car) rather than between the front seats. This followed the practice established with the 'Audax' cars.

The first Arrow model to be launched, the Hillman Hunter, was presented as a replacement for the Hillman Super Minx. The Hunter was lighter than its predecessor and the wheel-base of the new car was actually 2 1/2 inches (64 mm) shorter than that of the old, but the length of the passenger cabin was nonetheless increased by moving the engine and the toe-board forwards.

For the first two years there were few changes. However, in May 1968 power assisted brakes were made available as a factory fitted option. Hitherto this possibility had been offered only as a kit for retro-fitting: it was stated that the factory fitted servo-assistance, at a domestic market price slightly below £13, would be cheaper for customers.

A mild facelift in 1970 gave new grilles to the various Hunter trim levels, and some derivatives gained a (then) more fashionable dashboard, exchanging wood for plastic, but the car remained fundamentally the same throughout its life.

A more detailed facelift for 1972 brought a new all-plastic dashboard with deeply hooded round dials (earlier versions had either a strip speedometer or round dials in a flat dashboard for more expensive models like the Vogue), new steering wheel, plastic instead of metal air cleaner, reshaped squarer headlamps in a new grille and some engine tuning changes.

For 1975, bumpers were enlarged and the tail lights were enclosed in a full-width anodised aluminium trim piece.

Following the 1967 acquisition of Rootes by Chrysler, the Arrow derivatives were rationalised until only the Hillman Hunter version was left by 1976. From September 1977 it was re-badged as a Chrysler, which it was to be for the remaining 2 years of its life. Hunter production was switched in 1969 to Rootes' troubled Imp plant in Linwood, from its original home of Ryton.

Sales were lower after 1975 following the launch of the Chrysler Alpine, a similar sized car but with front-wheel drive and a hatchback bodystyle, at a time when rear-wheel drive saloons still dominated in this sector.

Following the Hillman Avenger's move to Linwood in 1976, the very last European Hunters were assembled in the Santry plant, Shanowen Road, Ireland from "complete knock down" (CKD) kits until production ended in 1979 – but no evidence exists to suggest that the Talbot badge was applied to any production Hunter following Chrysler Europe's 1978 takeover by Peugeot, and the application of that badge to other Chrysler models sold on or after 1 August 1979.

The final Chrysler Hunter was built in September 1979 in Porirua, New Zealand, and was donated to the Southward Museum. In 2000 the Museum sold the car to a private collector.

== Models and market positions ==
As Rootes looked to rationalise the number of platforms and the total engineering cost of their vehicle line-up during the 1960s, they kept alive the many names of the companies they had purchased to maintain product differentiation in the market place. As such, the Arrow was simultaneously aimed at several slightly different market segments, using a range of brand and model names during the car's 13-year production run.

=== Hillman ===
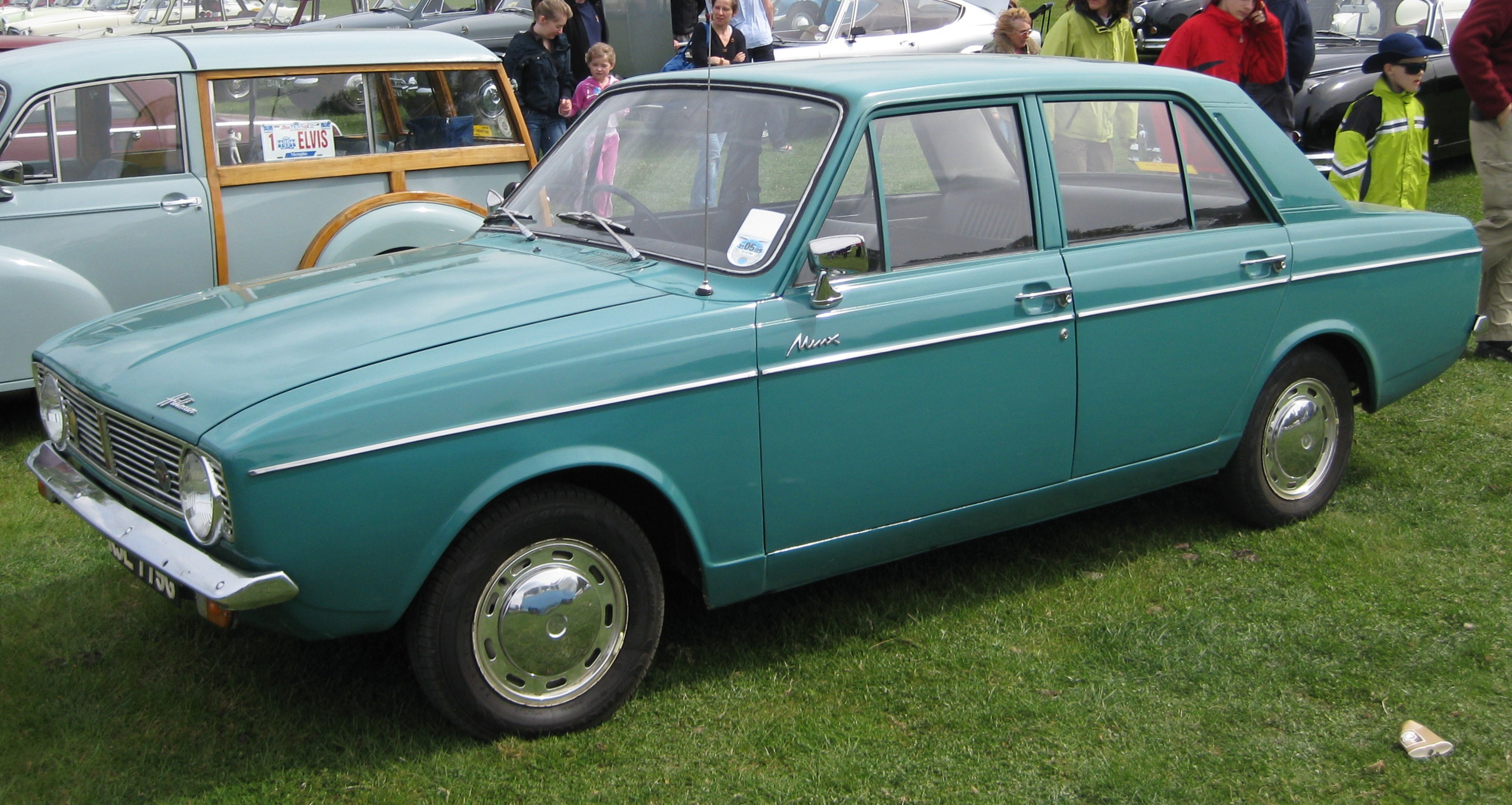
1970 Hillman Minx

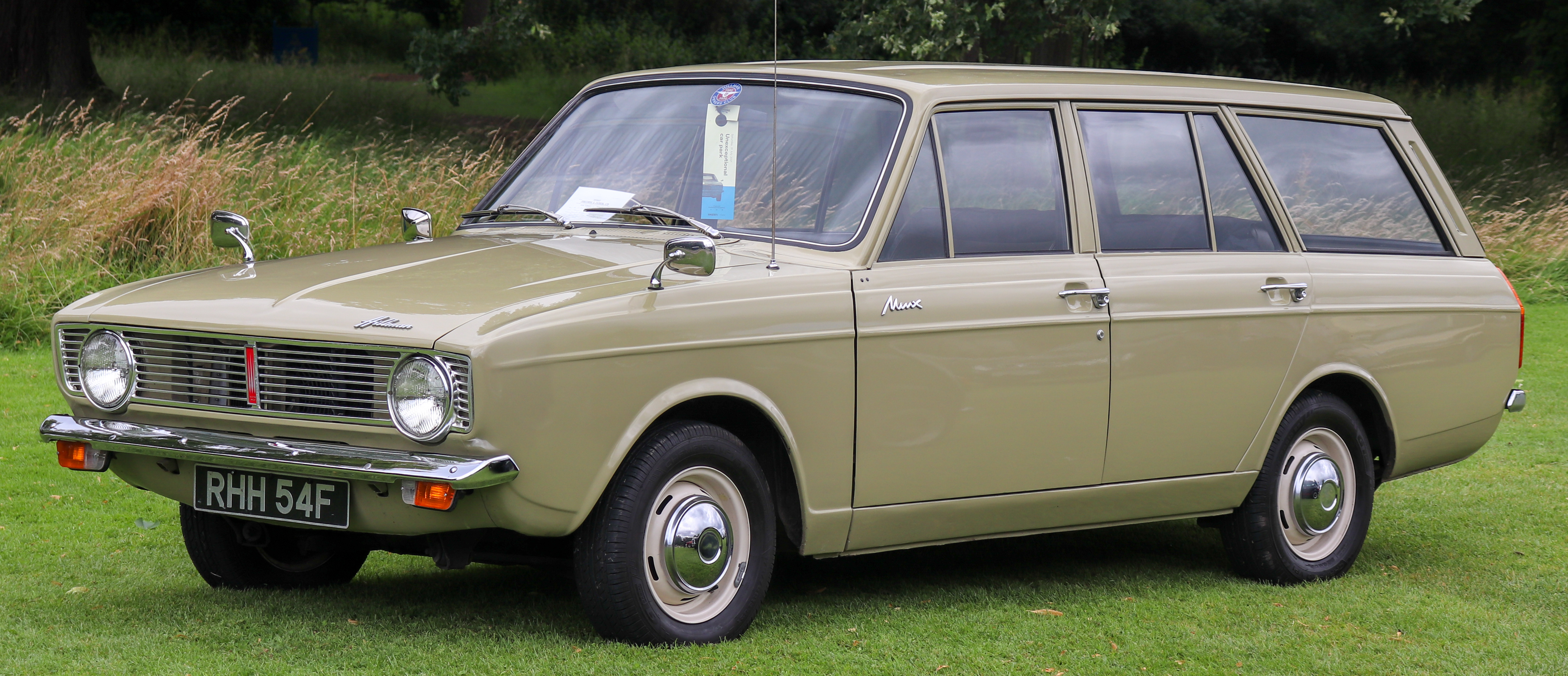

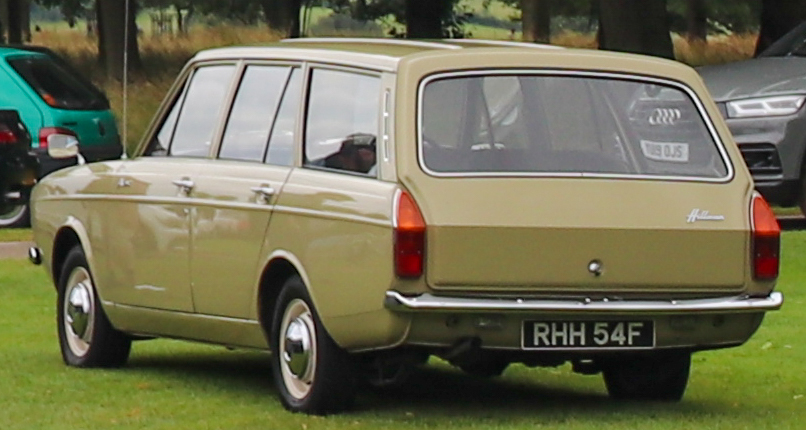
1968 Hillman Minx Estate

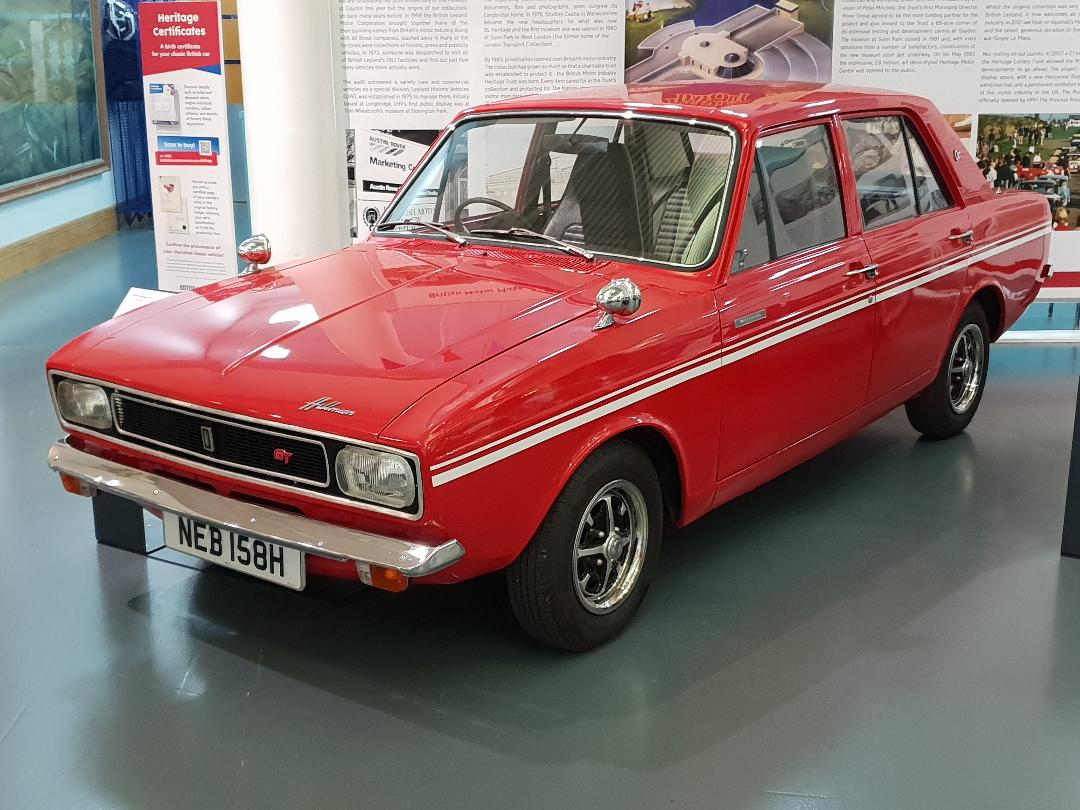
1969 Hillman GT

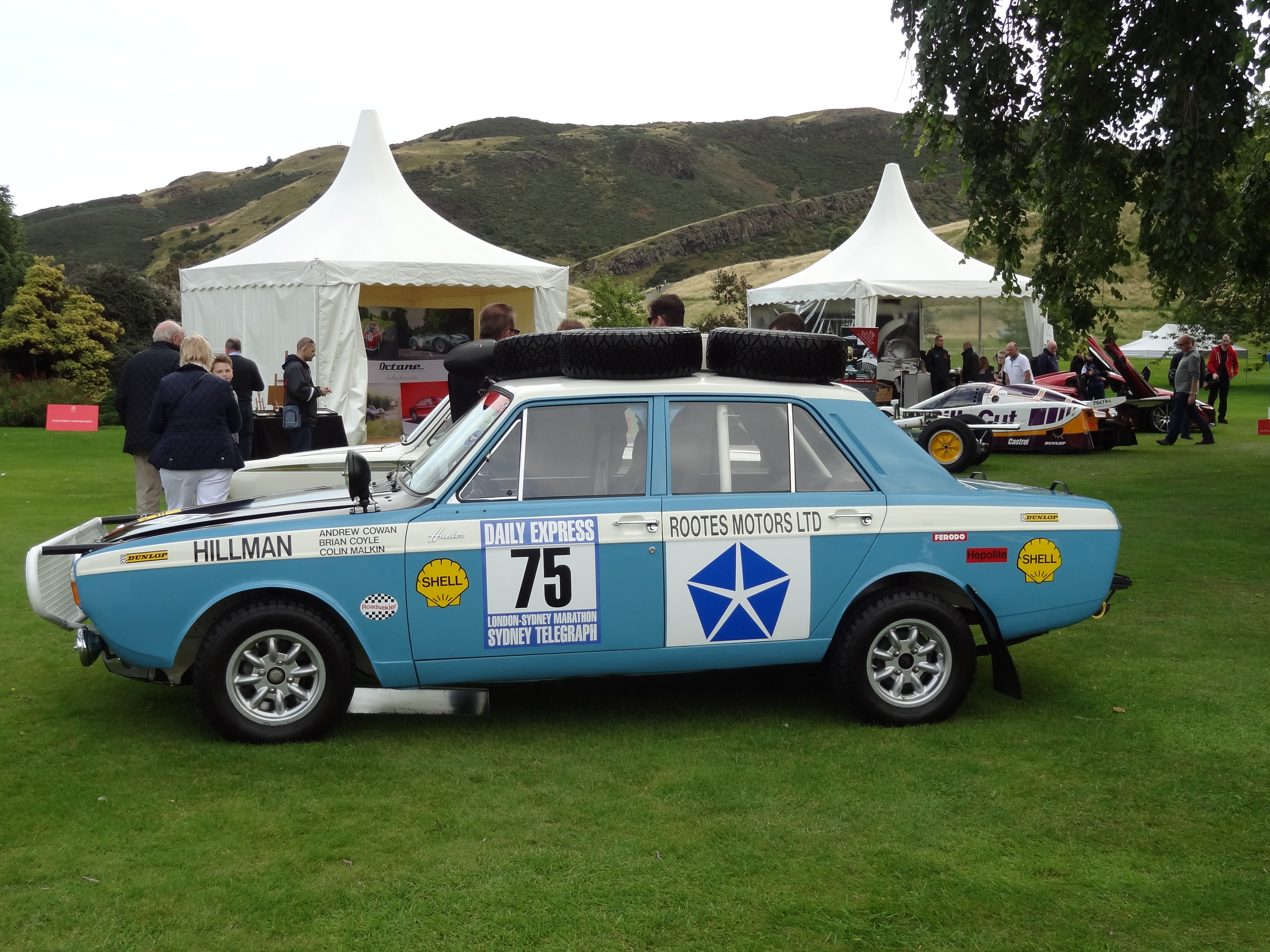
The Hillman Hunter which Andrew Cowan drove to victory in the 1968 London-Sydney Marathon

The first models, launched on the domestic market in October 1966 with a 1725 cc engine, were given the Hillman Hunter name with the respected name Hillman Minx (for the cheaper 1496 cc version), following in January 1967. Hillman would remain the British group's most prolific marque. The Hunter model name was not in fact entirely new for a Rootes-related car, having been used for one year's production of the Singer SM1500.

Sports models included the Hillman GT, which was based on the Minx trim, but was a model in its own right (not a "Hillman Minx GT" nor "Hillman Hunter GT"). It featured a twin Zenith Stromberg CD150 carburettor version of the 1725 engine developing 94 bhp (70 kW) and Ro-Style wheels. in 1972 came the Hillman Hunter GLS with a specially tuned twin-Weber-carburettor engine (by Holbay) shared with the Sunbeam Rapier H120 model, as well as close-ratio gearbox and quad headlights.

The estate version, announced in April 1967, was originally launched as the "Hillman Estate Car" without either Hunter or Minx badging. It came with a one-piece tailgate which was much cheaper to produce than the horizontally split two piece tailgate featured on the car it replaced, but the change nevertheless drew some unfavourable press comment.

The car's image was boosted when a Hunter driven by Andrew Cowan won the 1968 London-Sydney Marathon.

The range was soon simplified with trim levels and varying engine specifications: the Hillman Hunter DeLuxe or DL replaced the Minx and retained the Minx 1496 cc engine; the 1725 cc engine with an iron cylinder head being an option on these entry-level models. Above that were the Hunter Super and Hunter GL, both with the higher specification alloy headed engine and two different trim levels. The twin carburettor engined "Hillman Hunter GT" eventually replaced the Hillman GT, and the Holbay-engined GLS was positioned at the top of the range.

For the 1975 Motor Show, a limited edition Hillman Hunter Topaz was produced. This was largely based on the Hunter Super and equipped with overdrive, radio, vinyl roof, Rostyle wheels and a special half cloth upholstery as standard. This car was only available in a unique metallic bronze paint finish. The price was less than that of the standard Hunter Super when fitted with the optional overdrive. A Hillman Break de Chasse was sold in French-speaking markets, based on the Minx specification. (Also offered was a similar Sunbeam Break de Chasse; "break" being a French term for an estate, and the phrase break de chasse translating roughly as shooting-brake.)

=== Singer ===
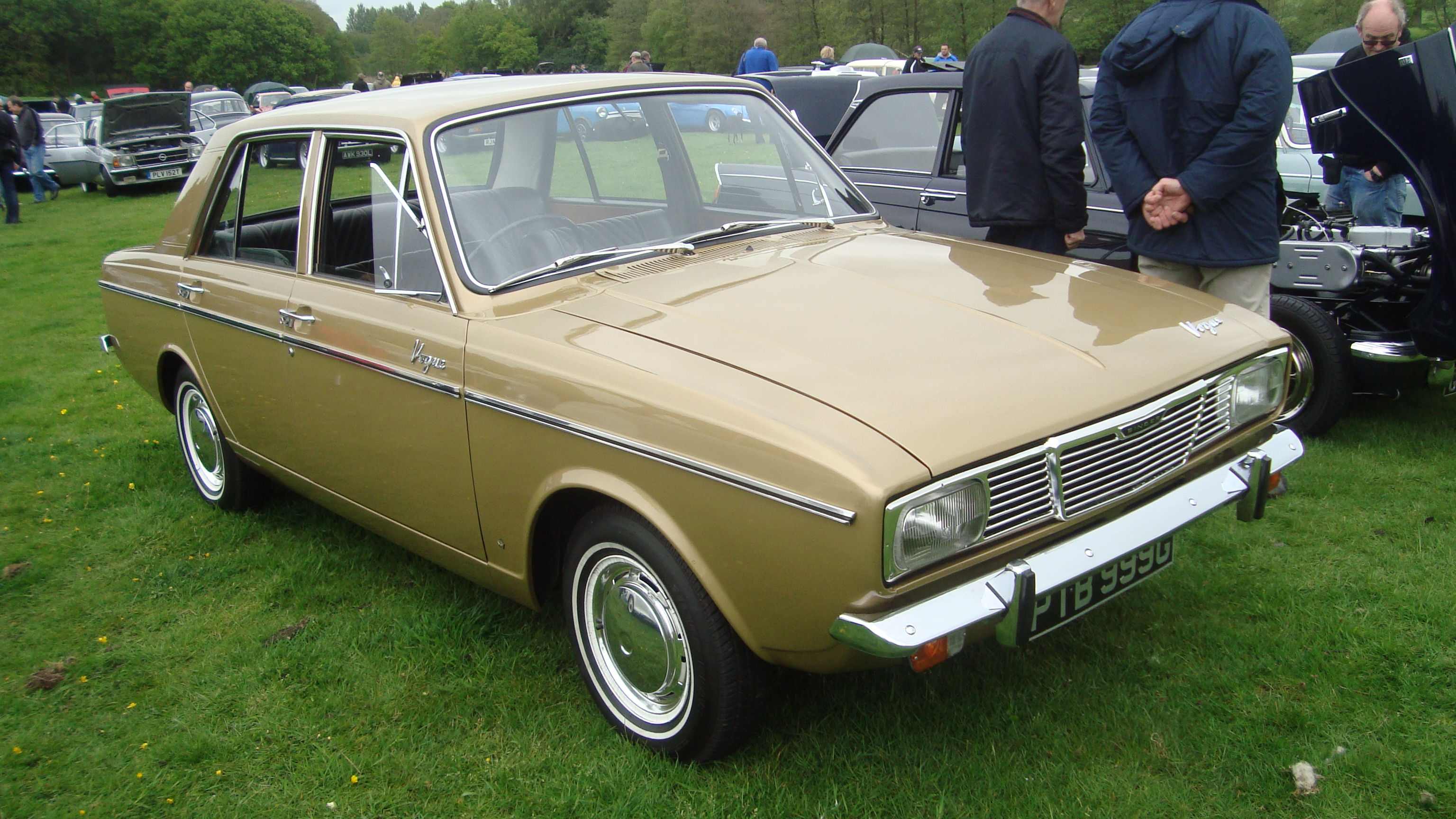
1969 Singer Vogue

The Singer Vogue and Singer Gazelle were positioned slightly upmarket of the Hillman Hunter and the Minx respectively. Nevertheless, the need to compete on price was evidenced with the announcement of the Singer Vogue estate car. The Vogue saloon was fitted with an alternator, but the Vogue estate, announced in April 1967, was fitted with a dynamo; the manufacturers explained that the change was made to help keep the model's recommended UK-market selling price below £1,000.

The Singers were short-lived models, retired early in 1970 along with the rest of the Singer range. Briefly following the retirement of the Singer brand, and throughout the model life for principal export markets, the Singer Vogue was badged as a Sunbeam.

=== Sunbeam ===
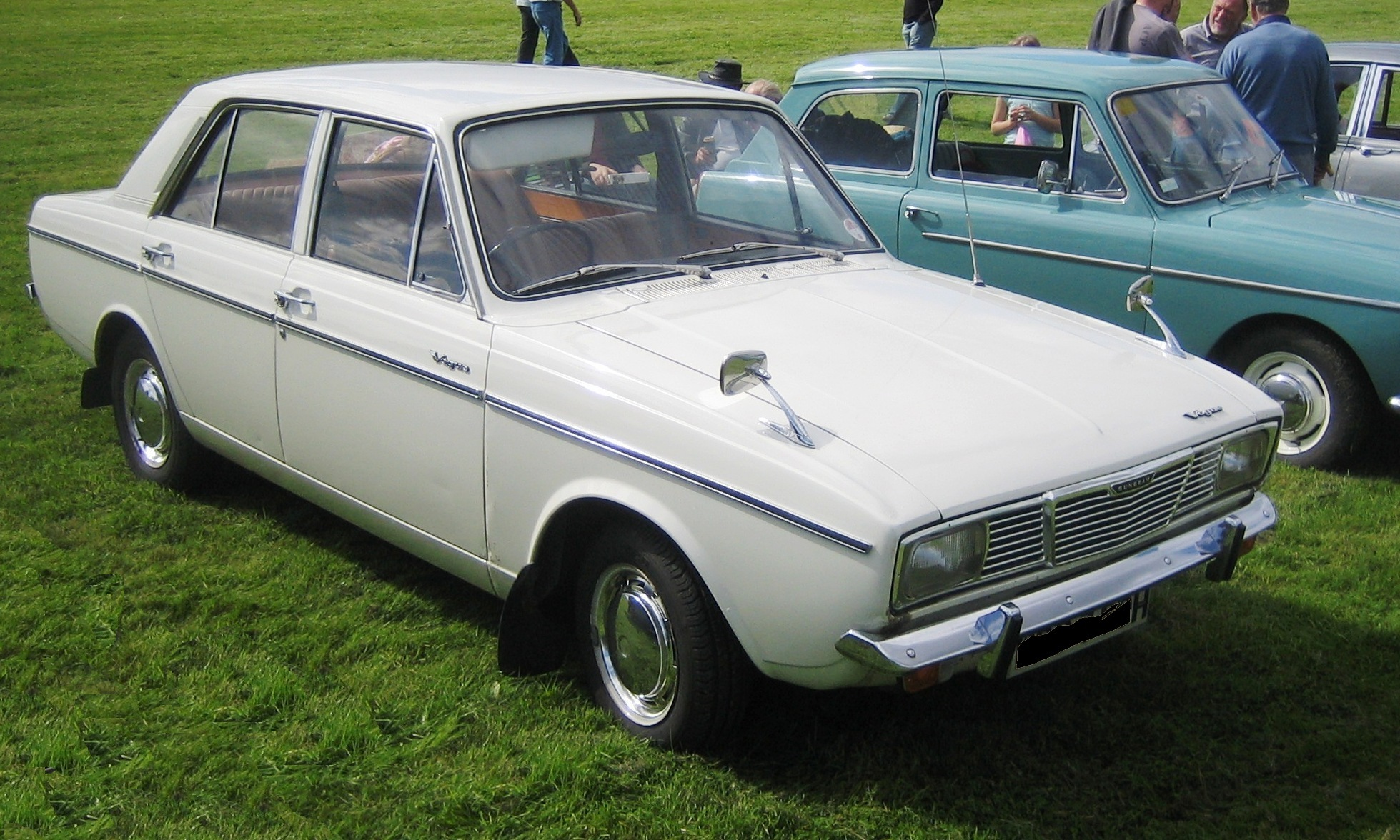
Circa 1969 Sunbeam Vogue

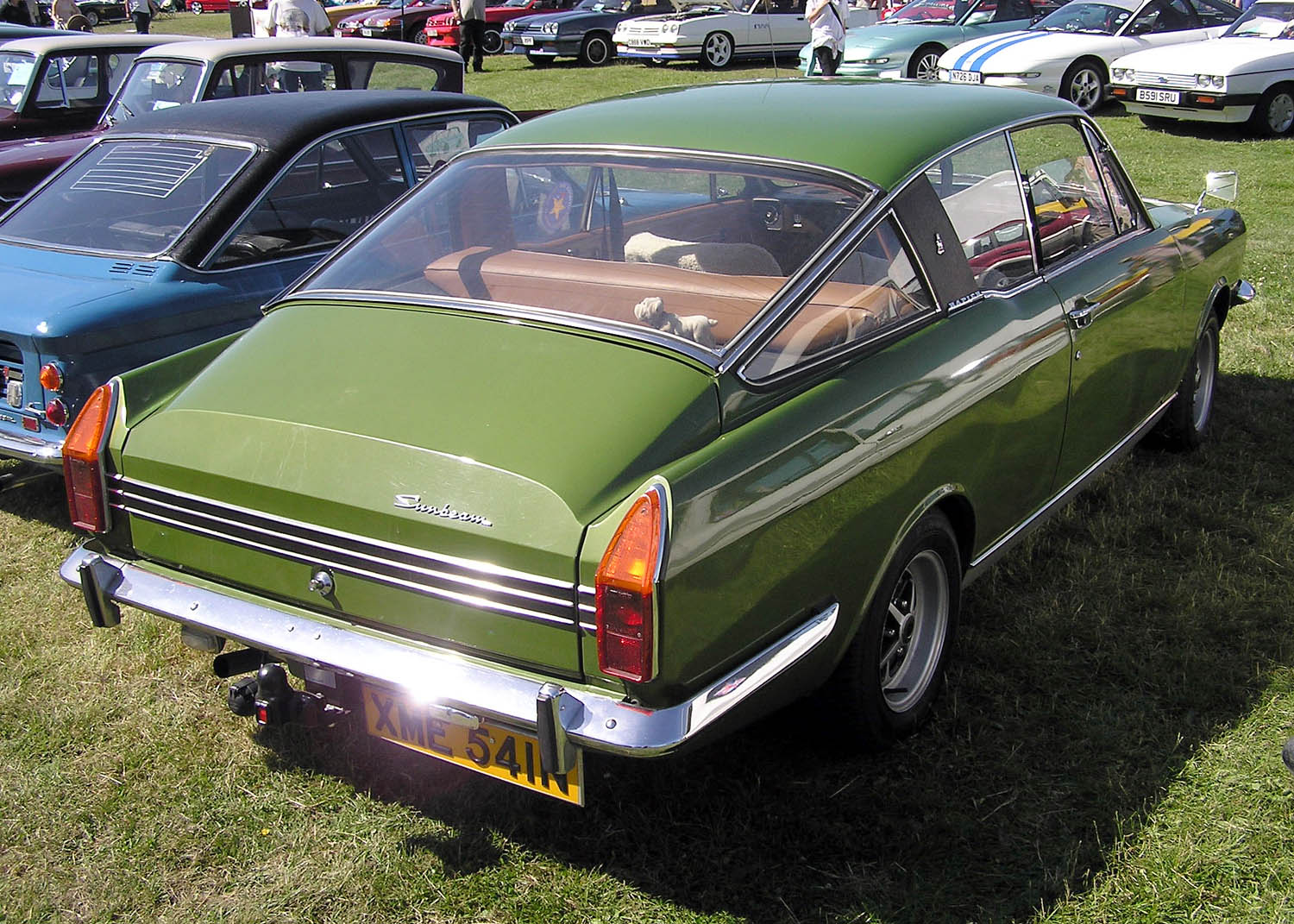
1974 Sunbeam Rapier fastback coupé in "Grasshopper" green

The single-carburettor Sunbeam Alpine and twin-carburettor Sunbeam Rapier were only sold as fastback coupés, and were marketed with a strong sporting image – although it was eventually the Hillman Hunter which was used in long-distance rallying. The sportiest Sunbeam was the Rapier H120 model, though this shared its specially tuned Holbay engine with the Hillman Hunter GLS.

Sunbeam Arrow, Sunbeam Break de Chasse, Sunbeam Hunter, Sunbeam Minx, Sunbeam Sceptre and Sunbeam Vogue were used for export markets where the Sunbeam name was more familiar or deemed more likely to succeed. The Sunbeam Arrow name was used in North America. Sunbeam Break de Chasse, Hunter, Vogue and Minx were offered in some French-speaking markets (where "break" is a term for an estate).

A variant with "Sunbeam Sceptre" badging appeared in France and some German-speaking markets (and possibly others), and carried the Humber Sceptre level of specification, as described below. The Sunbeam Vogue was also available in the home (British) market for a short period after the Singer marque was retired in 1970.

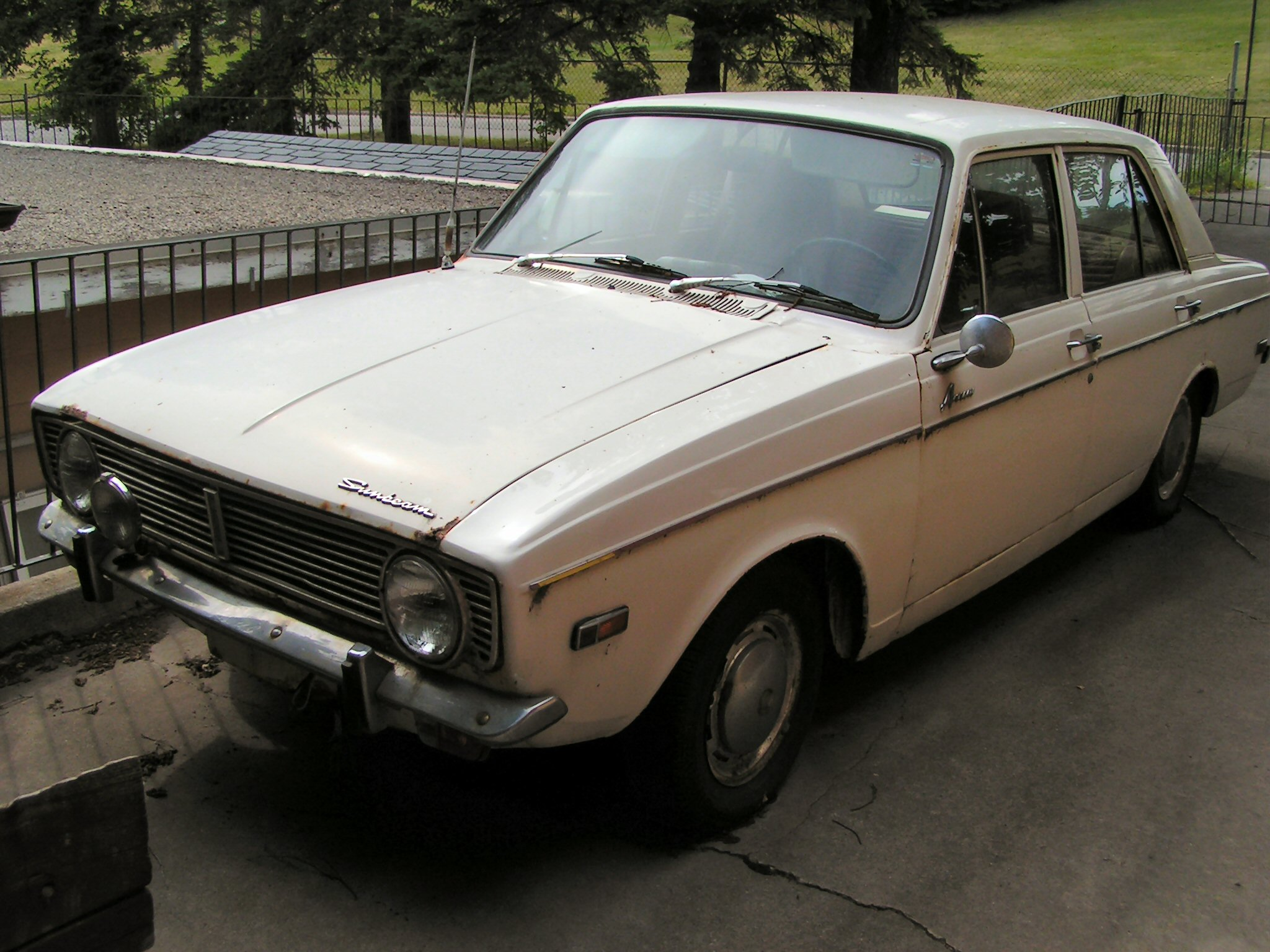
The Sunbeam Arrow name was used in North American markets

=== Humber ===
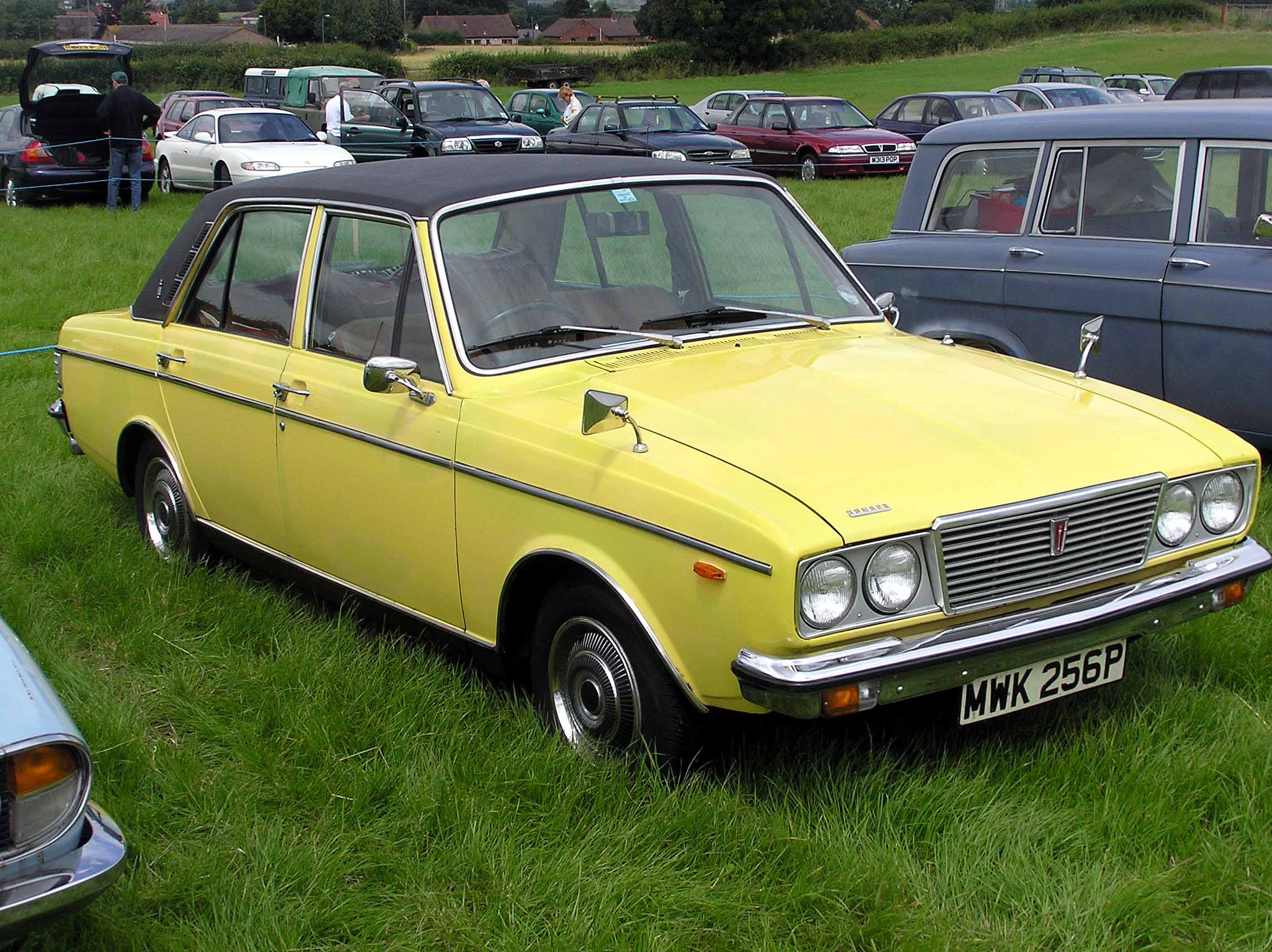
1975 Humber Sceptre

The Humber Sceptre traded on Humber's tradition of building luxury cars and was the best-appointed version. It was marketed as a Sunbeam Sceptre in some markets.

The manual-gearbox model featured either the D-type or the later J-type Laycock De Normanville overdrive, with the J-type fitted from chassis numbers L3 onwards starting in July 1972. As with all Arrows, an automatic gearbox was an option. A closer ratio G-type gearbox was fitted to later Sceptres, using the J-type overdrive.

An estate version of the Humber Sceptre was introduced at the London Motor Show in October 1974. It featured a built-in roof rack and a carpeted loading floor protected by metal strips and illuminated by an additional interior light. Washer and wiper were provided for the rear window, a rare feature on UK-market estate cars of the time.

=== Chrysler Hunter ===
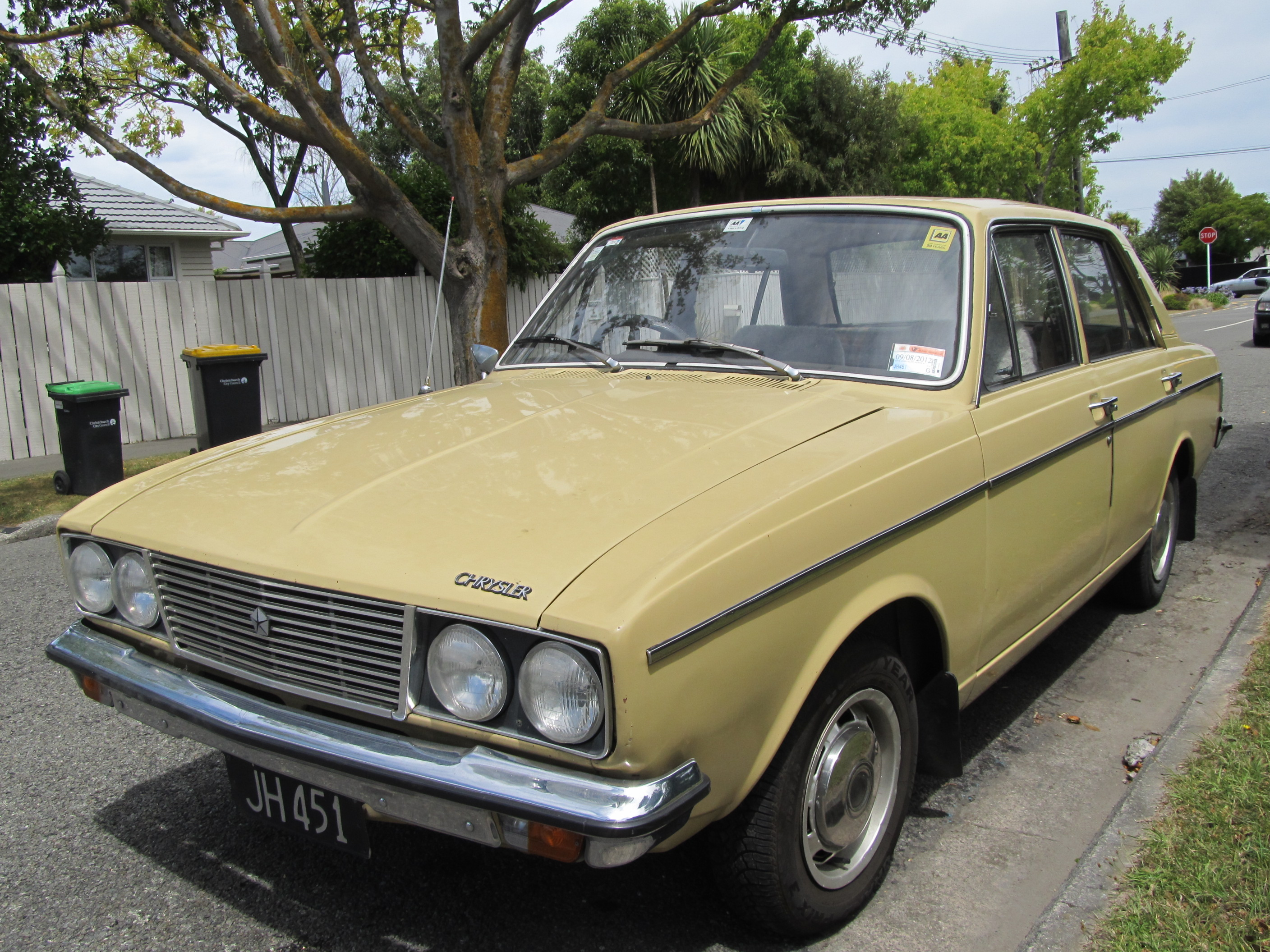
1979 Chrysler Hunter Saloon

The Hillman Hunter was rebranded as the Chrysler Hunter for the UK market in September 1976, receiving at the same time a four headlight frontal treatment similar to that of the Hunter GLS model and the Humber Sceptre. In order to try to prolong the model life an improved level of equipment included a central console and a voltmeter. The Super version also featured an aluminium-head engine and viscous fan coupling along with reclining seats, a vinyl-covered roof and "simulated wood treatment" for the facia and door sills. By this time, however, Chrysler UK dealers had been selling the French-built Chrysler Alpine for more than two years: more than ten years after the launch of the original Hillman Hunter, the Chrysler Hunter was self-evidently a run-out model, and relatively few were produced. According to How Many Left, only 7 remain in the UK with only 1 still on the road. The European operations of Chrysler were sold to Peugeot just before the end of Hunter production in 1979, although the Chrysler branding was briefly retained, with the Talbot marque being introduced across Europe from 1 August 1979.

It was effectively replaced by the Talbot Solara – a four-door saloon version of the Alpine hatchback – which was launched in April 1980.

== Production outside Britain ==
=== Australia ===
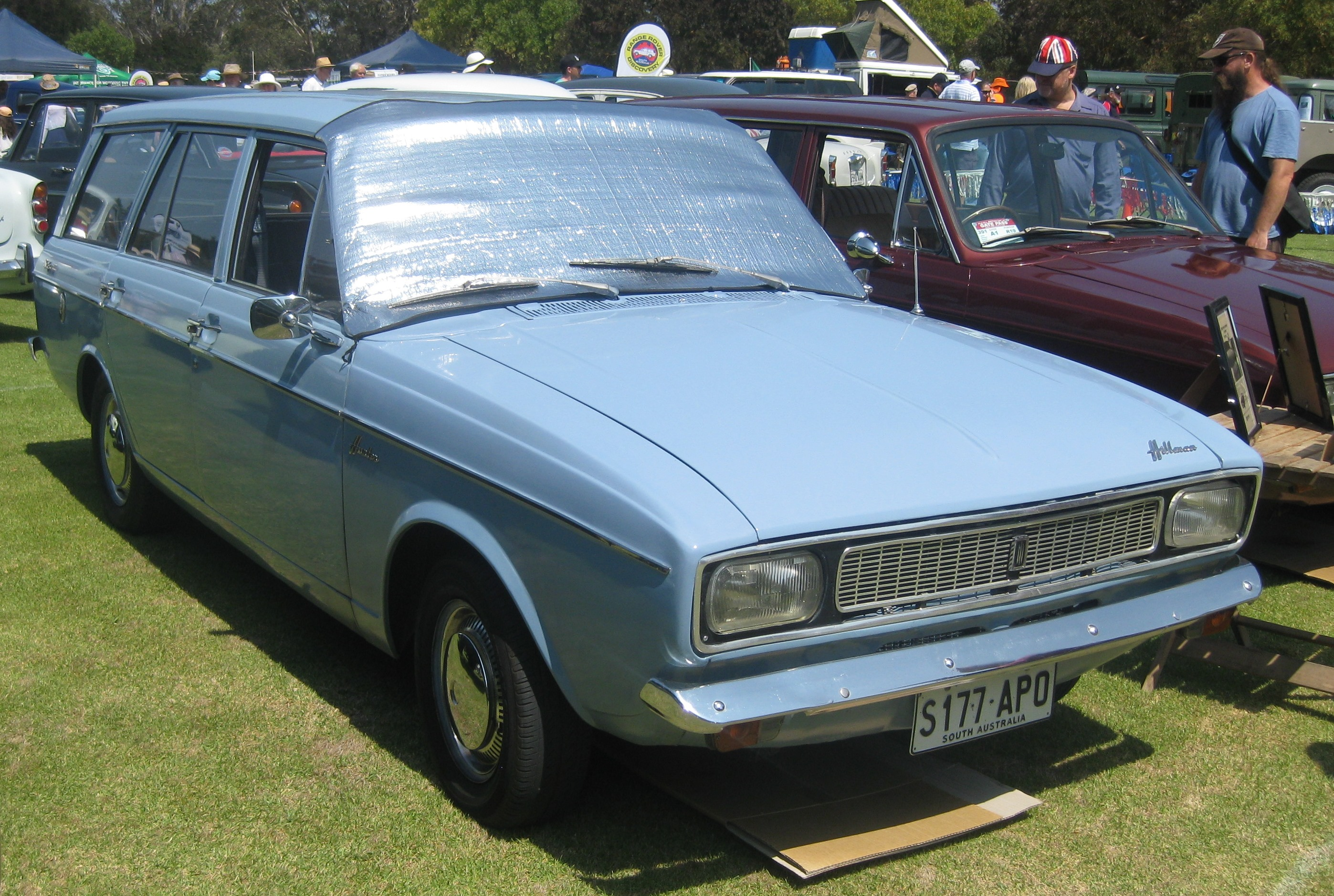
Australian-built Hillman Hunter Safari HC (1968–1970)

Commencing in 1967, Chrysler Australia Ltd assembled the Hillman Hunter from imported CKD packs at their Port Melbourne factory, which they inherited as part of Chrysler's acquisition of Rootes Australia. Designated as the HB series, the range comprised two models, the Arrow with basic vinyl upholstery and floormats, and the Hunter, with better quality upholstery and carpeted floors. A Hunter Safari wagon was added to the range in May 1968. The Safari name was also used to identify the Australian Chrysler Valiant wagons. The Safari was a popular seller, particularly as the competing Holden Torana was not available as an estate / station wagon.

The HC series was released in November 1968. Major changes were the adoption of the UK face-lifted Hunter radiator grille and rectangular headlights, and the renaming of the Arrow as the Hunter, retaining the Arrow's trim specification and bench seat. The Hunter was renamed to Hunter Royal, the model corresponding in trim level with the UK Singer Vogue, but retaining the Hunter plastic moulded dashboard, with simulated wood trim. An additional model, the Hunter GT, corresponded with the UK Humber Sceptre in trim level, but utilized the standard Hunter grille. These cars featured trim parts from various UK models, including UK Humber Sceptre bonnet ornaments.

In 1970, the Australian version of the Hunter was face-lifted again, with the introduction of the HE series. Marketing of the car, plus its rear badges, referred to it as the Hunter, rather than a Hillman. The facelift involved a change to the radiator grille, with new and smaller rectangular headlights. Also, the appearance of the rear of the car was changed with a flush trim panel under the boot lid and new twin-lens tail lights. Depending on the model, this panel was painted in the body colour, matte grey or matte black (Hustler Model); this facelift was unique to Australia. Inside, the HE models received a new collapsible steering column, with the Valiant's steering wheel.

The model range was later modified again: a new cut price performance version called the Hustler was introduced. This was similar in concept and execution to the UK Hillman GT – a sparsely trimmed car with high performance. The Hustler was powered by the Rootes Group 1725cc engine, equipped with alloy head and twin Stromberg side-draught carburettors. The Hustler's styling alluded to its big brother; the Chrysler Valiant (VG) Pacer.

The Hunter GT was renamed the Hunter Royal 660. Outside, this car gained Rostyle wheels. Inside, the car was trimmed in the same "buffalo grain" textured vinyl, which also was to be found in the VG series luxury Valiant, the Regal 770.

These cars sold steadily, but they became overshadowed when Chrysler Australia commenced assembly of the Mitsubishi Galant in 1972. By this time, the Mitsubishi was a conspicuously more modern car, and the last Australian Hunter was produced in November 1972. The stockpile of vehicles took almost a year to clear and the Hunter became the last Rootes car to be marketed in Australia. Chrysler Australia then closed the former Rootes factory, focusing Australian production at its Tonsley Park plant in Adelaide.

=== New Zealand ===
New Zealand importer and CKD assembler Todd Motors also created its own unique versions of the Arrow line. The single 1967 launch version (1725 cc aluminium head engine with four-speed manual transmission or three-speed Borg Warner 35 automatic transmission with twin front seats) was almost identical to its UK counterpart but Todd started to use its own upholstery designs from the 1969 rectangular headlight update. For 1970, it added a silver rear trim panel and a 'by Chrysler' boot lid badge to the Hunter saloon and introduced the estate although this had a lower specification than the saloon – an iron head 1725 cc engine, no automatic option, simpler dashboard trim (no locking glovebox), interior door pull handles instead of armrests (sedans had them on the three passenger doors), painted rather than bright metal door window frame trim and fixed rather than opening front quarter-lights. Because the hand brake was between the driver's seat and the driver's door, for safety reasons, there wasn't an arm rest on the driver's door.

Todd's also offered a Singer Vogue saloon with a 1725 cc engine and a more upmarket wood veneer dashboard from 1967 to 1971. It was replaced by the Hunter GL.

The range was given a unique-to-NZ update early in 1971: the iron head "deluxe" estate (never badged as such) was almost unchanged apart from the side "Hunter" badges moving from the front doors to the front guards and revised seat and door trim patterns, and the door tops switched from black to the same colour as the seats. The alloy headed "super" saloon got these changes plus a redesigned 'by Chrysler' boot lid badge, spray-on black, instead of silver, tail panel — the texture of this changed from textured fake vinyl to a matte black over the year's run. Initially the cars were offered with tan, red, blue or black upholstery with the dash painted to match but after a few months, Todd's switched to a new type of vinyl with different colours and texture for their Avenger, Hunter and Valiant lines, the blue option was dropped and the dashboards reverted to black paint. By now the equivalent Super model in the UK had seen its specification reduced to the iron head engine, no bumper over-riders, less exterior bright metal detailing and fixed front quarterlights — so the New Zealand version was unique.

The range's first major facelift for 1972 brought an uprated motor with new carburettor and ignition tuning, re-profiled camshaft and a plastic air cleaner housing (these models were always harder to keep in tune than their predecessors), smaller, squarer headlamps, a new dashboard with deeply hooded round dials (the Hunters had strip speedometers previously), high-backed front seats, and a revised silver trim panel surrounding the tail lights. These models carried over the previous models' upholstery material and colours for about a year but there was a mid-1973 change to the then-new 'wet look' vinyl across all Kiwi assembled Chrysler/Hillman models and the Hunter shared the new cream, brown and blue colours, retaining black dashboards and interior plastics (UK cars had fully colour matched interiors in different colours with available cloth trim, a material Todd's would not introduce till the Hunter's final years).

Todds also added a new 1972 "GL" model, replacing the Singer Vogue, that initially had little to distinguish it (and justify a higher price) apart from wooden dashboard and door inserts, the same different trim patterns from the old Vogue and standard reversing lights. On all sedans, the rear Hunter badge moved from the right hand side of the boot lid to inboard of the left side tail lamp cluster and a locally sourced derivative badge appeared denoting "Super", "Super Auto" and "GL" variants (but not the available "GL Auto" which was badged just "GL"). In 1973 Todds created another completely unique model by updating the "GL" with a simplified variant of the four-headlight nose from the upmarket Humber Sceptre (a rare UK-assembled import) and altering the tail with a new silver strip below the tail lights, incorporating the reversing lights. These changes gave the "GL" a much more distinctive appearance front and rear.

By the mid-70s, the Hunter was an old model and under siege from newer Japanese rivals. Todd's Hunters adopted the larger bumpers and new grille introduced for 1975 in the UK but the range was eventually rationalised into a single Super saloon model with the four-headlight front end and "wood" dashboard inserts (by then it was synthetic wood rather than the real material used originally). The final updates included standard cigarette lighter and heater control illumination.

Around 1975, the optional automatic was uprated from the three-speed Borg Warner 35 to the new, four-speed 45 but there were supply problems and Todds reverted to the 35 three-speed for several assembly runs of the automatic versions.

As in Australia, though six years later, Mitsubishis from Japan sounded the Hunter's death knell. After beginning with CKD assembly of a single Galant coupé model in 1972, Todds had added the Lancer saloon in 1975 and launched its first mid-size Mitsubishi Galant Sigma saloon line in 1977, effectively replacing the Hunter. The far more modern, better equipped Mitsubishis were pricier, and the Hunter still had its fans and lingered on until 1979, when it was discontinued in the UK and Todd's built the last Chrysler-badged version anywhere.

The Hunter's other claim to Kiwi fame was being the first CKD model line to pass the 30,000-unit mark during its 12-year run.

=== South Africa ===
The Hunter and the Vogue were assembled locally in South Africa, beginning in 1968. The Vogue received Hillman badging, and the Hunter Deluxe model was sold as the "Hillman Arrow". Since local assembler Stanley Motors also assembled Peugeots, the Arrow cars received the 404's 1618 cc, 51 kW (68 hp) XC engine. This continued to be used until the end of South African production in mid-1977 (by Sigma for the last six months, Chrysler SA's successor company), although for 1976 the 504's 1971 cc 69 kW (93 hp) XN1 was available on the renamed Chrysler Vogue 2000. The Hunter Wagon was also locally assembled, this was renamed the "Hunter Safari" for 1972. The Arrow was dropped at the same time.

In 1975 the "Dodge Husky" was released as a Hunter-based pickup truck powered by the British 1725 cc unit. The Dodge Husky is different from the Iranian Paykan pickup model; it has a thicker B-pillar and retains the saloon's character lines along the side panels. The rear gate and rear window are also subtly different. For 1976, the Hillman name was dropped and the passenger car versions were renamed as Chrysler Vogues. The 2000 GL, GLS, and Safari received the larger Peugeot engine.

=== Iranian Paykan ===
In 1966, Iran National (now Iran Khodro) of Iran began to assemble Hillman Hunters from CKD kits, after a deal was struck between the Rootes Group and Iran National's director, Ahmad Khayami. The resulting Paykan (Persian for arrow) saloon, utility, and taxi models became known as Iran's national car.

Earlier versions used the Hunter 1,725 cc (105.3 cu in) engine, but later kits were shipped with the Avenger's 1600 cc engine mated to the Arrow range 4-speed gearbox via a special bell-housing. Later, they were all equipped with a 5-speed gearbox. The engine was changed to a Multi Point Electronic Fuel Injection made by the Sagem Company. The spark distributor was replaced with ECU-Controlled Spark Coils. The differential was also upgraded to a version more compatible with the Avenger engine.

In 1977 Roy Axe designed the new facelifted Paykan model using many interior and exterior parts from the Chrysler Alpine.

Full local production began in 1985, after the original British production lines were closed. The new owner in Britain, Peugeot, established a new contract whereby Iran Khodro would manufacture the Paykan with the same body panels but using Peugeot 504 engines and suspension, for six more years. This deal was similar to one in South Africa, where Hunters were once built with locally made Peugeot 404 engines (from which the 504 units evolved) to meet strict local-content laws applicable in the late 1960s.

The Paykan saloon ceased production in May 2005, to be replaced by the Iranian designed Samand. The Bardo 1600i, the pick-up version of the Paykan, continued to be the sole remaining Arrow variant until the final car rolled off the Teheran Assembly line in May 2015.

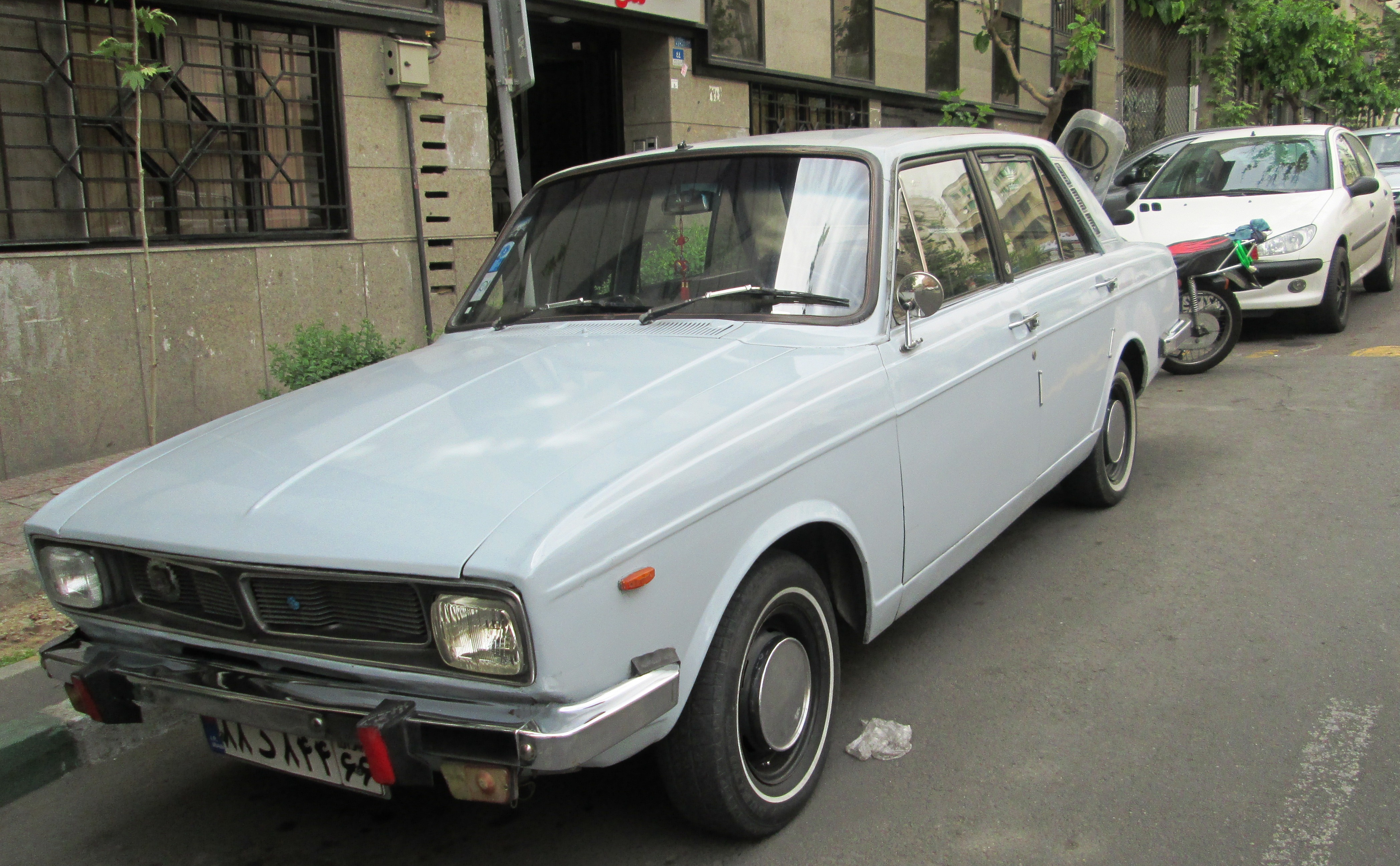
Paykan Iran National built, Tehran

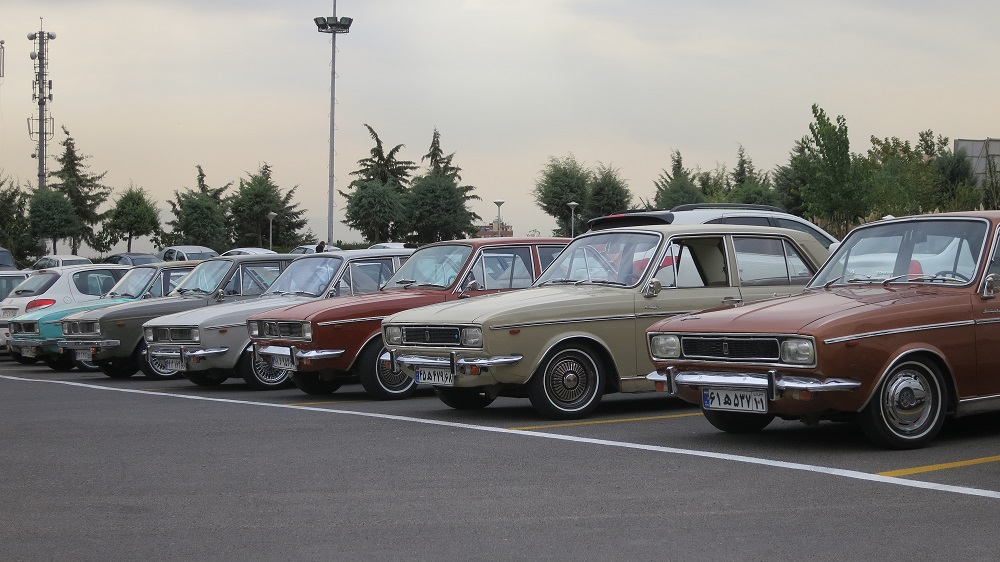
Paykan gathering in Northern Tehran

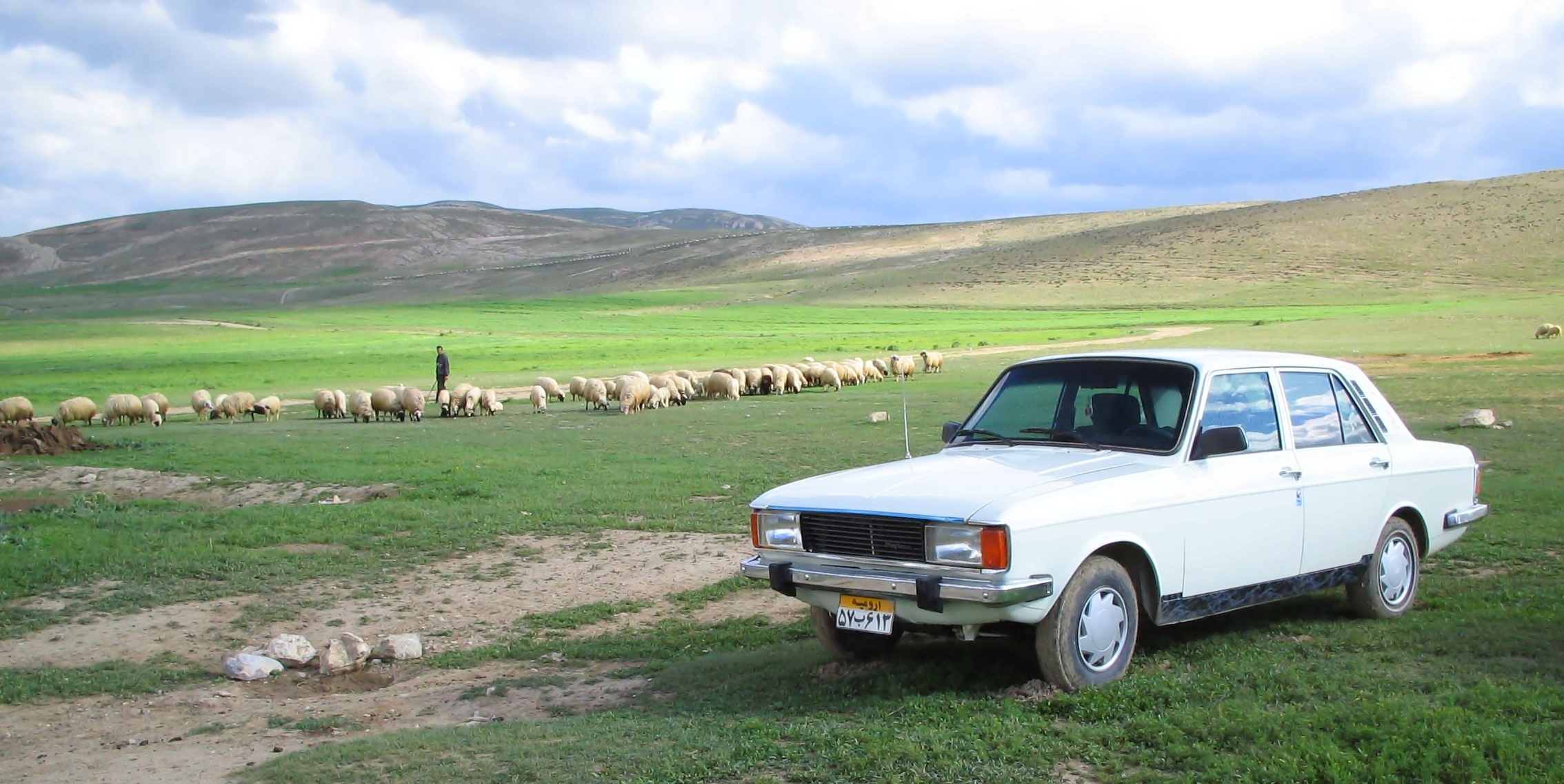
One of the last Paykans to be produced in Iran

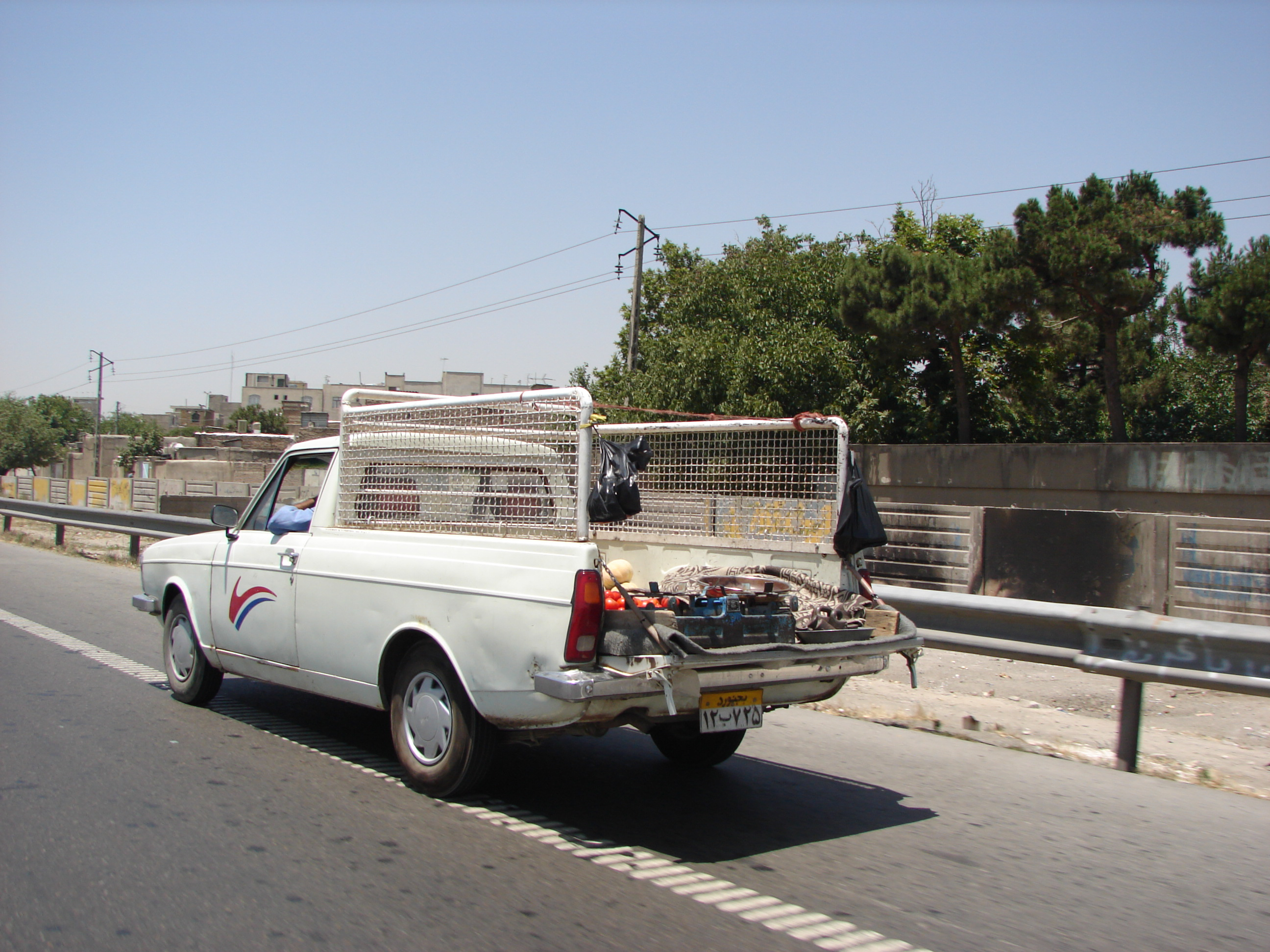
Paykan Pick-Up

=== Peru ===
The Hillman Hunter was also built by Chrysler in Peru, both in sedan and estate bodystyles.
