= 2004 London–Sydney Marathon =

2004 Marathon

- Host country: United Kingdom; Australia
- Rally base: London; Sydney
- Dates run: 5 June – 4 July 2004
- Stages: 55
- Stage surface: Tarmac and Gravel
- Overall distance: 15,000 km (9,300 miles)

Statistics
- Crews: 34 at start, 28 at finish

Overall results
- Overall winner: (New Zealand) Joe McAndrew (New Zealand) Murray Cole

The 2004 London–Sydney Marathon was the fifth running of the London–Sydney Marathon. The rally took place between 5 June and 4 July 2004. The event covered 9,300 miles (15,000 km) through Europe, Asia and Australia. It was won by Joe McAndrew and Murray Cole in a Honda Integra Type-R.

== Background ==
In 2004, Nick Brittan and his company, Trans World Events, who had organise long-distance endurance rallies for the last decade including the last two London–Sydney Marathons in 1993 and in 2000 decided to organise another London-Sydney Marathon but this time featuring pre-1978 classic cars and modern FIA Group N showroom cars, limited to two wheel drive and naturally aspirated engines up to 2000cc. The route would see competitors cross Europe in the first twelve days of the event before the cars would be airlifted by the Antonov An-124 cargo planes hired by TWE from Turkey to India with competitors driving through India for the next eight days before being airlifted to Australia for the last ten days of the rally.

== Results ==
Pos	Category	No	Drivers	Car	Overall Time
1	Modern Showroom	25	(New Zealand) Joe McAndrew (New Zealand) Murray Cole	Honda Integra Type-R	10hr 39min 39sec
2	Modern Showroom	37	(New Zealand) Mike Montgomery (New Zealand) Roy Wilson	Honda Integra Type-R	10hr 57min 30sec
3	Modern Showroom	34	(New Zealand) Shane Murland (New Zealand) John Benton	Honda Integra Type-R	11hr 9min 21sec
4	Modern Showroom	26	(New Zealand) Graham Lorimer (United Kingdom) Nick Starkey	Toyota RunX	11hr 13min 40sec
5	Modern Showroom	32	(New Zealand) Ian Begg (New Zealand) Allan Dippie	Toyota Corolla GT	11hr 27min 54sec
6	Classic	2	(United Kingdom) Anthony Ward (United Kingdom) Mark Solloway	Ford Escort RS 1600	11hr 28min 51sec
7	Modern Showroom	28	(United Kingdom) Steve Blunt (United Kingdom) Bob Duck	Toyota RunX	11hr 41min 7sec
8	Modern Showroom	35	(Australia) Brian Hilton (Australia) Joshua Hilton	Toyota Corolla GT	11hr 57min 42sec
9	Classic	16	(Australia) Peter Cochrane (Australia) Cameron Wearing	Ford Mustang	12hr 15min 10sec
10	Modern Showroom	36	(Australia) Peter Taylor (Australia) Trevor Stilling	Toyota Corolla GT	12hr 24min 22sec
11	Modern Showroom	27	(United Kingdom) Jimmy McRae (United Kingdom) Bruce Lyle	Toyota RunX	12hr 26min 43sec
12	Modern Showroom	39	(United Kingdom) David Winstanley (United Kingdom) Terri Metcalfe	MG ZR	12hr 27min 44sec
13	Classic	20	(Australia) Bob Almond (Australia) Paul Benko	Datsun 1800	12hr 34min 34sec
14	Classic	10	(Australia) Garry Leeson (Australia) Rex Leeson	Ford Falcon XR GT	12hr 40min 51sec
15	Modern Showroom	31	(Australia) Peter Lockhart (Australia) Moira Lockhart	Proton Satria GTi	12hr 42min 36sec
16	Classic	7	(Australia) David Cavenagh (United Kingdom) Cath Woodman	Porsche 911 Carrera	12hr 43min 44sec
17	Modern Showroom	29	(Norway) Vidar Christensen (Norway) Oddvar Moy	Peugeot 306 S-16	12hr 48min 42sec
18	Modern Showroom	33	(Australia) Steve Coad (Australia) Paul Wilson	Holden Astra	13hr 19min 24sec
19	Classic	15	(South Africa) Theo du Toit (South Africa) Andre Bezuidenhout	Porsche 911 S	13hr 22min 25sec
20	Classic	18	(Australia) Paul Darrouzet (Australia) Paul Williamson	Ford Capri Perana	13hr 25min 50sec
21	Classic	17	(Austria) Gerald Brandstetter (Austria) Helmut Artacker	Ford Escort RS 2000	14hr 1min 9sec
22	Classic	9	(South Africa) Franz Pretorius (South Africa) Roelof Coertse	Porsche 911	14hr 56min 50sec
23	Classic	19	(Czech Republic) Jiri Motal (Czech Republic) Ota Kramaz	Škoda 1100 MB	15hr 10min 13sec
24	Modern Showroom	38	(United Kingdom) Freddie Preston (United Kingdom) David Harrison	Suzuki Ignis Sport	15hr 27min 54sec
25	Classic	14	(Australia) Phil Hooper (United Kingdom) Terry Kingsley	Leyland P76	15hr 32min 15sec
26	Classic	12	(Australia) Lloyd Hughes (Australia) Hugh Hodgkinson	Porsche 911 S	16hr 10min 44sec
27	Classic	6	(Australia) Mark Laucke (Australia) Rosina Laucke	Porsche 911	16hr 19min 31sec
28	Classic	11	(United States) Chip Johns (United Kingdom) Jim Hurman	Ford Falcon Sprint	18hr 0min 2sec
