= 2000 London–Sydney Marathon =

- Host country: United Kingdom; Australia
- Rally base: London; Sydney
- Dates run: 3 June – 4 July 2000
- Stages: 58
- Stage surface: Tarmac and Gravel
- Overall distance: 16,000 km (9,900 miles)

Statistics
- Crews: 95 at start, 78 at finish

Overall results
- Overall winner: (Sweden) Stig Blomqvist (Australia) Ben Rainsford

The 2000 London–Sydney Marathon was the fourth running of the London–Sydney Marathon. The rally took place between 3 June and 4 July 2000. The event covered 10,000 miles (16,000 km) through Europe, Asia and Australia. It was won by Stig Blomqvist and Ben Rainsford in a Ford Capri Perana.

== Background ==
In 2000, Nick Brittan and his company, Trans World Events, who had organise the 1993 edition and other similar endurance events in the 1990s decided to organise another London–Sydney Marathon, once again featuring pre-1971 cars as the 'Millennium Celebration of the first epic event in 1968'. The 2000 edition would see former World Rally Champions Hannu Mikkola and Stig Blomqvist as well as former World Rally Championship Runner-Up Michèle Mouton and former Grand Prix winner Clay Regazzoni competing in the event. The route would see competitors cross Europe in the first fourteen days of the event before the cars would be airlifted by the Antonov An-124 cargo planes hired by TWE from Turkey to Thailand with competitors driving through Thailand and Malaysia for the next eight days before being airlifted to Australia for the last ten days of the rally.

== Results ==
Pos	No	Drivers	Car	Overall Time
1	3	(Sweden) Stig Blomqvist (Australia) Ben Rainsford	Ford Capri Perana	12hr 3min 51sec
2	6	(France) Michèle Mouton (United Kingdom) Francis Tuthill	Porsche 911	12hr 9min 17sec
3	4	(Australia) Rick Bates (Australia) Jenny Brittan	Porsche 911	12hr 13min 35sec
4	54	(Australia) Simon Lingford (Australia) David Moir	Datsun 240Z	13hr 4min 50sec
5	27	(United Kingdom) Andrew Haddon (United Kingdom) Mark Solloway	Ford Escort RS 1600	13hr 7min 16sec
6	5	(Austria) Willi Polesznig (Austria) Wolfgang Viakowsky	Porsche 911	13hr 9min 18sec
7	7	(Australia) Pat Cole (Australia) David Callaghan	Mercedes-Benz 280 SL	13hr 11min 30sec
8	15	(United Kingdom) Ray Bellm (United Kingdom) Pasquale Lanzante	Porsche 911	13hr 18min 50sec
9	10	(Austria) Josef Pointinger (Austria) Wolfgang Nolscher	Ford Escort Mark I	13hr 22min 4sec
10	2	(Australia) Terry Daly (New Zealand) Bob Brill	Ford Mustang	13hr 24min 30sec
11	47	(United Kingdom) Michael Cotter (Australia) Warren Ridge	Datsun 240Z	13hr 27min 26sec
12	24	(United Kingdom) Peter Hall (United Kingdom) Mary Hall	Ford Escort Mark I	13hr 30min 59sec
13	9	(United Kingdom) Olly Clark (United Kingdom) Damon Harvey	Ford Escort BDA	13hr 31min 33sec
14	31	(United Kingdom) John Hills (Australia) David Hills	Ford Escort Mark I	13hr 43min 19sec
15	16	(United Kingdom) Richard Martin-Hurst (New Zealand) Tony Devantier	Ford Capri Perana	13hr 43min 49sec
16	50	(United Kingdom) Robin Stainer (Australia) Mike Burleigh	Datsun 240Z	13hr 44min 48sec
17	58	(United Kingdom) Paul Merryweather (United Kingdom) Marc Tipping	Mercedes-Benz 250/8	13hr 46min 31sec
18	67	(Australia) John Rudajs (Australia) Rex Growden	Ford Falcon XT	13hr 47min 21sec
19	19	(Australia) Stewart Wilkins (United Kingdom) David Lowe	Datsun 240Z	13hr 47min 56sec
20	89	(United Kingdom) Andrew Pidden (United Kingdom) Nick Fennell	Datsun 240Z	13hr 48min 38sec
21	73	(South Africa) Pieter Coetzee (South Africa) Derek Urquhart	Porsche 911	13hr 49min 1sec
22	63	(New Zealand) Alastair Caldwell (New Zealand) Stuart McFarlane	Mercedes-Benz 280 SL	13hr 49min 13sec
23	72	(Australia) Lambros Kouriefs (Germany) Sylvia Kouriefs	Datsun 1600	13hr 49min 42sec
24	13	(Australia) John Fisher (Australia) Malcolm Rossiter	Porsche 911L	13hr 52min 0sec
25	32	(United Kingdom) Richard Horwell (United Kingdom) Ian Winter	Porsche 911	13hr 54min 11sec
26	85	(Czech Republic) Jiri Kotek (Czech Republic) Jiri Sedivy	Škoda 1100 MB	14hr 1min 21sec
27	1	(Finland) Hannu Mikkola (Finland) Juha Mikkola	Ford Escort Mark I	14hr 5min 20sec
28	42	(Australia) Phil Hooper (Australia) Lina Hooper	Datsun 240Z	14hr 6min 0sec
29	14	(Australia) Gary Fitzgerald (Australia) Tony Kitamura	Datsun 240Z	14hr 7min 41sec
30	41	(United Kingdom) Stephen Bicknell (United Kingdom) Chris Clarkson	Ford Escort Mark I	14hr 11min 55sec
31	55	(United Kingdom) Derek Parling (United Kingdom) Ian North	Volvo 123 GT	14hr 11min 59sec
32	56	(Australia) Garry Leeson (Australia) Rex Leeson	Ford Falcon XW GT	14hr 13min 28sec
33	88	(Australia) Howard Laughton (Australia) Philip Lalor	Mercedes-Benz 280 CE	14hr 13min 42sec
34	39	(Australia) Noel Delforce (Australia) Richard Macey	Ford Falcon	14hr 27min 51sec
35	28	(South Africa) Roger Pearce (South Africa) Dorian Radue	MG MGB GT	14hr 29min 56sec
36	92	(United Kingdom) Anthony Ward (United Kingdom) David Harris	Ford Cortina GT	14hr 32min 27sec
37	48	(Austria) Ernst Harrach (Germany) Michael Kolbach	Peugeot 504	14hr 35min 11sec
38	66	(South Africa) Johann Vorster (South Africa) Romando Duminy	Porsche 911	14hr 39min 9sec
39	84	(Czech Republic) Josef Michl (Czech Republic) Marek Simik	Škoda 1100 MB	14hr 41min 6sec
40	65	(Australia) Bob Almond (Australia) Alf Barbara	Datsun 180B	14hr 42min 15sec
41	25	(United Kingdom) Miles Pearce (United Kingdom) Jon Roebuck	Ford Cortina GT	14hr 43min 17sec
42	64	(Australia) Alan Cameron (Australia) Ted Rogers	Holden Torana	14hr 58min 26sec
43	57	(Australia) Stewart Lamb (Australia) Cameron Wearing	Ford Falcon XT	14hr 59min 53sec
44	69	(Australia) Graham Rich (Australia) Iain Mason	Ford Mustang	15hr 7min 10sec
45	43	(United Kingdom) David Smithies (United Kingdom) Eric Woolley	Ford Escort Mark I	15hr 13min 26sec
46	62	(Australia) Peter Cochrane (Australia) Duncan Richter	Ford Mustang	15hr 17min 27sec
47	44	(United Kingdom) Andrew Gorrod (Australia) George Reynolds	Volvo 144S	15hr 21min 31sec
48	87	(Australia) Dennis O'Neill (Australia) Robert McKenzie	Mazda RX-2	15hr 26min 9sec
49	38	(Germany) Gunther Stamm (Germany) Corinna Stamm	Ford Mustang	15hr 28min 30sec
50	70	(United Kingdom) John Leppard (United Kingdom) Nick Starkey	Peugeot 504	15hr 35min 18sec
51	26	(Australia) Richard Anderson (Australia) Keith Callinan	Alfa Romeo Giulia	15hr 41min 26sec
52	68	(Australia) Hugh Savage (Australia) George Falkiner	Porsche 911	15hr 41min 42sec
53	60	(South Africa) Theo du Toit (South Africa) Johan Swiegers	Porsche 911	15hr 43min 5sec
54	46	(Australia) Trevor Eastwood (Australia) David Hartley	Holden Monaro GTS	15hr 46min 13sec
55	8	(United Kingdom) Indey Singh-Milkhu (United Kingdom) Jeet Singh-Milkhu	Volvo 142	15hr 47min 10sec
56	51	(United Kingdom) Graham Samuel (United Kingdom) Tony Phillips	Porsche 911	15hr 58min 48sec
57	76	(Australia) John Stevens (Australia) Gaynor Stevens	Ford Falcon	16hr 2min 27sec
58	94	(Italy) Marco Cajani (Italy) Marco Rossi	Alfa Romeo Giulia TI Super	16hr 9min 43sec
59	90	(United Kingdom) Dennis Greenslade (United Kingdom) Roger Bricknell	Volvo 144S	16hr 15min 41sec
60	83	(Germany) Henry Koster (Germany) Tina Koster	MG MGB	16hr 18min 16sec
61	78	(Australia) Charlie Mitchell (Australia) Stuart Kostera	Holden Kingswood	16hr 35min 32sec
62	34	(United Kingdom) Ian James (United Kingdom) Richard French	BMW 2002	16hr 41min 28sec
63	52	(Australia) Michael Corbett (Australia) Peter Burrey	Alfa Romeo GTV	16hr 42min 40sec
64	93	(United Kingdom) Peter Woodward (Italy) Lorenzo Paesano	Range Rover 2WD	16hr 49min 41sec
65	49	(Australia) Gordon Ketelbey (Australia) Kim Ketelbey	Ford Mustang	16hr 59min 8sec
66	29	(United Kingdom) Tony King (Australia) Neil Goodwin	Hillman Hunter	17hr 7min 7sec
67	95	(United Kingdom) Christopher Yates (United Kingdom) Tom Grace	Volvo Amazon	17hr 33min 27sec
68	36	(United Kingdom) Ronald Rogers (United Kingdom) Joe Hall	Ford Escort Mexico	17hr 40min 27sec
69	91	(United Kingdom) Chris Underwood (United Kingdom) Peter Stimson	Ford Cortina GT	17hr 49min 18sec
70	74	(United Kingdom) John Spiers (United Kingdom) Paul Rothwell	Ford Mustang	17hr 58min 49sec
71	79	(South Africa) Steve Pickering (South Africa) Craig Hopson	Porsche 914/6	18hr 5min 13sec
72	75	(United Kingdom) Gareth Williams (United Kingdom) John O'Connor	Ford Escort Mark I	18hr 7min 1sec
73	71	(United Kingdom) Bob Norkett (United Kingdom) Ray Abbs	Ford Cortina Mark I	18hr 13min 26sec
74	77	(Australia) John Hamilton (Australia) Henry Jennings	Hillman Hunter	18hr 24min 7sec
75	40	(Australia) Joe Caudo (Australia) Ivan Limb	Citroën SM	18hr 32min 57sec
76	35	(United Kingdom) Jane James (United Kingdom) Bob Stokoe	Volvo 142	19hr 41min 46sec
77	45	(United Kingdom) Peter Finnigan (United Kingdom) James Finnigan	Ford Cortina GT	20hr 5min 48sec
78	33	(United Kingdom) David Long (United Kingdom) Robert Pepper	Ford Mustang	20hr 46min 58sec
