= London–Sydney Marathon =

Car rally from the United Kingdom to Australia

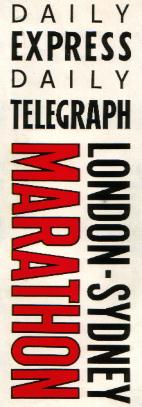
The banner for the original London-Sydney Marathon

The London–Sydney Marathon was a car rally from the United Kingdom to Australia. It was first run in 1968, a second event by the same organizers was run in 1977 and a third in 1993 to commemorate the 25th anniversary of the original. Three further rallies have subsequently been contested in 2000, 2004 and 2014.

The 1968 event inspired different organisers to create the 1970 London to Mexico World Cup Rally, the 1974 London-Sahara-Munich World Cup Rally and the Dakar Rally.

The original 1968 event was won by Andrew Cowan, Colin Malkin and Brian Coyle, driving a Hillman Hunter. Fifty-six cars finished.

== 1968 ==
=== Background ===
The original Marathon was the result of a lunch in late 1967, during a period of despondency in Britain caused by the devaluation of the pound. Sir Max Aitken, proprietor of the Daily Express and two of his editorial executives, Jocelyn Stevens and Tommy Sopwith, decided to create an event which their newspaper could sponsor, and which would serve to raise the country's spirits. Such an event would, it was felt, act as a showcase for British engineering and would boost export sales in the countries through which it passed.

The initial UK£10,000 winner's prize offered by the Daily Express was soon joined by a £3,000 runners-up award and two £2,000 prizes for the third-placed team and for the highest-placed Australians, all of which were underwritten by the Daily Telegraph newspaper and its proprietor Frank Packer, who was eager to promote the Antipodean leg of the rally.

=== The route ===
An eight-man organising committee was established to create a suitably challenging but navigable route. Jack Sears, organising secretary and himself a former racing driver, plotted a 7,000 miles (11,000 km) course covering eleven countries in as many days, and arranged that the P&O liner SS Chusan would ferry the first 72 cars and their crews on the nine-day voyage from India, before the final 2,600 miles (4,200 km) across Australia:

Europe and Asia
Leg	Date	Start	Finish	Allowed time	Description
1	24–25 November	London	Paris	12h 32m	23:00 depart Crystal Palace; 04:00 depart England at Dover on the English Channel ferry to France; 11:32 arrive Le Bourget Airport
2	25–26 November	Paris	Turin	13h 32m	To Italy via the Mont Blanc Tunnel; 00:52 arrive Turin
3	26 November	Turin	Belgrade	21h 12m	Autostrada towards Venice before crossing into Yugoslavia; 22:04 arrive Belgrade
4	26–27 November	Belgrade	Istanbul	15h 31m	Through Bulgaria by night into Turkey; 13:35 arrive Istanbul
5	27–28 November	Istanbul	Sivas	12h 25m	Crossing the Bosphorus by ferry, through Ankara and the Bolu Pass; 03:00 arrive Sivas
6	28 November	Sivas	Erzincan	2h 45m	Heading east across unsurfaced roads; 04:45 Erzincan
7	28–29 November	Erzincan	Tehran	22h 01m	Cross border into Iran; 02:46 arrive Tehran
8	29–30 November	Tehran	Kabul	23h 33m	Follow one of two routes to Islam Qala in Afghanistan, either the northerly route across the Alburz Mountains skirting the southern shores of the Caspian Sea, or the shorter but more treacherous route along the north edge of the Great Salt Desert; 02:19 arrive Kabul, where timeous crews can enjoy a 6.5-hour rest before the Khyber Pass opens
9	30 November	Kabul	Sarobi	1h 00m	08:42 depart Kabul across an obsolete, loose-surfaced road through the Lataband Pass; 09:42 arrive Sarobi.
10	30 November – 1 December	Sarobi	Delhi	17h 55m	Cross Pakistan in a day into India; 03:37 arrive Delhi
11	1–2 December	Delhi	Bombay	22h 51m	Pass through Agra and Indore; 02:28 arrive Bombay

The remaining crews departed Bombay at 03:00 on 5 December, arriving in Fremantle at 10:00 on 13 December before they restarted in Perth the following evening. Any repairs attempted on the car during the voyage would lead to the crew's exclusion.

Australia
Leg	Date	Start	Finish	Allowed time	Description
12	14–15 December	Perth	Youanmi	7h 00m	Depart 18:00 from Gloucester Park, traversing smooth but unsurfaced road; 01:00 arrive deserted mining town of Youanmi
13	15 December	Youanmi	Marvel Loch	4h 03m	Through semi-desert via Diemal to asphalt road at Bullfinch; 05:03 arrive Marvel Loch
14	15 December	Marvel Loch	Lake King	1h 59m	Into the Nullarbor Plain; 07:02 arrive Lake King
15	15 December	Lake King	Ceduna	14h 52m	21:54 arrive Ceduna
16	15–16 December	Ceduna	Quorn	6h 18m	04:12 arrive Quorn
17	16 December	Quorn	Moralana Creek	1h 17m	05:29 arrive Moralana Creek
18	16 December	Moralana Creek	Brachina	1h 30m	06:59 arrive Brachina
19	16 December	Brachina	Mingary	4h 10m	11:09 arrive Mingary
20	16 December	Mingary	Menindee	2h 12m	13:29 arrive Menindee
21	16 December	Menindee	Gunbar	5h 18m	18:39 arrive Gunbar
22	16 December	Gunbar	Edi	4h 26m	23:05 arrive Edi
23	16–17 December	Edi	Brookside	1h 00m	00:05 arrive Brookside
24	17 December	Brookside	Omeo	1h 55m	02:00 arrive Omeo
25	17 December	Omeo	Murrindal	2h 06m	04:06 arrive Murrindal
26	17 December	Murrindal	Ingebyra	1h 31m	05:37 arrive Ingebyra
27	17 December	Ingebyra	Numeralla	1h 29m	07:06 arrive Numeralla
28	17 December	Numeralla	Hindmarsh Station	0h 42m	07:48 arrive Hindmarsh Station
29	17 December	Hindmarsh Station	Nowra	2h 01m	09:49 arrive Nowra
30	17 December	Nowra	Warwick Farm Racecourse	3h 30m	13:19 arrive Warwick Farm Racecourse
31	18 December	Warwick Farm Racecourse	Sydney		Arrive in procession, Sydney

=== Result ===
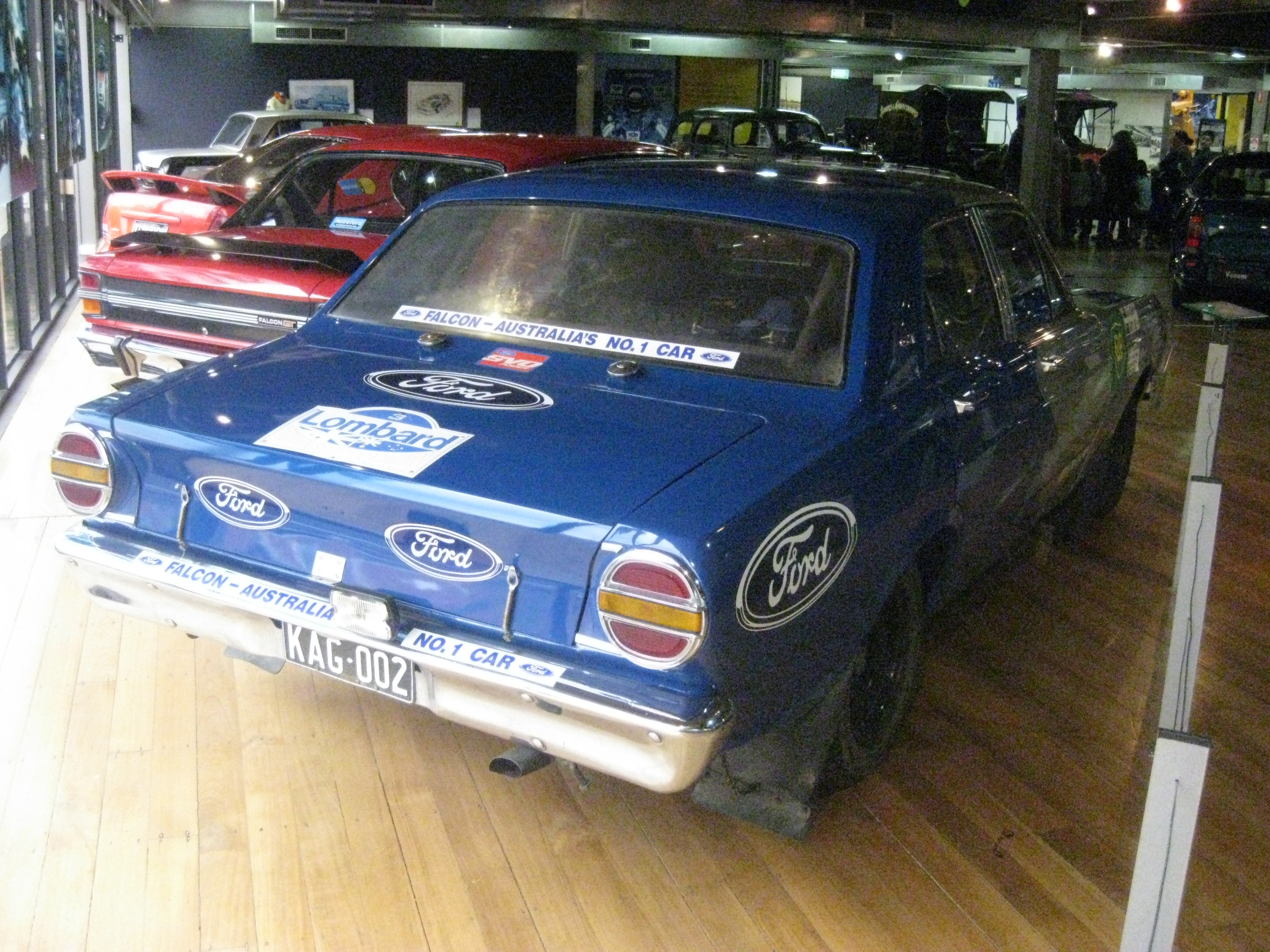
The Ford XT Falcon GT which placed 3rd in the 1968 Marathon

Roger Clark established an early lead through the first genuinely treacherous leg, from Sivas to Erzincan in Turkey, averaging almost 60 mph (100 km/h) in his Lotus Cortina for the 170 miles (270 km) stage. Despite losing time in Pakistan and India, he maintained his lead to the end of the Asian section in Bombay, with Simo Lampinen's Ford Taunus second and Lucien Bianchi's Citroën DS in third.

However, once into Australia, Clark suffered several setbacks. A piston failure dropped him to third, and would have cost him a finish had he not been able to cannibalise fellow Ford driver Eric Jackson's car for parts. After repairs were effected, he suffered what should have been a terminal rear differential failure. Encountering a Cortina by the roadside, he persuaded the initially reluctant owner to sell his rear axle and resumed once more, although at the cost of 80 minutes' delay while it was replaced.

This left Lucien Bianchi and co-driver Jean-Claude Ogier in the Citroën DS in the lead ahead of Gilbert Staepelaere/Simo Lampinen in the German Ford Taunus, with Andrew Cowan in the Hillman Hunter 3rd. Then Staepelaere's Taunus hit a gate post, breaking a track rod. This left Cowan in second position and Paddy Hopkirk's Austin 1800 in third place. Approaching the Nowra checkpoint at the end of the penultimate stage with only 98 miles (158 km) to Sydney, the Frenchmen were involved in a head-on collision with a motorist who mistakenly entered a closed course, wrecking their Citroën DS and hospitalising the pair.

Hopkirk, the first driver on the scene (ahead of Cowan on the road, but behind on penalties) stopped to tend to the injured and extinguish the flames in the burning cars. Andrew Cowan, next on the scene, also slowed but was waved through with the message that everything was under control. Hopkirk rejoined the rally, and neither he nor Cowan lost penalties in this stage. So Andrew Cowan, who had requested "a car to come last" from the Chrysler factory on the assumption that only half a dozen drivers would even reach Sydney, took victory in his Hillman Hunter and claimed the £10,000 prize. Hopkirk finished second, while Australian Ian Vaughan was third in a factory-entered Ford XT Falcon GT. Ford Australia won the Teams' Prize with their three Falcons GTs, placing 3rd, 6th and 8th.

== 1977 ==
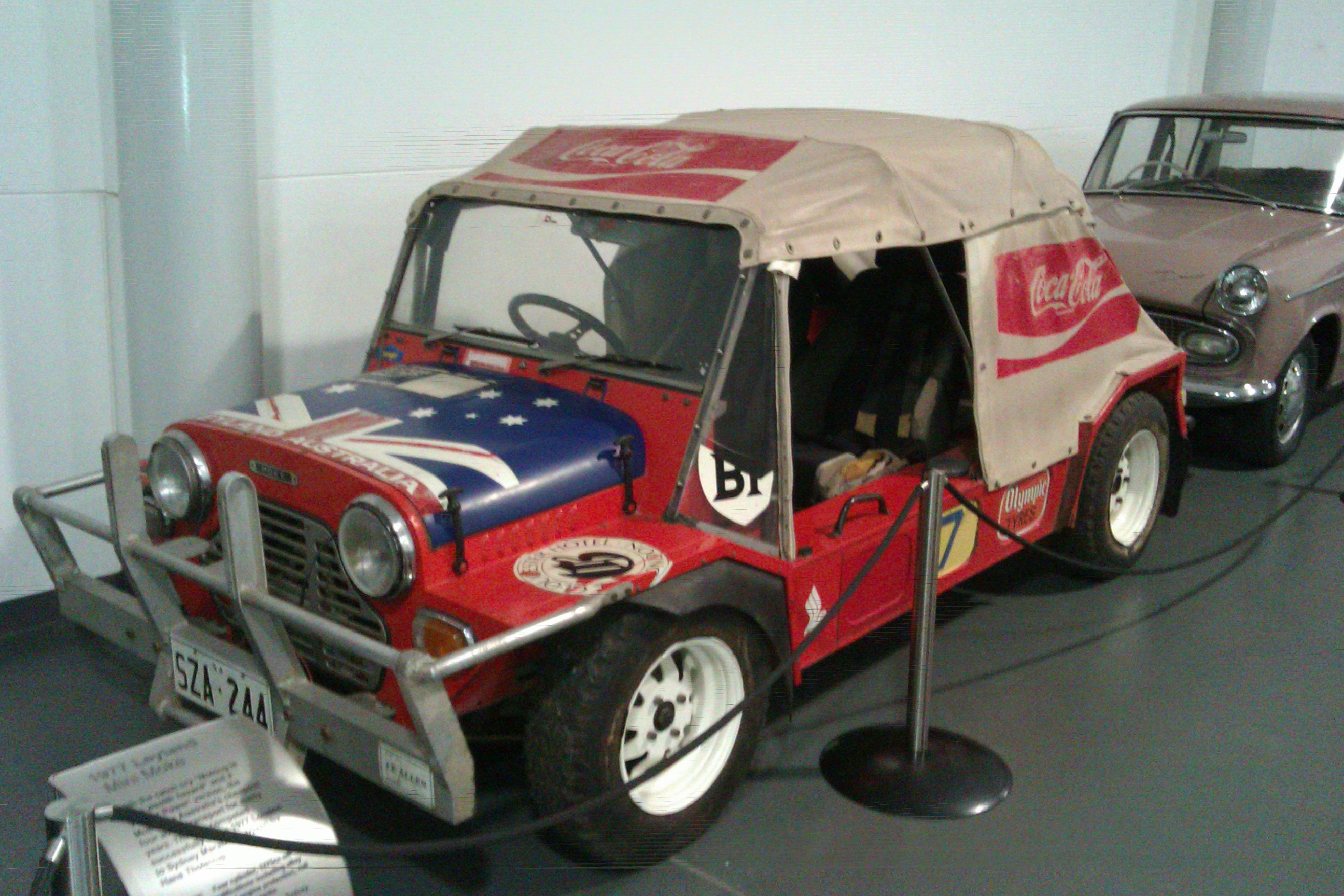
The Leyland Moke in which Hans Tholstrup and John Crawford placed 35th in the 1977 Singapore Airlines London to Sydney Rally

The success of the 1968 marathon spawned the World Cup rallies, although after the controversial 1974 event, no further World Cup event would be held. While the original event was to prove a triumph for the Rootes Group, the 1977 edition, this time sponsored by Singapore Airlines, was dominated by Mercedes-Benz. The German marque claimed a 1–2 finish and had two other cars in the top eight, with Andrew Cowan in a 280E repeating his success of nine years previous, followed home by teammate Tony Fowkes in a similar car. Paddy Hopkirk, this time driving a Citroën CX, took the final podium spot.

== 1993 ==
Nick Brittan, a competitor in the original event in a Lotus Cortina, established his company as an organiser of modern endurance rallies with a 25th anniversary re-run of the marathon in 1993. He persuaded 21 drivers who had competed in 1968 to return, including Andrew Cowan and Roger Clark, and altogether 106 teams from 17 countries entered. Cowan drove the same car as the first time, having his Hillman Hunter loaned to him by the Scottish Automobile Club museum, while other competitors drove pre-1970 era cars. The entry fee was £12,900, and the estimated cost of participating was put at £45,000.

The 16,000 km rally had three major differences to its ancestor. First, the changing political climate in the Middle East meant that several countries such as Iran and Afghanistan were now out of bounds, although in Europe, Turkey and Australia much of the original route was retraced. Also, the old scheduled open road sections were replaced with more modern timed special stages for safety reasons. Finally, with the demise of the great passenger liners there would be no great voyage across the Indian Ocean to Australia, Brittan instead negotiating for two Antonov An-124 cargo planes to take the vehicles to Australia.

The winning driver was Francis Tuthill in a Porsche 911, ahead of the Ford Falcon GT of Ian Vaughan who finished third in 1968. Kenya's Mike Kirkland, a stalwart of the Safari Rally, took the final place on the podium in a Peugeot 504.

== 2000 ==
A second rerun was organised in 2000 as a "Millennium celebration of [the] first epic event." Again, much of Asia was inaccessible for political reasons, with two airlifts instead of the single one of 1993. Now, after crossing Europe and Turkey in the first fourteen days, the competitors would be loaded on to the Antonovs for the trip to northern Thailand, driving south through the country and into Malaysia for twelve days before being flown to Australia for the last eight days of the rally.

Of the 100 starters who left London 78 reached Sydney, with Stig Blomqvist and Ben Rainsford scoring victory ahead of Michèle Mouton in a Porsche 911, whose co-driver was 1993 winner Francis Tuthill. Rick Bates and Jenny Brittan in another 911 took third.

== 2004 ==
The third re-run was a combination of modern Group N (showroom-class) cars, and pre-1977 classics, all limited to two wheel drive and a sub-two-litre engine. New Zealand, in tandem with Lincolnshire, England race-preparation specialists Langworth Motorsport, scored a 1–2–3 podium clean sweep with three Kiwi-piloted Honda Integras; overall winners Joe McAndrew and Murray Cole, runners-up Mike Montgomery and Roy Wilson, and Shane Murland and John Benton in third. The highest-placed classic car was a Ford Escort RS1600 driven by Anthony Ward and Mark Solloway, which finished sixth overall.

== 2014 ==
Ten years later a sixth Marathon was run. Differing from its five predecessors it was run in the reverse direction, starting in Sydney and travelling to London with an airlift linking the west coast of Australia to Turkey.

== Winners by year ==
Year	Event	Winner	Vehicle
1968	Daily Express London–Sydney Marathon	(United Kingdom) Andrew Cowan	Hillman Hunter
1977	Singapore Airlines Rally	(United Kingdom) Andrew Cowan	Mercedes-Benz 280E
1993	Lombard London–Sydney Marathon	(United Kingdom) Francis Tuthill	Porsche 911
2000	London–Sydney Marathon	(Sweden) Stig Blomqvist	Ford Capri
2004	London–Sydney Marathon	(New Zealand) Joe McAndrew	Honda Integra Type-R
2014	The Big One Sydney–London Classic Marathon Rally	(Australia) Geoff Olholm	Datsun 260Z
