= 1969 Rothmans 12 Hour Classic =

Coordinates: 28°0′59″S 153°22′34″E

The 1969 Rothmans 12 Hour Classic was an endurance motor race for production cars held at the Surfers Paradise International Raceway in Queensland, Australia on 5 January 1969. It was the first of two such races to be held at the circuit.

The race was won by Bill Gates and Jim Bertram driving a Ford XT Falcon GT.

== Classes ==
Cars competed in five classes based on the retail price of the vehicle in Australian Dollars.

== Results ==
Position	Drivers	No.	Car	Entrant	Laps
	Outright Winner				
	Bill Gates, Jim Bertram	16	Ford XT Falcon GT	McCluskey Ford	427
	Class A : Up to $1850				
1	B Tapsall, R Sorensen, R Gibson	62	Datsun 1000	Datsun Racing Team	404
2	W Scott, E Olsen	66	Toyota Corolla	W Scott	392
3	W Evans, J Cosworth	61	Datsun 1000	Datsun Racing Team	383
4	T Floyd, P Wherrett, A Vincent	65	Toyota Corolla	MTR Services	368
5		64	Toyota Corolla	MTR Services	359
6	Noel Riley, Ken Brian	63	Honda Scamp	Team Honda	334
	Class B : $1851 to $2250				
1	John Roxburgh, Doug Whiteford	54	Datsun 1600	Datsun Racing Team	415
2	W Coad, F Sutherland	53	Datsun 1600	Datsun Racing Team	411
3	P Lefrancke, R Skelton, B Reed	57	Toyota Corolla SL	Farsley Motors	404
4	A Whitchurch, T Gilltrap	58	Datsun 1600	Coolangatta Tweed Heads Car Club	403
5		55	Hillman Gazelle	Eiffel Tower Motors	403
6		49	Datsun 1600	MTR Services	381
7	Edgerton	49	Renault R10	Robert Edgerton	375
DISQ	Wooton, Morrow	52	Datsun 1600	McInnes Auto Conversions	
	Class C : $2251 to $3000				
1	Garry Hodge, John Leffler	42	Morris Cooper S	Denis Geary Motors	426
2	John Smailes, John Millyard	35	Morris Cooper S	Martinz Place	421
3	T Basile, F Leggatt	31	Fiat 125	Tony Basile Motors	414
4	J Eiffeltower, D O'Keefe	39	Hillman Hunter GT	Eiffeltower Motors	413
5	Gracie	32	Morris Cooper S	W.R. Gracie	409
6	Cooke, Brewster, Hindmarsh	41	Morris Cooper S	Marque Motors	404
7	Haylen (?)	33	Morris Cooper S	Grand Prix Auto Service	374
DNF	Joe Camilleri, John Humphries	?	Morris Cooper S		
DNF	Ian Kenny, Hans Marquard	?	Morris Cooper S		
DSQ	John Goss, John Cooke	37 or 38	Holden HK Kingswood	The High Performance School	
DSQ	Bill Tuckey, Sib Petralia	37 or 38	Hullman Hunter GT	The High Performance School	
	Class D : $3001 to $4500				
1	Bill Gates, John Bertram	16	Ford XT Falcon GT	McCluskey Ford	427
2	Glyn Scott, Keith Williams	25	Holden HK Monaro GTS327	Glyn Scott Motors	420
3	R Jones, R Forbes, D West	21	Fiat 124S Coupe	Nanda Marcaroni Products	413
4	G Trebilcock, N Trebilcock, H Woelders	22	BMW 1600	Gerry Trebilcock	411
5	Lionel Ayers, Max Volkers	18	Ford XT Falcon GT	Central Auto Sales	405
6	Seldon, Kearns	23	Volvo 144	British & Continental	355
7	Denis Geary, Bill Brown	19	Holden HK Monaro GTS327	Denis Geary Motors	310
8	Bruce McPhee, Doug Chivas	13	Holden HK Monaro GTS327	Bruce McPhee	245
DNF	Paul Zacka, Graham Perry	?	Holden HK Monaro GTS327		
	Class E : Over $4500				
1	Kevin Bartlett, John French	1	Alfa Romeo 1750 GTV	Alec Mildren Pty. Ltd.	424
2	R Gulson, P Brown	2	Alfa Romeo 1750 GTV	Canberra Speed Shop	408
3	Ivan Tighe, B Schuster	5	Citroen DS21	Glyn Scott Motors	349
