= 1993 London–Sydney Marathon =

1993 London–Sydney Marathon Lombard London–Sydney Marathon
- Host country: United Kingdom; Australia
- Rally base: London; Sydney
- Dates run: 17 April – 16 May 1993
- Stages: 44
- Stage surface: Tarmac and Gravel
- Overall distance: 16,000 km (9,900 miles)

Statistics
- Crews: 106 at start, 86 at finish

Overall results
- Overall winner: (United Kingdom) Francis Tuthill (United Kingdom) Anthony Showell

The 1993 London–Sydney Marathon, officially Lombard London–Sydney Marathon was the third running of the London–Sydney Marathon. The rally took place between 17 April and 16 May 1993. The event covered 10,000 miles (16,000 km) through Europe, Asia and Australia. It was won by Francis Tuthill and Anthony Showell in a Porsche 911.

== Background ==
Nick Brittan, who was a competitor in the original event in 1968, decided to organise a modern London to Sydney Marathon featuring pre-1970 cars to commemorate the 25th anniversary of the original event being held in 1968 through his company, Trans World Events, who would go on to organise similar endurance events over the next decade. He managed to persuaded 25 of the original 1968 competitors to take part in the 1993 event which included the 1968 winner, Andrew Cowan, who had the Hillman Hunter that he won the 1968 event in, on loan to him by the Scottish Automobile Club Museum and former British Rally Champion Roger Clark. The route would see competitors cross Europe and Asia in the first eleven days of the event before the cars would be airlifted from Turkey to India with competitors driving through the country for the next seven days before being airlifted to Australia for the last ten days of the rally. The event was to have three major differences comparing to the original event in 1968. Firstly, the changing political climate in the Middle East meant that several countries such as Iran and Afghanistan were now out of bounds, although in Europe, Turkey and Australia much of the original route was retraced from the original. Secondly, the old scheduled open road sections would be replaced with more modern timed special stages for safety reasons. Finally, with the demise of the great passenger liners there would be no great voyage across the Indian Ocean from India to Australia, Brittan and TWE instead hired two Antonov An-124 cargo planes to take the vehicles from India to Australia.

== Results ==
Pos	No	Drivers	Car	Penalties (Time)
1	51	(United Kingdom) Francis Tuthill (United Kingdom) Anthony Showell	Porsche 911	13hr 36min 11sec
2	3	(Australia) Ian Vaughan (Australia) Barry Lake	Ford Falcon XT GT	13hr 50min 31sec
3	66	(Kenya) Mike Kirkland (United Kingdom) Crispin Sassoon	Peugeot 504	13hr 58min 10sec
4	2	(United Kingdom) Roger Clark (United Kingdom) Tony Moy	Ford Escort Mark I	13hr 58min 42sec
5	64	(United Kingdom) Graham Lorimer (New Zealand) Gary Smith	Ford Escort Mark I	13hr 59min 32sec
6	49	(United Kingdom) Colin Short (United Kingdom) Nick Starkey	Ford Escort Mark I	14hr 10min 28sec
7	77	(Kenya) David Horsey (United Kingdom) Michael Kearns	Peugeot 504	14hr 11min 28sec
8	22	(Australia) Bruce Hodgson (Australia) Ronald Lawton	Ford Falcon XT GT	14hr 14min 23sec
9	45	(Australia) Dean Rainsford (Australia) Ben Rainsford	Ford Mustang	14hr 18min 10sec
10	78	(Australia) Steve Ashton (Australia) Dr. Rosemary Nixon	Datsun P510	14hr 21min 35sec
11	26	(Australia) Richard Anderson (Australia) Michael Ryan	Alfa Romeo Giulia	14hr 35min 7sec
12	10	(France) Patrick Vanson (France) Bernard Consten	Peugeot 504	14hr 48min 7sec
13	7	(Australia) Evan Green (Australia) Gavin Green	Ford Escort Mark I	14hr 59min 35sec
14	105	(Australia) Philip Hooper (Australia) Adrian Stafford	Porsche 911 S	15hr 17min 39sec
15	88	(Australia) Howard Laughton (Australia) Keith Carling	Mercedes-Benz 280 SE	15hr 41min 6sec
16	48	(Australia) Bob Almond (Australia) Lance Fisher	Datsun 1600	15hr 41min 35sec
17	57	(Australia) Ross Alexander (Australia) John Garathy	Holden Monaro	15hr 52min 9sec
18	47	(Australia) George Bevan (Australia) Graeme Furness	Volvo 144S	16hr 0min 11sec
19	99	(Austria) Franz Stangl (South Africa) Stanley Illman	Porsche 911	16hr 3min 41sec
20	44	(United Kingdom) Howard Paterson (United Kingdom) Ian North	Volvo Amazon	16hr 27min 34sec
21	23	(United Kingdom) Peter Sugden (United Kingdom) Stuart McCrudden	Ford Cortina Mark II	16hr 31min 53sec
22	91	(United Kingdom) Roger Ealand (Australia) Margaret Ealand	Volvo 123 GT	16hr 34min 44sec
23	56	(New Zealand) John Hunt (Australia) John Williams	Holden Monaro	16hr 44min 22sec
24	8	(Russia) Victor Shavelev (Russia) Alexandr Dolbish	Moskvitch Y08	16hr 47min 42sec
25	25	(United Kingdom) Peter Hall (United Kingdom) Mary Hall	Ford Escort Mark I	16hr 56min 9sec
26	92	(Australia) Rowan Quill (Australia) Bob Morrow	Ford Falcon XT GT	16hr 59min 30sec
27	50	(Italy) Marco Cajani (Italy) Antonello Macellari	Alfa Romeo Giulia TI	17hr 3min 31sec
28	19	(Australia) George Reynolds (Australia) Desmond West	Volkswagen Beetle	17hr 8min 0sec
29	82	(United Kingdom) Graham Goodall (United Kingdom) John Platt	Austin-Healey 3000	17hr 29min 32sec
30	83	(Netherlands) Wim Konigsveld (Netherlands) Go Wammes	Rover P5B	17hr 30min 50sec
31	85	(Japan) Yoshifumi Ogawa (France) Bertrand Renaudineau	Datsun P510	17hr 45min 36sec
32	27	(Australia) Vyvian Hirons (Australia) Brendon Lindsey	Alfa Romeo GTV	18hr 11min 20sec
33	15	(Netherlands) David van Lennep (Netherlands) Paul Van Dourne	DAF 55	18hr 14min 53sec
34	67	(Papua New Guinea) Nigel Egginton (Papua New Guinea) Bruno Fulcher	Holden Monaro	18hr 23min 21sec
35	103	(United Kingdom) Michael Cotter (United Kingdom) Graham Adams	Datsun 1600	18hr 38min 12sec
36	75	(United Kingdom) John Griffiths (United Kingdom) Neville Marriner	Ford Cortina Mark II	18hr 50min 6sec
37	43	(Australia) Gordon Ketelbey (Australia) Kim Ketelbey	Ford Mustang	20hr 41min 54sec
38	4	(United Kingdom) Doug Morris (United Kingdom) Bruce Stapleton	Morgan Plus 8	21hr 19min 43sec
39	40	(United Kingdom) Max Harvey (United Kingdom) Martyn Griffiths	Porsche 911 S	21hr 25min 36sec
40	69	(United Kingdom) Ian Mitchell (United Kingdom) David Harris	Ford Escort Mark I	21hr 32min 51sec
41	29	(Australia) Trevor Eastwood (Australia) David Hartley	Holden Monaro	22hr 33min 32sec
42	41	(Australia) Ross Lamb (Australia) John Malcolm	Holden HR	22hr 37min 14sec
43	55	(New Zealand) Alastair Caldwell (New Zealand) Vernon Pascoe	Mercedes-Benz 280 SL	22hr 50min 15sec
44	63	(Australia) Bruce Hogarth (Australia) Tony Wurf	Ford Falcon XT	23hr 9min 38sec
45	31	(Netherlands) Eric Leerdam (Netherlands) Jan van der Hayden	Peugeot 404	23hr 13min 49sec
46	72	(Hungary) Andras Jojart (Hungary) Janos Balazs	Porsche 911 RS	23hr 22min 20sec
47	62	(Australia) Vince Bloink (Australia) Robert Sainsbury	Peugeot 504	23hr 27min 37sec
48	102	(Australia) Lambros Kouriefs (Australia) Hugh Savage	Holden EH	23hr 46min 54sec
49	98	(Australia) Terry Lawrie (Australia) Richard Pierce	Holden Monaro HK	24hr 9min 11sec
50	80	(Australia) Pat Cole (Australia) Doug Briscoe	Mercedes-Benz 230 SL	24hr 54min 21sec
51	37	(United Kingdom) Sandy Dalgarno (United Kingdom) Sandy Taylor	Ford Cortina Lotus Mark I	25hr 2min 48sec
52	81	(United Kingdom) Tim Pearce (United Kingdom) Miles Pearce	Rover 2000 TC Mark I	25hr 35min 56sec
53	84	(United Kingdom) Richard Martin-Hurst (United Kingdom) Bill Meade	Rover P5B	25hr 38min 7sec
54	87	(United Kingdom) John Hills (United Kingdom) Trevor Chivers	Triumph 2000 Mark I	25hr 41min 5sec
55	74	(Australia) Lawrie Beacham (Australia) Jim Rosenow	Ford Falcon XT GT	26hr 9min 48sec
56	9	(Republic of Ireland) Paddy McClintock (Republic of Ireland) David Dunn	Peugeot 404	28hr 37min 14sec
57	104	(Australia) George Geshos (Australia) John McLean	Volkswagen Beetle	28hr 43min 51sec
58	65	(Netherlands) Rob van de Beek (Netherlands) Eismos Bergsma	Ford Mustang GT500	28hr 59min 10sec
59	13	(United Kingdom) Freddie Preston (United Kingdom) George Hampson	Rover 2000 TC Mark I	29hr 14min 26sec
60	68	(Australia) David Ryan (Australia) Gregory Stevenson	Holden Monaro	hr min sec
61	16	(United Kingdom) David Harrison (United Kingdom) Martin Proudlock	Ford Cortina Mark II	30hr 41min 16sec
62	32	(United Kingdom) Roy Dixon (United Kingdom) Angus Watt	Ford Zephyr Mark II	30hr 58min 7sec
63	5	(Australia) Gerry Lister (Australia) Kevin Edwards	Volvo 144S	31hr 22min 30sec
64	38	(Germany) Gunther Stamm (Germany) Corinna Stamm	MG MGB	31hr 32min 11sec
65	96	(Australia) John Hamilton (Australia) Giles Chapman	Hillman Hunter	32hr 17min 59sec
66	94	(Australia) Barry Rowe (United Kingdom) Harry Hawkes	MG MGB GT	33hr 3min 58sec
67	1	(United Kingdom) Andrew Cowan (United Kingdom) Johnstone Syer	Hillman Hunter	33hr 18min 35sec
68	36	(South Africa) Roger Pearce (South Africa) Sam Beukes	MG MGB GT	33hr 28min 15sec
69	12	(United States) Sidney Dickson (United States) Sue Loweree	AMC Rambler	35hr 26min 39sec
70	101	(United Kingdom) Thomas Grace (United Kingdom) Peter Woodward	Austin 1800	36hr 0min 2sec
71	106	(Australia) Mark Minarelli (Australia) John Rudajs	Ford Falcon XT GT	36hr 35min 16sec
72	73	(Australia) Terry Daly (New Zealand) Bob Brill	Ford Mustang	36hr 57min 54sec
73	60	(Australia) Georgina Chaseling (Australia) Virginia Bevan	Volvo 122S	37hr 3min 54sec
74	70	(Australia) Tom Barr Smith (Australia) Darkie Barr Smith	Rover P6B	37hr 44min 54sec
75	86	(Australia) Norbert Wyzenbeek (Australia) Stuart Wilkins	Porsche 911L	39hr 59min 44sec
76	90	(Australia) Michael Blakiston (Australia) Christopher Jones	Ford Escort Mark I	40hr 41min 7sec
77	42	(Czech Republic) Karel Simek (Czech Republic) Oto Lendecky	Škoda 1100 MB	42hr 14min 10sec
78	46	(Czech Republic) Jiri Kotek (Czech Republic) Jiri Sedivy	Škoda 1100 MB	42hr 16min 37sec
79	59	(Australia) Ben Seehusen (Australia) Andrew Dodd	Volkswagen Beetle	42hr 45min 51sec
80	17	(United Kingdom) Derek Bell (United Kingdom) Terry Kingsley	Volvo 144S	47hr 16min 21sec
81	93	(United Kingdom) Barry Gardner (United Kingdom) Jill Diamond	Triumph 2000 Mark I	52hr 30min 33sec
82	71	(Australia) Ron Verschuur (Australia) Bruce McAllister	MG MGB	53hr 17min 51sec
83	35	(United Kingdom) Peter Finnigan (United Kingdom) Neil Marjoram	Ford Cortina Lotus Mark II	65hr 18min 38sec
84	95	(United Kingdom) David Hall (United Kingdom) Jacky Hall	Volvo PV 544	68hr 12min 33sec
85	33	(United Kingdom) Ron Hodgson (United Kingdom) Gerald Brooks	Mercedes-Benz 220 SE	70hr 46min 6sec
86	52	(Japan) Yasuhisa Tokugawa (Japan) Fumio Kamei	Ford Escort Mark I	81hr 16min 36sec
