= Ford Falcon (XT) =

Australian full-size car

Ford XT Falcon
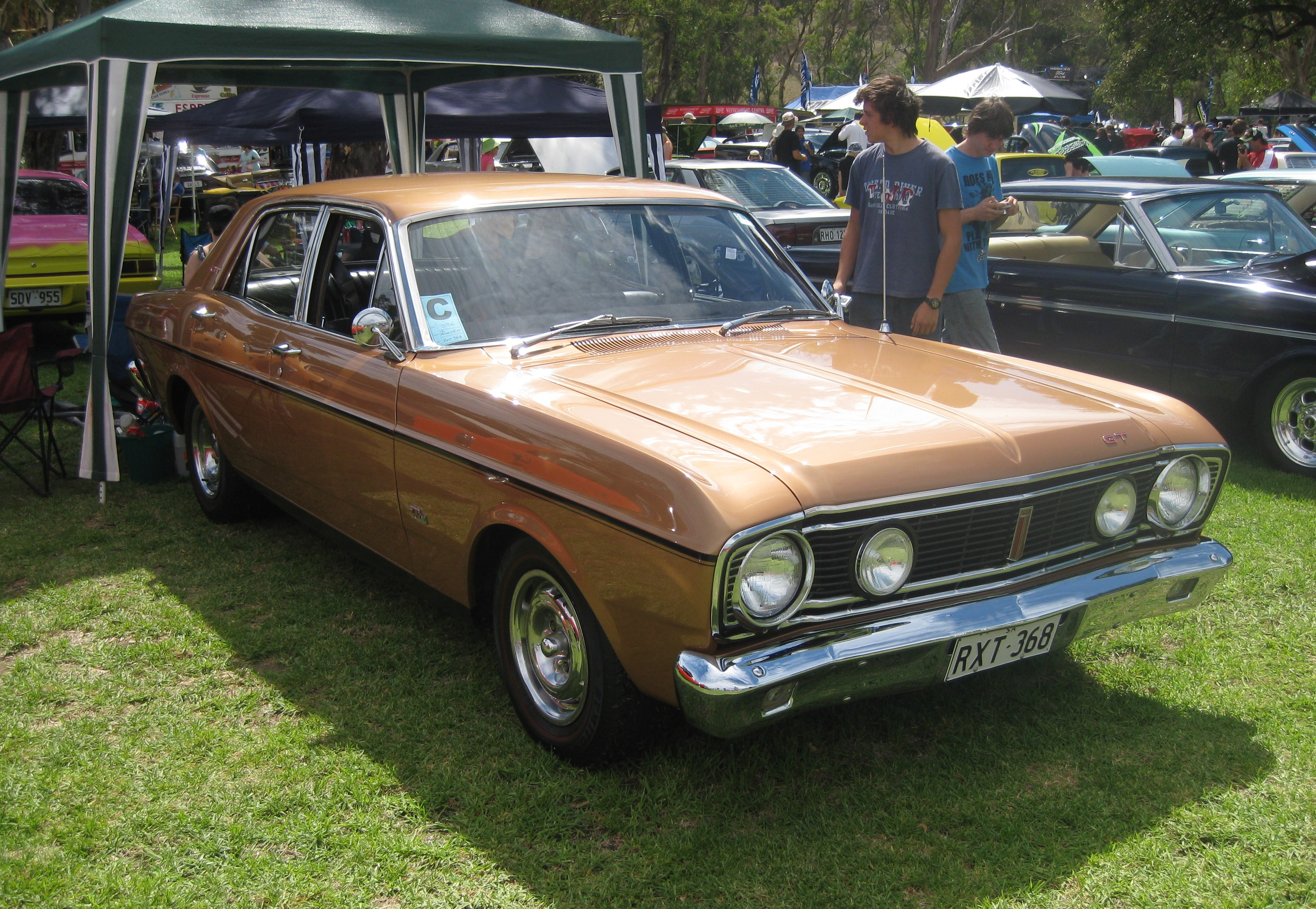
- Ford Falcon GT (XT)

Overview
- Manufacturer: Ford Australia
- Also called: Ford XT Fairmont
- Production: March 1968–June 1969

Body and chassis
- Class: Full-size car
- Body style: 4-door Sedan; 5-door Station Wagon; 2-door Coupé utility 2-door Van
- Related: Ford ZB Fairlane

Powertrain
- Engine: 3.1 L (188 CID) 6-cyl 3.6 L (221 CID) 6-cyl 5.0 L (302 CID) V8
- Transmission: 3spd manual 4 speed manual GT only 3spd “Fordomatic” automatic 3spd “SelectShift Cruis-o-matic” automatic

Dimensions
- Length: 4,689 mm (184.6 in)
- Width: 1,875 mm (73.8 in)
- Height: 1,389 mm (54.7 in)
- Kerb weight: 1,324 kg (2,918.9 lb) (sedan)

Chronology
- Predecessor: Ford XR Falcon
- Successor: Ford XW Falcon

The Ford Falcon (XT) is a full-size car that was produced by Ford Australia from 1968 to 1969. It was the second iteration of the second generation of the Falcon and also included the Ford Fairmont (XT)—the luxury-oriented version.

== Introduction ==
The XT Falcon range was introduced in March 1968 as a facelifted version of the XR Falcon, which it replaced. The XT featured a revised grille and taillights and improved safety features including split-system brakes, larger tyres and electrically operated windscreen washers.

Standard equipment in the luxury Fairmont models included bucket seats, front disc brakes, a heater/demister, a wood-grain dash, carpet and courtesy lamps in all four doors. The Fairmont Wagon featured an electrically operated tailgate.

== Model range ==
The XT was offered in 4-door Sedan, 5-door Station Wagon, 2-door Utility and 2-door Van variants as follows.

- Falcon Sedan
- Falcon 500 Sedan
- Fairmont Sedan
- Falcon GT Sedan
- Falcon Wagon
- Falcon 500 Wagon
- Fairmont Wagon
- Falcon Utility
- Falcon 500 Utility
- Falcon Van

The luxury Fairmont models were not badged or marketed as Falcons.

The XT Falcon GT, which was introduced two months after the other models in May 1968, was the performance model in the range.

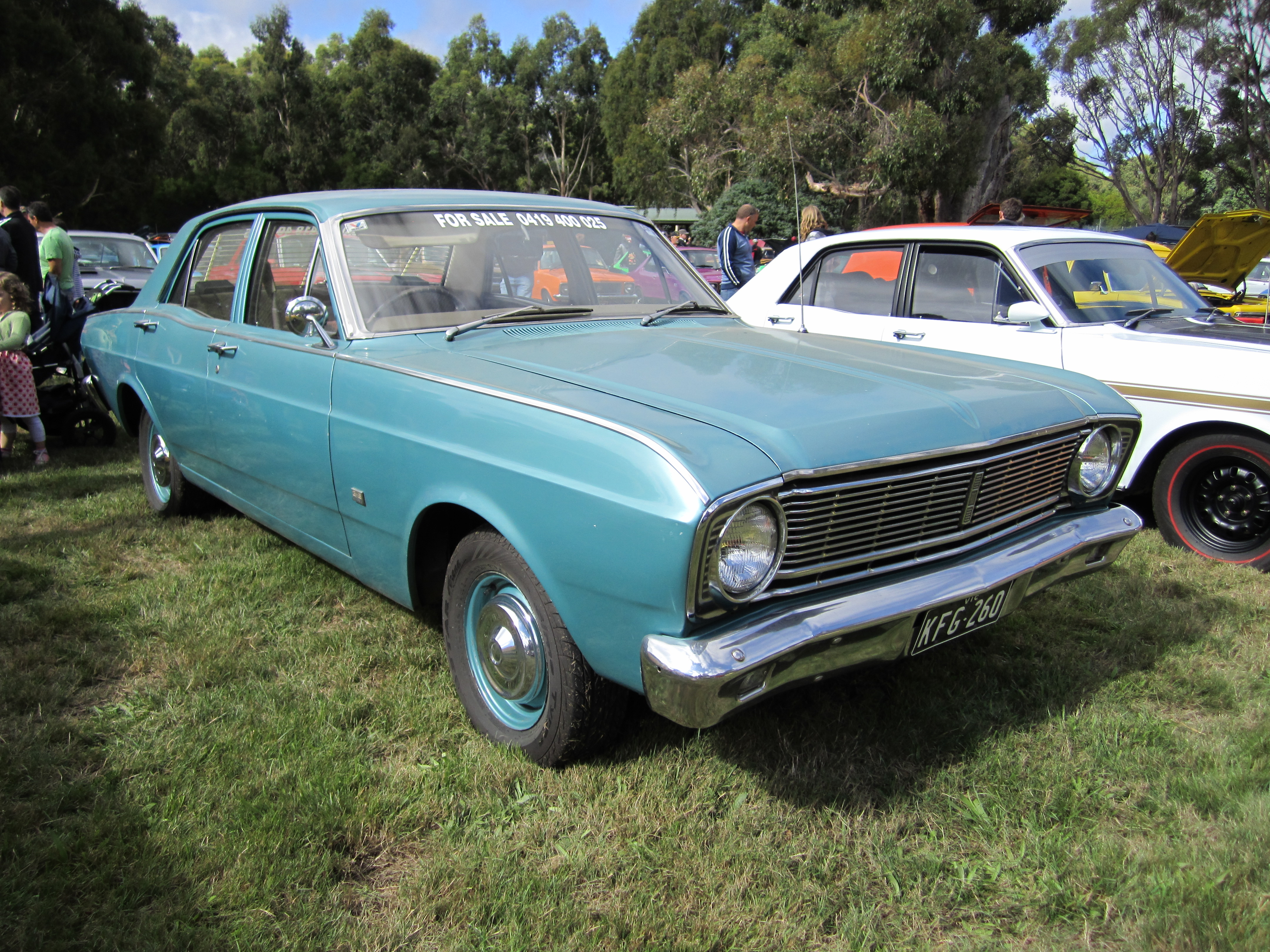
Ford XT Falcon sedan

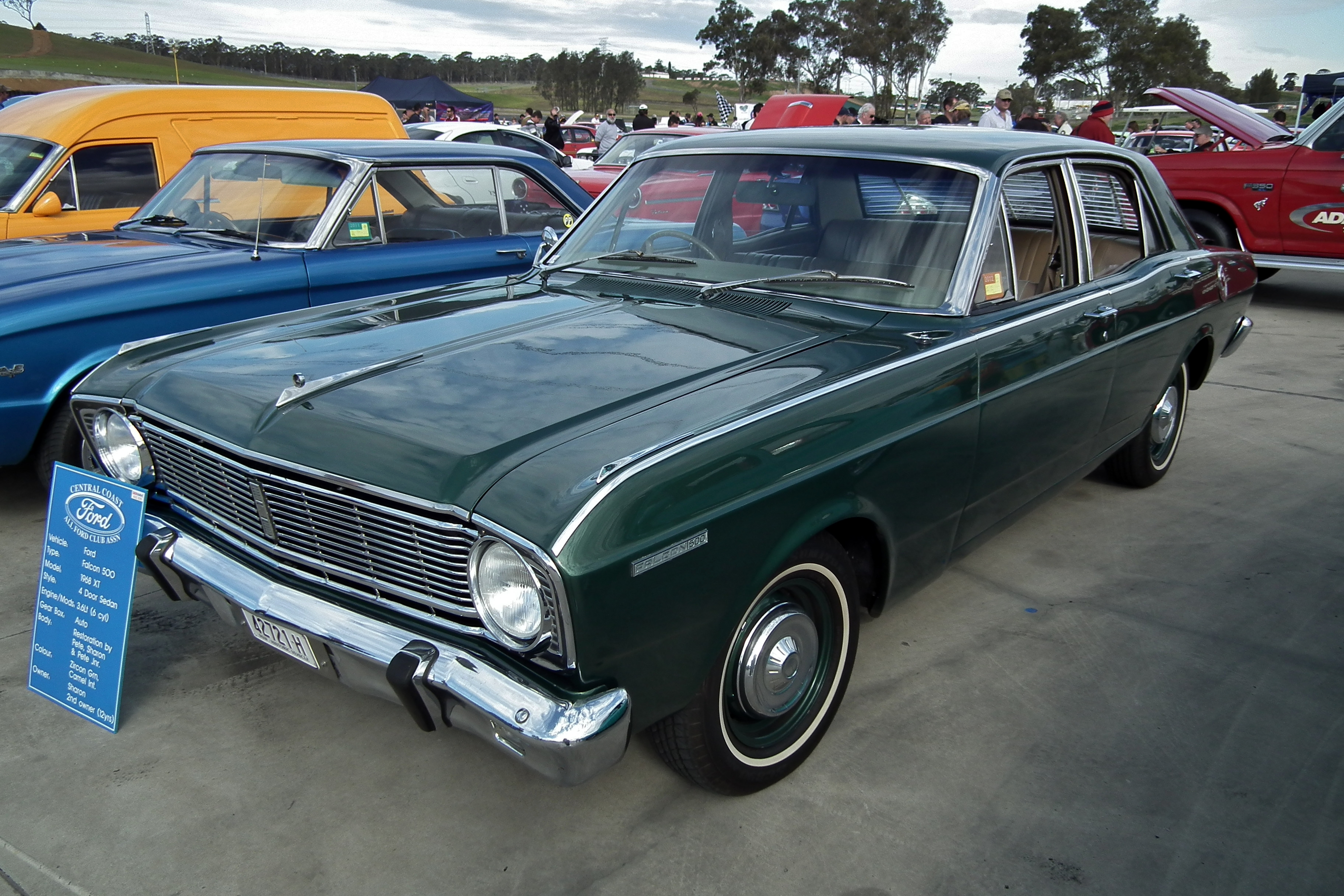
Ford XT Falcon 500 sedan

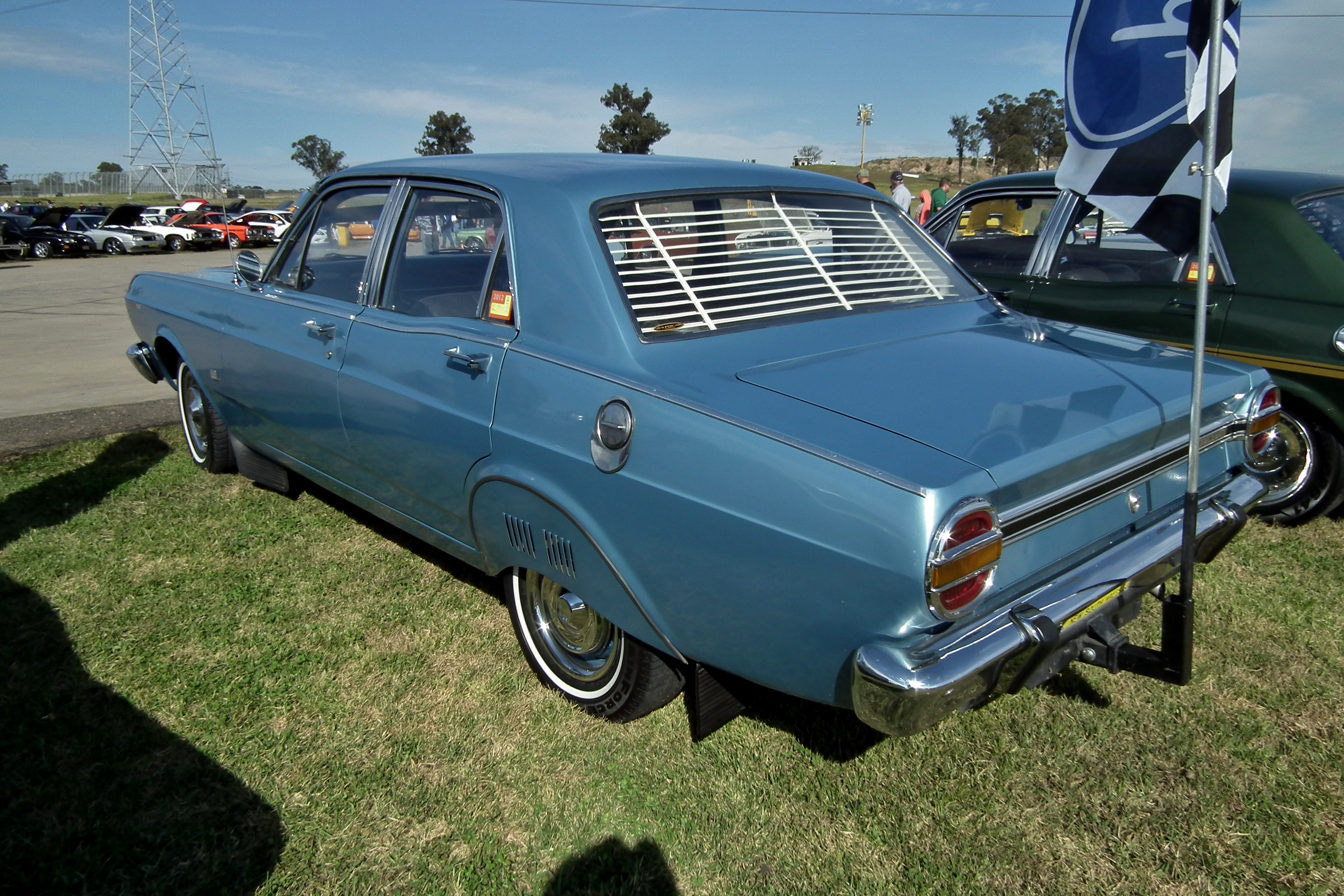
Ford XT Falcon 500 sedan

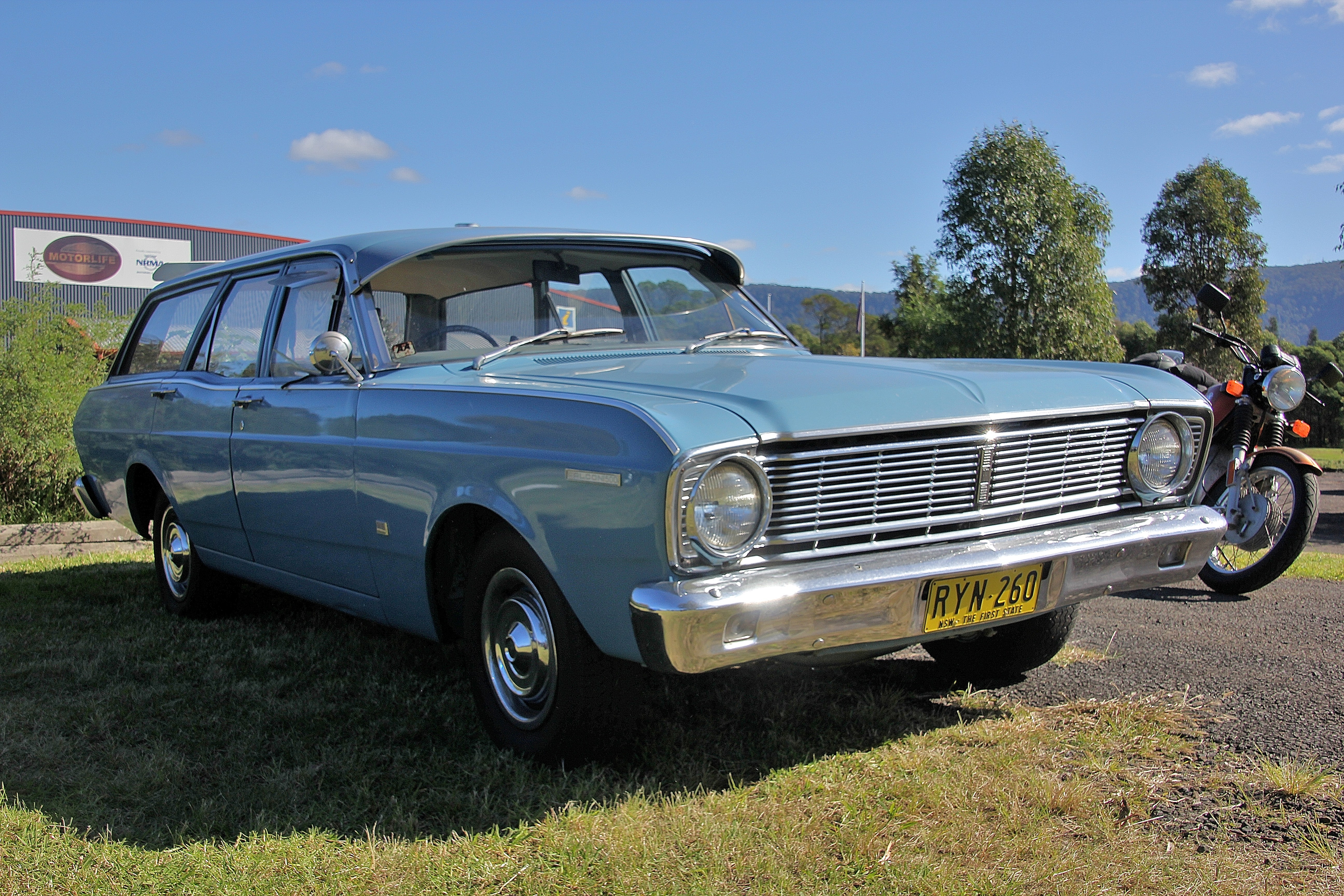
Ford XT Falcon 500 wagon

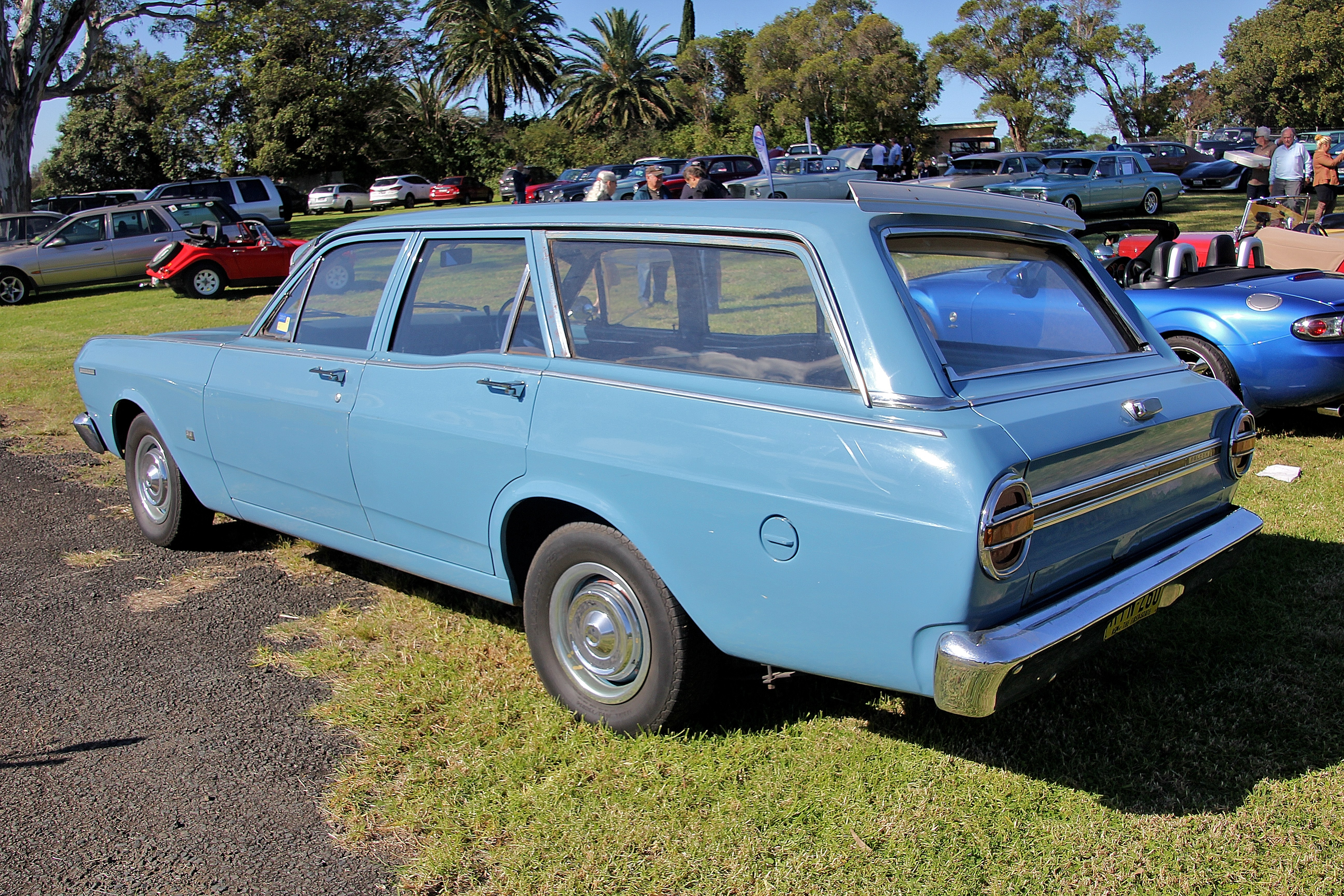
Ford XT Falcon 500 wagon

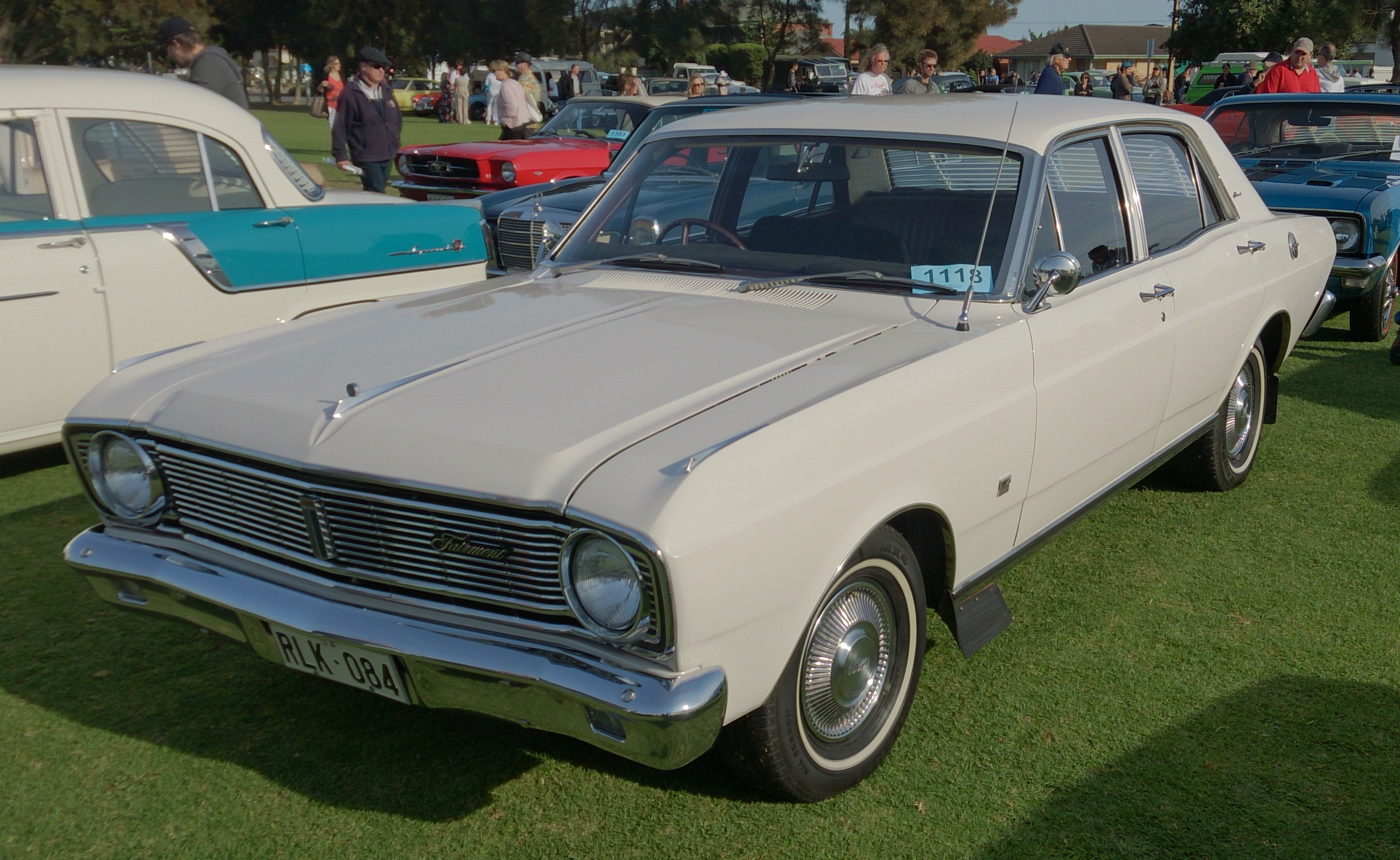
Ford XT Fairmont sedan

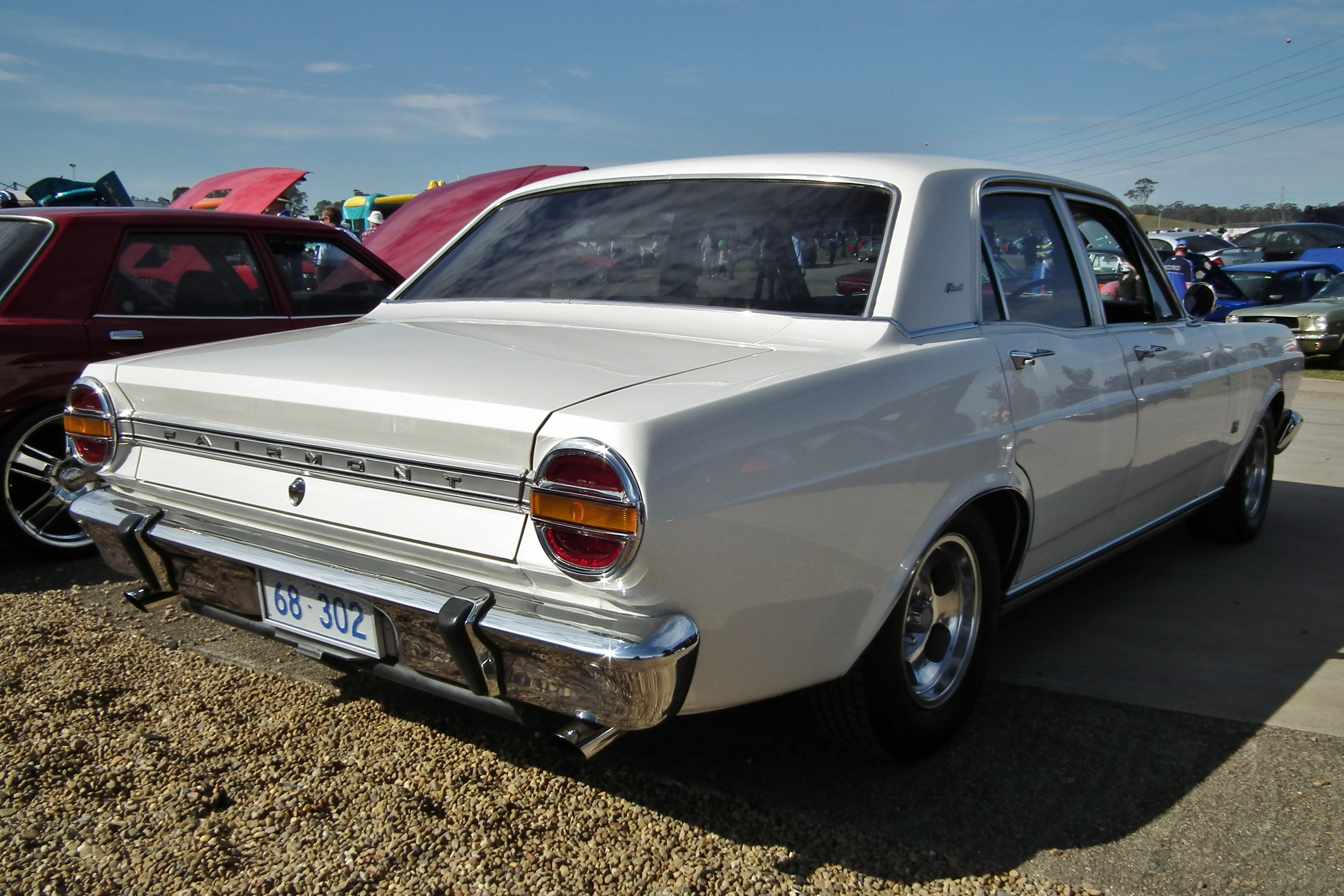
Ford XT Fairmont (non standard wheels)

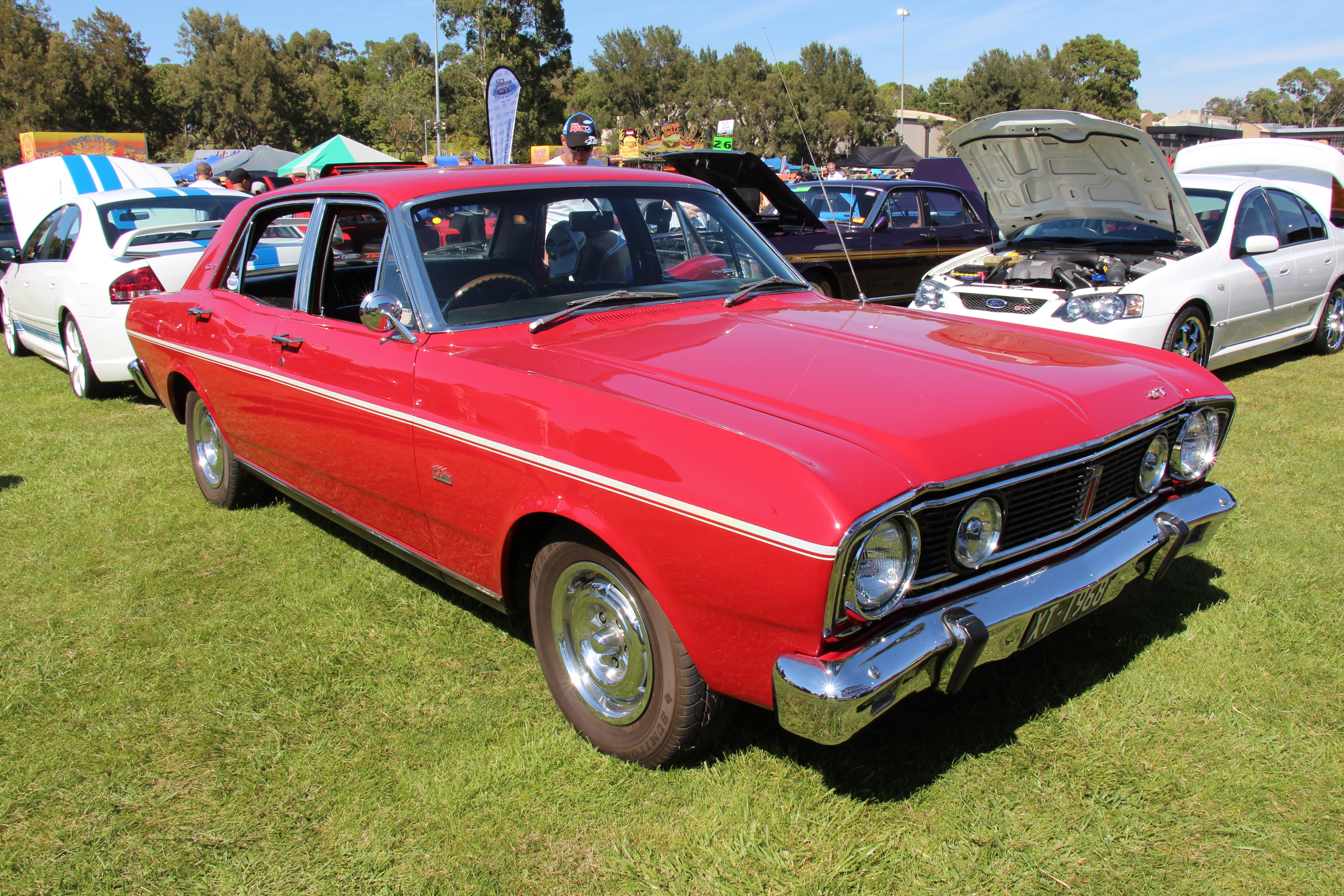
Ford XT Falcon GT sedan

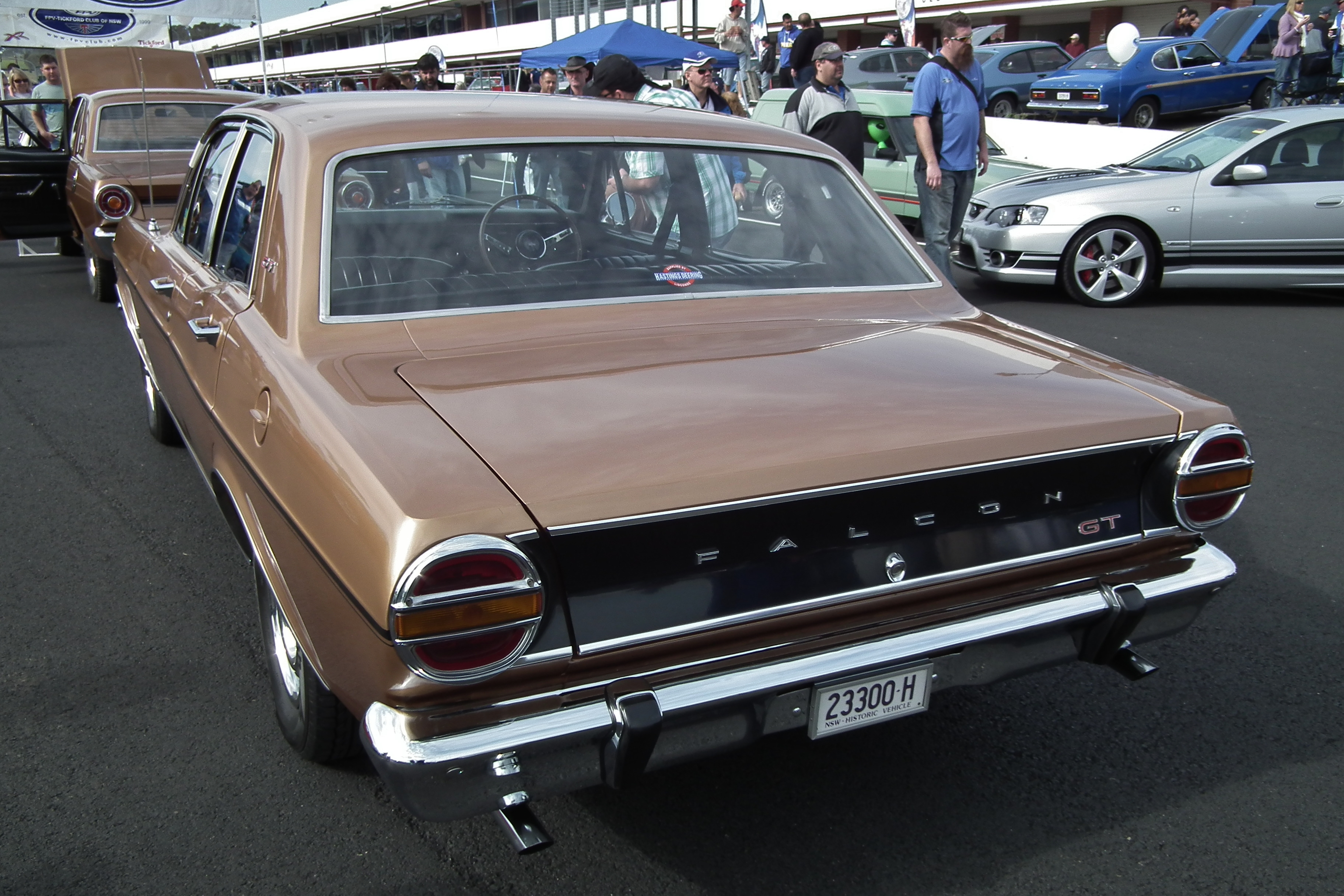
Ford XT Falcon GT sedan

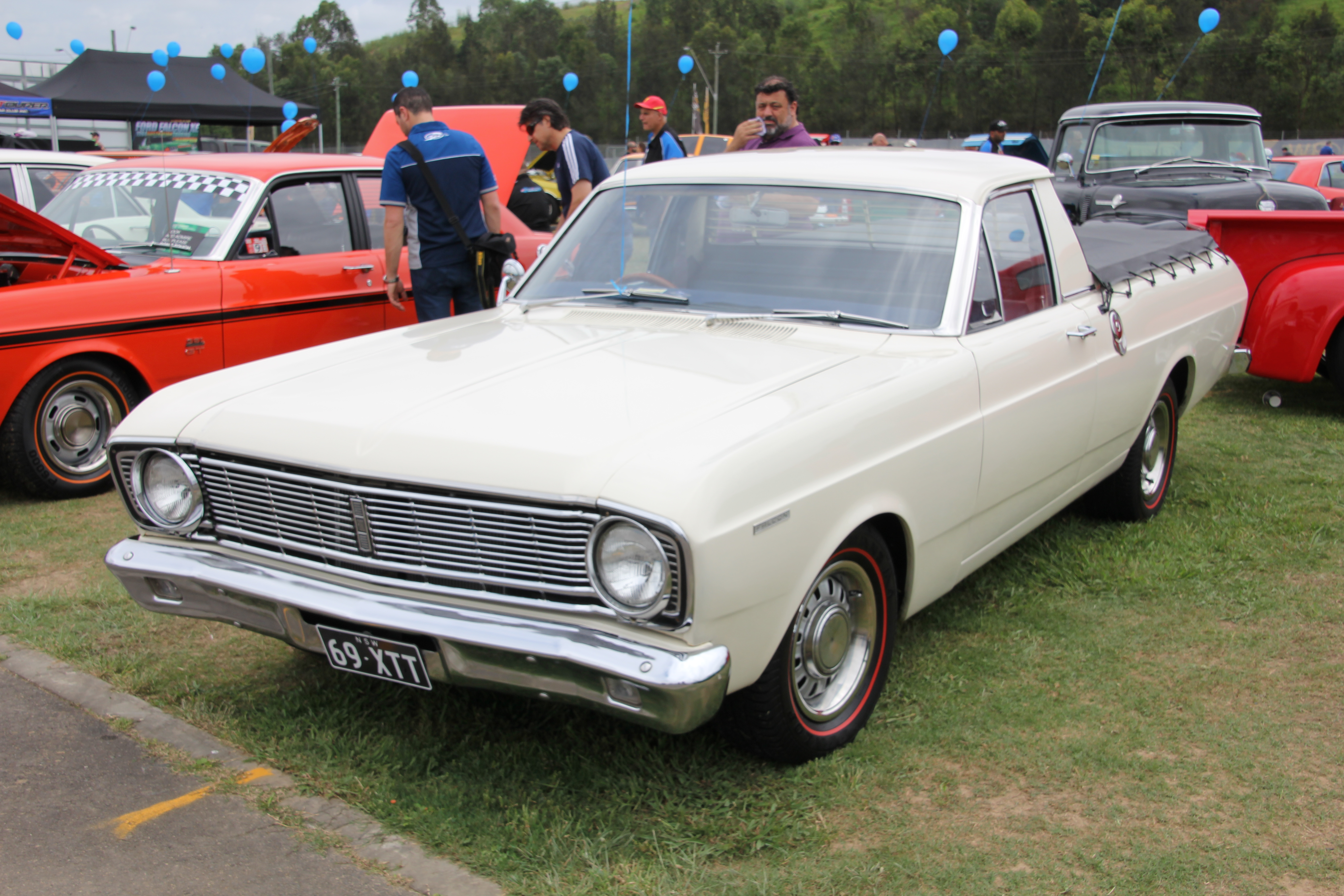
Ford XT Falcon utility (non standard wheels)

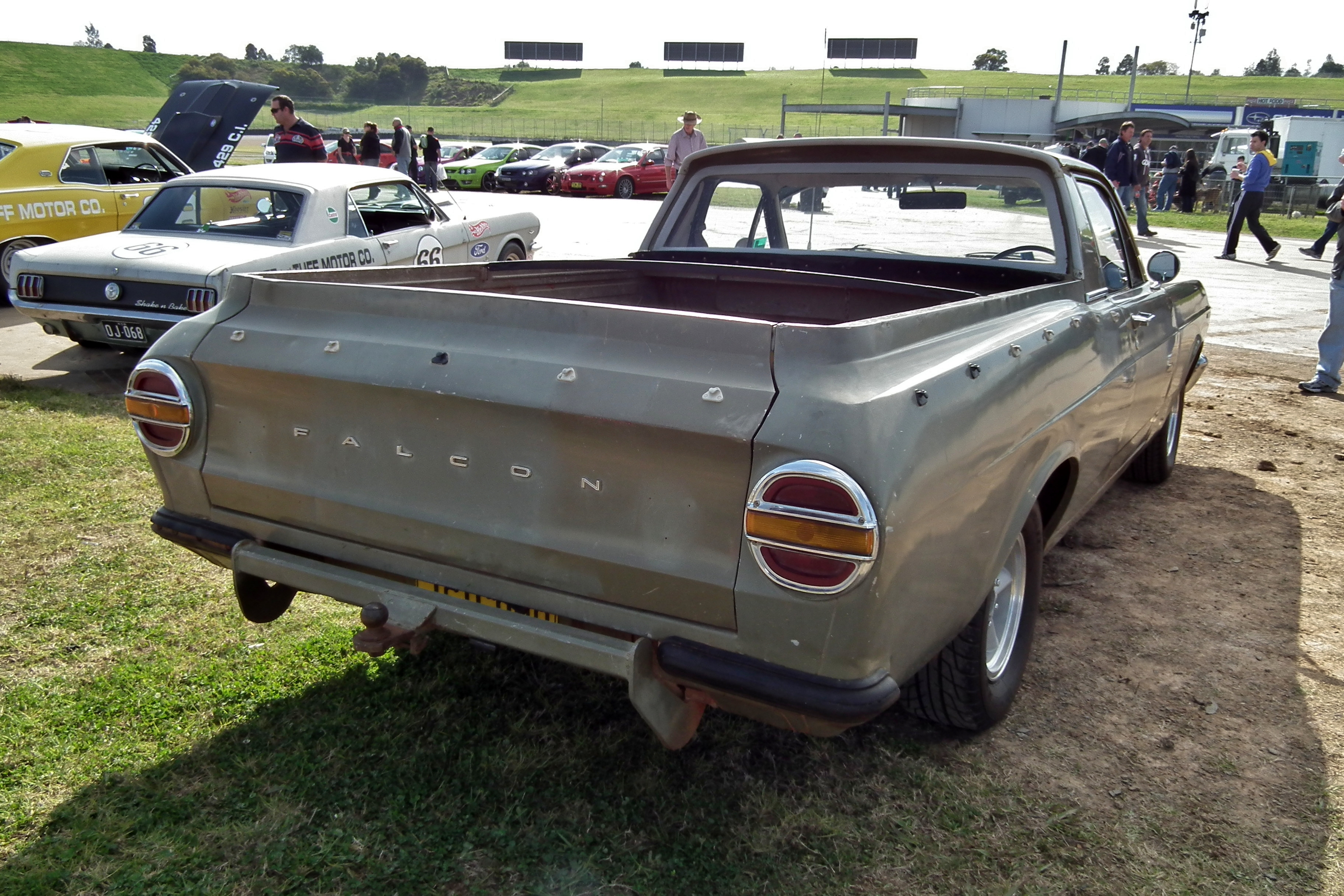
Ford XT Falcon utility

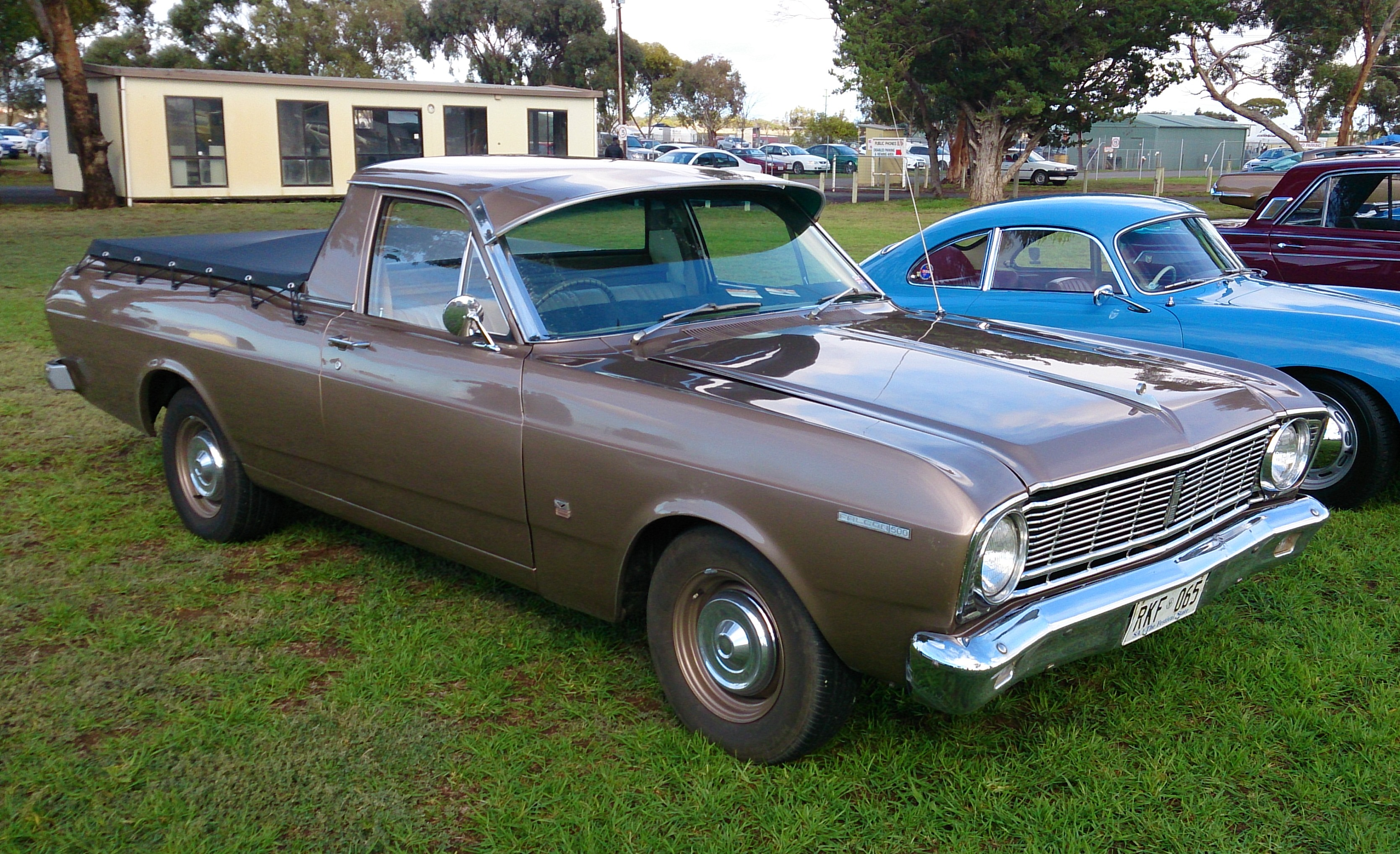
Ford XT Falcon 500 utility

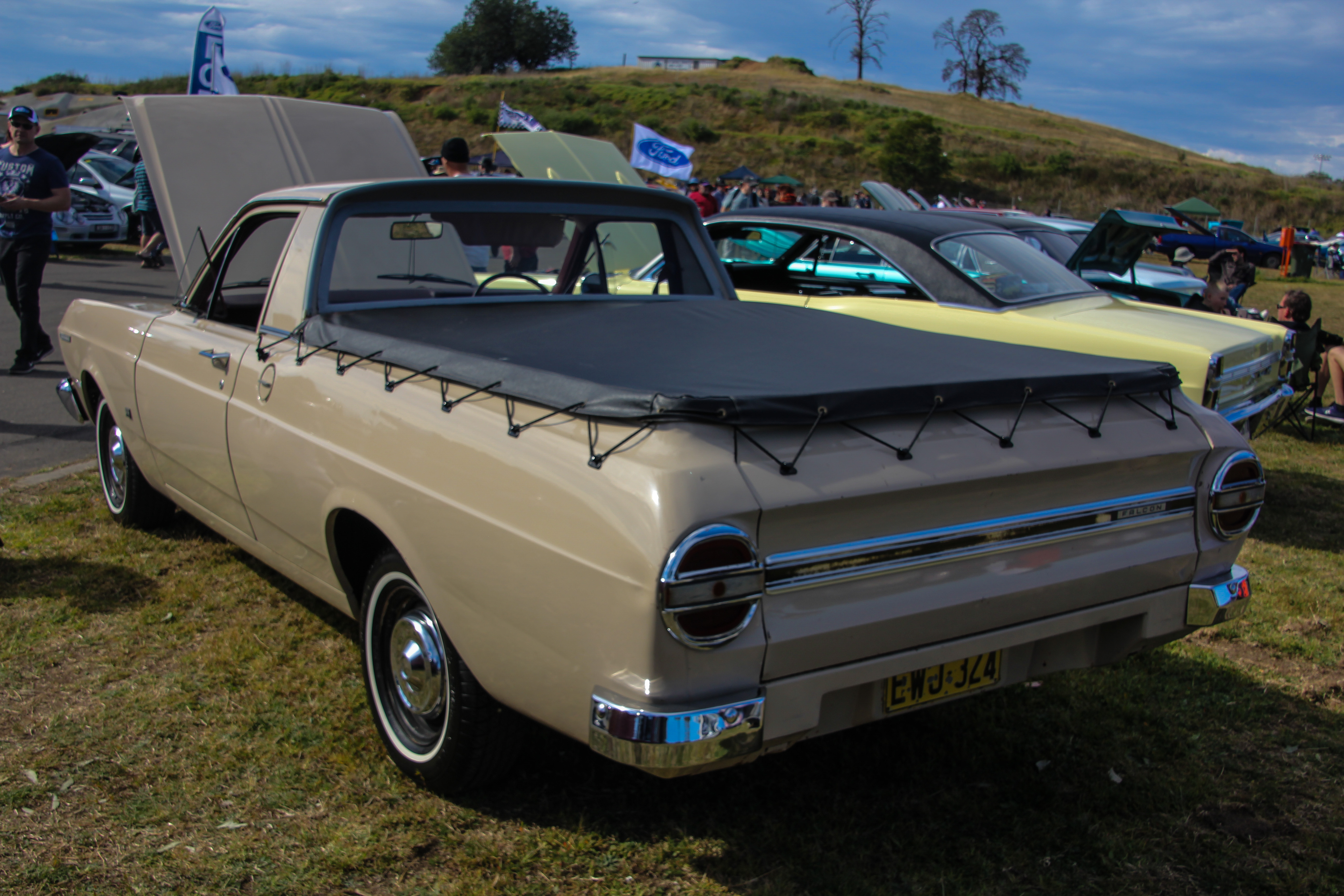
Ford XT Falcon 500 utility

== Engines ==
Four engines were offered in the XT range, all with increased capacity.

- 3.1 L (188 CID) 114 bhp six-cylinder was standard on Falcon and Falcon 500 models
- 3.6 L (221 CID) 135 bhp six-cylinder was standard on Fairmont models and optional on Falcon and Falcon 500
- 5.0 L (302 CID) 210 bhp V8 was optional on Falcon, Falcon 500 and Fairmont
- 5.0 L (302 CID) 230 bhp V8 was standard on Falcon GT

Engine capacity was now officially quoted in litres rather than cubic inches.

== Production & replacement ==
After a production run of 79,290 vehicles the XT Falcon was replaced by the XW Falcon in June 1969. The XT model designation would be reused for the entry-level model of the BA Falcon which launched in 2002, replacing the Forte version on the previous AU model.

== Motorsport ==
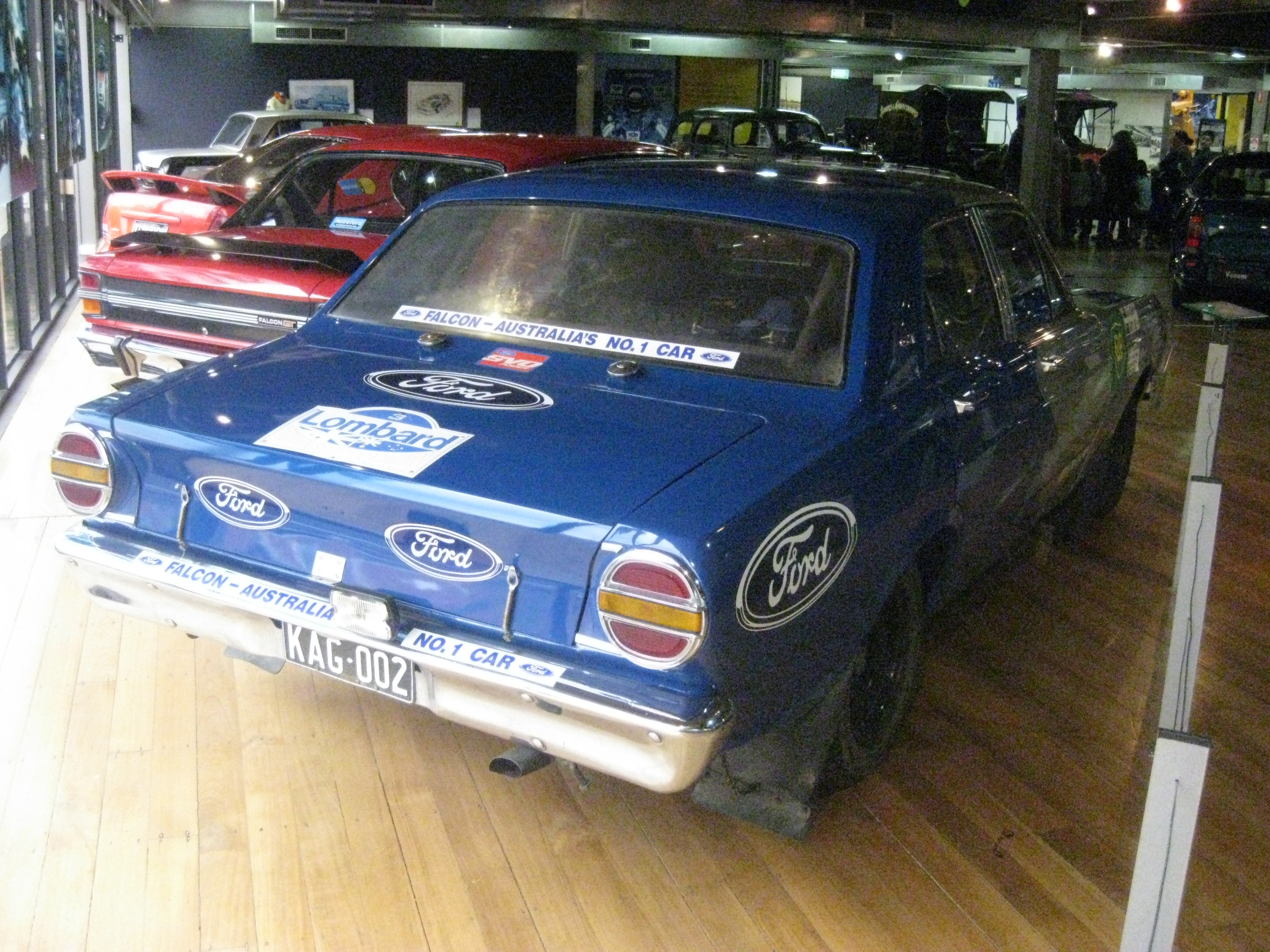
The Ford Falcon GT (XT) which placed 3rd in the 1968 London-Sydney Marathon

An XT Falcon GT driven by Bill Gates and Jim Bertram scored an outright victory in the 1969 Rothmans 12 Hour Classic race for production cars at Surfers Paradise International Raceway on 5 January 1969.

A team of three XT Falcon GTs won the Teams prize in the 1968 London-Sydney Marathon, finishing 3rd, 6th and 8th outright.
