= Joe McAndrew (rally driver) =

New Zealand rally driver

"Smokin'" Joe McAndrew is one of New Zealand's most successful rally drivers with a record three national championship titles, won in 1993, 1994 and 1996. He also won the 2002 World TWE Marathon, and has over 25 national event wins to his name.
