= Sunbeam-Talbot Ten =

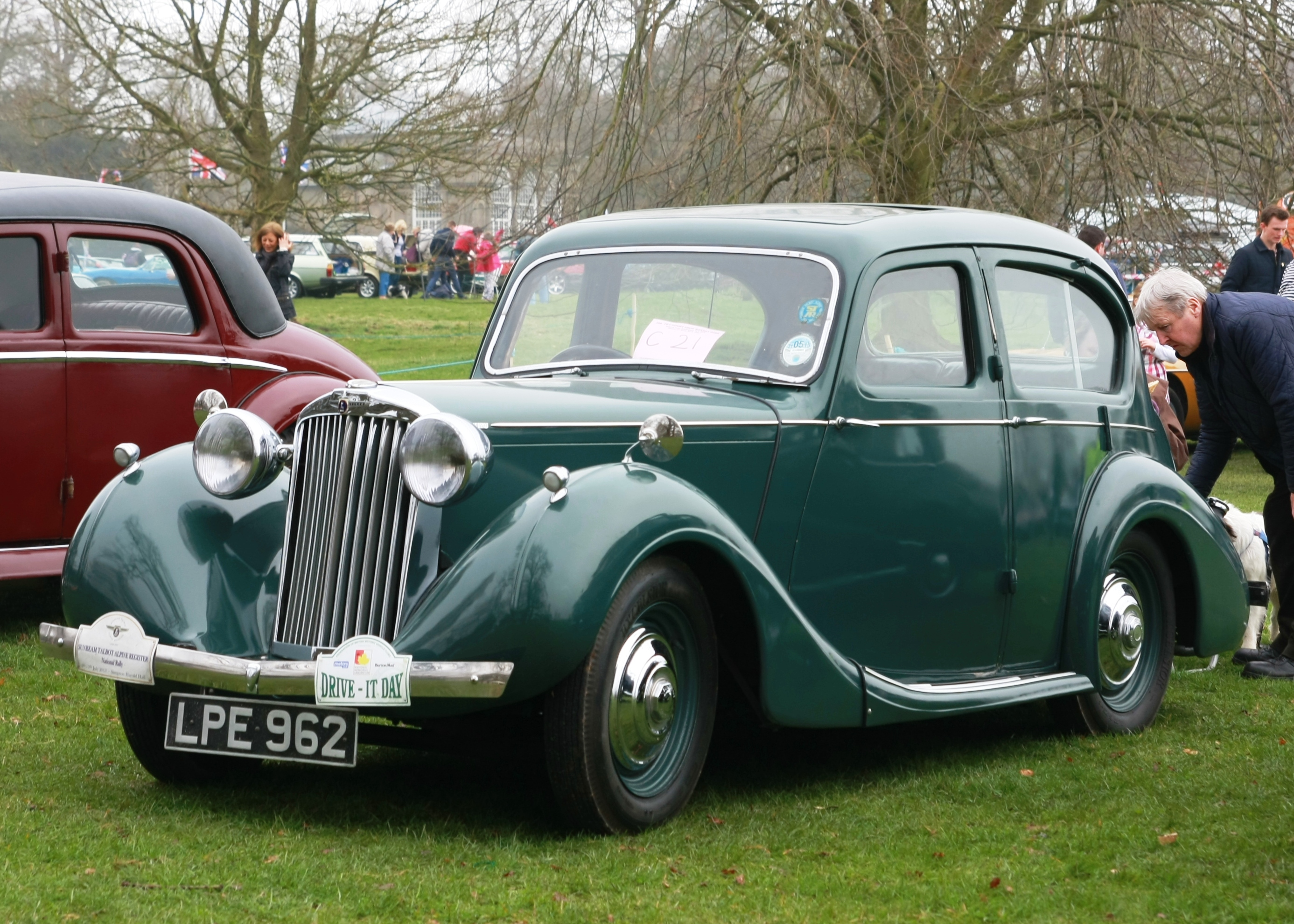
- 1947 Sunbeam-Talbot Ten sports saloon

Overview
- Manufacturer: Sunbeam-Talbot (Rootes Group)
- Production: 1938-1948

Body and chassis
- Class: Compact executive car (D)
- Body style: 2-door and 4-door sports saloon 2-door drophead coupe 2-door open sports tourer
- Related: Sunbeam-Talbot 2 Litre

Powertrain
- Engine: 1185 cc Straight-4
- Transmission: 4-speed manual

Dimensions
- Wheelbase: 94 in (2,388 mm)
- Length: 156 in (3,962 mm)
- Width: 60 in (1,524 mm)

Chronology
- Predecessor: Hillman Minx
- Successor: Sunbeam-Talbot 80

The Sunbeam-Talbot Ten is a compact executive car or small sports saloon manufactured by Rootes Group in their Clément-Talbot factory in North Kensington between 1938 and 1939, and then reintroduced after the Second World War and sold between 1945 and 1948. It was at first a two-door then a four-door sports saloon. A drophead coupé version and a sports tourer version were also available.

== Talbot Ten ==
The Clément-Talbot and then the Sunbeam Motor Car Company businesses fell into the hands of Rootes in 1935, and the new owner's strategy was clearly to use the prestige of the Talbot name for selling larger numbers of lower priced cars than hitherto. This Rootes' Talbot Ten was one of the first products of the Rootes strategy intended to open Talbot's planned shift down-market and add a genuinely small car to the proposed range. A star of the 1936 Motor Show it was a lengthened Hillman Aero Minx with a stronger chassis all updated at short notice by Talbot's Georges Roesch and rebadged and so another variant of the existing middle market saloon, the Hillman Minx. Reviewers described the car as an attractive refined and well-equipped small car.

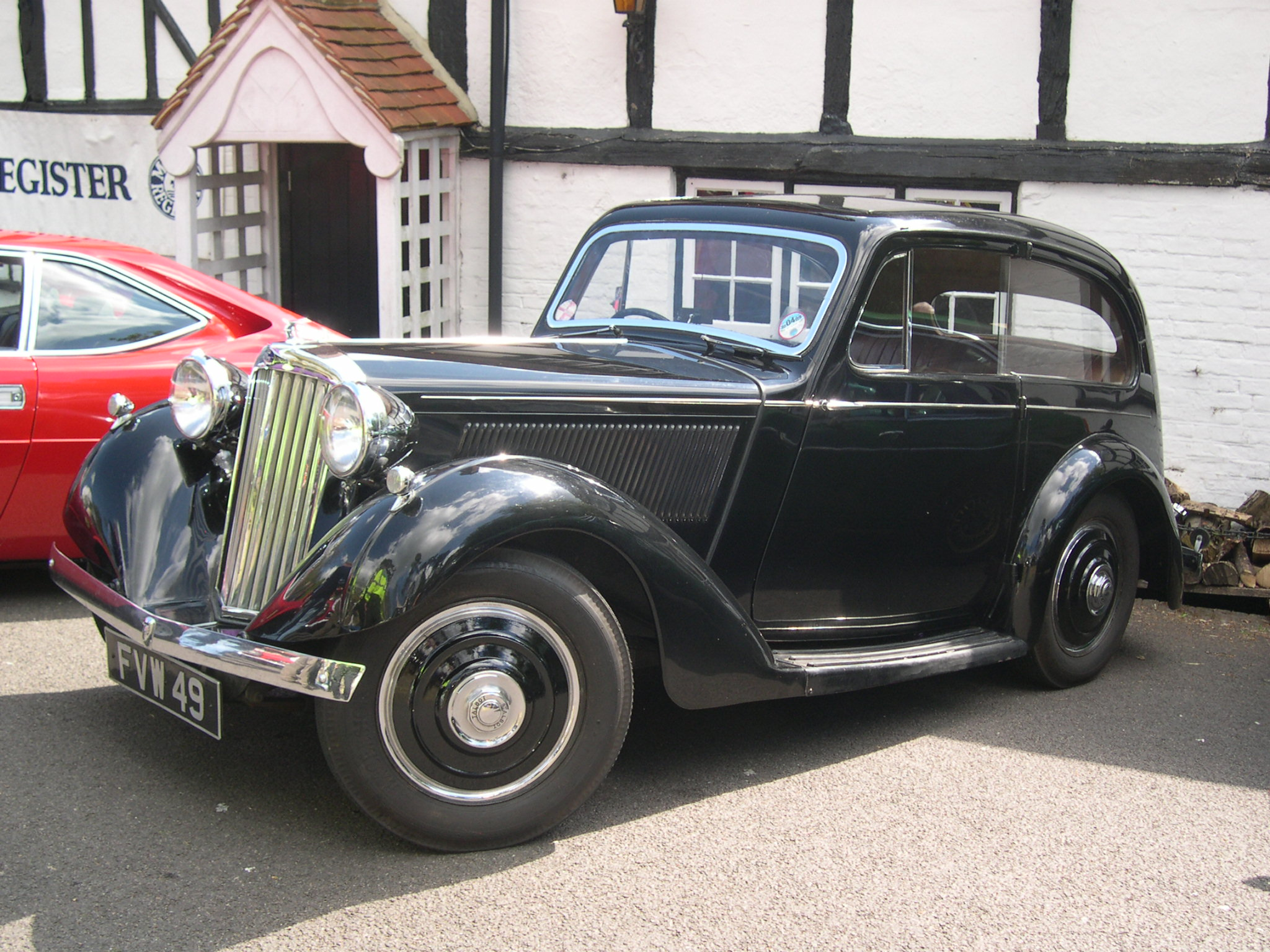
1937 Talbot Ten pillarless saloon

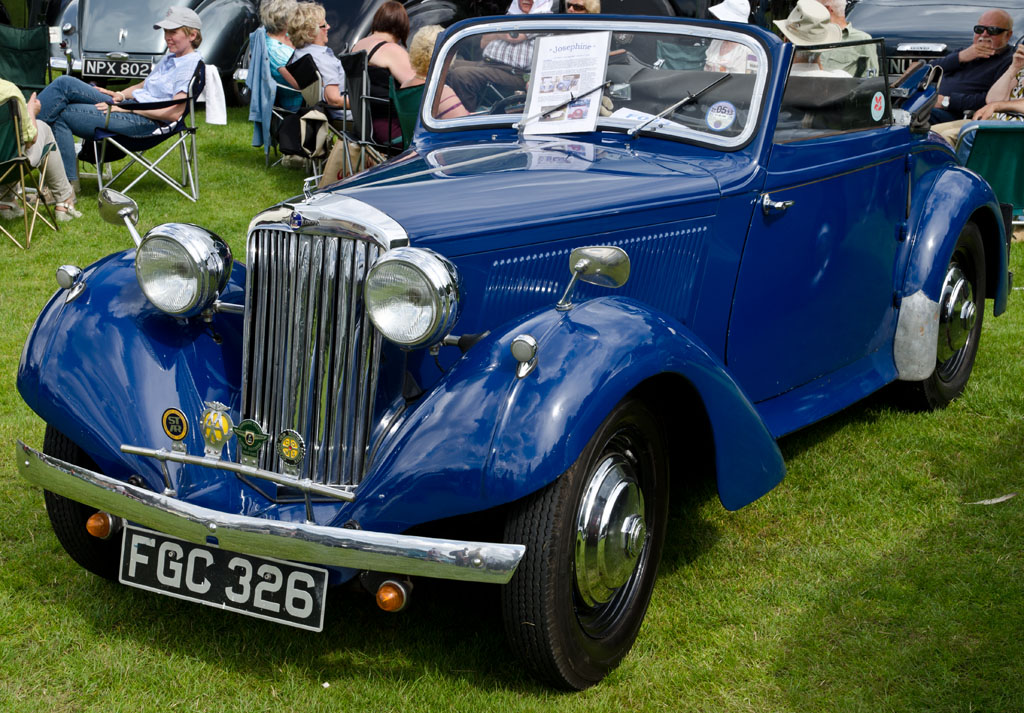
1938 Talbot Ten drophead coupé

=== Bodies ===
The pillarless two-door saloon body made at the Darracq Motor Engineering Company works in Acton was probably shaped by Rootes' Ted White, manager of Rootes' body engineering department. The open tourer was made by Whittingham & Mitchel and the drophead coupé with an intermediate coupé de ville position was made by Abbott of Farnham.

== Sunbeam-Talbot Ten ==
The Talbot Ten was rebadged Sunbeam-Talbot Ten in August 1938. Rootes had decided to make no large luxury car using the Sunbeam name but keep the name alive by linking it with Talbot. Although apparently just a rebadged four door version of the Talbot Ten the new Sunbeam-Talbot Ten was given a whole new all-steel body with four doors. Changes included pressed steel wheels but covered by wheel discs, a normal lever for the gear changes, better instruments, and slightly reshaped front mudguards. Synchromesh was dropped from first gear and then later from second gear. (Note: When a car was at rest the then current synchromesh device could block a gear's engagement) The new body was on effectively the same chassis but the engine and the radiator were moved 3.5 inches forward. This body was again made in Acton but by British Light Steel Pressings in their Works next door. Cars exported to Europe were badged Sunbeam. The car was undoubtedly the most elegant small saloon of the period.

The classic saloon featured the streamlining increasingly characteristic of mainstream British cars in the later 1930s, along with "stand-alone" headlights. Power came from a 1185 cc side-valve engine for which 41 bhp (31 kW) of power output was claimed. All four wheels were suspended using semi elliptical leaf springs. Top speed was quoted as 68 mph (109 km/h).

In 1948 the Sunbeam-Talbot Ten was almost exactly twice the price of the new Austin A40 Devon and slightly slower on the highway.

Visually the faster Sunbeam-Talbot 2 Litre was virtually indistinguishable from the Ten, but it was actually about 3 inches (7.6 cm) longer in wheel-base and overall body length.

=== Production ===
- Talbot Ten 1935 to 1938:

2-dr saloon: 2,450 DHC: 581; tourer: 554; open two-seater: 0; Other: 9; chassis: 56

- Sunbeam-Talbot Ten 1938 to 1948:

4-dr saloon: 5,655 DHC: 767; tourer: 822; open two-seater: 11; Other: 2

In 1948 the Sunbeam-Talbot Ten was replaced by the full-width bodied Sunbeam-Talbot 80 which was essentially a restyled version of the same car and shared the same roof pressing.

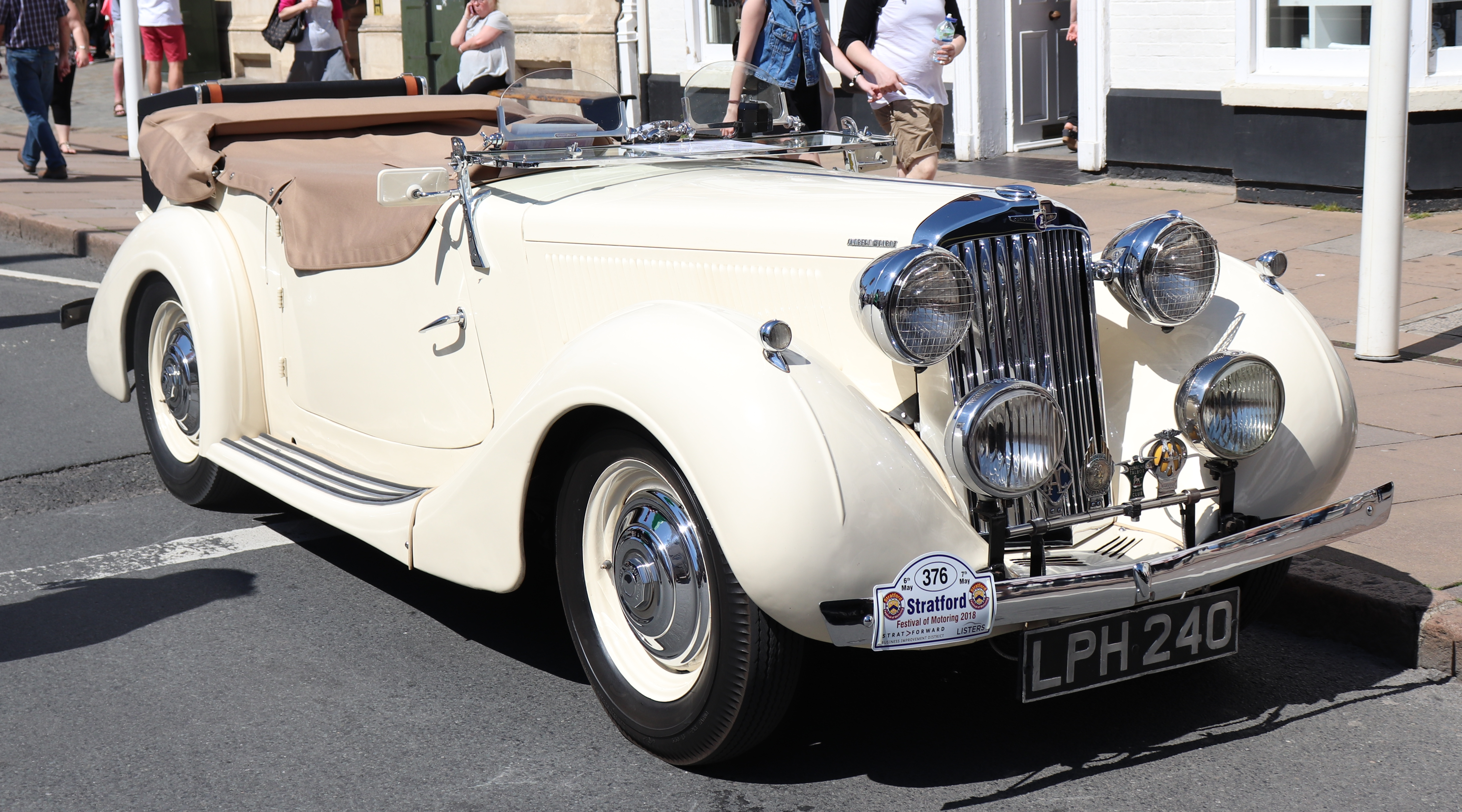
1947 Sunbeam-Talbot Ten Drophead Coupe

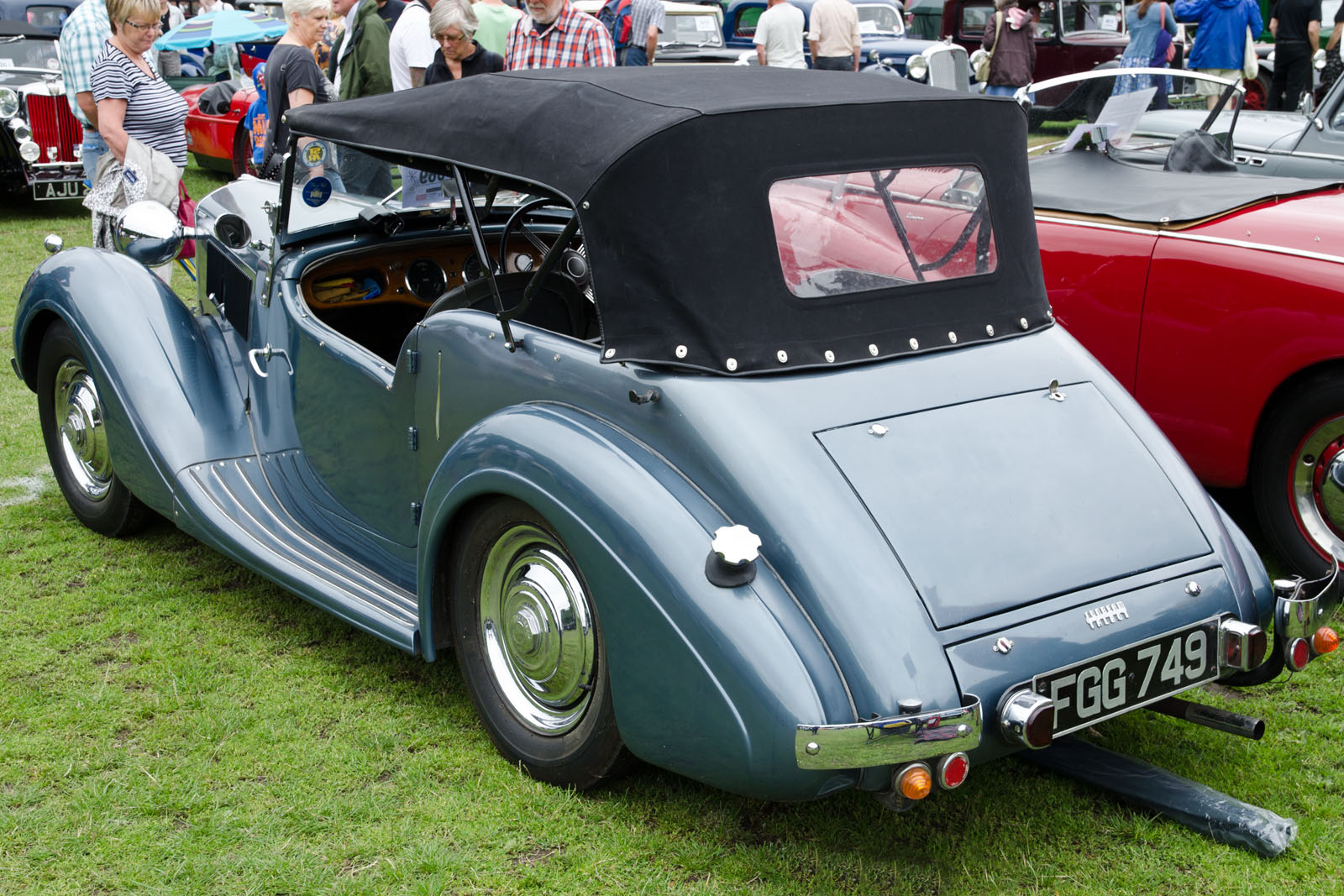
1948 Sunbeam-Talbot Ten sports tourer
