= Sunbeam-Talbot 90 =

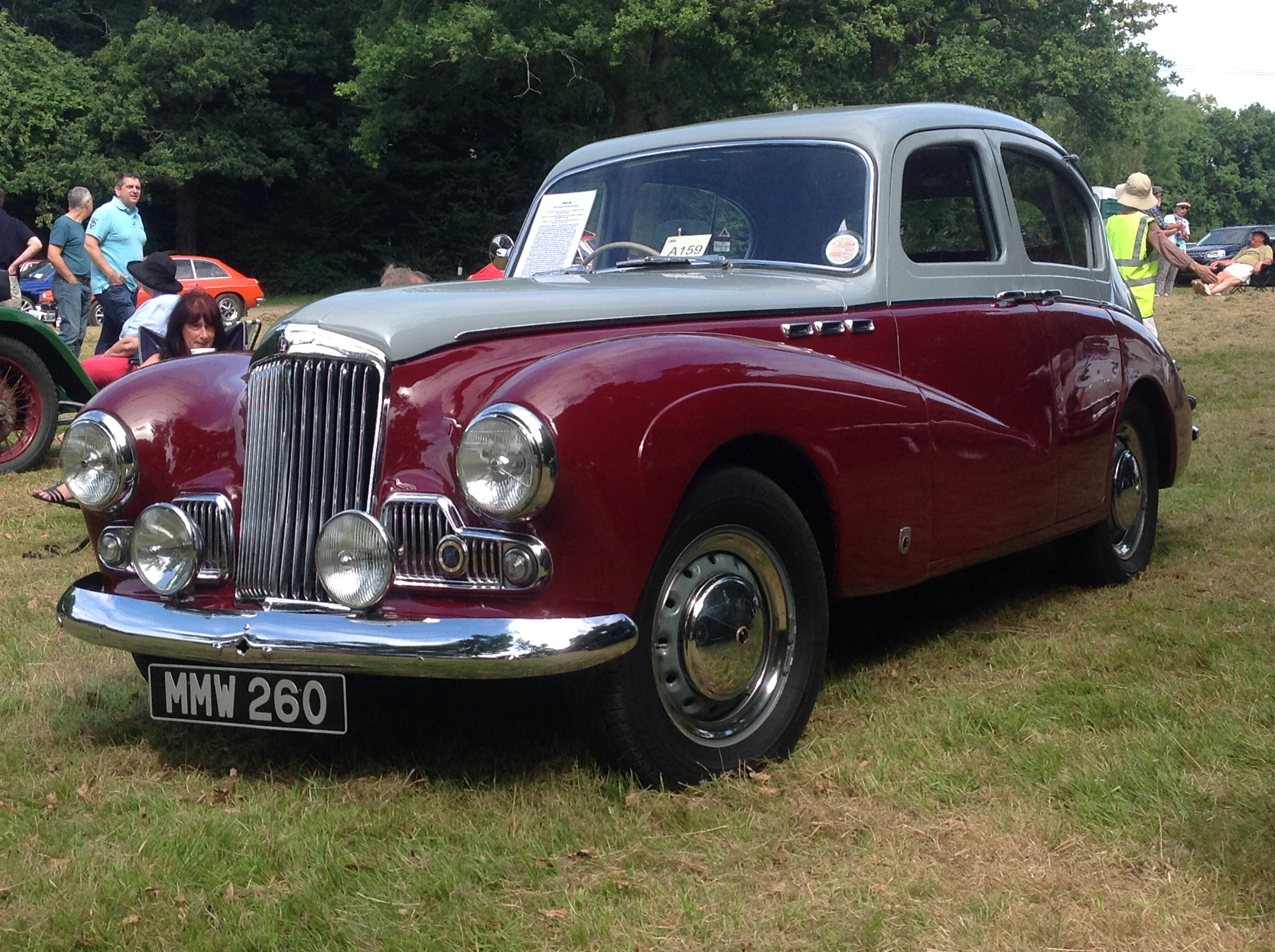
- Sunbeam MkIII registered July 1955

Overview
- Manufacturer: Sunbeam-Talbot (Rootes Group)
- Production: 1948–1954; 20,381 built

Body and chassis
- Class: Compact executive car (D)
- Body style: 4-door 4-light sports saloon 2-door drophead coupe
- Related: Sunbeam-Talbot 80

Powertrain
- Engine: 1944 cc I4 (until 1952); 2267 cc I4 (from 1952)
- Transmission: 4-speed manual

Dimensions
- Wheelbase: 97.5 in (2,476 mm)
- Length: 167.5 in (4,254 mm)
- Width: 62.5 in (1,588 mm)
- Height: 59 in (1,499 mm)

Chronology
- Predecessor: Sunbeam-Talbot 2 Litre
- Successor: Sunbeam Mk III

The Sunbeam-Talbot 90 is an automobile which was produced and built by Sunbeam-Talbot from 1948 to 1954 and continued as the Sunbeam Mk III from 1954 to 1957.

The 90 was launched in 1948 along with the smaller-engined Sunbeam-Talbot 80 but many features dated back to the pre war Sunbeam-Talbot 2 Litre. The body, available as a 4-door 4-light sports saloon or 2-door drophead coupe, appeared completely new though it continued some major pressings. The saloon featured the original Aero-Minx "pillarless" join between the glass on the rear door and the rear quarter window with its distinctive Sunbeam-Talbot reverse slope.

This car went through three versions before the name was changed to Sunbeam Mk III (without "Talbot") in 1954.

The Sunbeam-Talbot 90 MkIIA was the last car to bear the Sunbeam-Talbot name.

== Sunbeam-Talbot 90 (1948–1950) ==
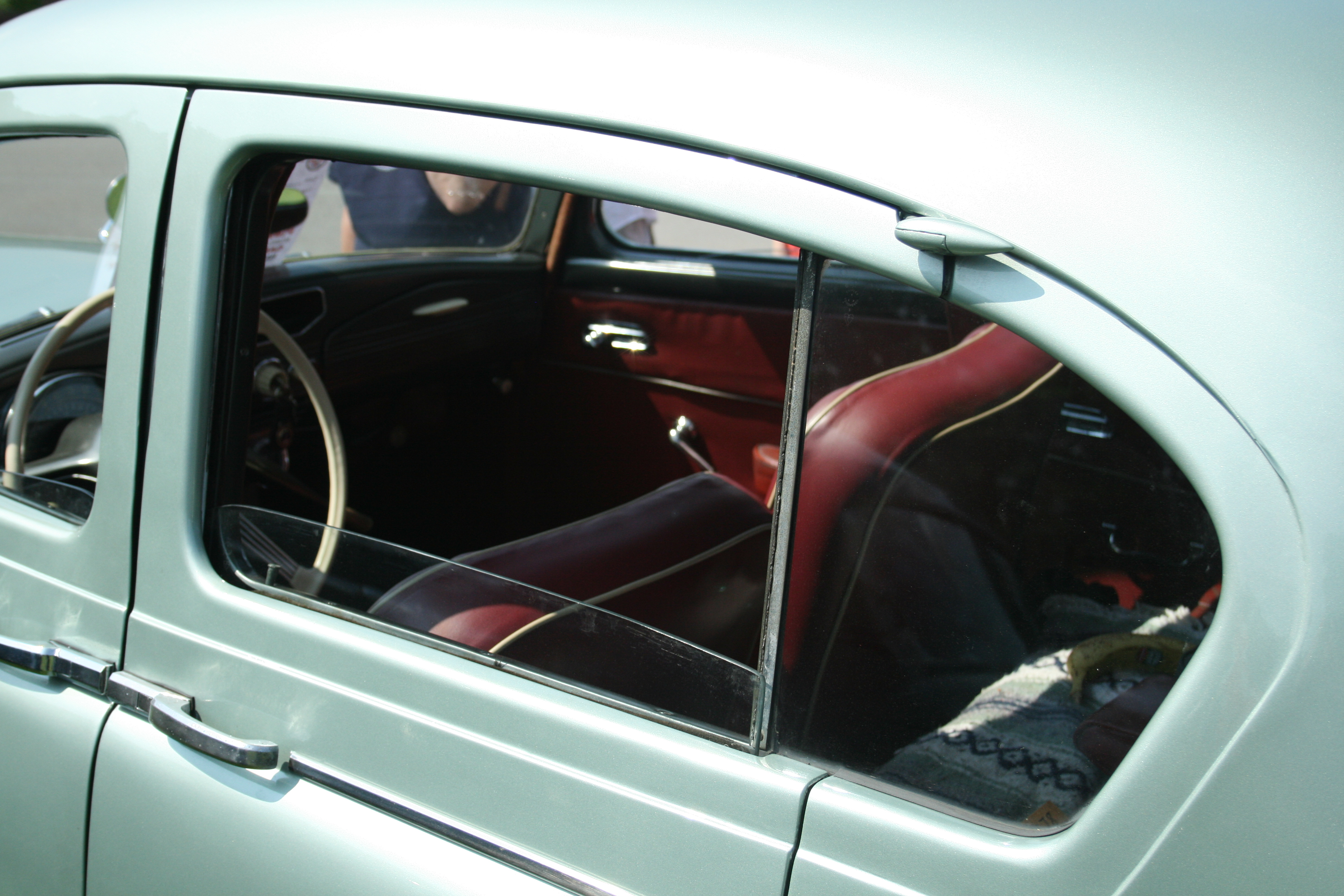
Sunbeam Talbot 90 with its family's "pillarless" rear window and distinctive reverse slope

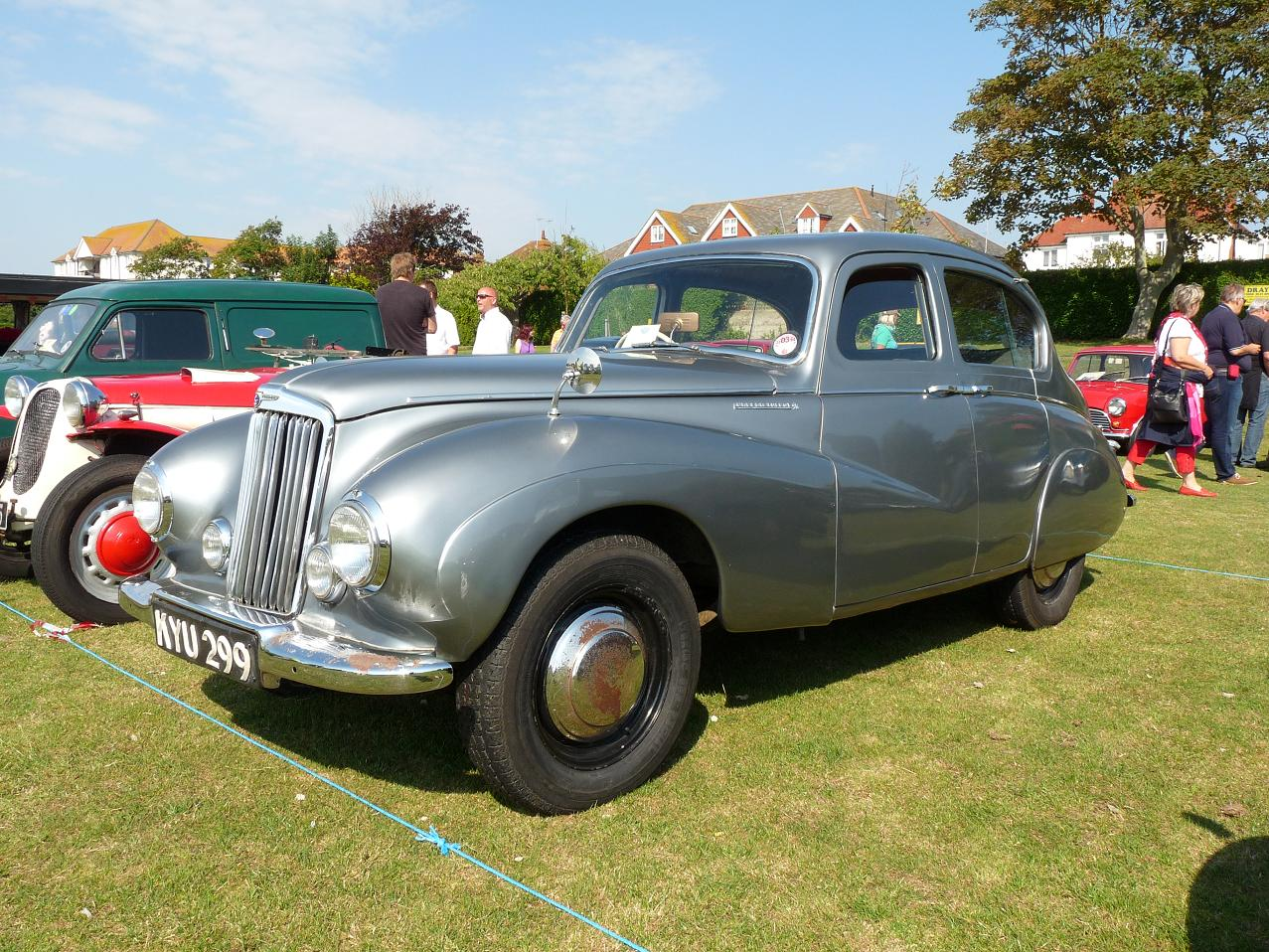
Sunbeam-Talbot 90 sports saloon

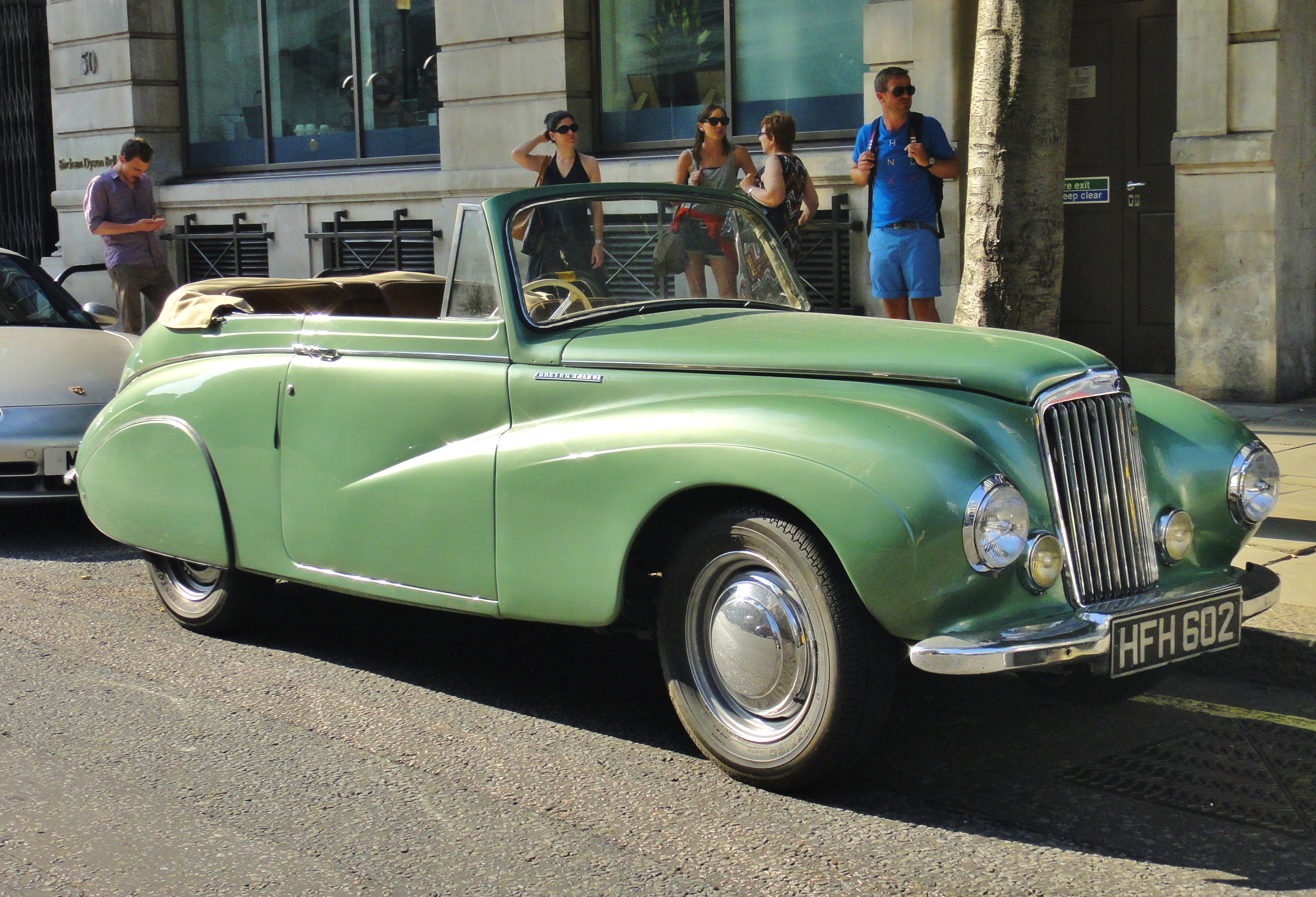
Sunbeam-Talbot 90 drophead coupé

Announced at the beginning of July 1948 this new car by then had been on display in New York, Boston and Toronto. The 1,944 cc four-cylinder engine was redesigned from the preceding Sunbeam-Talbot 2 Litre and still fundamentally the design of the 1937 Hillman 14 now badged Humber Hawk. Now the engine had been given a new cast-iron cylinder head holding overhead valves, the pushrods rising through the old valve guides. Output could now reach 64 bhp (48 kW) at 4100 rpm. The sports saloon weighs 26.25 cwt (2,940 lb; 1,334 kg) The chassis with beam axles and semi-elliptic leaf springs all round was scarcely changed from the same 2 Litre model but provided a wider track. The old basic Lockheed brakes were updated to hydraulic operation. The inevitable post war steering column gear-change proved one of the better versions of this new fad. Close-coupled sports saloon and drophead coupé bodies were fitted to the chassis and the rear wheel openings were covered by metal "spats".

The Times reported the 90 was fast, being capable of reaching 80 mph (130 km/h), (it was independently timed at 76.6 mph (123.3 km/h)), it was well-sprung and there was no wind-roar when cruising at 60 mph (97 km/h) to 70 mph (110 km/h). The intermediate gears were remarkably quiet. The steering column gear lever was light to operate but it required several tries to engage reverse. The springing was not up to the standard provided by the independent front suspension. The sports saloon on test leaked into the interior in several places. The tester liked the variable driving position, the seat height can also be adjusted. "This is one of the prettiest cars made today anywhere."

4,000 were made from 1948 until 1950.

== Sunbeam-Talbot 90 MkII (1950–1952) ==
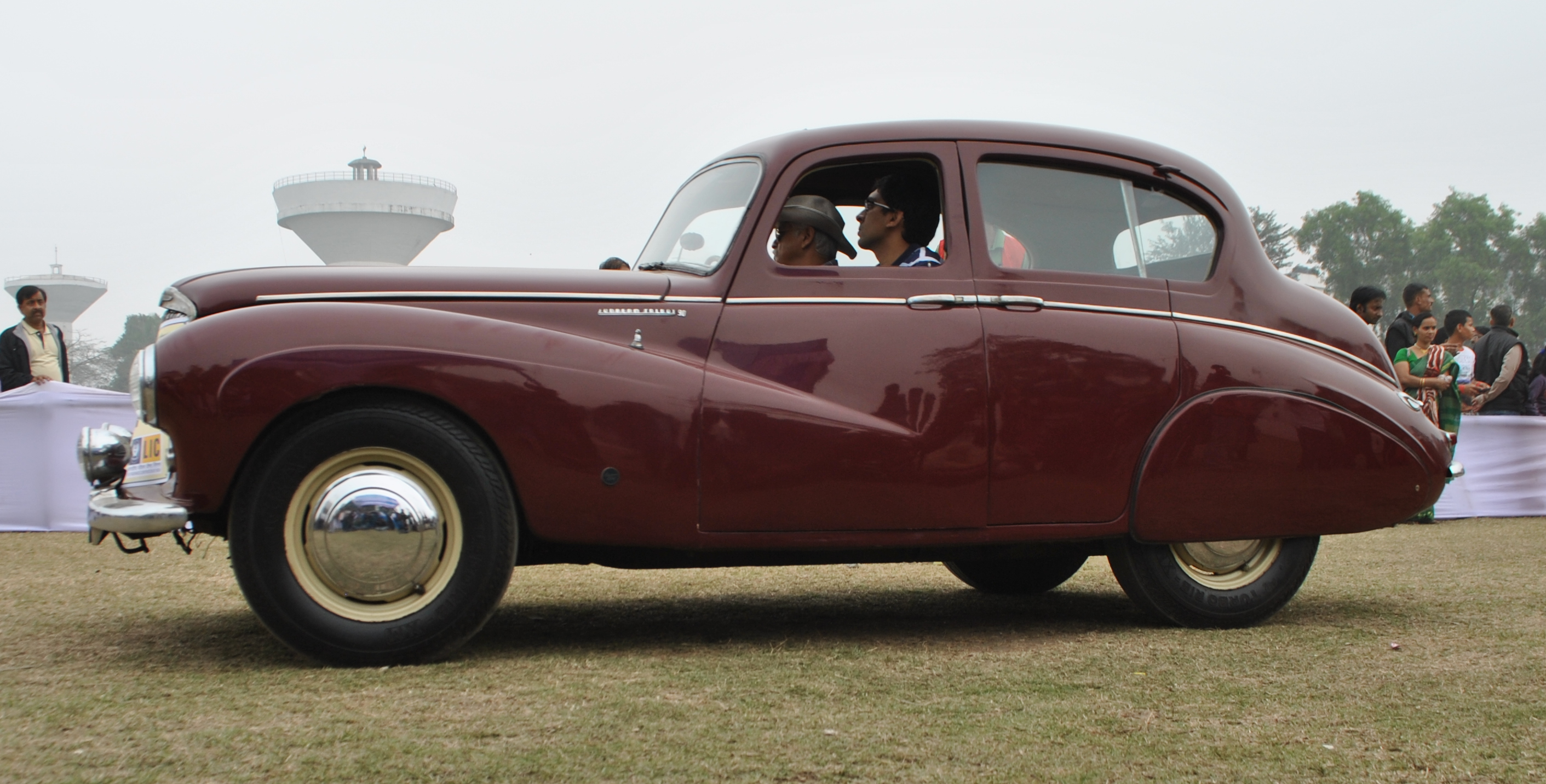
Sunbeam-Talbot 90 Mk II sports saloon

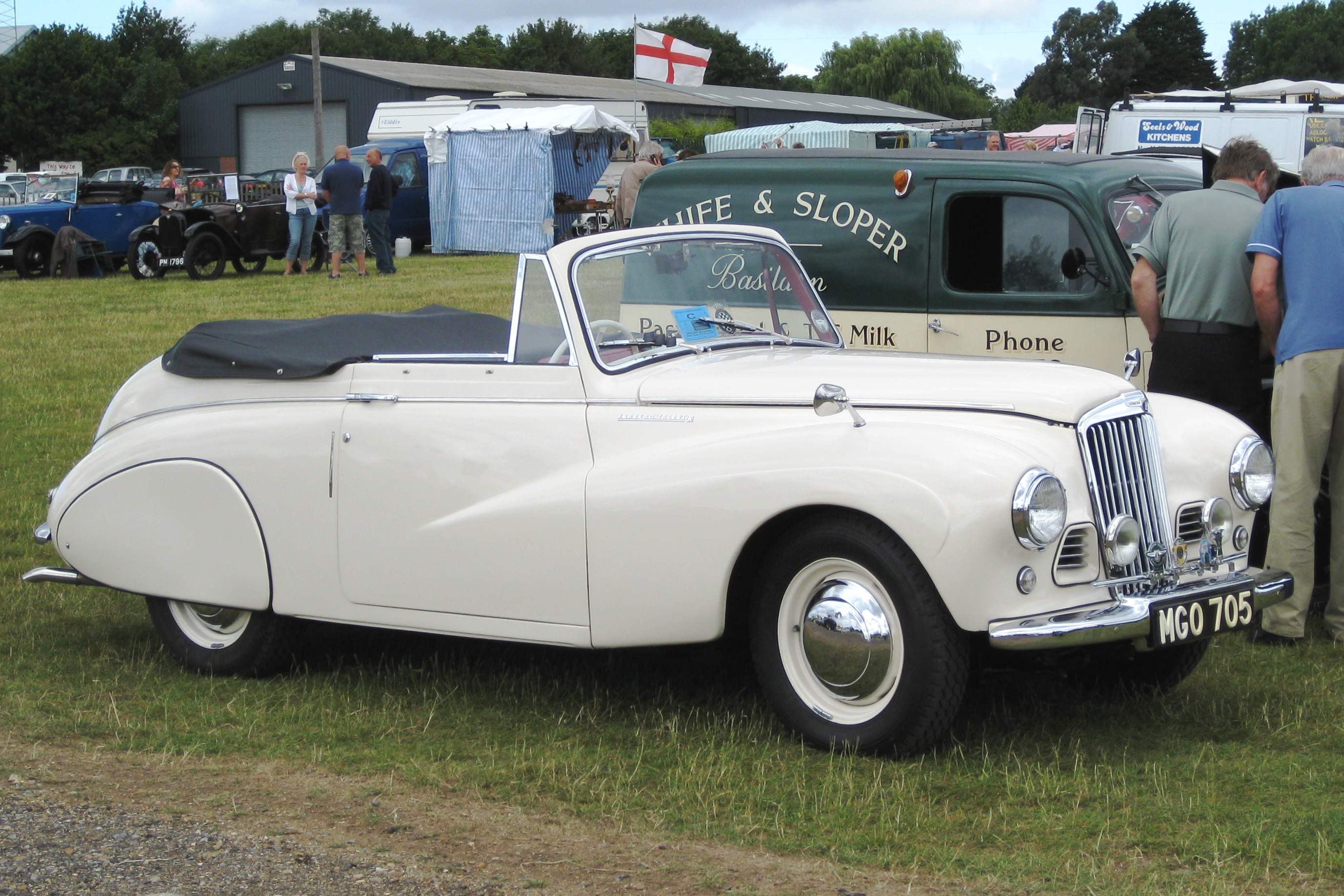
Sunbeam-Talbot 90 Mk II drophead coupé

For September 1950 and the Earls Court Motor Show the engine was enlarged to 2267 cc by increasing the bore ¼ inch from 75 mm to 81 mm. The increased engine block capacity was shared with the company's 1950 Humber Hawk but the Humber retained (until 1954) the old side-valve arrangement. The 90 engine now developed 70 bhp (52 kW), and could pull a higher rear axle ratio for more comfortable cruising. The new engine output compared with only 58 bhp (43 kW) for the Humber. The favourable power-to-weight ratio meant that the Talbot could be "geared quite high" and still provide impressive acceleration where needed for "quick overtaking".

The existing chassis was fitted with independent front suspension using coil springs mounted on a specially shaped new cross-member. For some time this improvement was fitted only to export cars.

The front of the 90's body was modified; the headlights were raised to meet international regulations and the fog and driving lights were moved and remounted to leave air inlet grilles on either side of the radiator.

A coupé tested by The Motor magazine in 1952 had a top speed of 85.2 mph (137.1 km/h) and could accelerate from 0-60 mph (97 km/h) in 20.2 seconds. A fuel consumption of 22.5 miles per imperial gallon (12.6 L/100 km; 18.7 mpg_{‑US}) was recorded. The test car cost £1393 including taxes.

5493 were made.

== Sunbeam-Talbot 90 MkIIA (1952–1954) ==
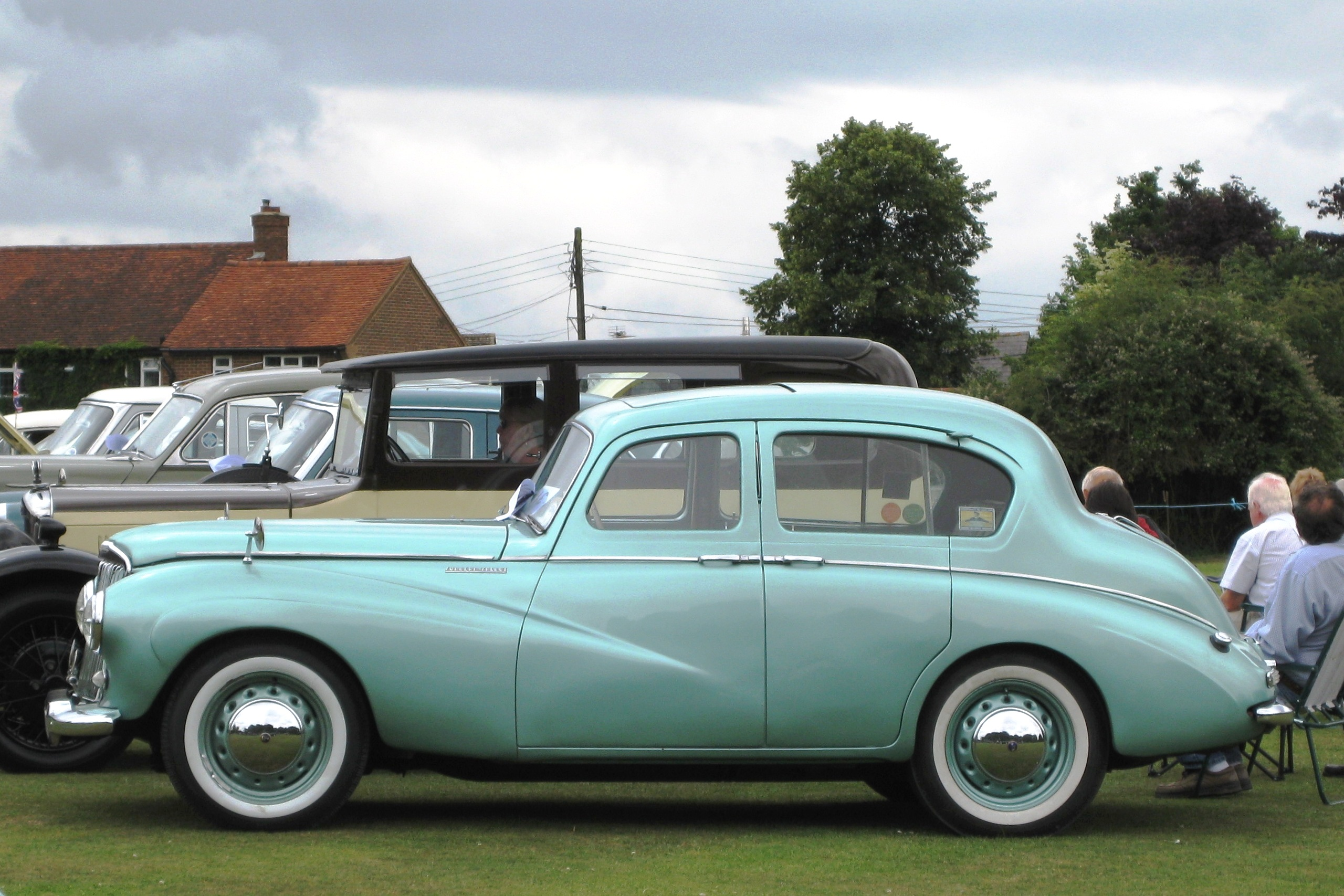
Sunbeam-Talbot 90 Mk IIA sports saloon pierced wheels without spats

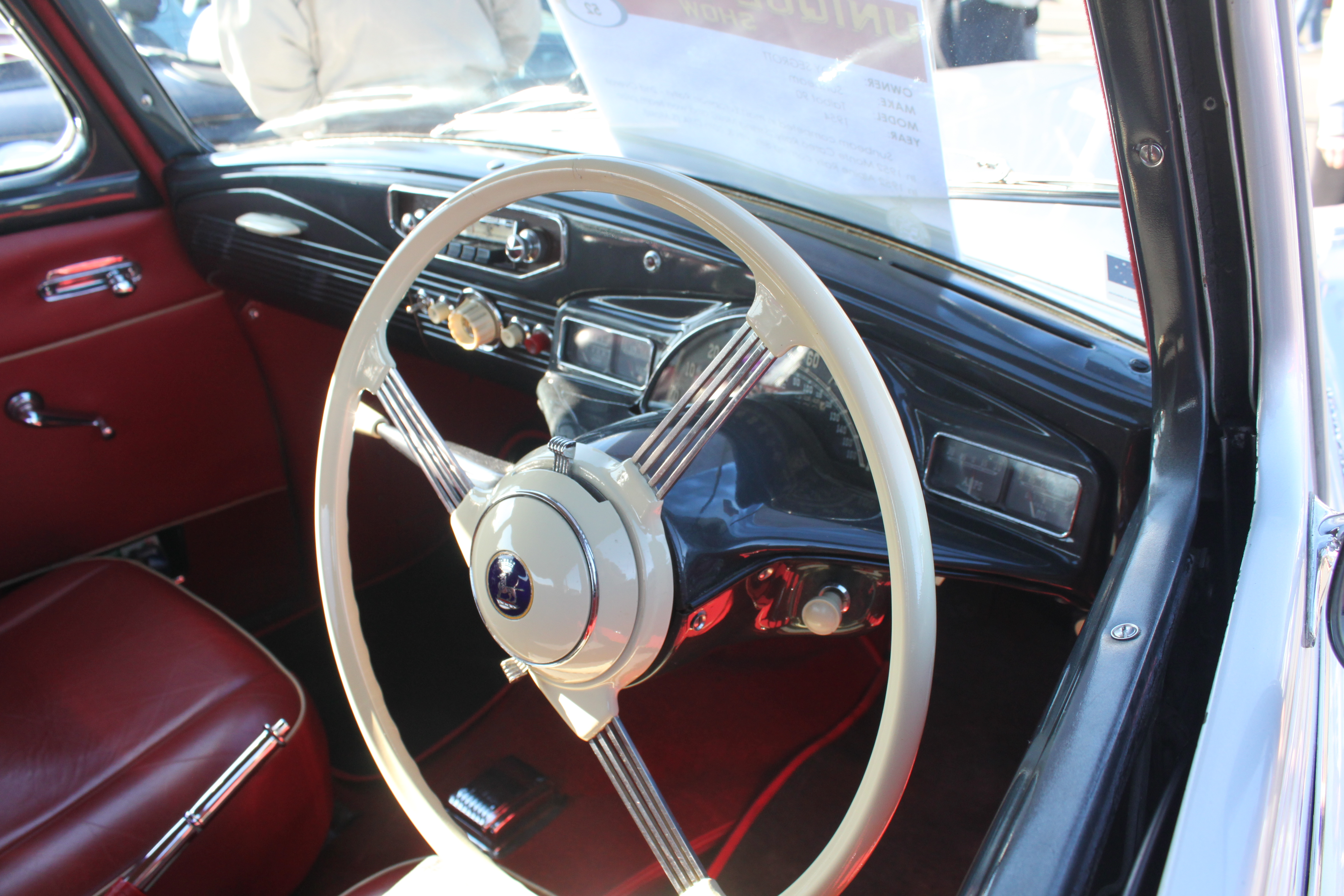

The Mk IIA had a higher compression engine raising output to 77 bhp (57 kW). To cater for the higher speeds the car was now capable of, the brakes were enlarged and to improve brake cooling the wheels were pierced.

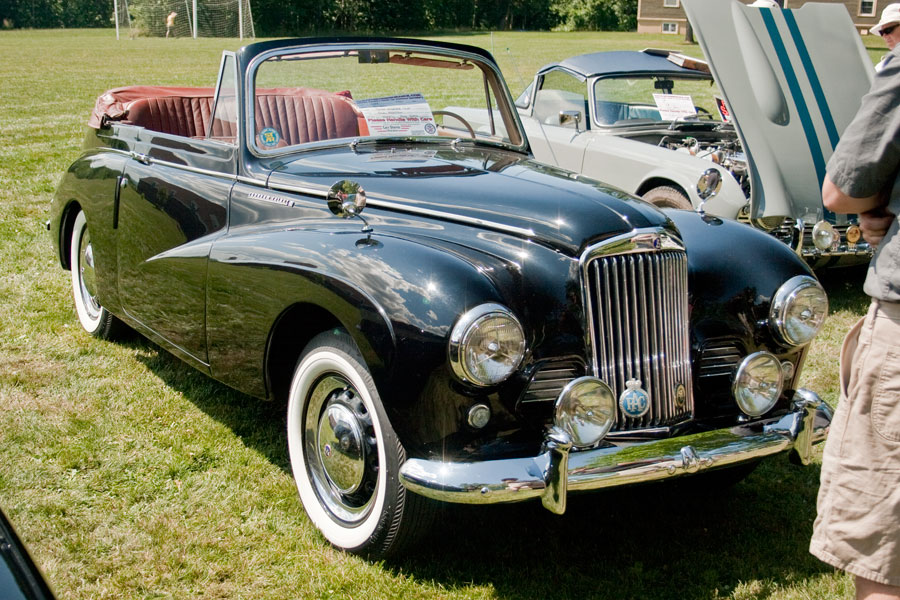
Sunbeam-Talbot 90 MkIIA drophead coupé

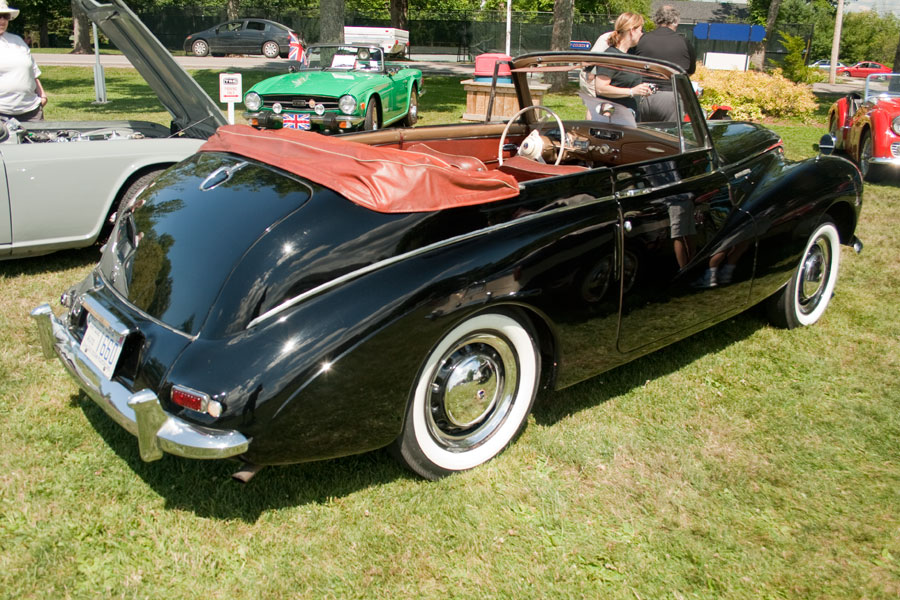
Sunbeam-Talbot 90 MkIIA drophead coupé

The Sunbeam-Talbot MkIIA drophead coupé/convertible is the rarest of the Sunbeam-Talbots.

The rear wheel spats were no longer fitted. 10,888 were made between 1952 and 1954.

== Sunbeam Mk III (1954–1957) ==
Sunbeam Mk III
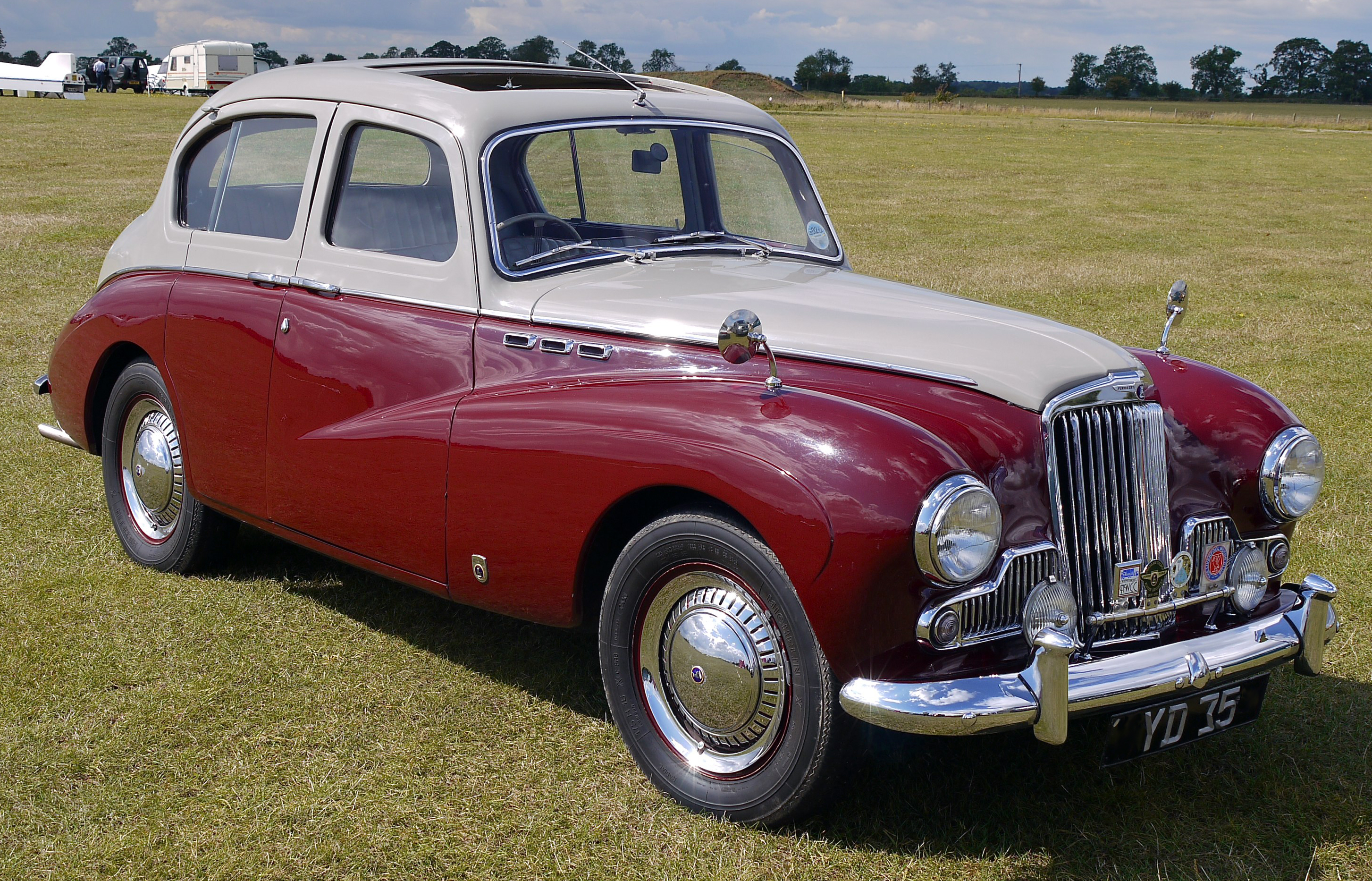
- 1956 Sunbeam Mk III

Overview
- Manufacturer: Rootes Group
- Production: 1954–1957; 2,250 built
- Assembly: United Kingdom; Australia

Body and chassis
- Class: Compact executive car (D)
- Body style: 4-door saloon 2-door drophead coupe

Powertrain
- Engine: 2267 cc Straight-4

Chronology
- Predecessor: Sunbeam-Talbot 90

From 1954 to 1957 the car continued, but without the Talbot name and was marketed as the Sunbeam MkIII and badged on the radiator shell as Sunbeam Supreme. The drophead coupé was not made after 1955.

There were some minor styling changes to the front with enlarged air intakes on each side of the radiator shell and three small portholes just below each side of the bonnet near to the windscreen. Duo-tone paint schemes were also available. Engine power was increased to 80 bhp (60 kW) and overdrive became an option.

A Mk III tested by The Motor magazine in 1955 had a top speed of 93.6 mph (150.6 km/h) and could accelerate from 0-60 mph (97 km/h) in 17.4 seconds. A fuel consumption of 22.1 miles per imperial gallon (12.8 L/100 km; 18.4 mpg_{‑US}) was recorded. The test car cost £1191 including taxes.

The main Rootes Group dealers in Leicester, Castles of Leicester, offered a conversion that moved the gearchange to the transmission tunnel, modified the cylinder head, fitted a bonnet air scoop and changed the way the boot lid opened. These models were not connected with the Sunbeam factory but are sometimes referred to as the Mk IIIS. Some 30-40 cars were modified. The revised gearchange was also offered as an after market accessory and was suitable for fitting to earlier models also.

Approximately 2250 were made.

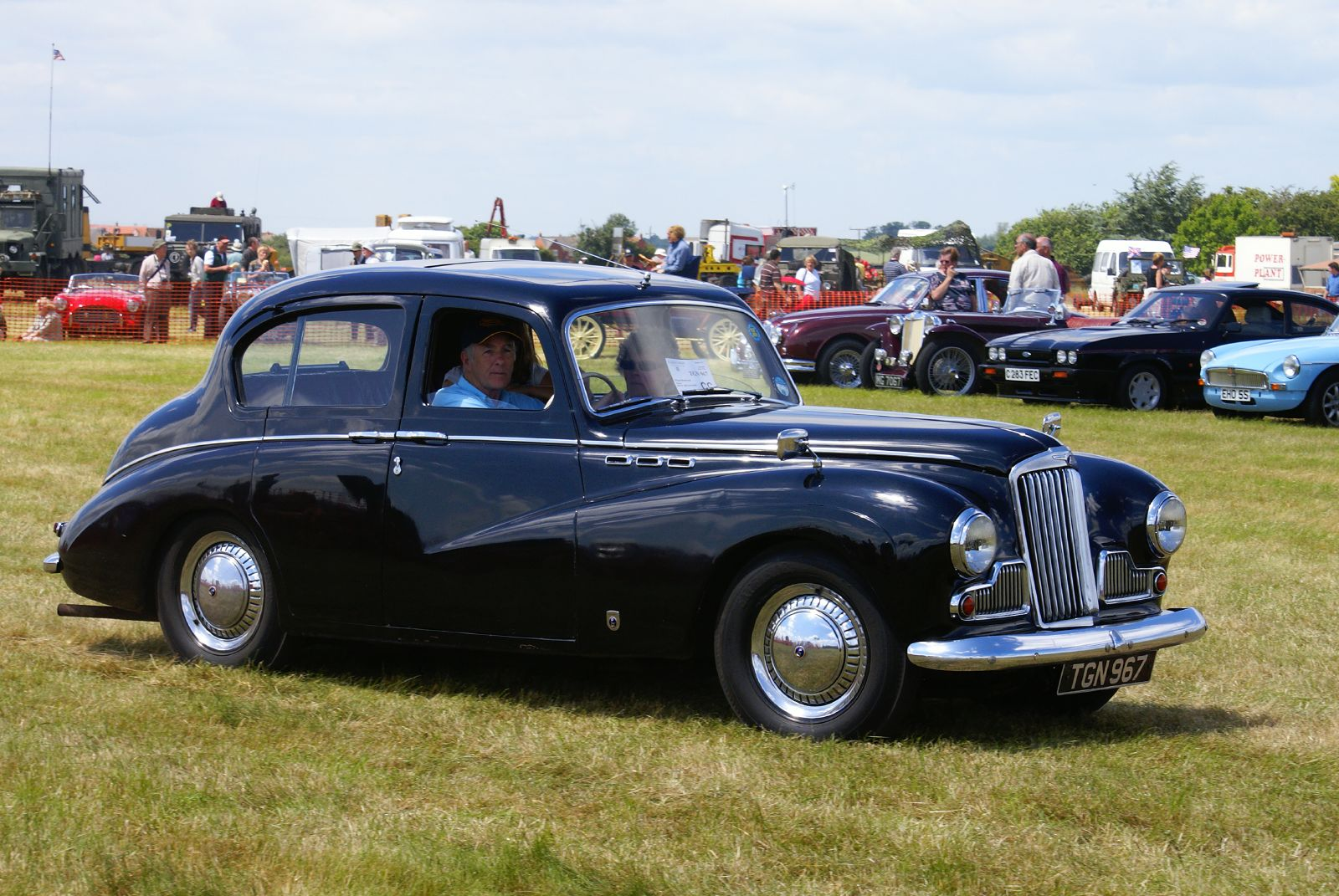
Sunbeam Mk III Saloon

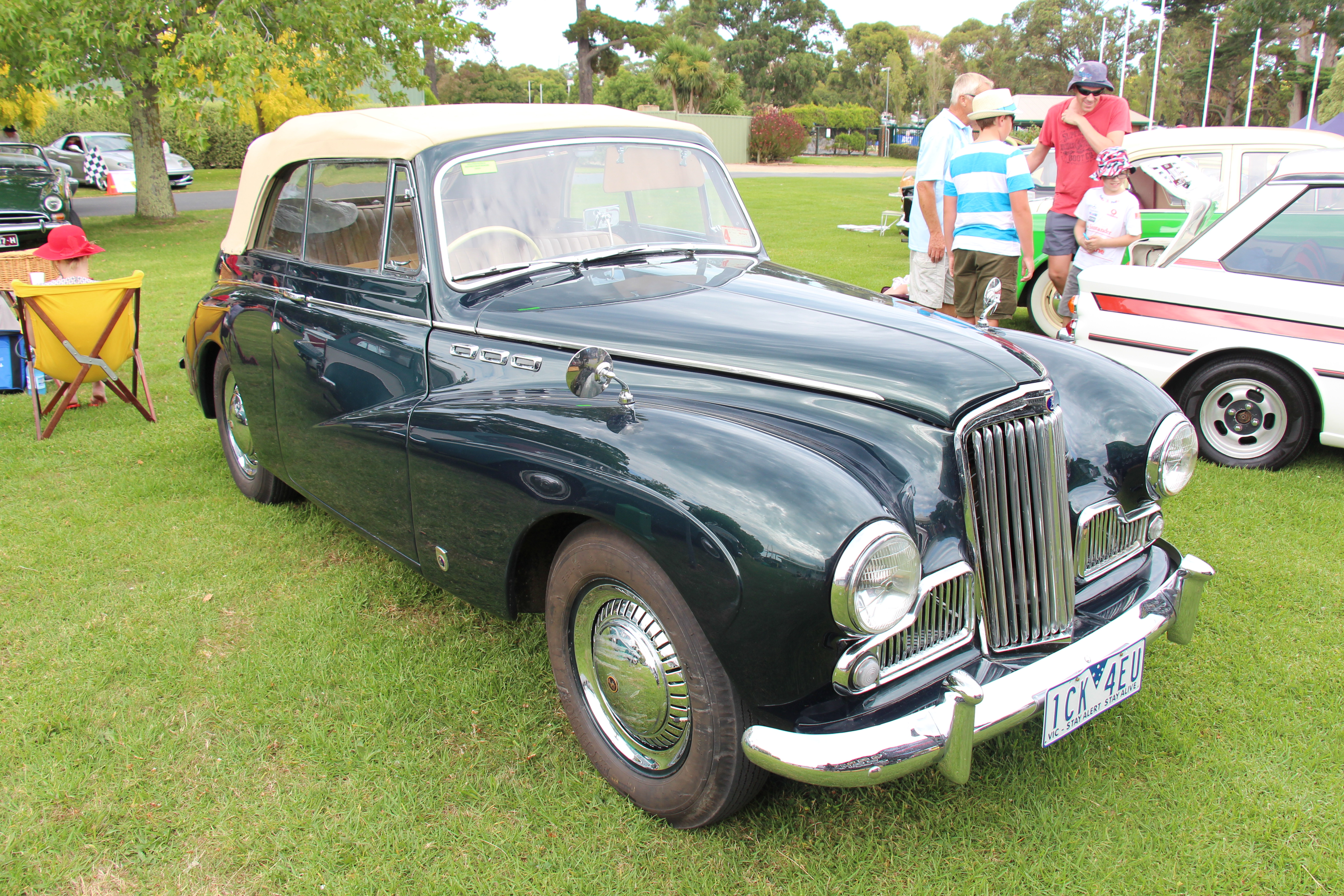
Sunbeam Mk III Drophead Coupe

== Sporting achievements ==
A Mk II was driven by Stirling Moss, Desmond Scannell and John Cooper to take second place in the 1952 Monte Carlo Rally.

A Sunbeam Mk III was outright winner of the 1955 Monte Carlo Rally.

In the Alpine Rally, Stirling Moss won a 'Coupe d'Or' (Gold cup) for three consecutive penalty-free runs in 1952, 1953 and 1954. The first in a Sunbeam-Talbot 90 Mk II and the latter two in the Sunbeam Alpine derivative. The Sunbeam-Talbot team of Mk IIs won the team prize in 1952.

A Mk III was the first car driven competitively by Jim Clark in driving tests and sprints around the Borders area of southern Scotland where he lived. Clark went on to become twice Formula 1 World Champion before being killed in a Formula 2 Race at Hockenheim in 1968. He is revered as being one of the best racing drivers of all time.

== In popular culture ==
A 1951 Sunbeam-Talbot 90 Drophead Coupé regularly appears as Bunty's car in British TV series "Father Brown" (2013). http://pics.imcdb.org/558/series5ep5-443_0312.jpg
