= Sunbeam-Talbot 80 =

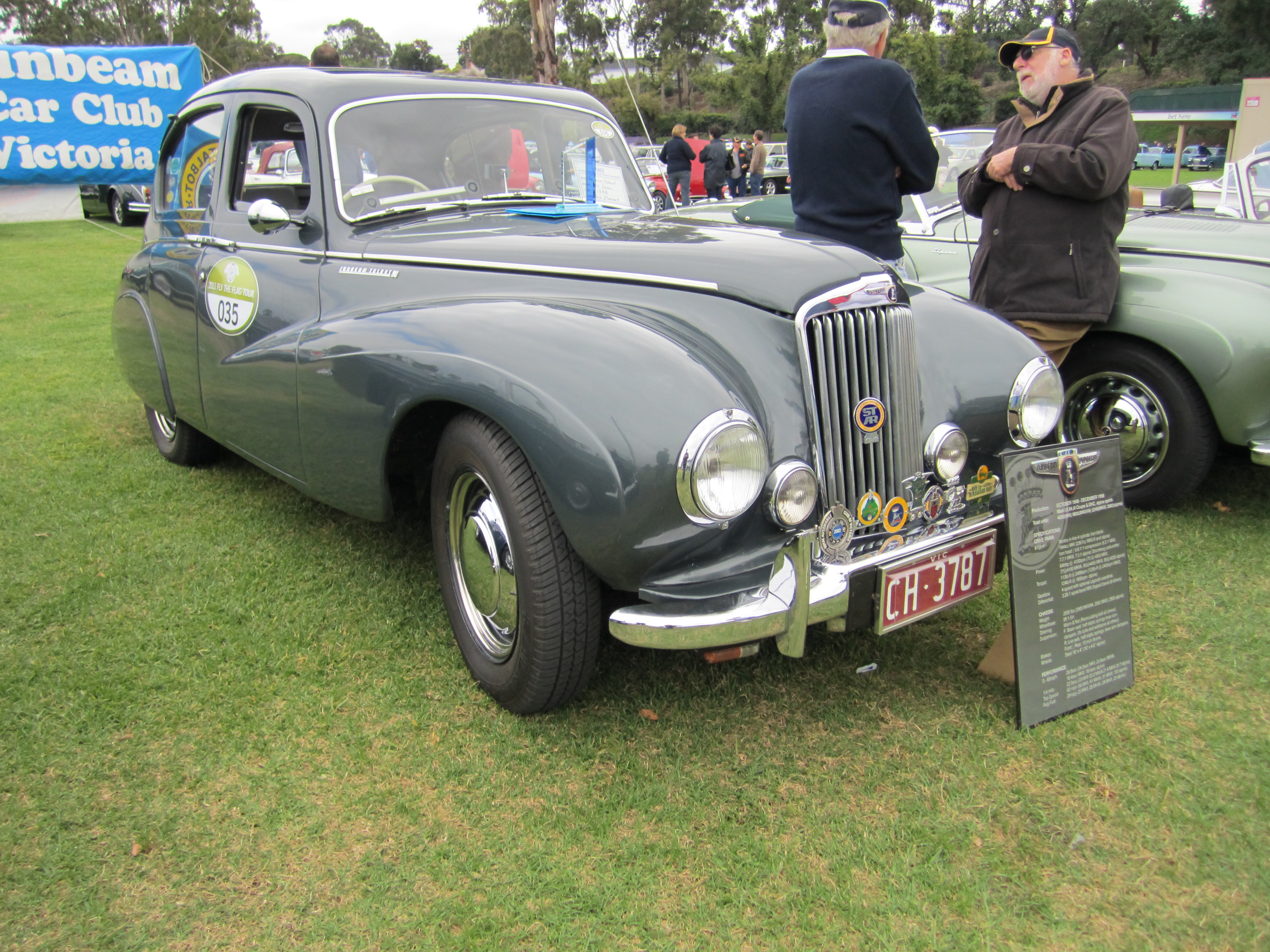
- Sunbeam-Talbot 80 sports saloon

Overview
- Manufacturer: Sunbeam-Talbot
- Production: 1948–1950; 3,500 built

Body and chassis
- Body style: 4-door sports saloon 2-door drophead coupé
- Related: Sunbeam-Talbot 90

Powertrain
- Engine: 1185 cc Straight-4

Chronology
- Predecessor: Sunbeam-Talbot Ten
- Successor: Sunbeam Rapier

The Sunbeam-Talbot 80 is a 4-door 4-light sports saloon which was produced by English manufacturer Sunbeam-Talbot from 1948 to 1950.

The 80 was introduced in July 1948 as an entirely new body for the Sunbeam-Talbot Ten. As before sports saloon and drophead coupé bodies were offered. It was fitted with an overhead valve revision of the Minx / Ten's 1,185 cc four cylinder engine developing 47 bhp (35 kW) at 4800 rpm. The new cast-iron cylinder head with its overhead valves shared just its design with the 2 Litre 90, the cylinder blocks were not the same. From the Ten to the 80 the carburettor switched sides. Commentators noticed that between the speeds of 30 mph (48 km/h) and 60 mph (97 km/h) the much larger engined 90 consumed less fuel.

All other dimensions were shared with the 90.

The 80 was discontinued in September 1950 with 3,500 examples having been produced.

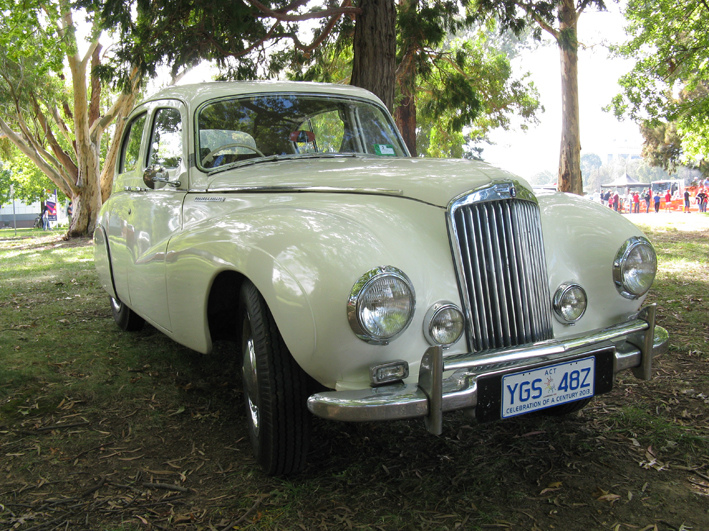
Sunbeam-Talbot 80 sports saloon

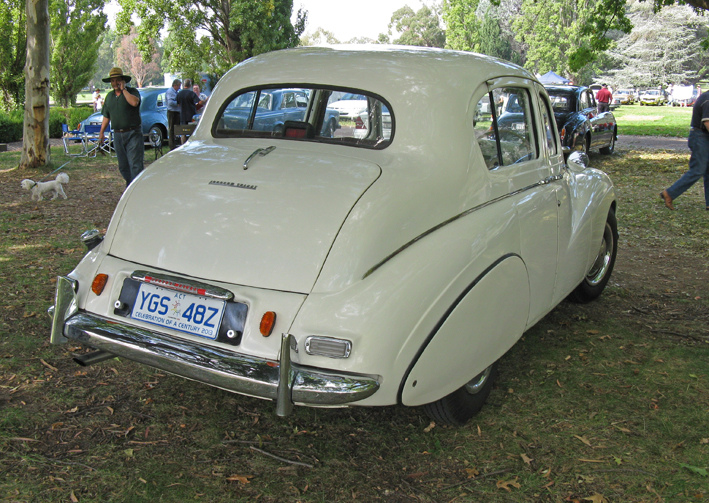
Sunbeam-Talbot 80 sports saloon
