= Sunbeam-Talbot 2 Litre =

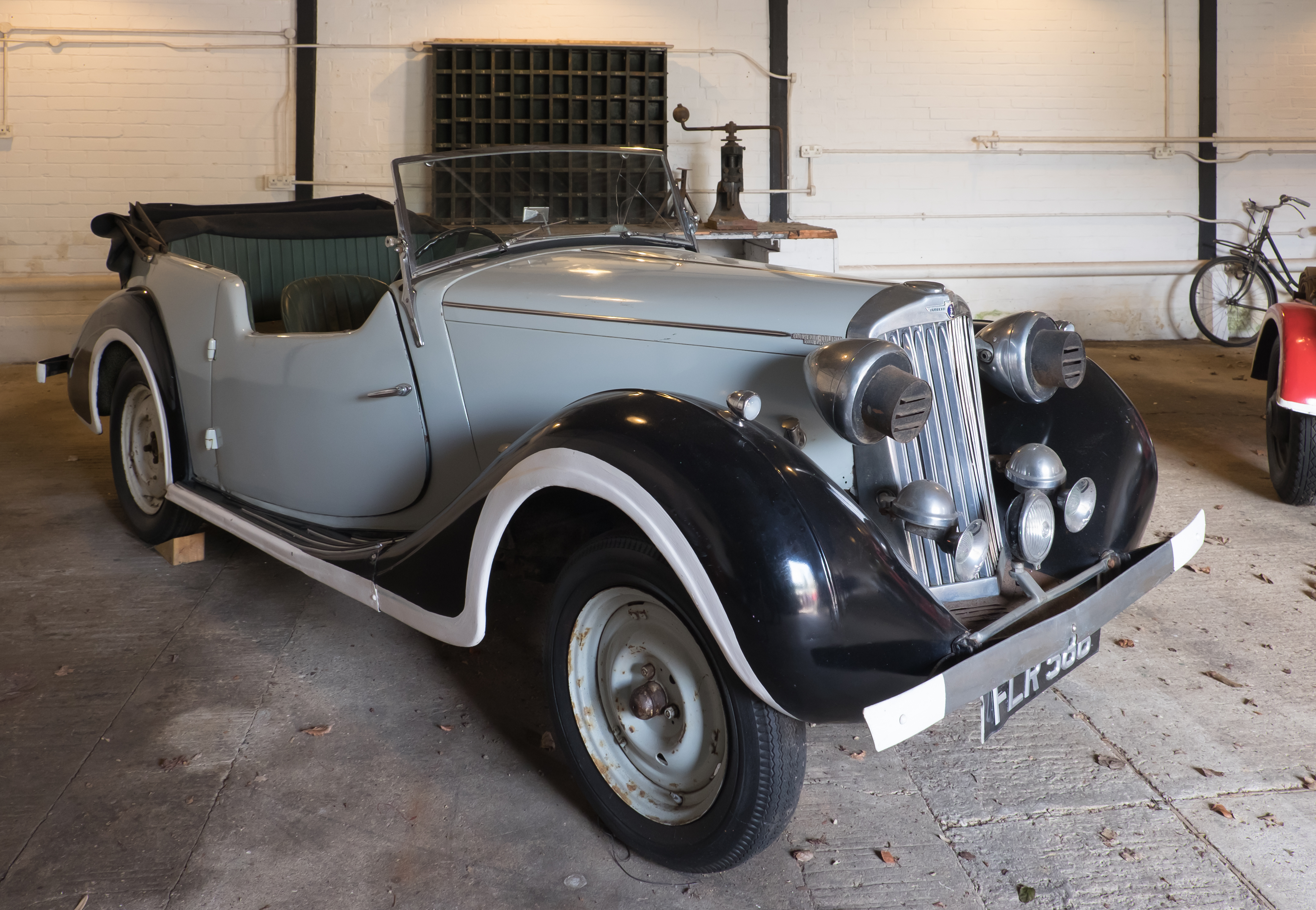
- 1947 Sunbeam-Talbot 2 Litre sports tourer

Overview
- Manufacturer: Sunbeam-Talbot (Rootes Group)
- Also called: Sunbeam-Talbot Two Litre
- Production: 1939–1948; 1,306 produced
- Assembly: London, United Kingdom; Ryton, United Kingdom

Body and chassis
- Body style: 4 door saloon drophead coupé tourer
- Layout: FR layout
- Related: Sunbeam-Talbot Ten

Powertrain
- Engine: 1944cc I4

Chronology
- Predecessor: None
- Successor: Sunbeam-Talbot 90

The Sunbeam-Talbot 2 Litre is an automobile which was manufactured by Sunbeam-Talbot in the United Kingdom from 1939 until 1948. It was offered in 4-light sports saloon, foursome drophead coupé and 4-seater sports tourer body styles as well as a sports 2-seater. Production was suspended due to the Second World War and was resumed in 1945.

The 2 Litre utilised the styling and chassis of the Sunbeam-Talbot Ten with a wheelbase which was 3½ inches longer than the Ten. It was fitted with the 1944cc four cylinder sidevalve engine from the Hillman 14, that unit producing 52 bhp in its original form with improvements after the war increasing the power output to 56 bhp. The 2 Litre was fitted with Lockheed hydraulic brakes.

1,306 examples of the 2 Litre had been produced by 1948, in which year it was replaced by the Sunbeam-Talbot 90.

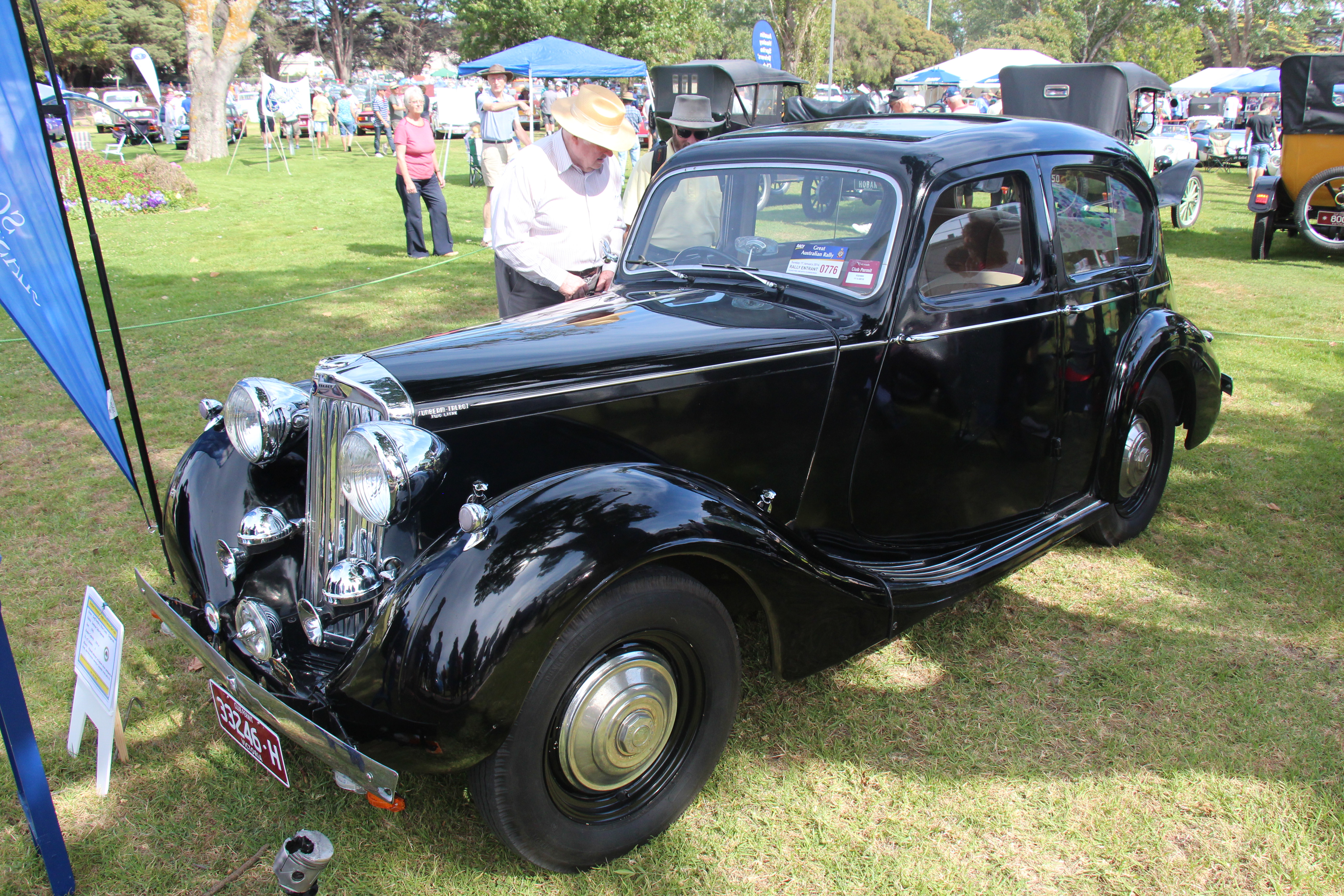
Sunbeam-Talbot 2 Litre Sports Saloon
