= Sunbeam-Talbot =

British automobile manufacturer

Sunbeam-Talbot Limited
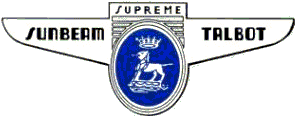
- Type: Subsidiary
- Industry: Automotive
- Predecessor: Clément-Talbot
- Founded: 1938
- Founders: William and Reginald Rootes
- Defunct: 1954; 72 years ago
- Headquarters: London, UK
- Products: Automobiles
- Brands: Sunbeam; Talbot
- Parent: Rootes Group

Sunbeam-Talbot Limited was a British motor manufacturing business. It built upmarket sports-saloon versions under the parenthood of Rootes Group cars from 1938 to 1954. Its predecessor Clément-Talbot Limited had made Talbot automobiles from 1902 to 1935.

Clément-Talbot was bought by Rootes brothers in January 1935 and re-organised to make Rootes Group cars also branded Talbot.

In 1938 after some years of consideration the Rootes brothers dropped plans to make large luxury cars branded Sunbeam, added the name Sunbeam to Talbot and put the extra name on both the cars built in Kensal Green and the company building them.

After the Second World War Sunbeam-Talbot production was resumed in London then in Spring 1946 it was moved to Rootes' new factory at Ryton-on-Dunsmore, Warwickshire and Clément-Talbot's North Kensington works became a Rootes administration and service centre.

== Background history: predecessors ==
=== Clément-Talbot ===
Until acquired by Rootes in 1935 this North Kensington business had manufactured "thoroughbred" high quality Talbot cars and limousines. When it began in 1902 the company's name was Clément-Talbot Limited and it kept that name until 1938 when it was changed to Sunbeam-Talbot. Initially an independent public listed company on the London Stock Exchange, Clément-Talbot was bought in 1919 by A Darracq and Co. Later, in 1920, Darracq bought control of Wolverhampton's Sunbeam Motor Car Company Limited but kept all identities quite separate. In August 1920 Darracq was renamed S T D Motors Limited to recognise the gathering together of Sunbeam Talbot and Darracq under one ownership.

Badges used by Clément-Talbot

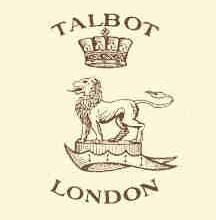

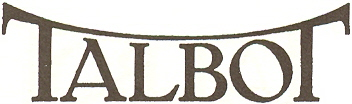

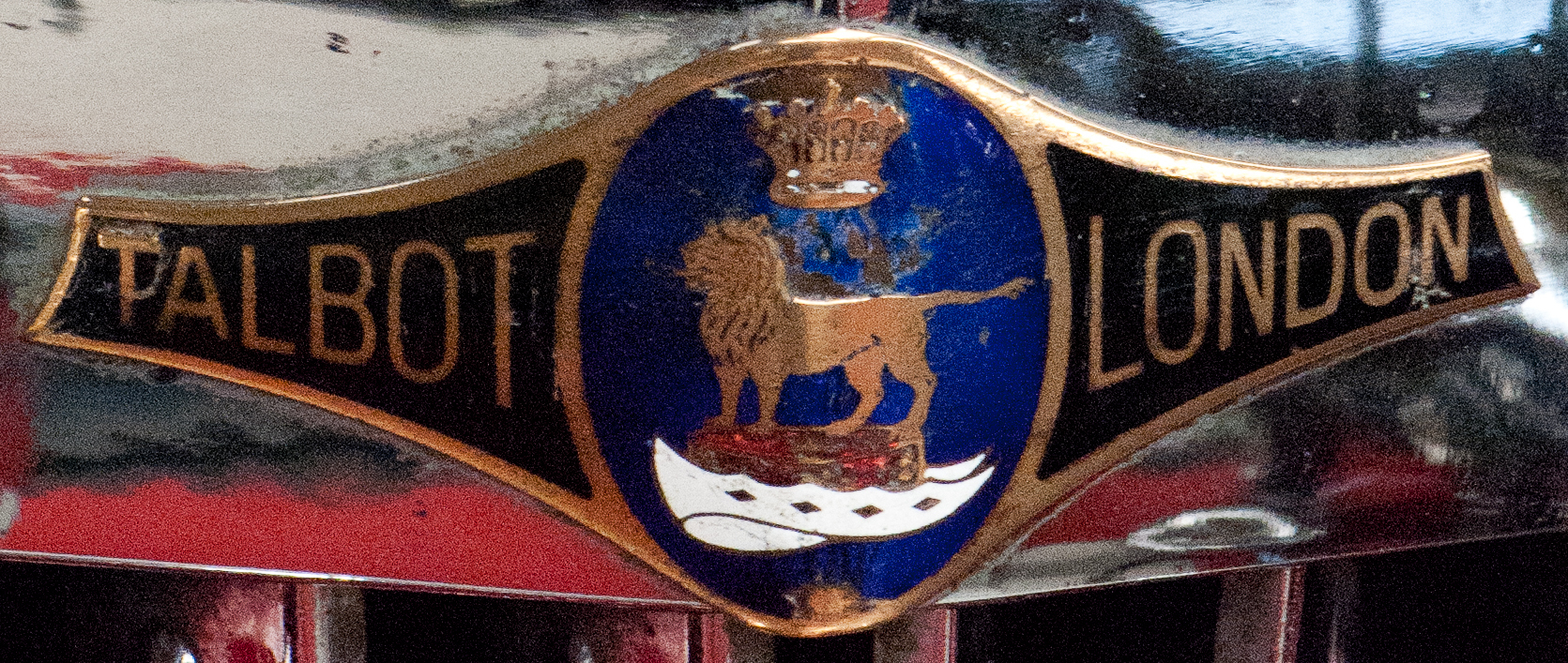

in late 1934 S T D Motors was obliged to sell Wolverhampton's loss-making Sunbeam and North Kensington's then profit-making Talbot and they were bought by the Rootes brothers. A provisional agreement with Rootes Securities was reached in January 1935 and from that point Rootes controlled Clément-Talbot. In the summer of 1935 Rootes Securities announced they had bought Sunbeam Motor Cars. Sunbeam designs had not been brought up to date and Wolverhampton's production ended. During 1937 Humber Limited, controlled by Rootes, bought Clément-Talbot Limited and Sunbeam Motors Limited, which continued to build buses, from Rootes Securities Limited.

=== Automobiles Talbot ===
S T D Motors in 1922 had finally dropped Darracq from the name of its French subsidiary replacing it with Talbot. But they continued to import the French cars and when they were sold in Britain those cars were badged Darracq-Talbot or Talbot-Darracq or just Darracq. By the time this former Clément-Talbot London business was bought by Rootes the two manufacturers of Talbots no longer had any connection at all and in any case continued to manufacture wholly unrelated vehicles.

=== Talbot London ===
Although Talbots had been selling well the expensive London Talbot designs were dropped from production during 1936, since the new ownership had taken effect they had been steadily incorporating more and more Humber parts, and replaced with much cheaper simpler Rootes Group designs intended for a quite different much larger market. From late 1935, capitalising on the high reputation of the brand name Talbot, the Clément-Talbot North Kensington plant made mid-range upgraded versions of their Hillman and Humber cars for Rootes and branded them Talbot. To begin Talbot's well-known chief engineer and designer Georges Roesch came up with a modified Hillman Aero Minx for the October 1935 Motor Show and it was branded Talbot Ten.

== History: Sunbeam-Talbot company ==
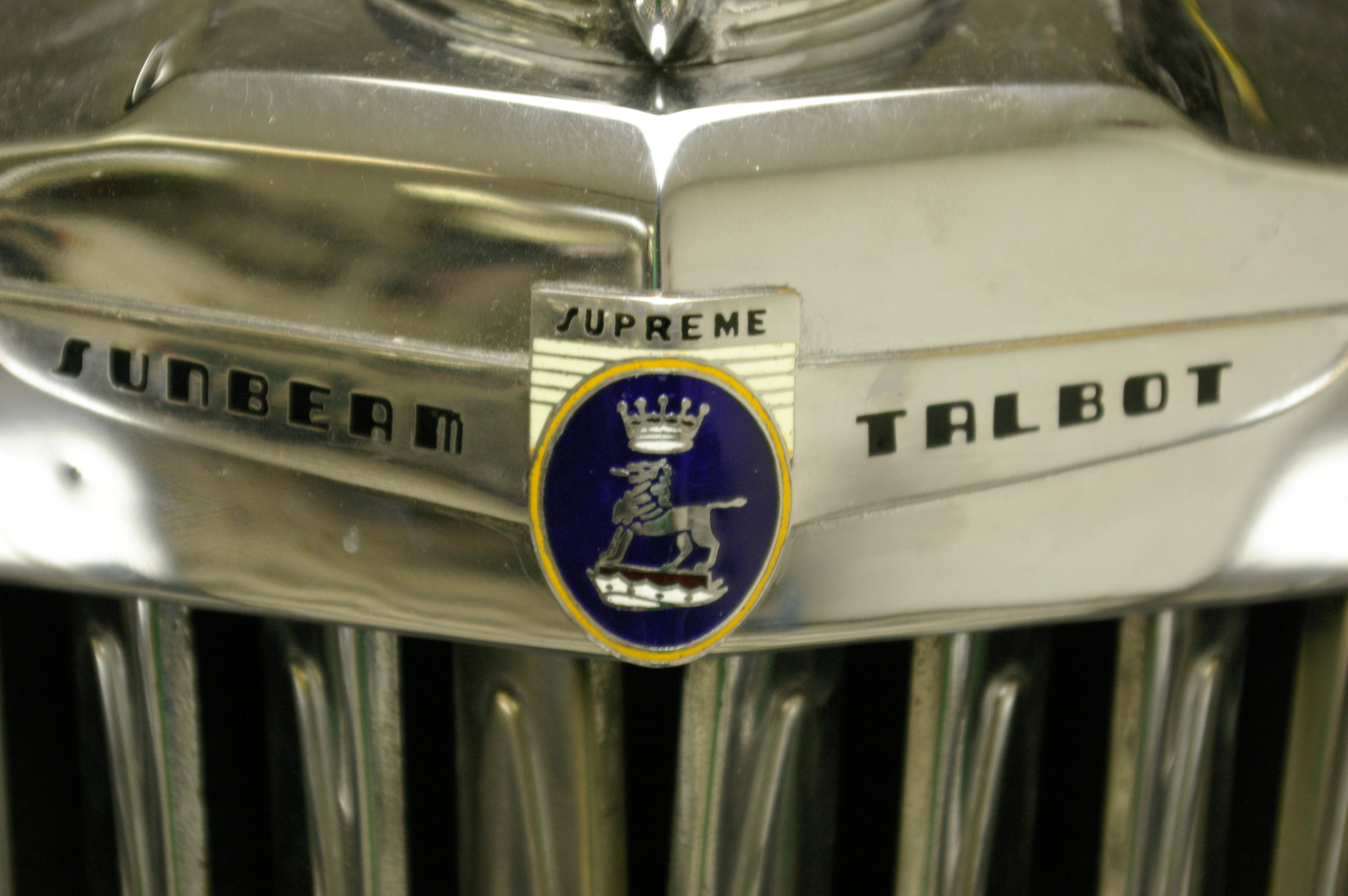
Sunbeam-Talbot radiator badge

Although the intention had been to continue the Sunbeam name on a large and expensive car almost four years after Rootes bought Sunbeam it was announced Sunbeam Motors and Clément-Talbot were now combined under Clément-Talbot Limited, since renamed Sunbeam-Talbot Limited, and would continue to produce good quality cars at reasonable prices.

Until the Second World War Sunbeam-Talbot cars were made in the Clément-Talbot premises in North Kensington, London with its aging machinery. Those works repaired aero engines during the war and, though production of the prewar models resumed in London, in Spring 1946 Sunbeam-Talbot production was shifted to Rootes' new factory at Ryton-on-Dunsmore, Warwickshire and the North Kensington buildings became a Rootes administration and service centre.

The first two models were the Sunbeam-Talbot Ten (previously the Talbot Ten); and the 3 Litre. They were modified Hillman-Talbots or Humber-Talbots radiatored and badged as Sunbeam-Talbots for the October 1938 Motor Show. The new 3 Litre car was a combination of then-current 3 Litre Hillman Hawk, later re-badged Humber Snipe, in a better finished Hillman/Humber body with distinctive rear side-windows.

The Ten was launched in August 1938, and was an upgrade from the previous Talbot Ten, itself an upgrade of the Hillman Aero-Minx. Purists described the new car as "a Hillman Minx in a party frock". It had a 1185 cc sidevalve Minx unit engine with an alloy head, and a chassis that had its origins in that used in the Hillman Aero Minx. The Ten was available with four-door saloon, sports tourer bodywork and drophead coupe.

The Sunbeam-Talbot 2 Litre was introduced in 1939 and was based on the Ten, though it used the 1944 cc sidevalve engine from the Hillman 14 later Humber Hawk. Due to the advent of World War II, these models were rare. They were available in the same bodywork as the Ten. The Sunbeam-Talbot 3 Litre was available as a saloon, sports saloon, sports tourer and drophead coupé. Another new model for 1939 was the 4 Litre, a 3 Litre car with a 4086 cc sidevalve six and alloy head engine of the Humber Super Snipe. It was also supplied as a touring limousine.

These models continued to be listed after the War until 1948. However, materials were short at that time, and it has been reported that "all the [3 and 4 Litre] engines were needed for the big Humbers", so that Sunbeam-Talbot production was in reality virtually or entirely restricted, post-1945, to the Minx-based 10 and the 2 Litre.

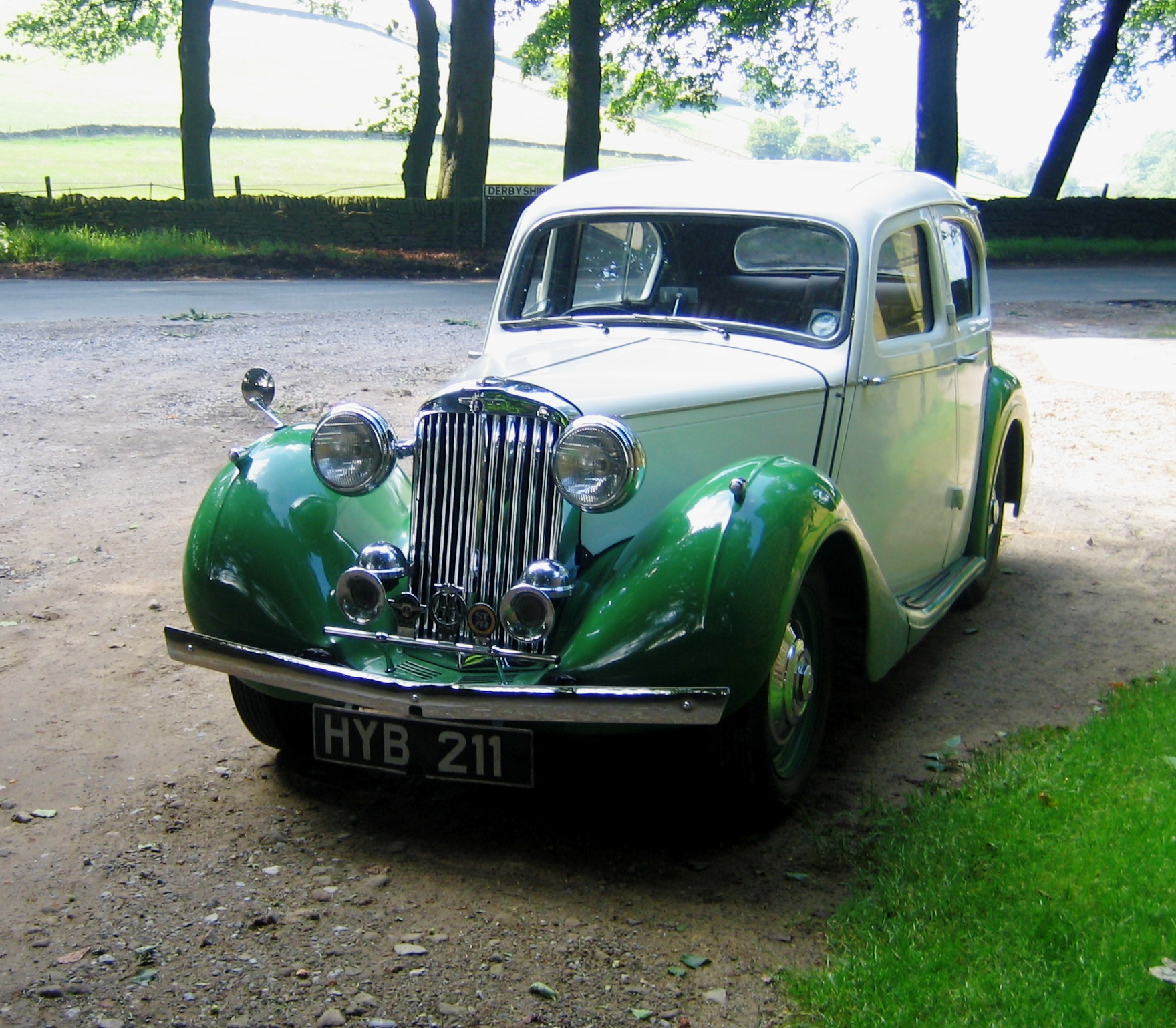
Ten 4-light 4-door sports saloon 1946 "a Hillman Minx in a party frock"

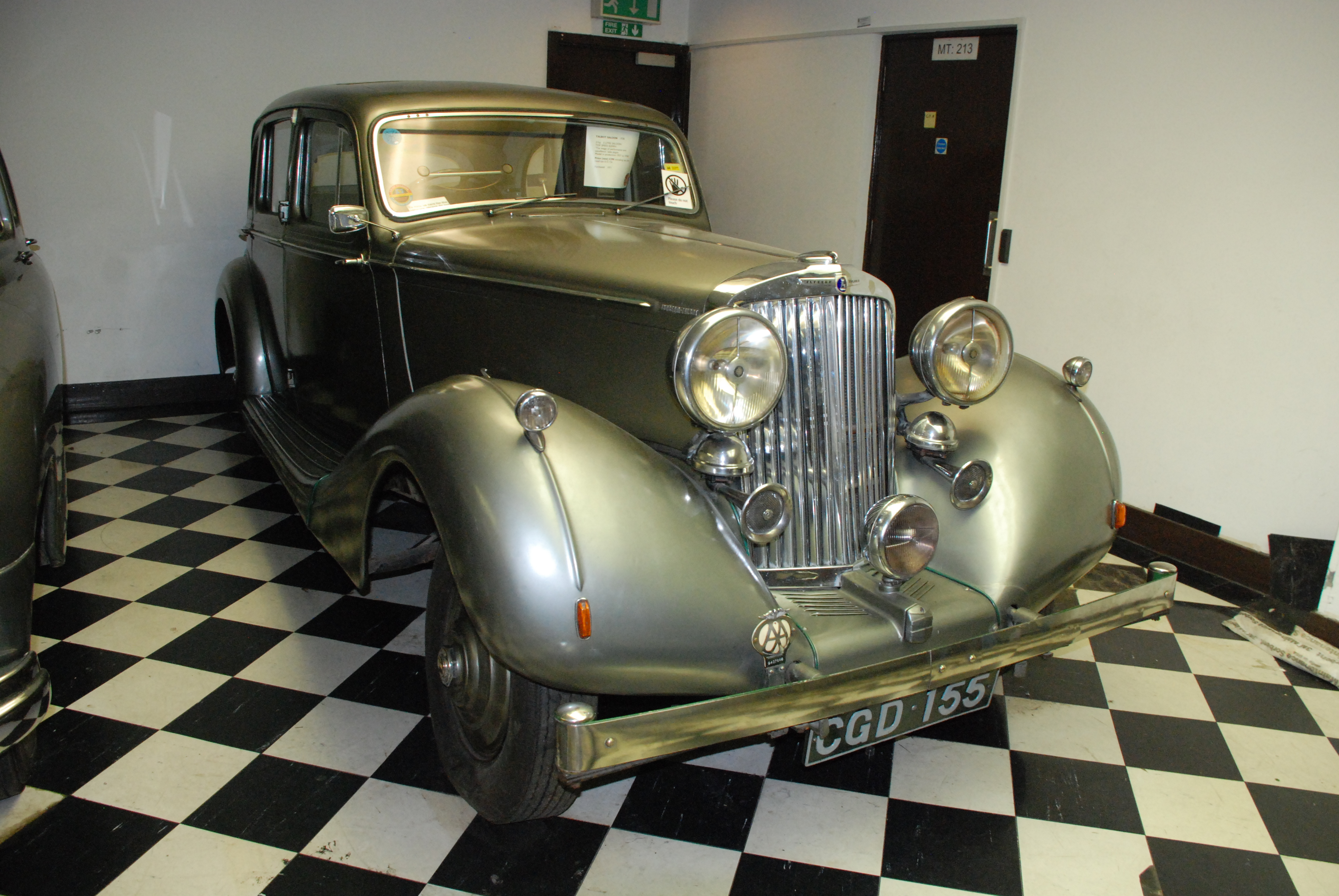
3-litre 6-light 4-door sports saloon 1939 re-badged Hillman Hawk

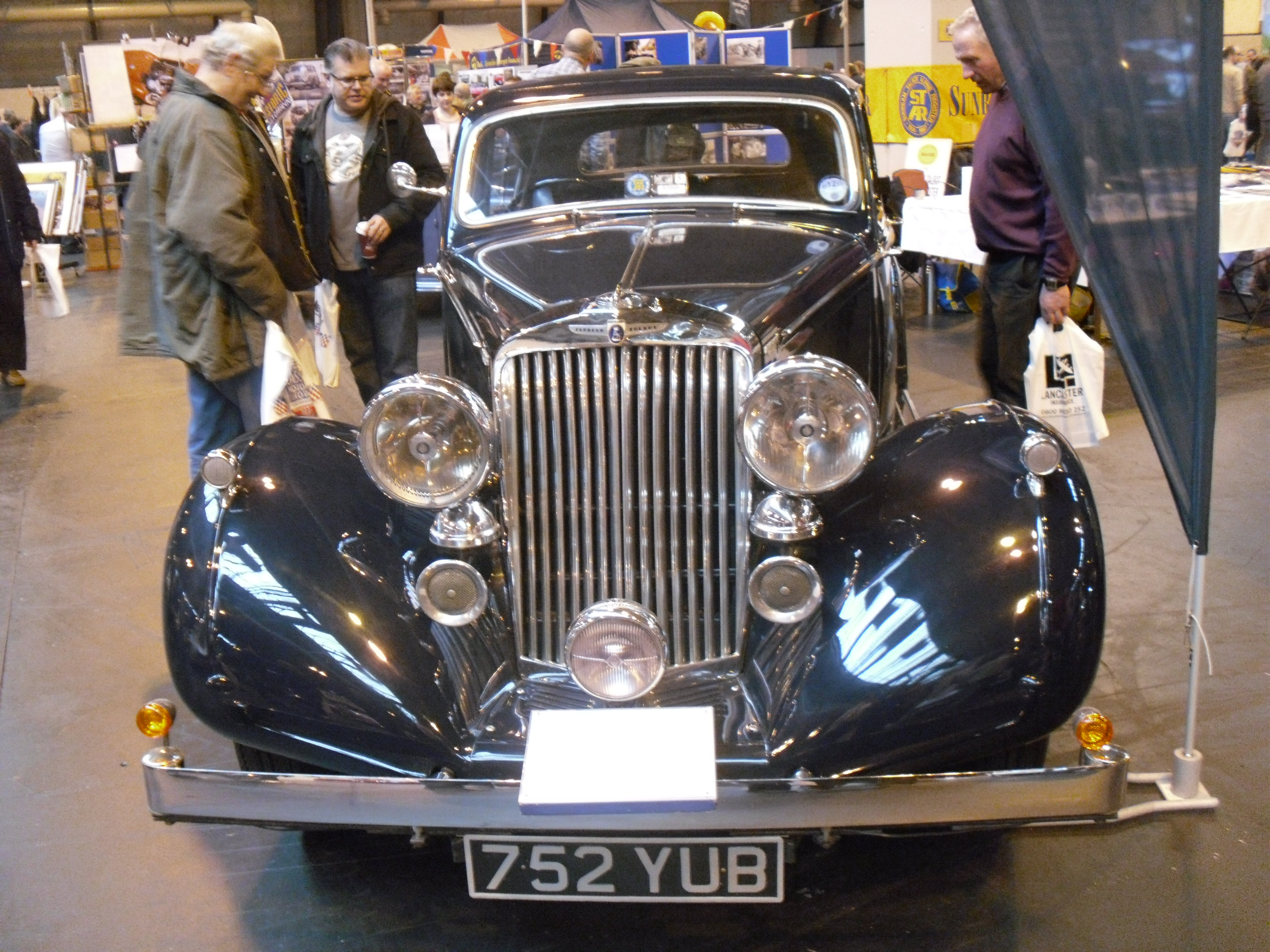
4-litre 6-light 4-door sports saloon 1939 rebadged Humber Super Snipe

=== Second World War ===
During the war, the Barlby Road factory repaired aero engines and built Karrier Bantam lorries. All Sunbeam-Talbot production was suspended though Rootes continued to build the Hillman Minx and Humber Super Snipe for military use. When production resumed in 1945 only the 10 and 2-litre were continued. The 3 and 4 litre models were never revived. The following year production moved in Spring 1946 from the ex-Talbot Barlby Road London plant to the new Ryton plant opened in 1940 for the production of bombers and military vehicles under the UK government's shadow factory scheme.

=== Postwar ===
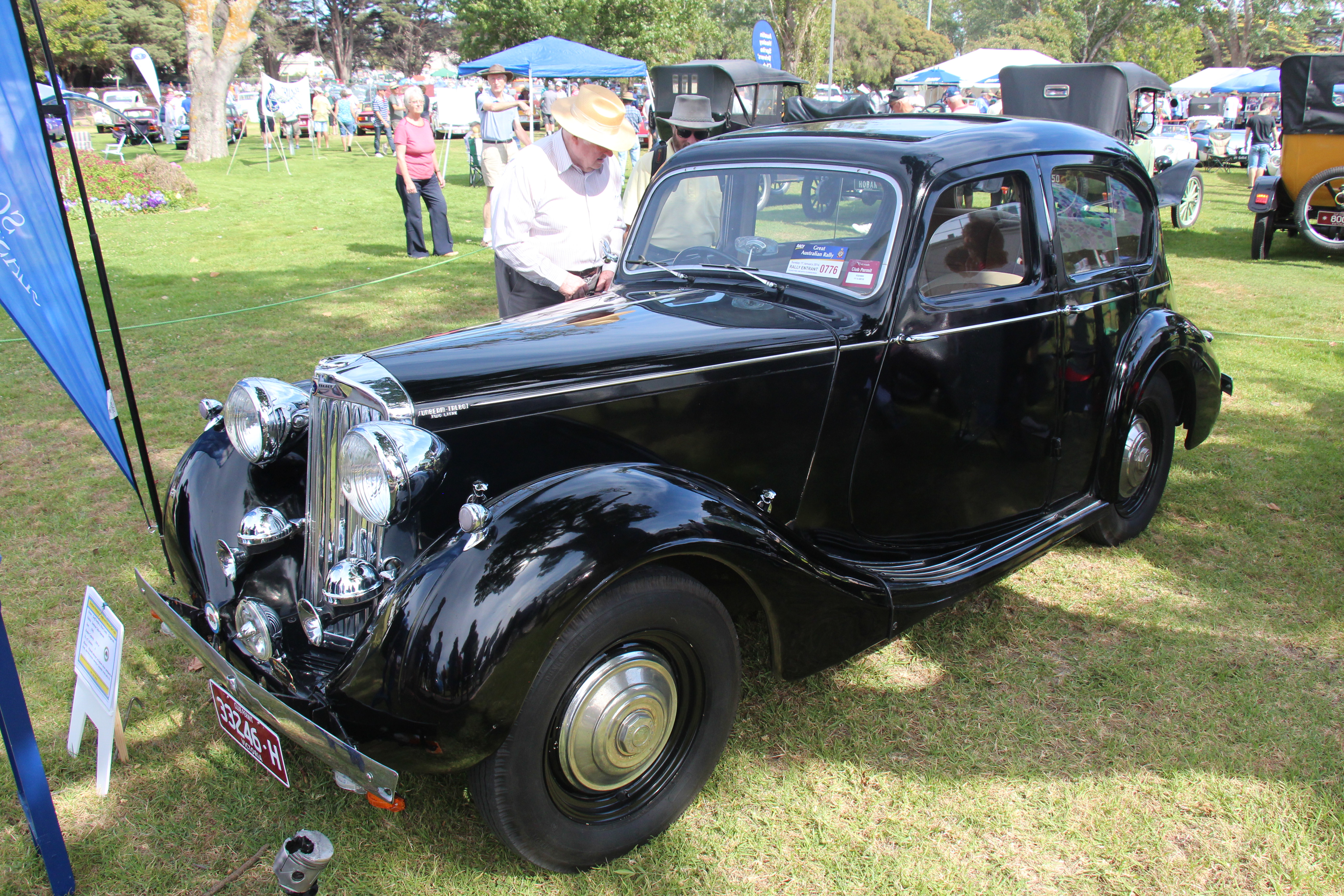
2-litre 1947 with Hillman 14 engine

Rootes were relatively quick to reintroduce the 1,944 cc and 1,185 cc Sunbeam-Talbots after the war, though the cars delivered during the first couple of years followed the designs first seen in 1939, readily identifiable by their separate headlamps. The ex-Talbot London plant became a Rootes service centre. (In 1987 the outside of the old London administration block in Barlby Road, W10, was transformed into the set for the Thames Television programme, The Bill, which was filmed there between 1987 and 1990.)

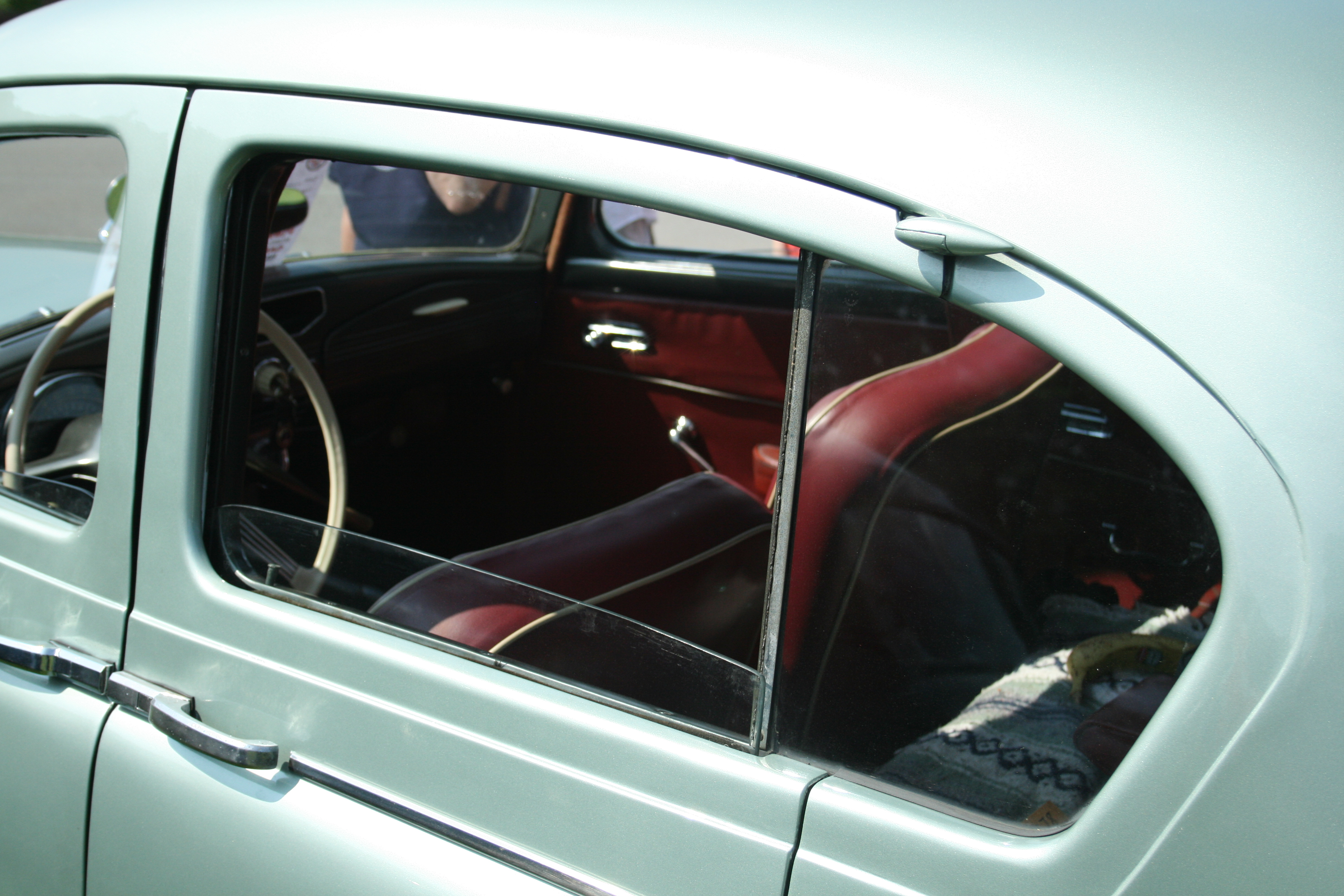
Sunbeam-Talbot's distinctive reverse-slope rear side-window

New Sunbeam-Talbot 80 and 90 designs were introduced during the summer of 1948 and built at the new Ryton plant. Both had the same new streamlined design with flowing front wings into which were integrated headlamps in a manner reminiscent of the front of a fighter plane, a shape that would have been all too familiar to potential buyers at the time. The designer, Ted White, acknowledged a prewar Packard had been his inspiration. The 80 was again fitted with an overhead valve version of the old 10 and Minx engine. The 90 had a modified version of the Humber Hawk ohv 4-cylinder 2-litre engine. Both were available with saloon bodywork from British Light Steel Pressings or drophead coupe bodywork by Thrupp & Maberly. The small-engined postwar austerity model Sunbeam-Talbot 80 was discontinued in 1950.

The 90 continued in production renamed 90 MK II with a new chassis and independent front suspension. The headlamps were raised by three inches to meet American regulations and the front driving lamps were replaced with a pair of small air intake grilles. The 90 MK II also had an enlarged OHV engine with 2267 cc. The MK IIA arrived in 1952, the main update on this model was the removal of the rear wheel spats.

Sunbeam-Talbot models sold

- 1938–1948 Sunbeam Talbot Ten
- 1938–1940 Sunbeam-Talbot Three Litre
- 1939–1948 Sunbeam-Talbot 2 Litre
- 1939–1940 Sunbeam-Talbot Four Litre
- 1948–1950 Sunbeam-Talbot 80
- 1948–1954 Sunbeam-Talbot 90 Mk I, II & IIA

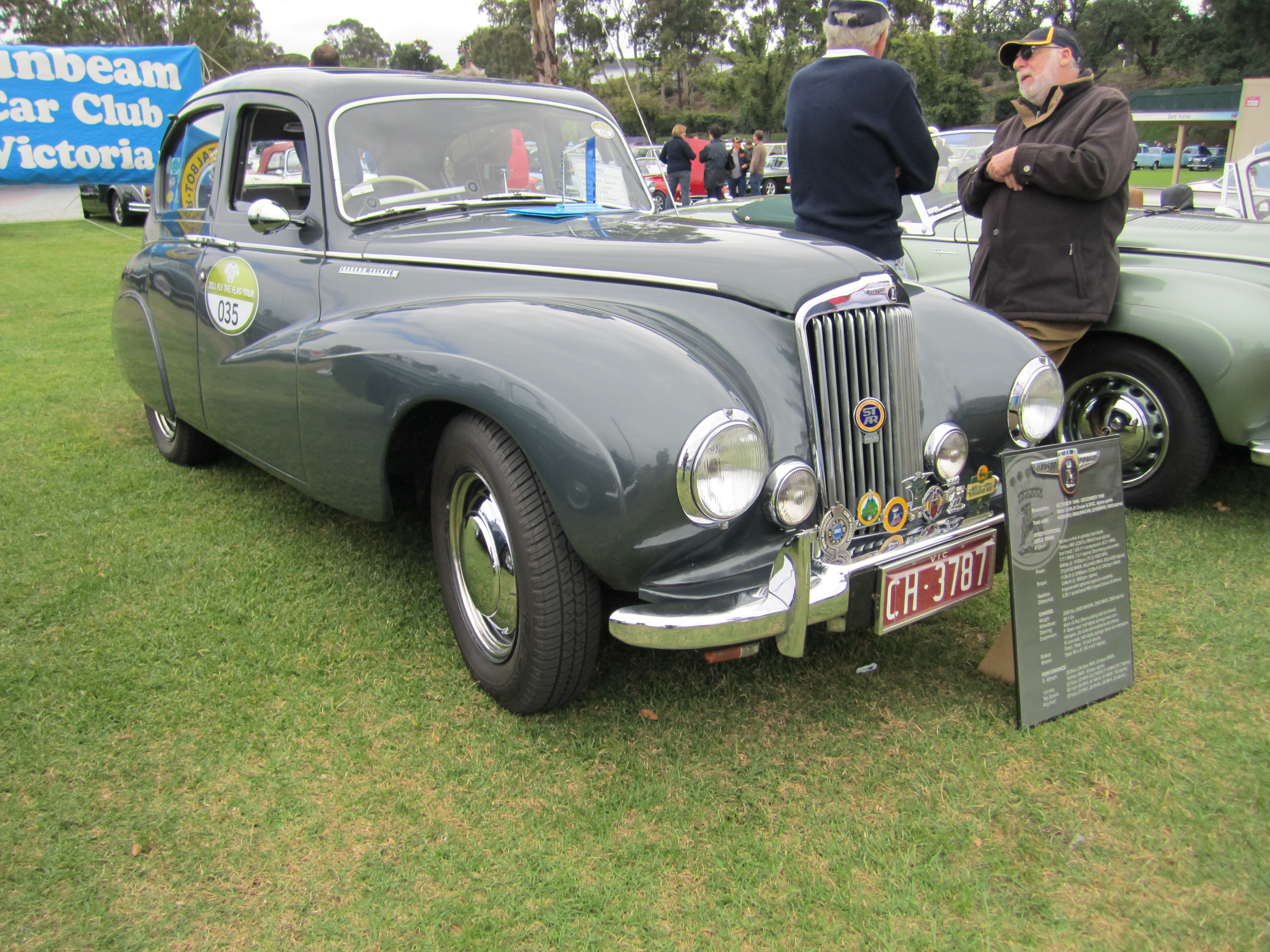
80 Mark I saloon c. 1950

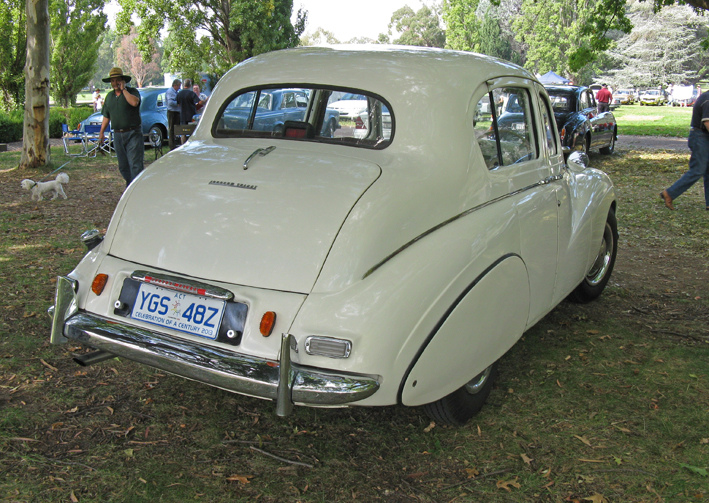
80 Mk I saloon showing spats

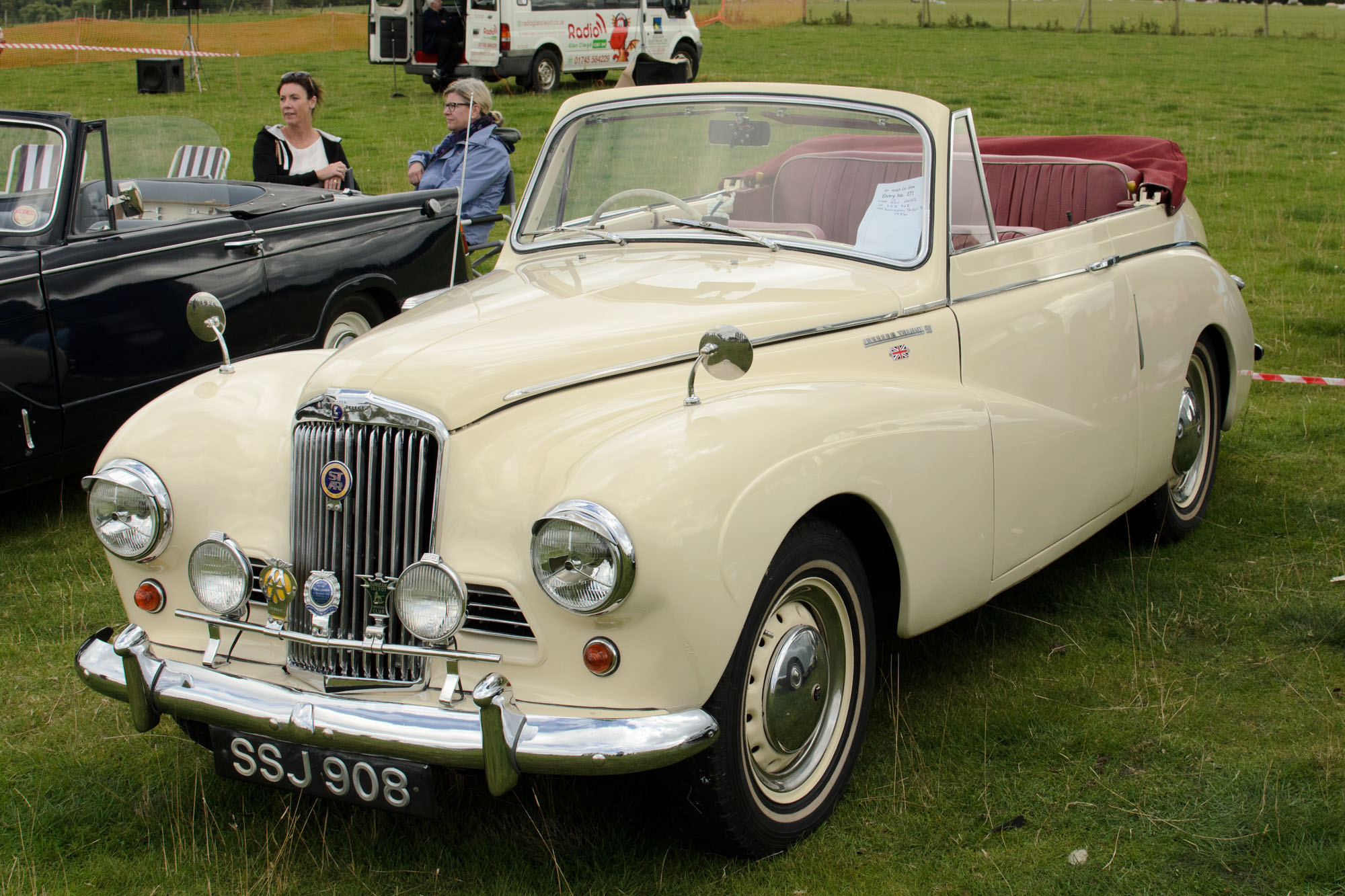
90 Mk IIA drophead coupé 1954

== Sunbeam ==
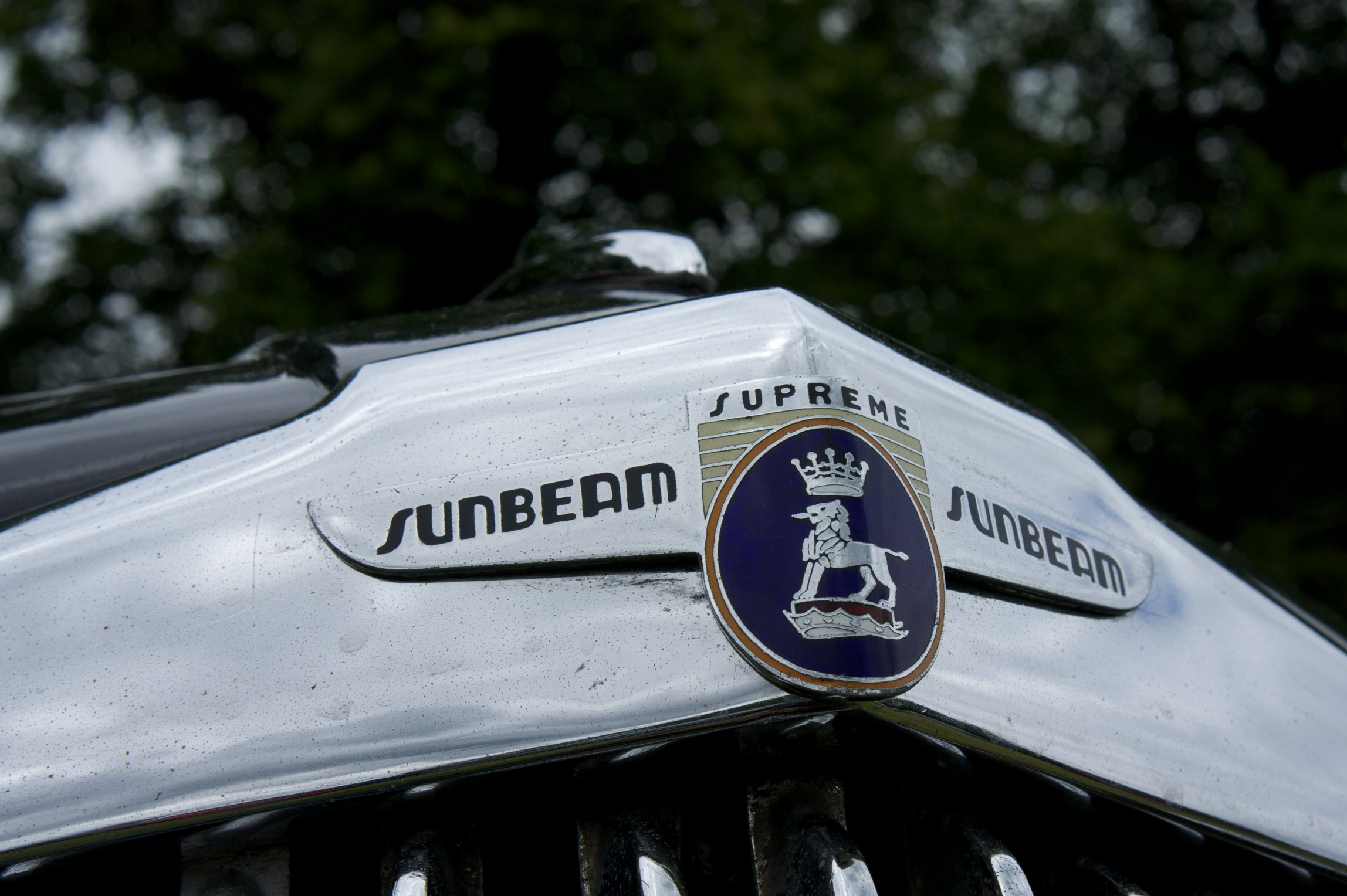

=== Sunbeam-Talbot facelift ===
After twenty years of potential confusion with the French Talbot that name was dropped in 1954 and the final revision was badged Sunbeam instead. It was given much larger front air intake grilles and three air outlet portholes just below each side at the back of the bonnet. The engine now developed 80 bhp (60 kW; 81 PS), amazing compared to the 64 bhp (48 kW; 65 PS) that the, admittedly smaller swept volume, very first 90 achieved. In the 1952 Alpine Rally cars won three Coupes des Alpes, Manufacturers Team Prize, 1st 2nd and third places in the 2 to 3-litre class and a special cup for an outstanding performance. A name had been found for a new model.

Production of the first postwar style finally ended in 1957.

=== Alpine 2.25 Litre open two-seater by Mulliners of Birmingham ===
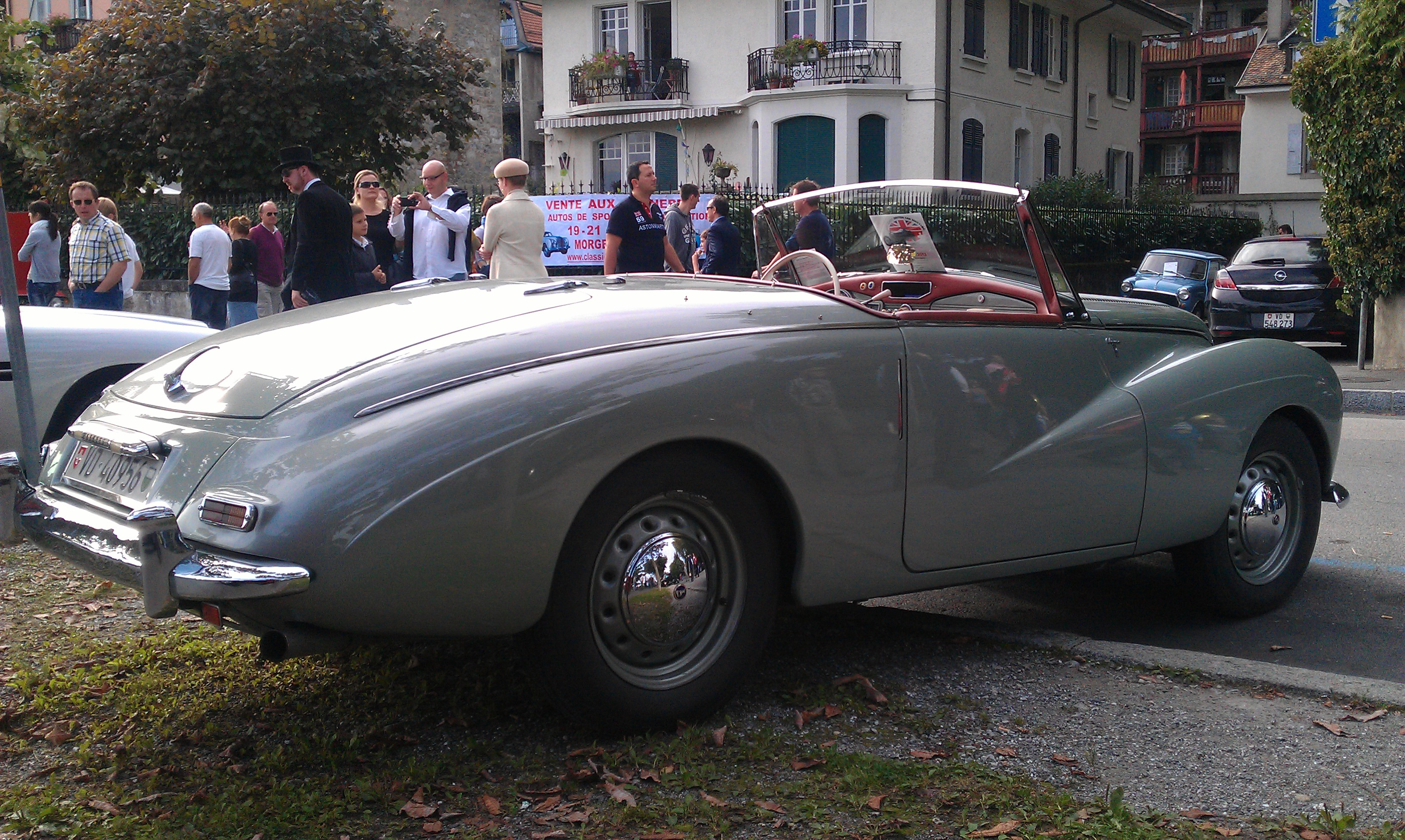
1954 Alpine in Morges canton of Vaud, Switzerland. This car displays a Vaud registration

The first Alpine is a two-seater sports-variant its body specially made by Mulliners of Birmingham from the standard 2¼-litre 4-seater drophead coupé. Very successful in motor rallying in Europe —rallying was then a greater spectator sport than GP racing— its production was from 1953 to 1955. The day before its announcement it was awarded the RAC Dewar Trophy for setting new speed and endurance records on the Jabbeke autoroute and the Montlhéry circuit.

On its first competitive outing, the 1953 Coupe des Alpes, the new car won the Coupe des Dames (Sheila Van Damm) and, without loss of any marks, four Coupes des Alpes driven by Stirling Moss, John Fitch, G Murray-Frame and Sheila Van Damm.

Under Rootes Sunbeams and Talbots with the unified name continued competition in some motorsports. The two seater Alpine variants proved to be very effective rally vehicles with notable International successes by drivers Sheila van Damm and Stirling Moss. Cars competed in and won numerous international rallies, most notably the 1955 Monte Carlo Rally. They concentrated mainly on the more popular rallying rather than other competition.

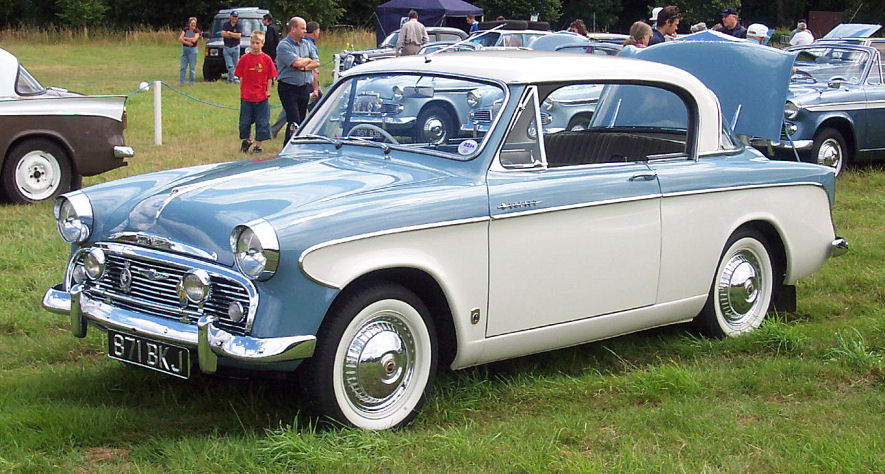
Sunbeam Rapier and the Sunbeam-Talbot reverse angle side-window

=== Sunbeam Rapier 1.5 Litre ===
Sunbeam Rapier is a Raymond Loewy designed two-door hardtop variant of the Hillman Minx available from October 1955. Later sold as a convertible it displayed the Sunbeam-Talbot signature rear side-window on its first hardtop version.

In 1967 it was replaced by a two-door fastback version of the Hillman Hunter which stayed in production until 1976.

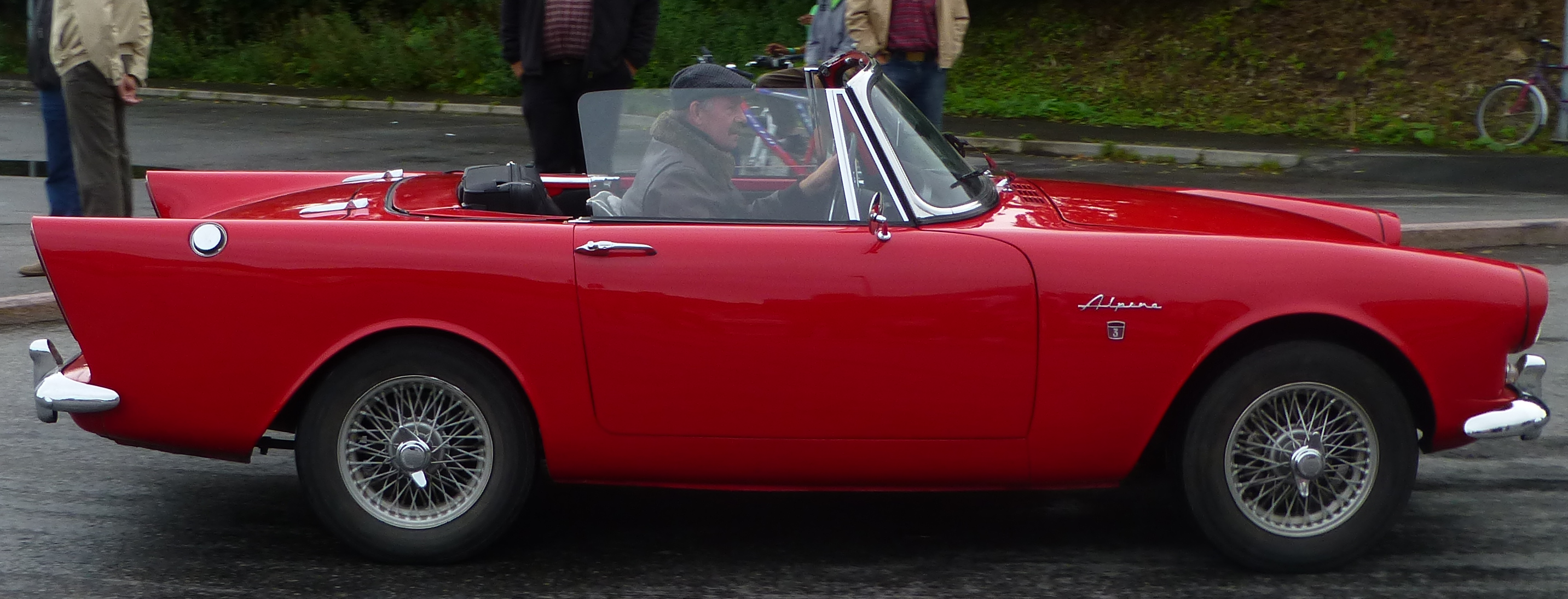
Sunbeam Alpine 1.5 Litre

=== Sunbeam Alpine 1.5 Litre ===
Series I. From 1959 to 1968 a quite different 1½-litre car with the same name and an up-to-date prominently finned Transatlantic shape for its body was made on a modified Hillman Husky chassis. A 4¼ Litre (later 4¾ Litre) Ford V8 powered variant was sold under the name Tiger. The Tiger showed little change in external appearance.

==== Hunter variant ====
Low spec Rapier. Under Chrysler ownership and continuing the old Sunbeam-Talbot Ten and Sunbeam Rapier formula a two-door fastback variant of the Hillman Hunter Minx replacement was sold under the Alpine name from 1969 to 1975. Unusually this Sunbeam was a simplified downmarket version of the main Sunbeam Rapier car.

=== Sunbeam Tiger 4.75 Litre ===
The Q-car, Sunbeam Tiger, is a Sunbeam Alpine with a 4¼-litre, later 4¾-litre, Ford V8 engine transplant.
