= British Light Steel Pressings =

British Light Steel Pressings Ltd was a company at Warple Way, Acton, London producing bodies for the vehicle industry.

British Light Steel Pressings Ltd (BLSP) was formed in 1930. In its early years it made pressings for various purposes. In 1937 it was taken over by the Rootes Group, to make body shells for Sunbeam cars. After World War II, despite transfer of production of Sunbeam-Talbots from the old London Talbot factory to a new government funded site at Ryton, BLSP continued in production. In 1948, for example, versions of the Sunbeam-Talbot 80 and 90 were available with saloon bodywork from BLSP or drophead coupé bodywork by another nearby Rootes company, Thrupp & Maberly. During the mid-1950s car bodies produced included the Sunbeam Mk III saloon and convertible, Sunbeam Alpine (1953–55) and thereafter the Humber Hawk, Super Snipe and Imperial in saloon and estate car versions. BLSP Ltd ran a successful apprenticeship scheme covering both professional engineering and trade programmes.

By the 1960s BLSP had some of the largest presses in Britain and, as well as body shells, produced a wide range of car and commercial components for the Rootes Group including suspension units, petrol tanks and small pressings. The Rootes group by this time included Humber, Hillman, Sunbeam-Talbot, Singer, Commer and Karrier.

However, from the late 1950s the company suffered from industrial unrest, which has been cited as the root of problems leading eventually to the takeover of Rootes by Chrysler. The first strike of 1,500 workers began when a couple of newly-wed night shift workers asked to be transferred to day shift, and became known as the 'Honeymoon Strike'. A spate of 82 mainly unofficial strikes in 1961 caused the loss of over 27,000 man hours at the BLSP plant, which in turn caused the loss of 17,000 man hours at other Rootes plants. Finally a strike led to an ultimatum to all 1000 workers to return to work or be sacked. A recruitment drive was started to replace striking workers but as the strike rolled on 8,000 workers from other factories were made redundant.

Rootes announced its plan to close the plant in July 1966. At that time it was producing commercial vehicle cabs and van body pressings.
