= Marauder Cars =

Marauder A and 100
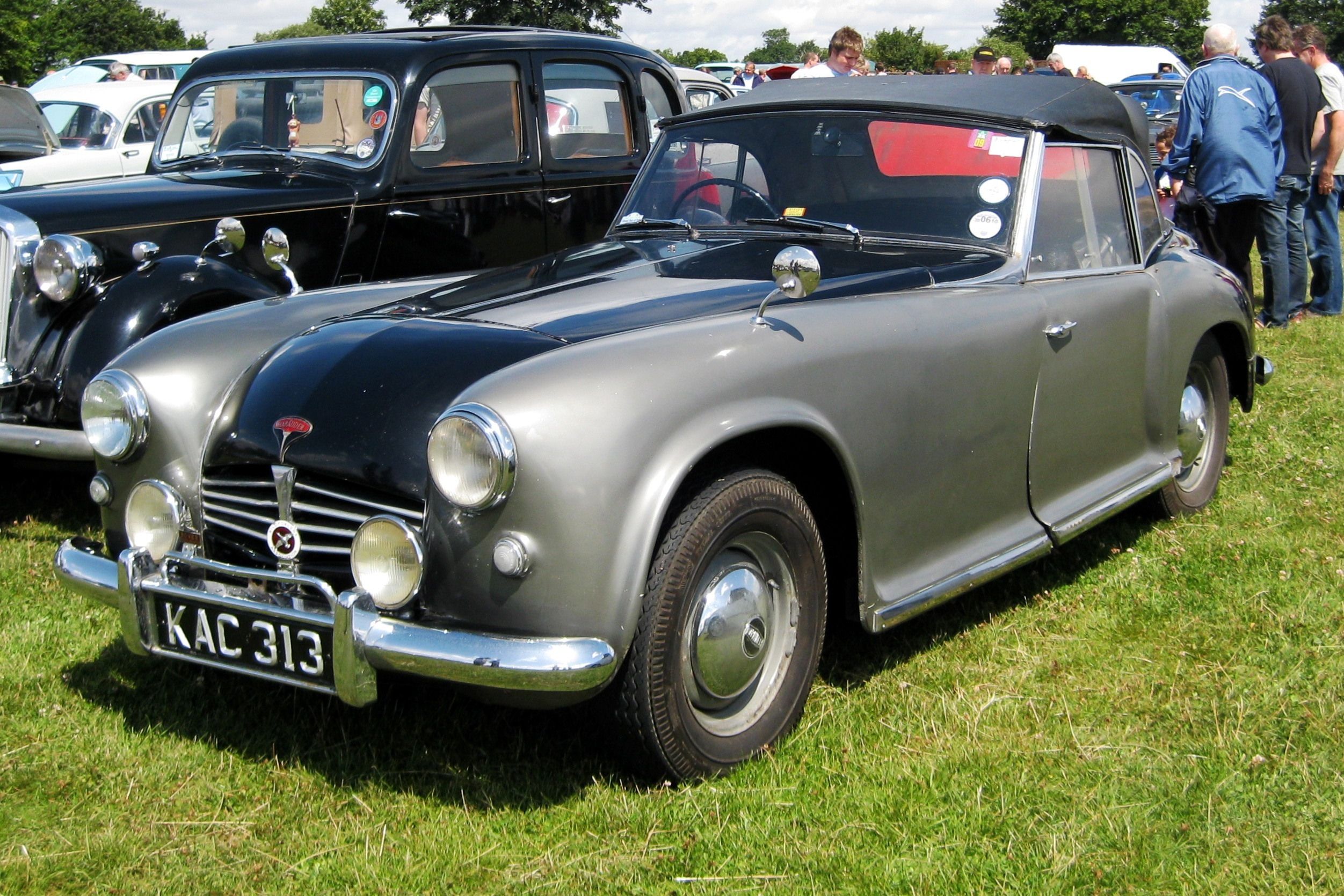
- Marauder A three-seater registered June 1950; KAC 313 the first car built

Overview
- Manufacturer: Marauder Car Company Limited; #00481727; previously Wilks, Mackie and Company Limited
- Production: 1950–1952; 15 made
- Designer: George Mackie, Spencer King, Peter Wilks

Body and chassis
- Body style: Open (Note: Open because weather protection was limited to a lightweight folding roof and detachable side-screens. There were no wind-up windows. The alloy-framed clear perspex side-screens contained sliding sections to permit the obligatory hand signals) two-seater / three-seater; (one) 2-door coupé

Powertrain
- Engine: Rover 2103 cc straight 6 (A model); 2392 cc (100 model)
- Transmission: 4-speed manual with optional overdrive

Dimensions
- Wheelbase: 102 in (2,600 mm)
- Length: 13'10" (166")(4216mm)
- Curb weight: 1ton 3cwt (2,576lbs)(1,186kg)

Marauder Car Company Limited was a British car venture by ex-Rover engineers George Mackie and Peter Wilks. After successfully racing their single-seater Marauder racing car the pair left Rover in 1950 and formed Wilks, Mackie and Company to exploit their idea of a two-seater sports car based on the new Rover 75 chassis. In 1951 they changed the company's name to Marauder Car Company.

Around 15 cars were made before a sharp luxury tax imposed on cars priced over £1,000 brought sales to an end and George Mackie and Peter Wilks rejoined Rover.

== Design ==
The design was largely the work of Peter Wilks and "Spen" King who, like Wilks, was a nephew of brothers Spencer and Maurice Wilks who ran Rover. Spencer King was later famous for his involvement in many Rover and Leyland Group designs. Though usually considered a sports car their new car was marketed as a Marauder Tourer.

The car named the "A", later joined by the more powerful "100", was based on the Rover P4 75 with the chassis shortened by 9 inches (230 mm) from 111 inches (2,800 mm) to 102 inches (2,600 mm), the track remaining the same at 52 inches (1,300 mm). The suspension was stiffened retaining the coil sprung independent front suspension and elliptical sprung live rear axle. In view of the much lighter 2/3-seater (a single bench seat but the seats were separated on the "100") open coachwork the engine was moved back to improve handling and front / rear weight distribution. The Rover gearbox was retained with optional Laycock–de Normanville overdrive but not the Rover free wheel mechanism. The gearchange moved from column to floor.

The 6-cylinder, inlet over exhaust valve, 2103 cc Rover engine was slightly modified with higher compression ratio to raise the output by 5 bhp (4 kW; 5 PS) to 80 bhp (60 kW; 81 PS) whilst the 100 version was bored out to 2392 cc and fitted with triple SU carburettors to give 105 bhp (78 kW; 106 PS). The "A" was capable of 90 mph (145 km/h) and the "100" 100 mph (161 km/h)

== Manufacture ==
Manufacturing started in Dorridge, near Solihull, in Warwickshire and later continued in Kenilworth, between 1950 and 1952. In 1951 Wilks, Mackie and Company's name was changed to Marauder Car Company. (Note: and dissolved 18 July 1967. page 7899 The London Gazette 18 July 1967)

The first few bodies were made by Richard Mead in his Dorridge works and used some Rover panels but later ones were made by Abbey Panels of Coventry.

About 15 cars were made including 2 of the "100"s before rising costs and tax changes priced the cars out of the market. The UK government doubled the already high level of Purchase Tax on cars with a pre-tax price above £1000. In 1950 the car cost £1236 rising to over £2000 in 1952.

Both George Mackie and Peter Wilks rejoined Rover.

== Gallery ==
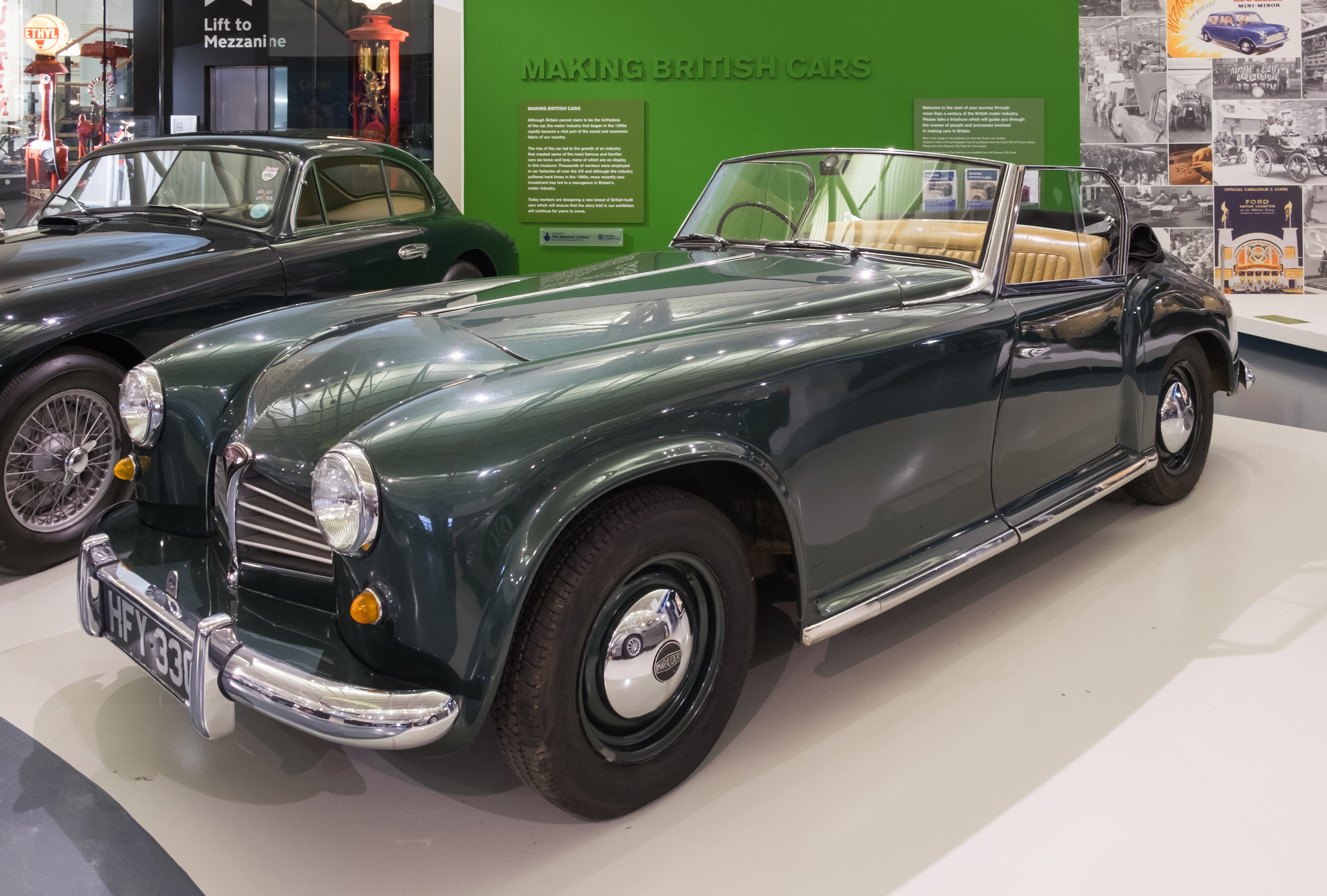
Marauder 100 open two-seater
registered November 1951, has a 3-litre engine

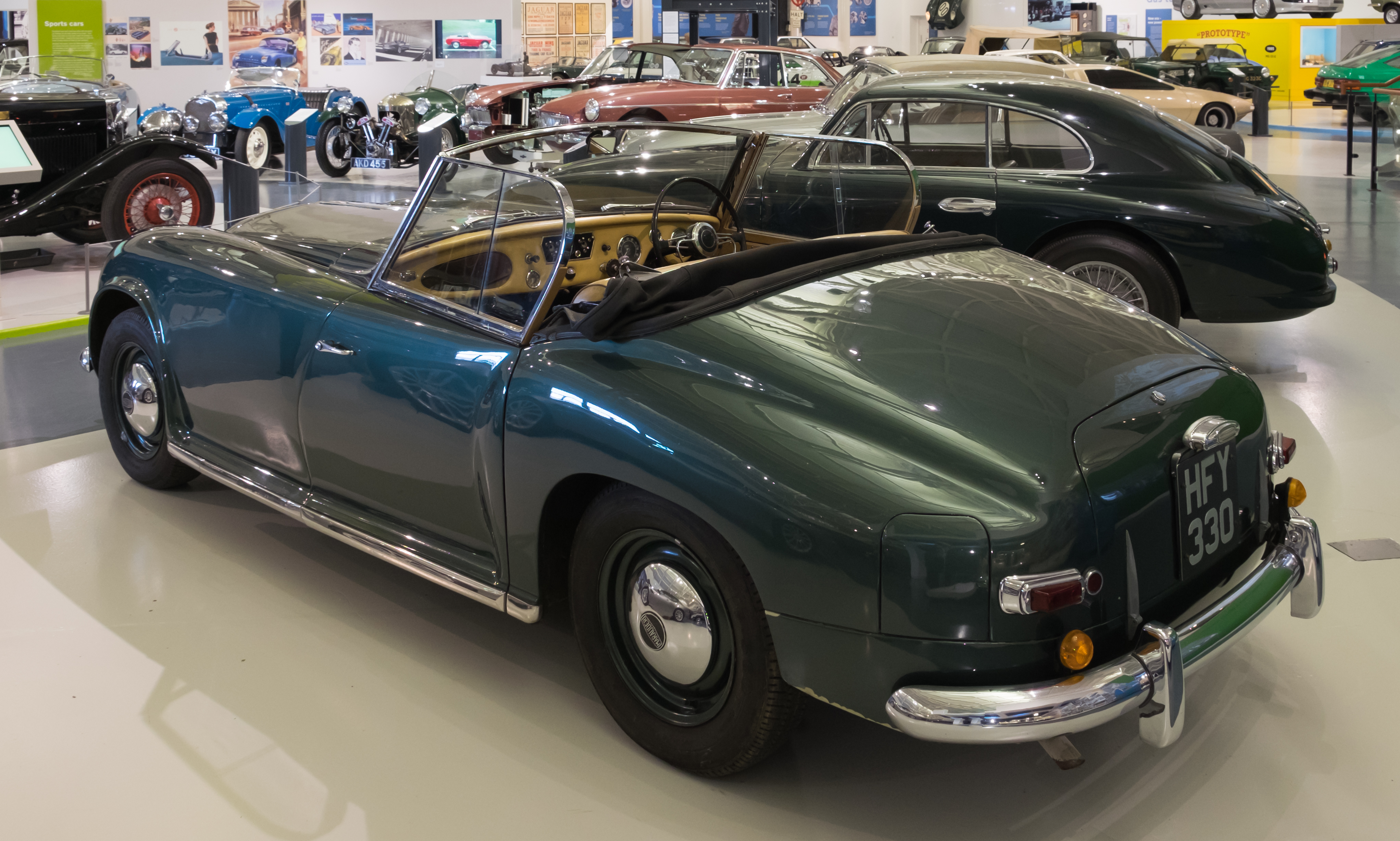
Marauder 100 open two-seater rear

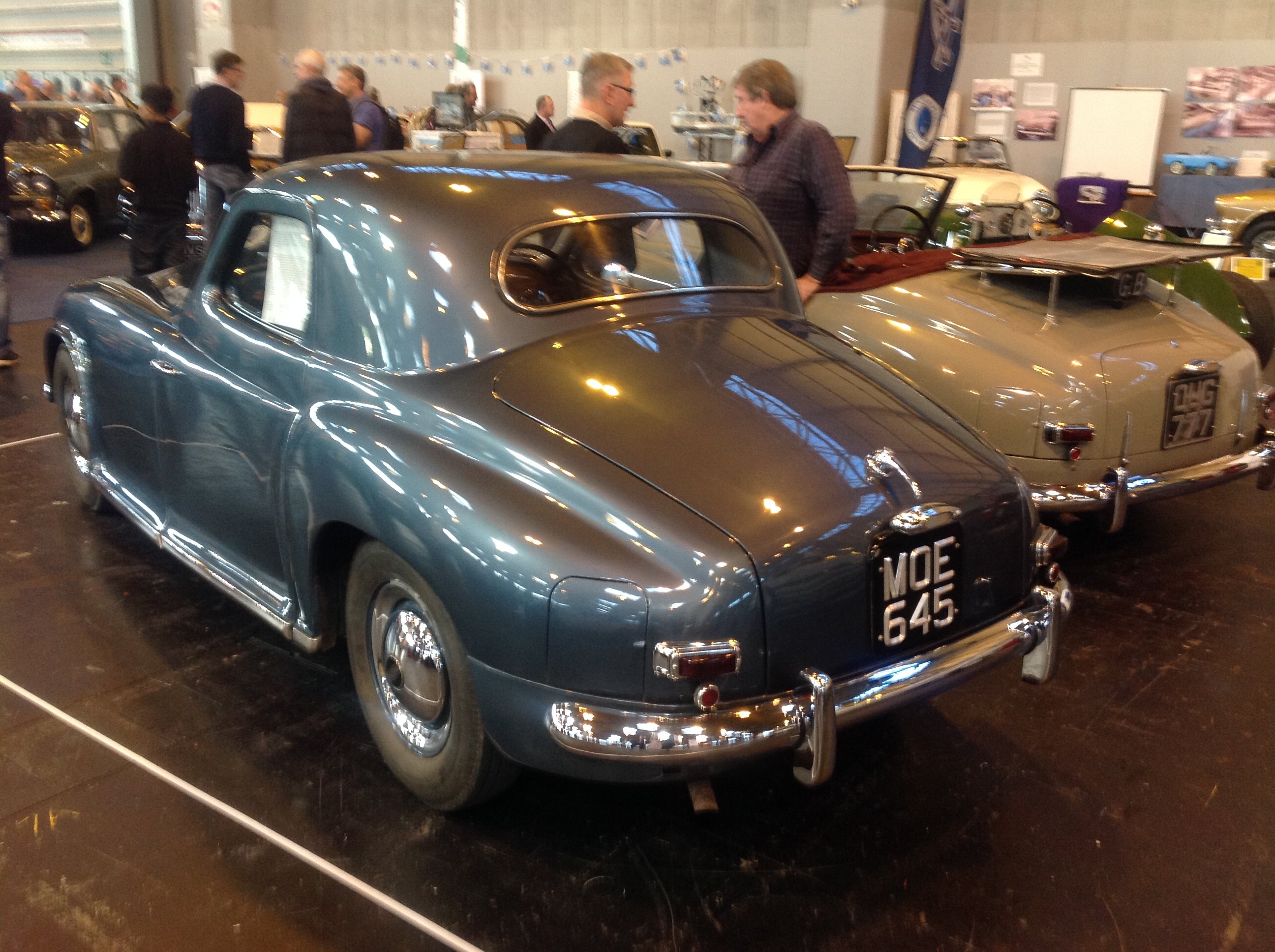
The sole coupé registered April 1952 the fifth car and built to a special order

== See also ==
- List of car manufacturers of the United Kingdom
