= Arthur Goddard =

Arthur Goddard may refer to:

- Arthur Goddard (footballer) (1876–1956), footballer who played for Liverpool
- Arthur Goddard (engineer) (1921–2022), British engineer who developed the Land Rover
