= Charles Spencer King =

British automobile designer

Charles Spencer "Spen" King CBE (26 March 1925 – 26 June 2010) was a significant design engineer in the Rover Company (and, after their takeover, in the British Leyland Motor Corporation). He is particularly associated with the Rover P6, the Rover SD1 and the Range Rover.

== Career ==
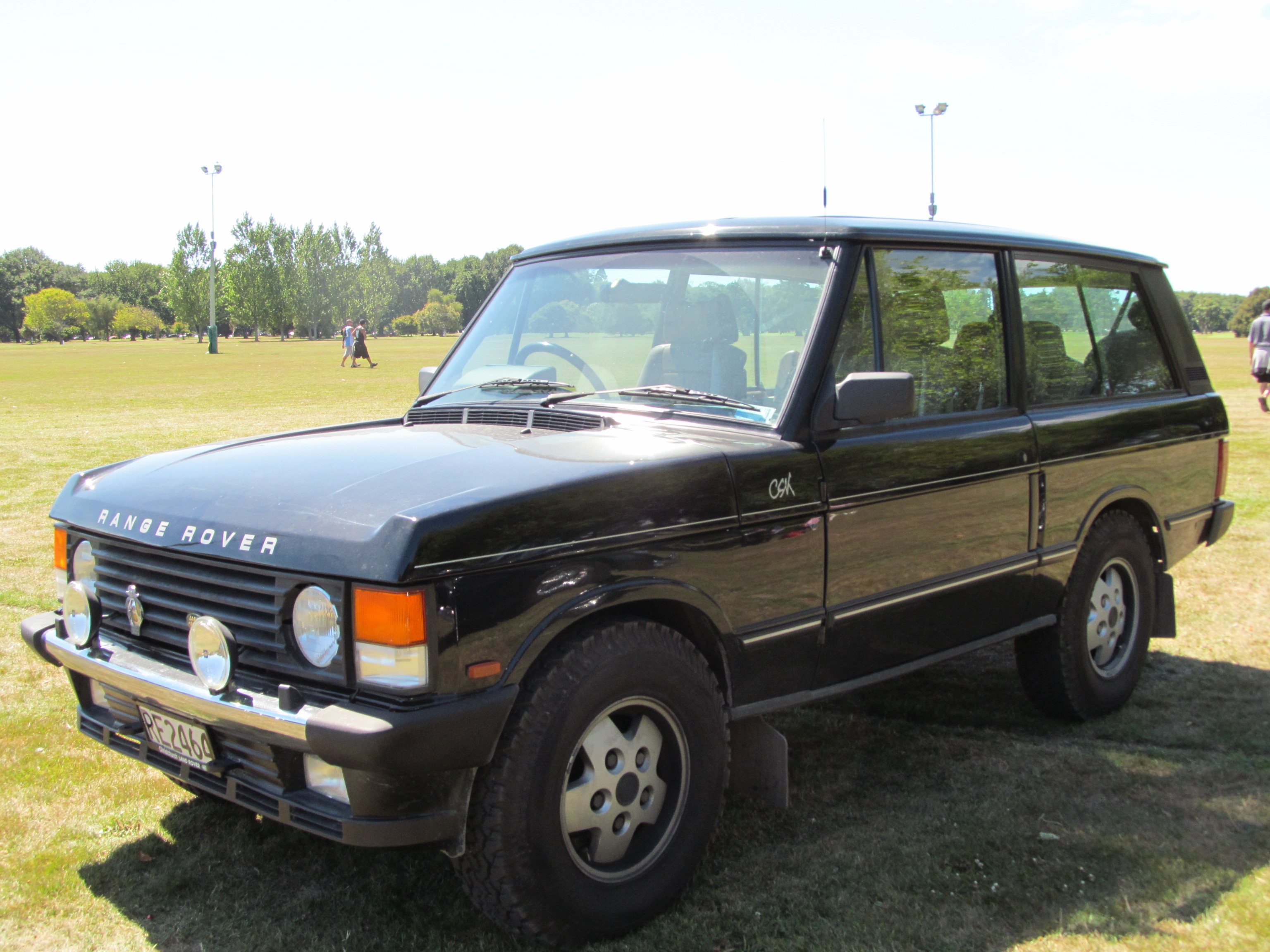
CSK special edition Range Rover 1991

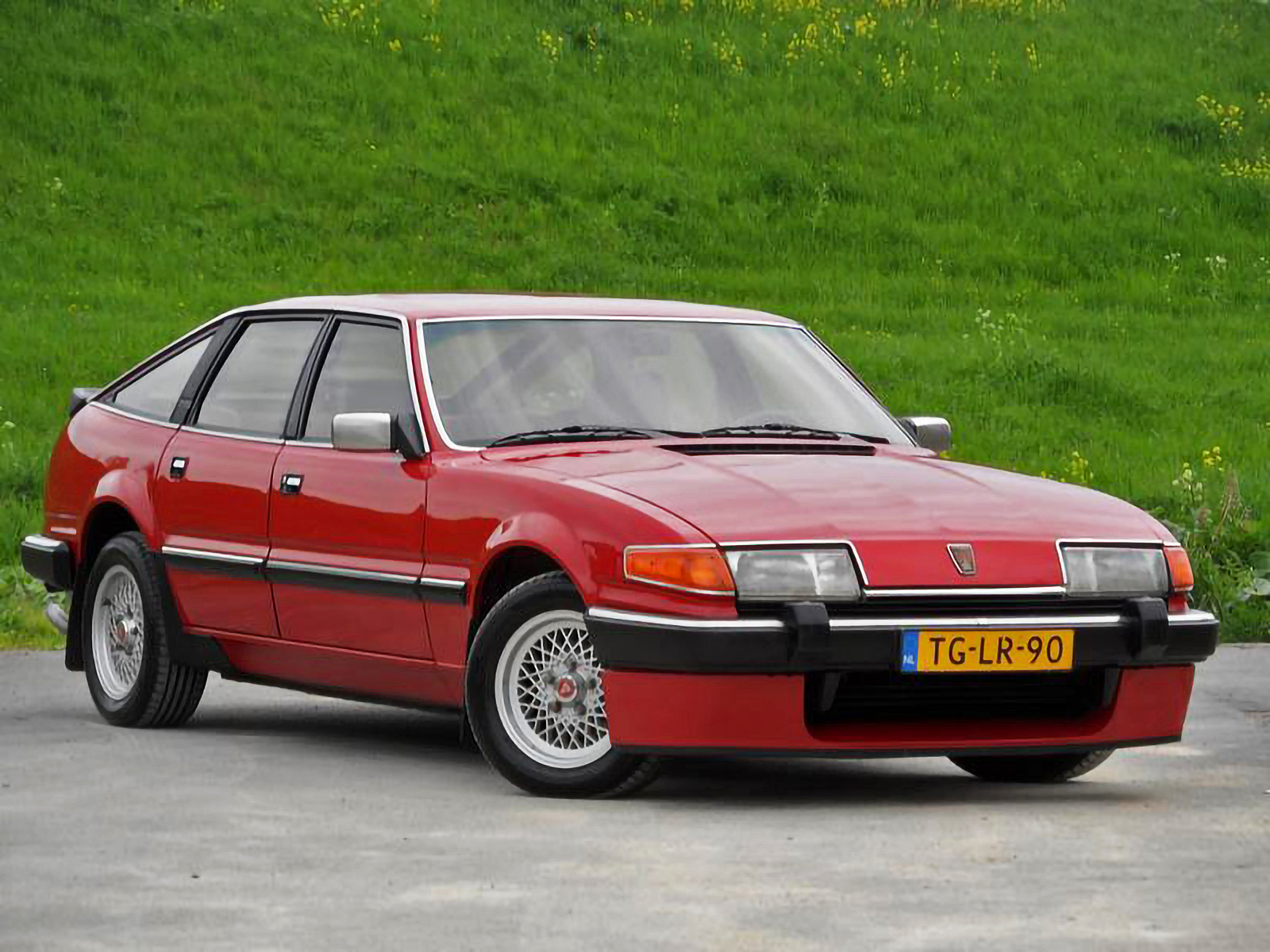
Rover 3500 Vitesse (SD1)

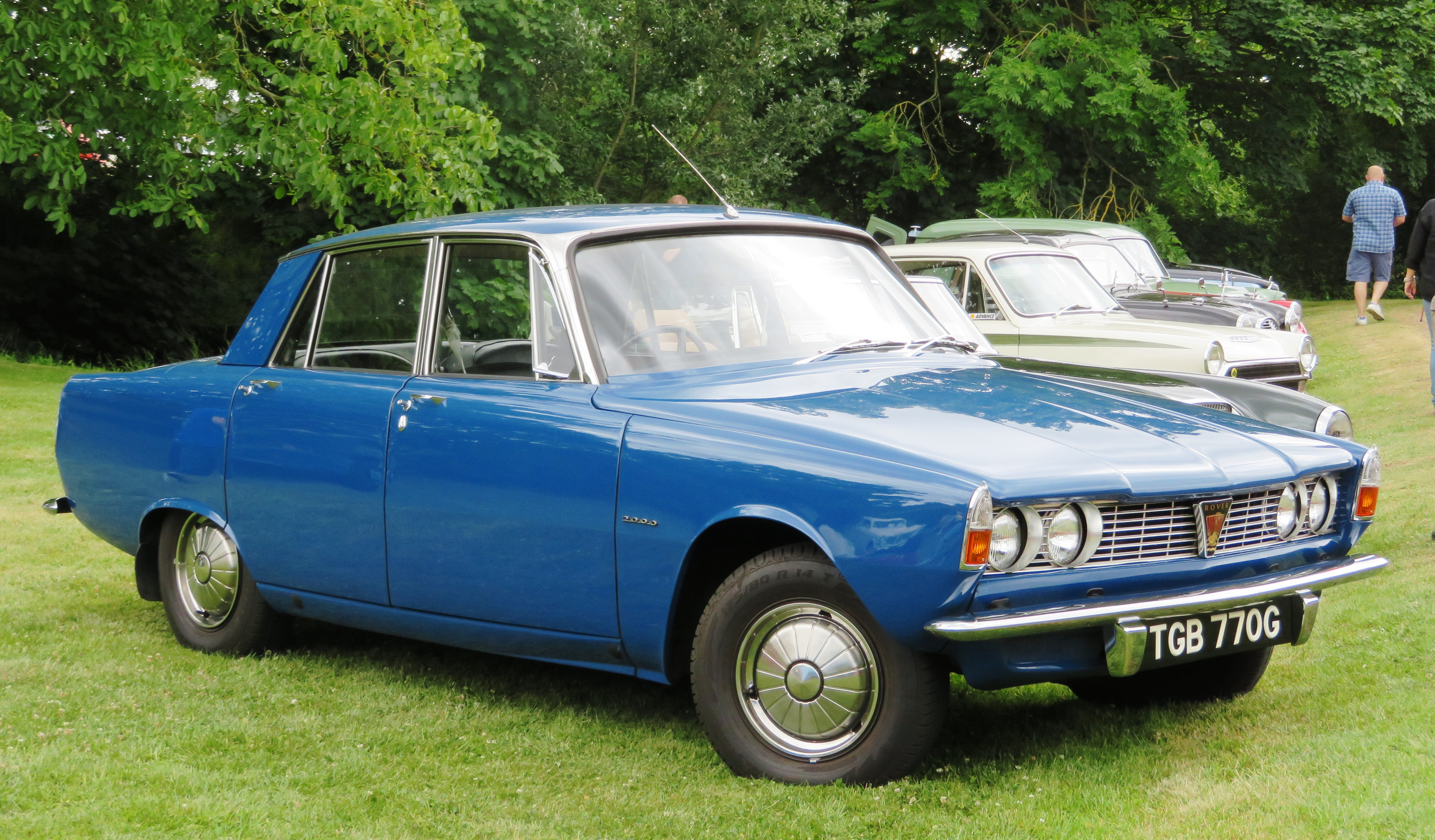
Rover 2000 (P6)

After leaving school in 1942, King was first apprenticed to Rolls-Royce. He joined Rover, run by his uncles Maurice and Spencer Wilks, in 1945 and worked initially on the gas-turbine powered JET1 and T3 experimental prototypes. In 1959, he became chief engineer of new vehicle projects. King is best known for his leadership of the teams that developed the advanced Rover P6 series, introduced as the 2000 in 1963, and the hugely successful Range Rover (of which a "CSK" special edition later celebrated his involvement) launched in June 1970. King was also responsible for the Rover-based Marauder sports car in 1950 and many Rover experimental and prototype vehicles. As Rover was taken over by the Leyland Motor Corporation which subsequently became British Leyland (BL), he also led teams responsible for the Triumph TR6, Triumph Stag and Triumph TR7 models as well as the innovative design of the 16-valve cylinder head used on the Triumph Dolomite Sprint. David Bache & King designed the Rover SD1 fastback saloon. Several other BL Group models were developed under his leadership. King's tenure coincided with a chaotic time for the British motor industry. King was frequently frustrated by the design compromises imposed by insufficient funding, and the poor quality of vehicles produced by an uncooperative workforce in the mainly outdated plants owned by the company.

While chairman of BL Technology from 1979 he was responsible for developing a series of light, aerodynamic and technically advanced ECV (Energy Conservation Vehicle) experimental models (including the ECV3), features of which were incorporated into later BL Group products such as the Rover K-series engine, or adopted by other manufacturers. Spen King retired from the company in 1985.

In 1992, King was appointed as a director of Coventry-based Land Rover specialist JE Engineering Ltd, where he continued until 2005.

In 2004, he criticised SUV owners who drive their vehicles in urban areas, saying that vehicles like the Range Rover he created were "never intended as a status symbol but later incarnations of my design seem to be intended for that purpose".

King and his former Rover colleague Arthur Goddard extensively shared many of their views on the motor industry in 2010. The transcript of their discussion was published in the book They Found Our Engineer in 2011.

It was announced on 28 June 2010 that King had died on 26 June after suffering complications following a cycling accident.
