= Hillman 20 8-cylinder =

Hillman Straight-Eight

Overview
- Manufacturer: Hillman Motor Car Co Ltd
- Model years: 1929, 1930

Body and chassis
- Class: Executive car
- Body style: open tourer; saloon; Weymann fabric saloon; Segrave fabric coupé; Segrave fabric sports saloon
- Layout: FR

Powertrain
- Engine: 2,620 cc (159.9 cu in); straight-8
- Transmission: single plate dry clutch, 4-speed gearbox, Hardy Spicer propeller shaft with metal universal joints is mated with a half-floating spiral bevel driven back axle

Dimensions
- Wheelbase: 120.5 in (3,061 mm); track 56 in (1,422 mm)
- Length: 175 in (4,445 mm)
- Width: 68.25 in (1,734 mm)
- Kerb weight: fabric saloon 24 cwt, 2,688 lb (1,219 kg); Vortic all-steel saloon 32½ cwt, 3,640 lb (1,650 kg)

Chronology
- Predecessor: none
- Successor: Hillman Vortic 8

Hillman Vortic 8

Overview
- Manufacturer: Hillman Motor Car Co Ltd
- Production: 1931

Layout
- Configuration: straight 8-cylinder
- Displacement: 2,620 cc (159.9 cu in)
- Cylinder bore: 63 mm (2.48 in)
- Piston stroke: 105 mm (4.13 in)
- Cylinder block material: cast iron, aluminium alloy die cast pistons, 5-bearing crankshaft with a vibration damper at the front
- Cylinder head material: cast iron
- Valvetrain: overhead valves with double springs operated by pushrods; timing by chain; inlet manifold square section with 4 branches; 5-branch exhaust manifold with a double outlet

Combustion
- Fuel system: carburettor fed from vacuum tank on dash, main reservoir 12 gallons at back of car
- Fuel type: petrol
- Oil system: forced. pump is outside sump and pressure may be adjusted
- Cooling system: water, impeller combined with fan, true honeycomb radiator (protected by a shell), thermostatically-controlled shutters

Output
- Power output: 58 bhp (43 kW; 59 PS) @2,0 rpm; Tax horsepower 19.69

Chronology
- Predecessor: Hillman Straight Eight
- Successor: Hillman Wizard 75

The Hillman Straight Eight and its successor the Hillman Vortic were moderate priced mid-sized 20 tax-horsepower executive cars made by Hillman from 1929 to 1930. The lowest priced eight-cylinder car on the market the car was scarcely in full production when sales were hit by the onset of the Great Depression.

This pair of cars has been described as "the complete lemon". The straight eight engine was subject to bearing failure. The name was changed to Vortic and some modifications made including a silent third gear but it was to try to sell off unwanted stock. They were still offered in 1932.

The straight eight was replaced in Hillman's catalogue in April 1931 by their six-cylinder Wizard 65 and 75.

== Hillman Straight Eight ==
Though announced in September 1928 in good time for that year's Olympia Motor Show no photographs appeared or display advertisements until mid-March 1929 and a detailed description of the car had to wait for May 1929. However it is true a two-door four-seated Segrave fabric coupé was shown on the Hillman stand at the 1928 Motor Show with a Straight Eight engine beside it but very little information was supplied to press or public about either object.

=== Engine ===
The 2.6 Litre long-stroke engine has eight cylinders in line, their bore and stroke 63 mm by 105 mm. The eight pistons are aluminium alloy and die cast. The overhead valves operate by pushrods, the valve gear and all other parts that need it receive forced lubrication. Timing is controlled by chain which also has a positive oil feed. The oil's pressure may be varied by hand and there is a float oil-level indicator on the right hand side. An impeller made as part of the fan assembly circulates cooling water to the honeycomb radiator which is protected by a shell and has thermostatically controlled shutters in the grille in front of it.

The crankshaft carries a vibration damper at its front end and both crankshaft and camshaft have five bearings. No further information about the bottom of the engine was supplied to readers.

Engine, single plate dry clutch and gearbox are assembled together as a unit and supported at four points.

Gearbox

The four-speed gearbox has its change control on the off-side next to the driver's right hand and works in a visible gate with a catch for reverse.

=== Chassis ===
The chassis is said to somewhat resemble the chassis of Hillman's 14 horsepower car.

Suspension

The Straight Eight is provided with wire wheels. The springs are half-elliptical, splayed front and back and underhung at the rear and controlled both front and back by friction shock absorbers.

Brakes

The brake and other pedals are independent of the frame. Beneath the floor boards there is a hand wheel for primary adjustment of the 4-wheel brakes which have enclosed brake drums. The hand brake operates separate shoes in the rear drums and may be adjusted from the top of the lever. The rear brakes are operated by a single cable which gives compensation and an even pressure to each rear wheel and the front brakes are operated by pull-rods. Unusually for this period and price range there is a brake servo motor in the bottom of the gearbox.

Steering

Steering is by Marles, the steering box is fixed to the engine and the steering column is adjustable for rake

=== Body ===
The body is fitted with unsplinterable glass and dipping headlamp reflectors. The car's spare wire wheel and folding luggage grid are carried at the back.

== Trial ==
The car tested by The Times was a standard 5-seater 4-door 6-light saloon. The reviewer reported the one-piece screen has an electric wiper and opens enough to give a good view in bad weather but the thoroughly comfortable body seems a little narrow in front. Though the rear doors give easy access it is best to slide back the front seats before entry. The car's side windows in the doors may be fully lowered. The maximum speed achieved on the trial was 63 miles per hour (101 km/h). The steering action is "delightful".

== Unreliable ==
The Straight Eight won itself a reputation for being unreliable and sluggish.

== Hillman Vortic 8 ==
The previous sluggish engine performance has been improved by a new "patented turbo combustion" cylinder head and special connecting rods. The troublesome crankshaft is now harmonically balanced. The gearbox has been fitted with a silent third gear or Traffic top.

Speed and handbrake levers are now central and a tail lamp is supplied at no extra charge. The front seat is a single seat but it has an 8-inch range of adjustment. The side windows have quick action winders, the driver's is a lever not winder. One windscreen wiper is provided and provision made for another. The top of the steering wheel has controls for the horn, dimming the headlamps, and the spark and the throttle. Wire wheels continue to be provided. The spare remains behind the petrol tank in front of the folding luggage grid.

When tested by The Times the newspaper reported the saloon with the modified engine will do nearly 70 miles per hour (110 km/h) in top gear. The engine "gets into its stride well". There can be a slight hesitation but not comparable to the sluggish old Straight Eight. The final drive on the test car emitted a hum but the gearbox was quiet. Brakes required only light pressure and there was enough assistance when backing the car.

Twelve months later The Times tried the Vortic a second time noting further minor modifications: the Marles steering box is now fixed to the car's frame instead of the engine block. The engine clutch and gearbox unit is now held at the front on rubber. The handbrake lever is now mounted on the gearbox casing and not the body. Hydraulic shock absorbers are now fitted at the back. Then The Times commented that their correspondent believed the one-piece screen should open a little wider to give an uninterrupted direct view in bad weather. The springing might be better with hydraulic shock absorbers all round. Driving is simple and not tiring and travel is comfortable on most occasions. Highest comfortable speed was 65 miles per hour (105 km/h) and added "It took a little working up".
