= Spencer Wilks =

English car design engineer (1891–1971)

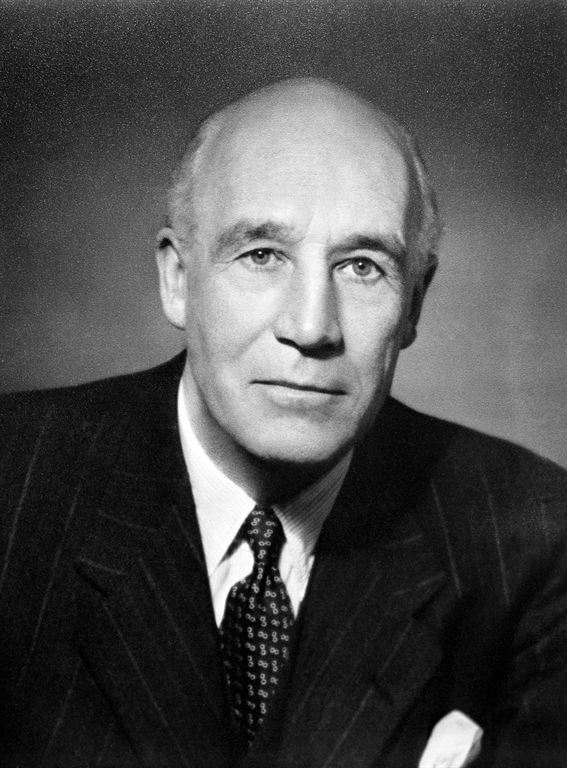
- Spencer Wilks
- Born: Spencer Bernau Wilks; 26 May 1891; Rickmansworth, England
- Died: 10 March 1971 (aged 79); Glenegedale, Scotland
- Known for: Car design engineer
- Relatives: Maurice Wilks (brother)

Spencer Bernau Wilks (26 May 1891 – 10 March 1971) was an English manager, administrator and designer in the motor manufacturing industry. He served variously in positions including managing director, chairman, and president of the Rover Company from 1929 until the 1960s. Previously he worked for the Hillman Motor Car Company in Coventry. His younger brother Maurice Wilks also worked at Rover as chief engineer, technical director and managing director from 1930. He is one of Land Rover's founders along with his younger brother Maurice.

== Early life and education ==
Wilks was born in Rickmansworth, a town of south-west Hertfordshire to Thomas Wilks (born Balham), a Director of Leather Co and his wife Jane Eliza (born St. Sepulchre, London), a Suffragette. He had one sister and four brothers including Maurice.

== Career ==
Wilks was initially trained as a solicitor, but his wife Kathleen Edith was a daughter of William Hillman, founder of the Hillman Motor Car Company, and so he became a joint manager in 1921 on the death of his father in law. In 1929, he left Hillman after disagreement with the Rootes brothers who took it over in 1928.

In September 1929, Wilks began employment as Works manager at the Rover Company in Coventry, having been invited by the Managing Director Frank Searle to join the board. By 1930, he was joined by his brother Maurice as Chief Engineer.

=== Land Rover ===
In 1947, he founded Land Rover around Maurice's design for a small, sturdy, economical, four wheel drive utility vehicle modelled on the Willys Jeep.

=== Managerial career ===
In 1934, he was appointed managing director of Rover, and became chairman in 1957. In 1962, although retired, he served as a non-executive director; and in 1967, he became President of Rover.

== Private life ==
Wilks married Kathleen Edith Hillman (b. 1891), one of the six daughters of William Hillman. He died on 10 March 1971, aged 79 at Glenegedale, Isle of Islay, Scotland.
