= British Leyland ECV3 =

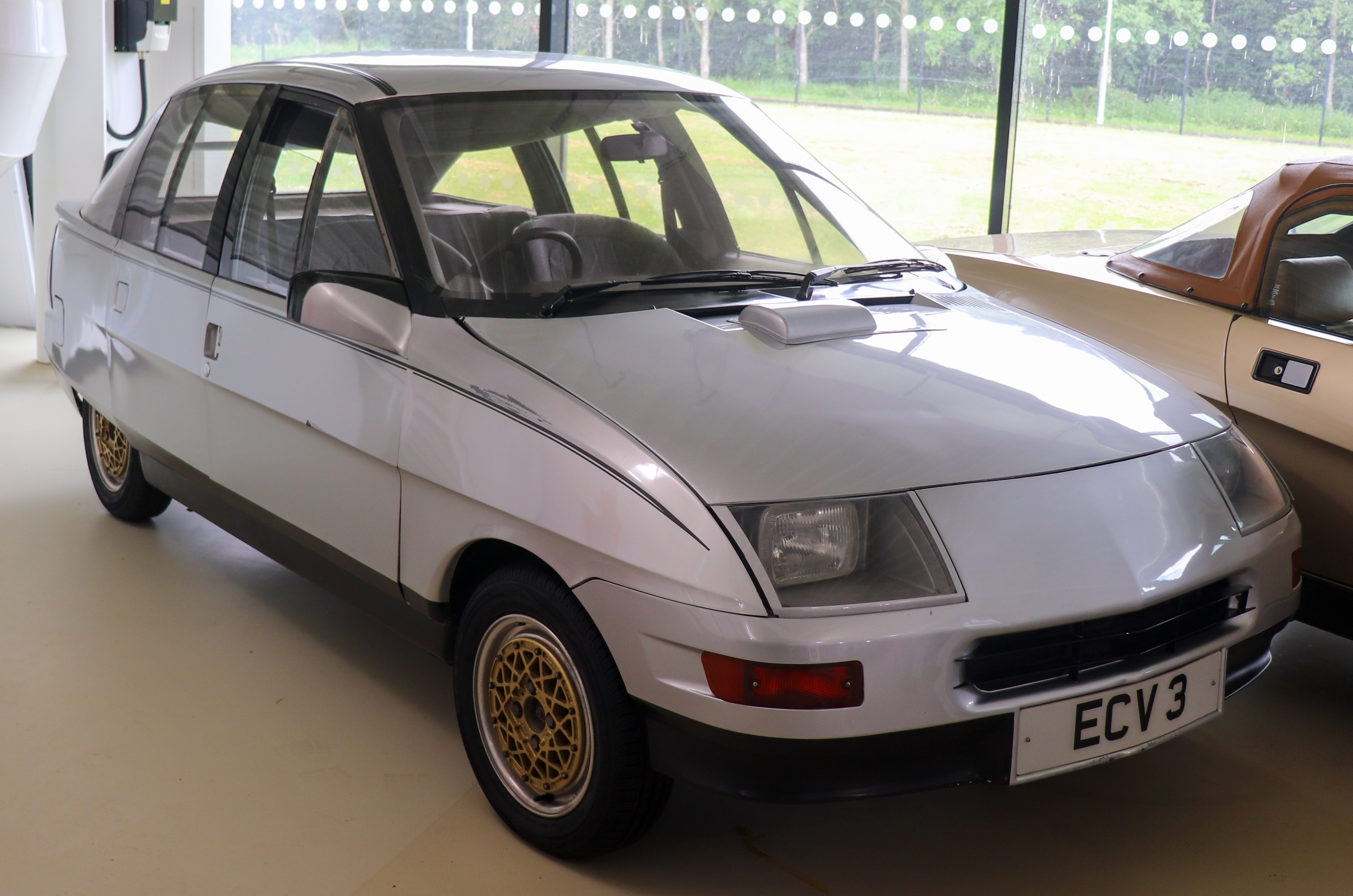

Overview
- Manufacturer: British Leyland
- Production: 1982 (prototype only)

Body and chassis
- Body style: Hatchback

Powertrain
- Engine: 1.1 L 3-cylinder petrol
- Transmission: 5-speed manual

Dimensions
- Length: 12 ft 7.2 in (3.84 m)

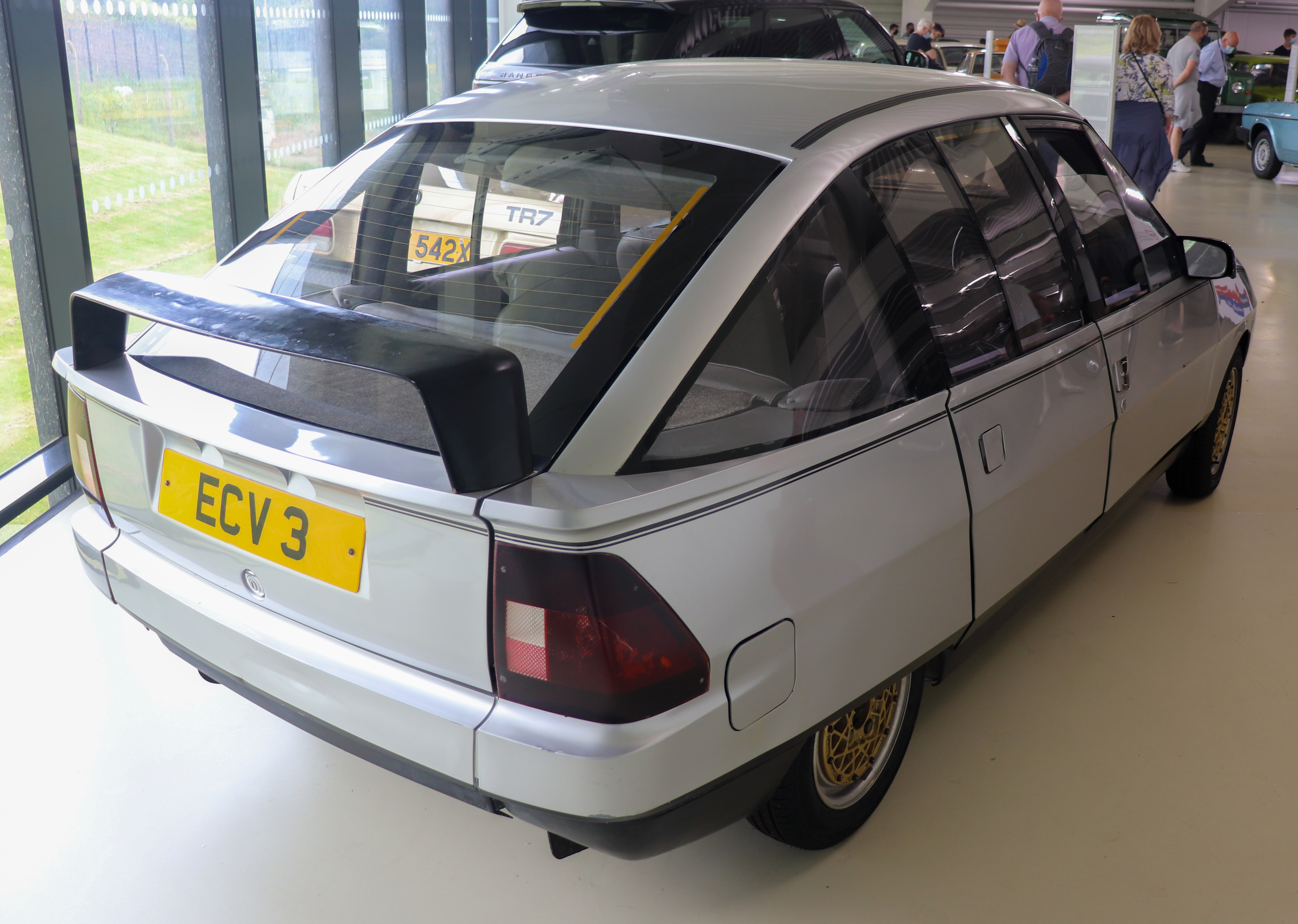
British Leyland ECV3 Rear

The ECV3 is a concept car developed by British Leyland's BL Technology division, led by Spen King. The ECV3 was first shown to the public in December 1982, and was the third in a series of Energy Conservation Vehicles that BL was developing, incorporating new engine technologies and construction materials. The prototype is on display at the Gaydon Heritage Motor Centre.

== Technical details ==
The ECV3 was powered by an experimental 3-cylinder, 12-valve 1.1 L (1113 cc) petrol engine, developing 72 bhp (54 kW; 73 PS) @ 5,800 rpm and torque of 72 lb⋅ft (98 N⋅m) @ 3,750 rpm, and mated to a manual 5-speed transmission. The engine was a lightweight 84 kg, and while the engine did not reach production, it did influence the design of the 1988 K-Series engine.

The car is built using an aluminium spaceframe chassis, co-developed with Alcan, and was the first ever bonded structure, and the body incorporates flexible plastic body panels made of polyurethane reinforced reaction injection moulding (PU-RRIM). The design of the five-door hatchback was unconventional, but resulted in a low drag coefficient of Cd=0.24. The car was claimed to have a top speed of 115 mph (185 km/h), and could accelerate from 0 to 60 mph in 11 seconds. Fuel economy was "impressive" with "81mpg at 56mph, 61mpg at 75mph, and 49mpg on the urban cycle."

The prototype also demonstrated packaging efficiency, being a short 12 ft 7.2 in (3.84 m) supermini sized car, but offering family car sized accommodation.
