= Hillman 20 =

Hillman Wizard 75; Hillman Twenty 70; Hillman Hawk; Hillman Seven Seater; Hillman 80
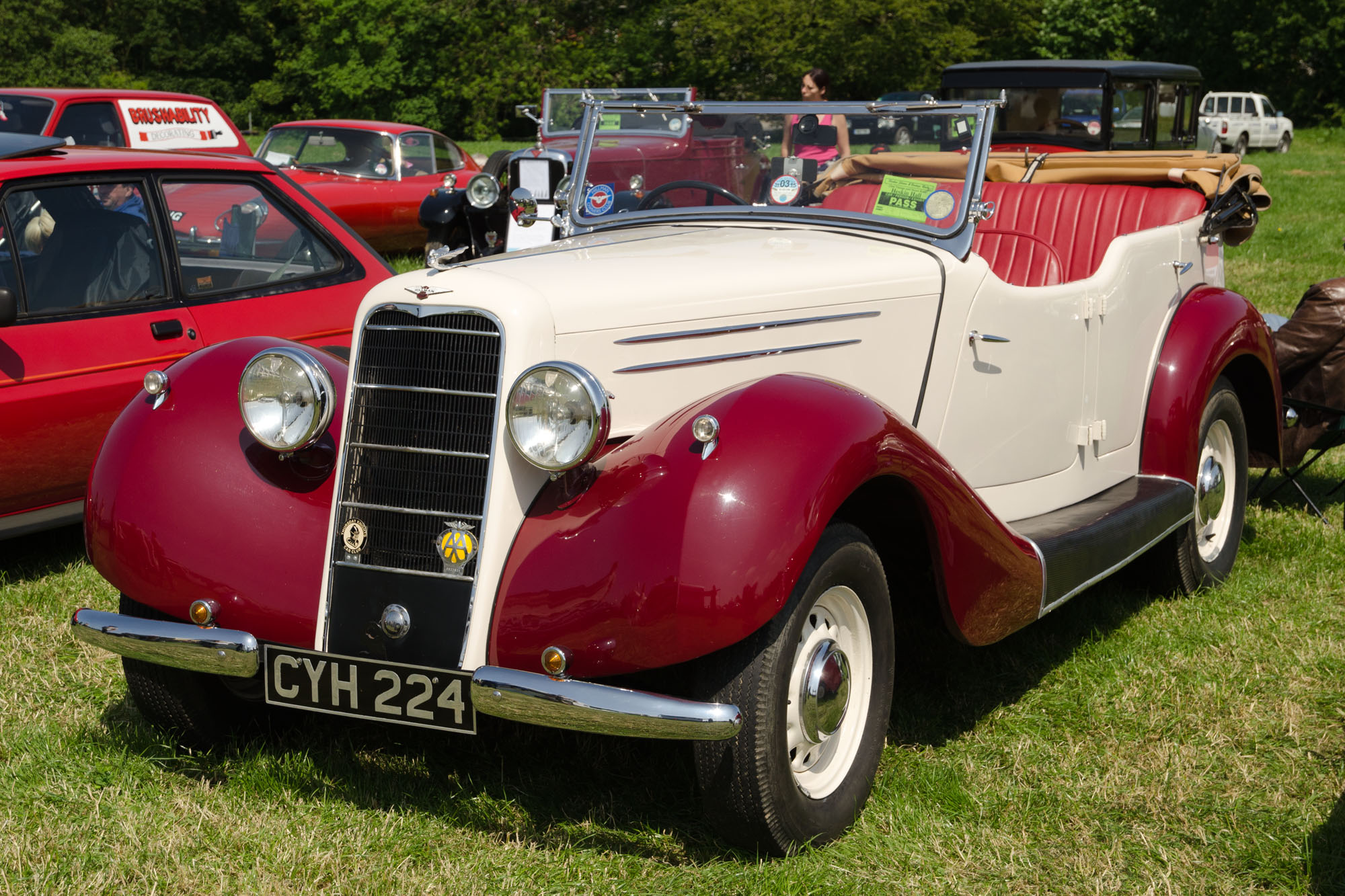
- Hawk sports tourer body by Martin Walter manufactured 1936

Overview
- Manufacturer: Hillman Motor Car Co Ltd
- Production: 1931–1938

Body and chassis
- Class: Executive car
- Body style: Wizard 75, 20/70 and Hawk: chassis only; family saloon; de luxe saloon; 4-door sports saloon; foursome drophead coupé; 5-seater open tourer; LWB 7-seater and 80: chassis only; saloon; limousine with division; landaulette with division
- Layout: FR

Powertrain
- Engine: Wizard 75, 20/70 and 7-seater: 2,810 cc (171 cu in); Hawk and 80: 3,181 cc (194.1 cu in)
- Transmission: engine, single dry-plate clutch and 4-speed gearbox with central gear lever (all mounted as a unit); open propeller shaft with metal joints; half-floating spiral bevel driven rear axle with banjo case

Dimensions
- Wheelbase: *Wizard 75; 111 in (2,819 mm); track 56 in (1,422 mm); *20/70; 108.5 in (2,756 mm); track 56 in (1,422 mm); *Hawk; 108.5 in (2,756 mm); track; F: 58 in (1,473 mm); R: 59.5 in (1,511 mm); *LWB Seven Seater and 80; 126 in (3,200 mm); track; *Seven seater 56 in (1,422 mm); *80 F: 58 in (1,473 mm); *80 R: 59.5 in (1,511 mm)
- Length: *Wizard: 166 in (4,216 mm) grid up; Twenty 70 176 in (4,470 mm)
- Width: *Wizard: 64 in (1,626 mm)
- Kerb weight: *Wizard chassis only: 19½ cwt, 2,184 lb (991 kg); *Wizard sports saloon: 30 cwt, 3,360 lb (1,520 kg); *Twenty 70 sports saloon 29½ cwt 3,304 lb (1,499 kg); *Hawk Wingham 33½ cwt 3,752 lb (1,702 kg)

Chronology
- Predecessor: Hillman Vortic
- Successor: Humber Snipe

Hillman 20 horsepower

Overview
- Manufacturer: Hillman Motor Car Co Ltd

Layout
- Configuration: Straight 6-cylinder
- Displacement: 2,810 cc (171.5 cu in); *3,181 cc (194.1 cu in)
- Cylinder bore: 75 mm (2.95 in)
- Piston stroke: 106 mm (4.17 in); *120 mm (4.72 in)
- Cylinder block material: cast iron; 4-bearing crankshaft; pistons have alloy heads and steel skirts
- Cylinder head material: cast iron; detachable, only connection is to radiator
- Valvetrain: side valves operated by gear-driven camshaft
- Compression ratio: 5.1:1

Combustion
- Fuel system: air cleaner, hot spot for mixture, mechanical fuel pump driven from camshaft supplies from rear tank, 4-branch inlet and 3-branch exhaust manifolds
- Management: dynamo with water pump driven by chain, coil ignition
- Fuel type: petrol
- Oil system: forced by pump, oil filter provided
- Cooling system: water pump, thermostat, fan (with adjustable fan belt), honeycomb radiator within V-front shell with chromium plated centre bar

Output
- Power output: *Wizard 75: 54 bhp (40 kW; 55 PS) @3,400 rpm; Tax horsepower 20.9; *20/70; *Hawk: 75 bhp (56 kW; 76 PS) @3,400 rpm

The Hillman Wizard 75, Hillman Twenty 70, Hillman Hawk and their long wheelbase variants Hillman Seven Seater and Hillman 80 models were a series of 20 horsepower (RAC rating) medium priced 5-7 seater executive cars made by Hillman during the 1930s.

Built at a time when body and chassis were quite separate structures Hillman's 20 horsepower chassis was given three different body shapes in five years and a grand total of five different names if the long wheelbase cars are included. The same body shapes and chassis were used for Hillman's 16 horsepower offering though that smaller engine was not offered with their long wheelbase cars.

Towards the end of the 1930s the badges of the current models were changed by the Rootes brothers to Humber Snipe.

== Hillman Wizard 75 ==
=== 1931 a completely new Hillman ===
"The Hillman Wizard, The car for the roads of the world" was designed by the Rootes brothers to capture new export markets and to continue their Super Snipe's challenge to "the American type of car". They were freshly in control of Humber as well as Hillman and Britain exported comparatively few cars.

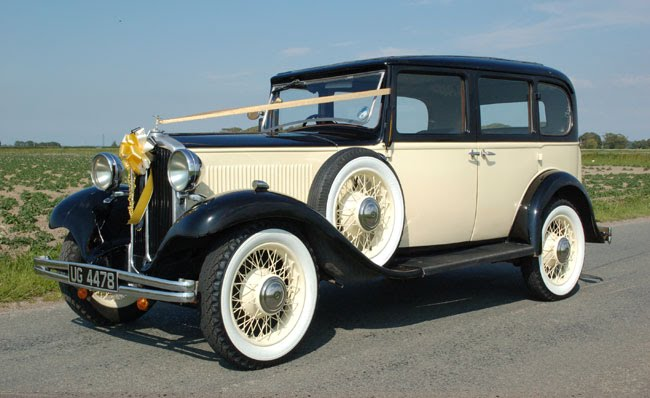
1933 Wizard 75 De Luxe

The new car was announced on the last Monday in April 1931, "a completely new Hillman". It was paired with a small bore 16 horsepower model of the same price intended for the UK domestic market where power was less important. This was only the second six-cylinder Hillman, previously they had been four or eight cylinder cars. Prior to the Wizard, the only six cylinder Hillman had been the 40, introduced in 1907 with a 9.7L six cylinder. Special features included: pressed steel body, silent third gear (hitherto all intermediate gears emitted a loud whine) or "traffic-top", front and rear bumpers, chromium plating. The body incorporates draught-free ventilation utilising vents in the scuttle with the rear quarter-lights.

The six-cylinder engine's valves are "side by side" and operated by a gear-driven camshaft. Pistons have steel skirts and aluminium heads. The crankshaft has been given four bearings. Particular attention has been paid to carburation which was a weak point of the Hillman Straight Eight. The new system is simple but incorporates a hot-spot heated by the engine's exhaust.

The chassis frame has five cross members and the frame is deep and as rigid as possible. The front axle has an H section with rectangular ends for torsional stress. Duo-Servo 4-wheel brakes are Bendix design operating, after two primary rods, by enclosed cables on 11 in (279 mm) drums. The springing is half-elliptical on both axles and they are controlled by double-acting hydraulic shock absorbers. The rear under-hung springs are 50 in (1,270 mm) long. Steering is by a worm and nut design. The cars are supplied with artillery wheels and a fixed roof, wire wheels and a sunshine roof are optional extras.

Headlamps are dip-and-switch.

A road test of the family saloon by The Times motoring correspondent published at the end of June 1931 noted that the seating for five passengers is comfortable and there is a wide view right round. The forward side windows can be wound right down but the large rear windows only as much as a third of the way. The opening windscreen is safety glass with one electric wiper and a reflecting mirror is provided. There are no ashtrays and there were slight squeaks in the body. A stoplight is fitted and a luggage grid. A spare artillery wheel and tyre are fitted in a well on the front wing. The always smooth and quiet engine pushed the car to a highest speed of about 65 miles per hour (105 km/h) after easily running up to 55 miles per hour (89 km/h). The brakes were very effective except when backing the car. Steering — light and steady.

A de luxe model was announced on 1 January 1932. Among its improvements were: new colour schemes, a luggage trunk on the grid at the rear, walnut dashboard and window fillets, special furniture hide, de luxe carpets and head-lining with a parcel net, indirect lighting for the instrument panel, larger thinner-rimmed steering wheel, double-barred bumpers, and three ashtrays.

In March 1933 Hillman announced that the Wizard had been given Cyclonic Induction providing "a power surge". This appears to have been a switch from an unspecified design of carburettor to a downdraught design.

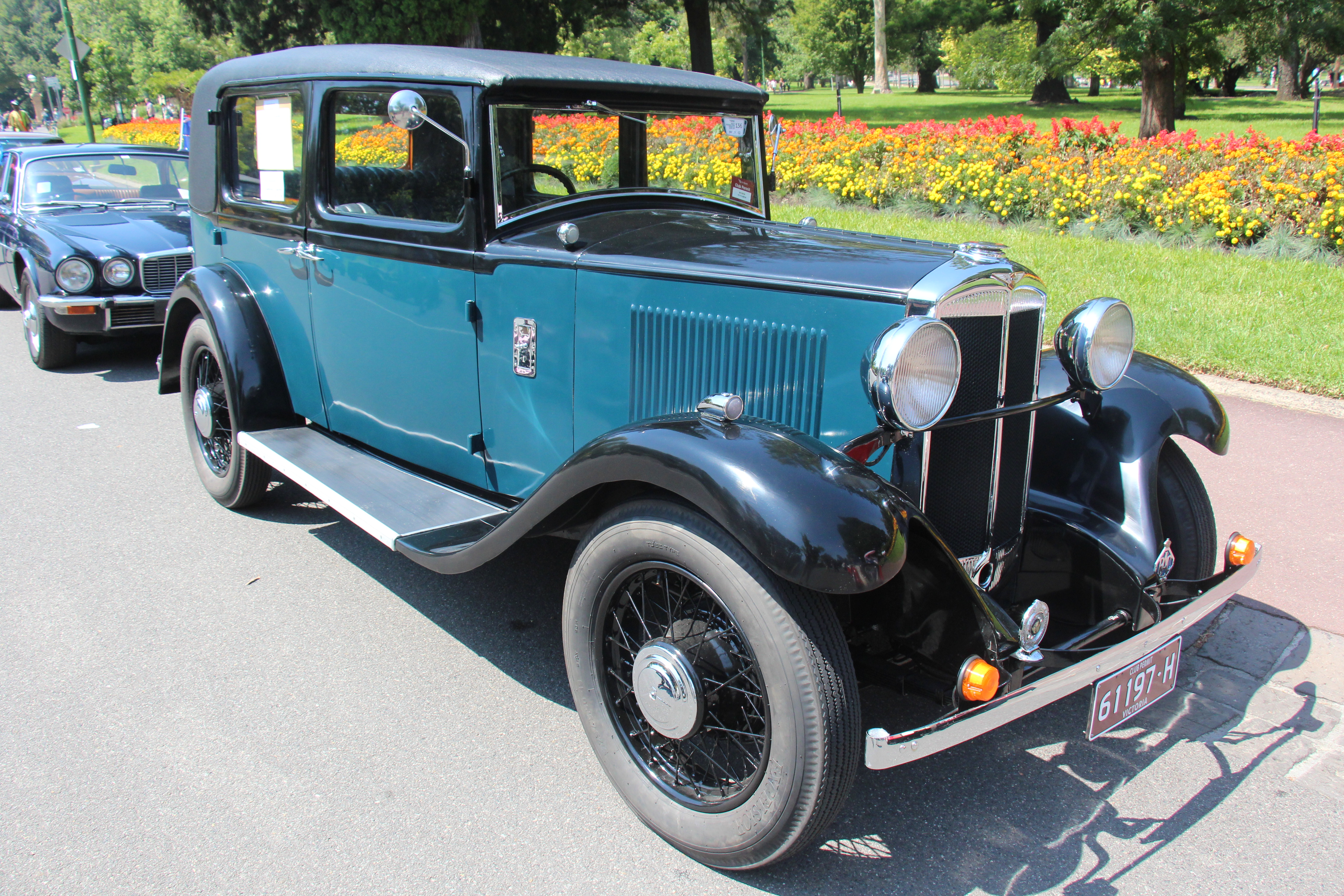
1932 Wizard 75 de luxe 4-light body - Martin & King, Melbourne

A new test by The Times published in July 1933 of the four-light (i.e. sports saloon) sun saloon de luxe reported that 70 miles per hour (110 km/h) is within the car's scope and without favourable conditions. It was noted the air shutters sometimes whistled but the review wound up with "The Wizard 75 gives the acceleration and speed of its medium-sized trans-atlantic rival (sic) with the refinement and economy of a British engineering product".

Just two months later in mid-September Hillman announced the Wizard's replacement, their new model Hillman 20/70, with new all-steel bodies and electric direction indicators.

== Hillman Twenty 70 ==
=== 1934 a revised body ===
The Wizard did not sell as well as planned and the cost of Pressed Steel's tooling has been spread across to this new model. The Twenty 70 body remains essentially the Wizard's but with new grilles, wings and rear valance.

The Twenty 70 announced in mid-September 1933 remains all-steel and now more streamlined. It has been given an outswept long-skirted tail in place of the former D-shape. There are separate chairs in front except on the Family saloon which has a three-seater single-piece bench seat at the front. Triplex safety glass is now throughout the car. There are dual screenwipers, a roof lamp, a rear blind which may be controlled from the driver's seat, locks on all doors and a driving mirror. A special design of bumpers is standard throughout the range. De luxe saloons have a sunshine roof, ash trays, cigar lighter, a parcel net on the ceiling and pillar pulls. A luggage grid was also fitted at the back of de luxe saloons.

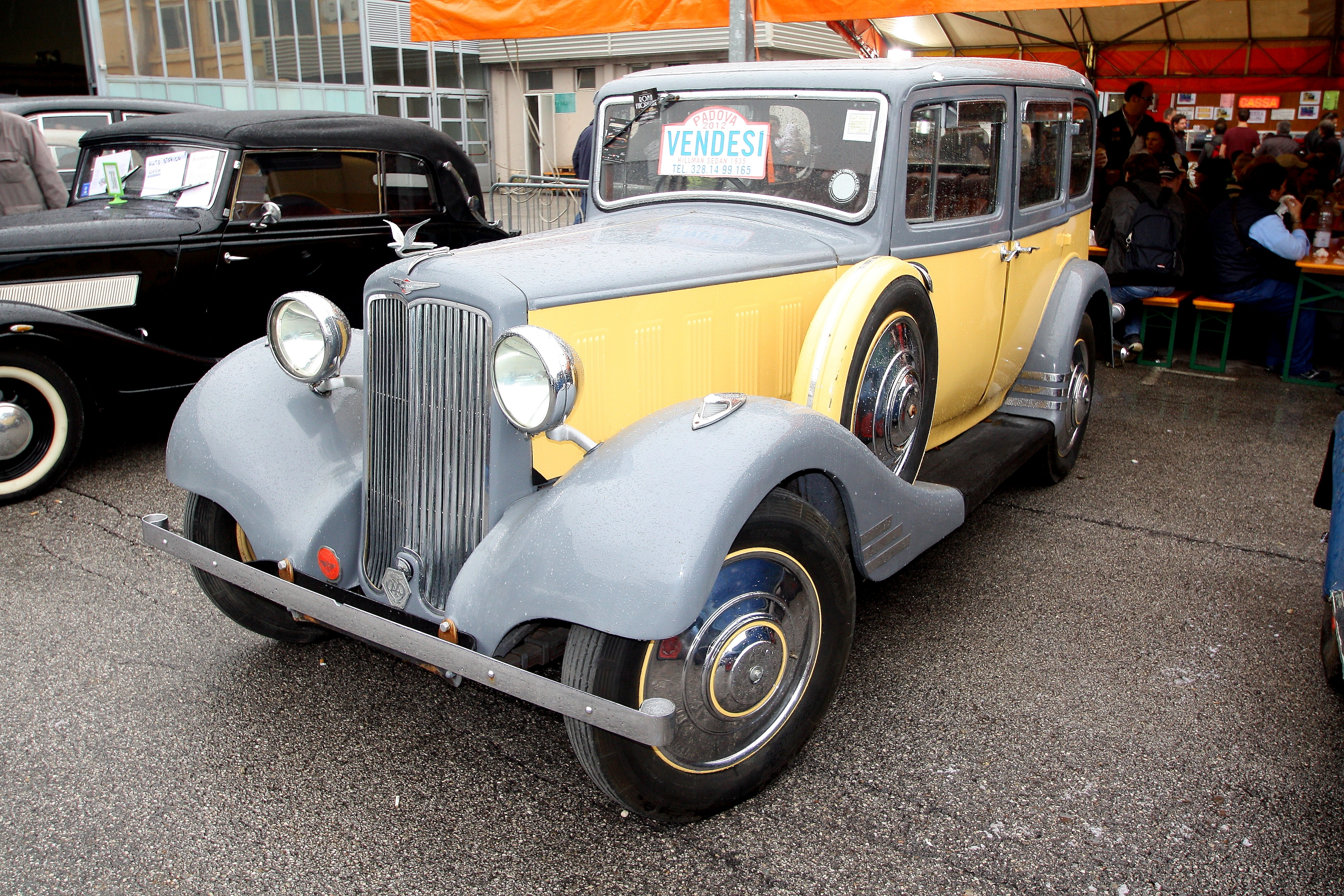
1935 Twenty 70 in Italy

The radiator grille or shell stylishly slopes back to match the new streamlined coachwork and its chromium-plated shutters are thermostatically controlled.

Electric direction indicators are fitted. Built into the body sides they are invisible unless in operation. They are controlled from the steering wheel and they are self-cancelling.

Every saloon has a wireless aerial installed in the saloon's roof. A Philco Transitone wireless set is available as an option. Hillman's small car range now included their Melody Minx.

As before as well as the saloons described above a sports saloon, a foursome drophead coupé and a five-seater (open) tourer are available Again the Seven Seater has a longer wheelbase and may be purchased as a saloon, limousine or landaulette. All three have a pair of occasional seats in the rear compartment, the limousine is an ideal mourning carriage.

While the new car's chassis is little changed from the Wizard the engine now provides Cushioned Power endowed by its new flexible mountings. The engine clutch and gearbox unit is suspended at three points on rubber. The four speed gearbox now has synchromesh between third and top and freewheel except on the cheapest "Family" model. All gears are "silent". The freewheel can be locked by a control on the facia. Startix optional engine starting is now fitted.

The Times tried driving the Seven Seater limousine, a long wheelbase version of the Twenty 70. It is mechanically identical except for the back axle which uses the lower ratio of the smaller engined sixteen. Driving was comfortable and all the controls functioned well, the steering was particularly good. The car was perfectly capable of 70 miles per hour (110 km/h) but the rear springs were too firm without a load in the car and some variable control should be provided. The car "is a remarkable job for the money".

=== 1935 ===
1935 models were distinguished by a radiator shell or grille painted in the body colour, the radiator filler cap moved under the bonnet and a chromium plated motif above the bonnet. A thermostatically controlled cut-out now allows the engine to fully warm before letting water circulate to the radiator.

The Times tried a 1935 model sports saloon. It described the engine as a good performer and one of the car's chief attractions. The car accomplished a good 70 miles per hour (110 km/h). The brakes need light pedal pressure. They tended to grab and affect the steering but this might have been on just this particular car. The synchromesh works well. "The outstanding characteristic in the appearance of this car is compactness". This sports saloon weighed 29½ cwt 3,304 lb (1,499 kg).

The Twenty 70 and 16 cars did not sell well in spite of the best efforts of William Rootes and his sales team. "The public still looked upon them as updated Wizards".

== Hillman Hawk ==
=== 1936 a new body and bigger 20 horsepower engine ===
A new streamlined body was announced in October 1935 with a new name for the 20, Hawk. Chassis design was by William Haynes assisted by Alec Issigonis. The modern all-steel semi-monocoque style body was designed by Thrupp & Maberly, London coachbuilders also owned by Rootes Group. The new body houses the spare wheel in the tail. Its new lines "are planned to flow smoothly from the radiator". . . "to the trunk at the rear with the streamlined well-valanced wings merging harmoniously into the whole". As before the sloping single-piece windscreen may be opened to give better vision in fog.

The new model's Superpower engine is enlarged 13 per cent achieved by lengthening its stroke by 14 mm. Although the cubic capacity rose from 2810 cc to 3181 cc this did not affect the car's tax rating because the RAC formula takes no account of an engine's stroke. The only other changes from the engine of the Twenty 70 were the introduction of replaceable hardened steel valve seats and improved steel-backed main bearings for the crankshaft. The instrument panel now has a rheostat switch to vary the lighting at will.

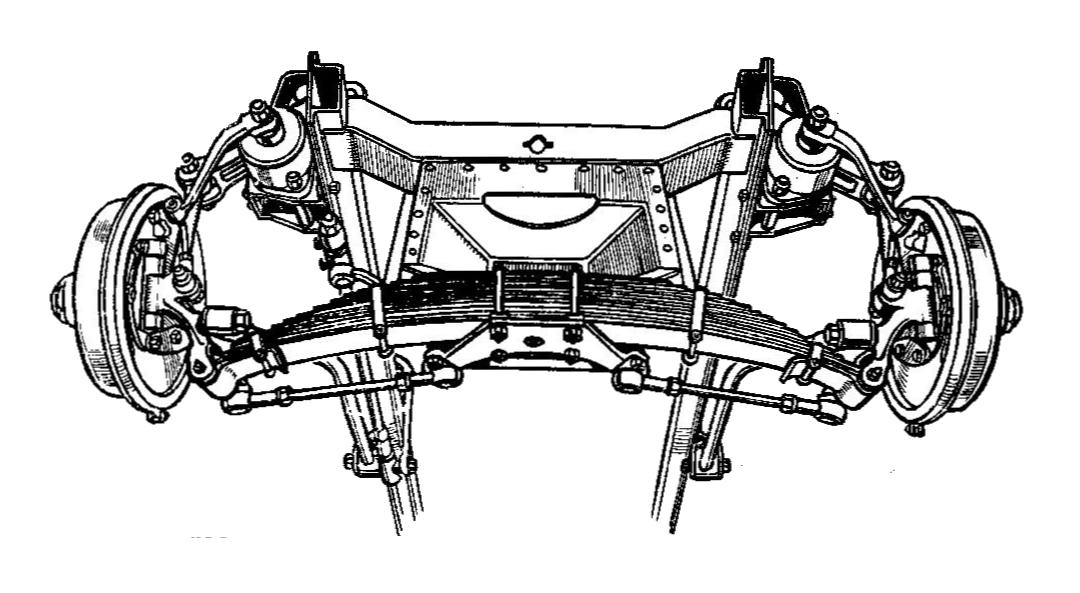
Rootes Group's Evenkeel independent front suspension unit

The Hawk's big changes from the Twenty 70 chassis are the introduction of the Rootes Group's Evenkeel independent front suspension by transverse leaf springs which gives the cars better road-holding and steering with a superior ride and, as well as that, the car's road-holding is further improved by a much wider track, increased from 56 in (1,422 mm) to 58 in (1,473 mm) in front and 59.5 in (1,511 mm) at the back.

In addition the chassis frame is "beefed up" to provide the rigidity required by the new independent front suspension. The channel section frame members have been replaced by box section members, the fourth side providing a frame advertised as "seven times stronger". The longitudinal members are box-girders and the four cross-members are of box-section. Previously, with chassis mounted on front and rear rigid axles, a controlled amount of flexing was thought desirable.

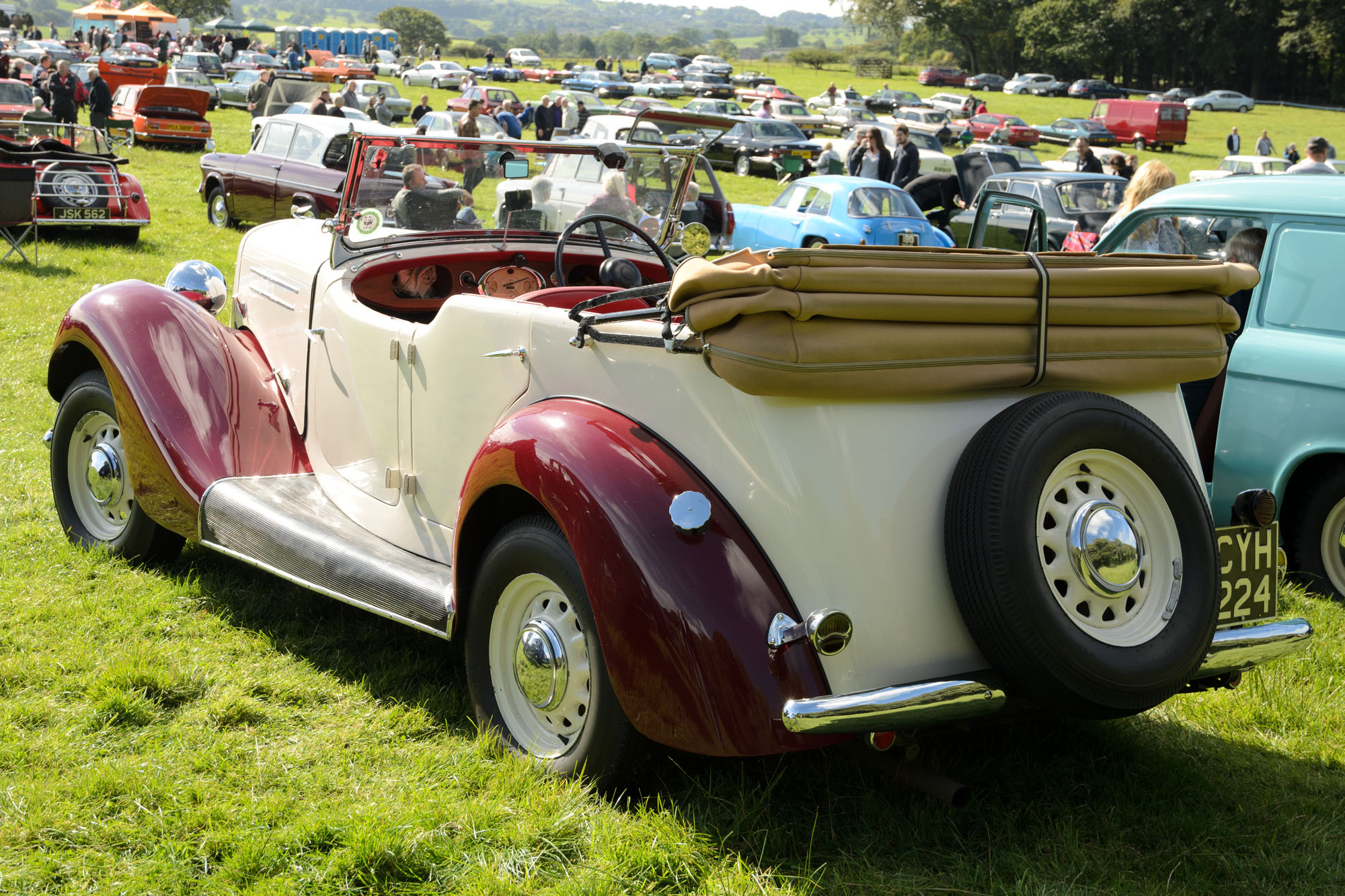
4-door sports tourer not a Wingham cabriolet

The most expensive catalogued Hawk was their Wingham convertible cabriolet listed at £435 compared with the family saloon's £295. The Times tried out the Wingham describing it as a double purpose five-seater and noting its roof may be folded by the driver from his seat by releasing its two clips to the windscreen. The side windows in the four doors wind up and down and the driver's view is clear except to the back of the car. The spare wheel is kept horizontally in the boot. It sharply restricts luggage space and though the lid folds out to form a platform for luggage the luggage then blocks access to the wheel. "Quietness of running makes speed deceptive." In the testers' opinion the car would not be stressed by being driven at 75 miles per hour (121 km/h) and it should cruise comfortably at 70 miles per hour (110 km/h). The newspaper specially noted that since the test all new production front spring leaves have been polished giving a much easier movement at low speeds.

=== 1937 ===
There is no change to the cars but there are significant price reductions all round and a new Safety saloon with Triplex safety glass all round is listed in place of last season's Family saloon. The cars are heavily advertised with the statements "Tested approved and ordered by His Majesty's War Office, the Royal Air Force, the Metropolitan and Provincial Police and other great public services at home and overseas."

The Times tried the 80 enclosed limousine from the driving seat and reported the engine is well balanced, smooth in operation because of its rubber mounts and lively, "quiet as well as silky". 70 miles per hour (110 km/h) can be reached on top gear.

=== 1938 a new Humber Snipe ===
October 1937 Earls Court Motorshow. The old Hawk, now the Humber Snipe —and the old Hillman Sixteen now a Humber Sixteen— is displayed without further comment on Humber's stand

== Production ==
About 700 Hillman "16"s were built between 1936-37 whereas around 5000 Hillman "Hawk"s were built during the same period and an estimated 300 Hillman "80"s were constructed between 1936-38. These models were produced as standard saloons and deluxe saloons, some of which were used by the military, police and government departments, with a small number of each model being produced as sports tourers, cabriolets and coupes, the bodywork being converted by coachbuilders Thrupp & Maberly and Wingham (Martin Walter).

=== Survivors ===
Only a few examples of each model still exist in the UK today. Some of these vehicles were exported throughout the world, especially to Australia and New Zealand where a number of "Hawk"s and "80"'s also still survive.

== Notes ==
- Culshaw; Horrobin (1974). Complete Catalogue of British Cars. London: Macmillan. ISBN 0-333-16689-2.
- Miller, Judith and Martin (1992). Collectors Cars Price Guide 1992-1993 (Volume II). Tenterden, Kent: Millers Publications of Reed International Books Ltd. p. 139. ISBN 0-905879-74-0.
- Sedgwick, M. (1989). A-Z of Cars of the 1930s. Devon, UK: Bay View Books. ISBN 1-870979-38-9.
- Vanderveen, Bart H. (1973). British Cars of the Late Thirties 1935-1939: Olyslager Auto Library. London: Frederick Warne & Co Ltd. pp. 29, 45 and 59. ISBN 0-7232-1712-2. OCLC 858340.
- "Classic Car Catalogue - The World's Largest Collection of Images and the History of Cars 1930 to 1969 - Rootes/Hillman 1936-38". Classic Car Catalogue.
- "Motoring by Accelerator - Hillman Hawk: A Car for the Connoisseur". The Argus. Melbourne, Victoria): (Trove Digitised Archive of the National Library of Australia. 31 March 1936.
- "Motoring by Accelerator - Hillman Hawk in "The Argus" Road Test". The Argus. Melbourne, Victoria): (Trove Digitised Archive of the National Library of Australia. 15 June 1937.
- "New Hillman Release Replaces Hawk Model". The Argus. Melbourne, Victoria): (Trove Digitised Archive of the National Library of Australia. 21 June 1938.
- "Motors and Motorists by Traveller - 1937 Hillman Hawk Features Include "Evenkeel" Suspension". The Courier-Mail. Brisbane, Queensland): (Trove Digitised Archive of the National Library of Australia. 22 March 1937.
- "Motoring and Motorcycling by Traveller - The Courier-Mail Road Test 1938 Humber Snipe". The Courier-Mail. Brisbane, Queensland): (Trove Digitised Archive of the National Library of Australia. 2 May 1938.
- Ward, Leonard (19 June 1936). "Motors and Motoring - British Car Suitable for Australia: Hillman Hawk Revealed First Rate Performance in Road Test". The Land. Sydney, New South Wales): (Trove Digitised Archive of the National Library of Australia.
- "Motoring - Road Test The Hillman Hawk : British Car for Australia". The Sydney Morning Herald. Sydney, New South Wales): (Trove Digitised Archive of the National Library of Australia. 2 June 1936.
- Instruction Book for Hillman Hawk, Sixteen and 80. Coventry: Hillman Motor Car Co Ltd. 1936. OCLC 499777562.
- Hillman Sixteen, Hawk and "80": Service Parts Catalogue 1936, 1937, 1938 Models (1938 "80" Limousine only). Coventry: Hillman Motor Car Company Ltd. September 1945. OCLC 500340256.
- Hillman Present the Minx Magnificent and the "Hawk", "Sixteen" and "80" - includes a List of Models for 1936. Coventry: Hillman Motor Car Co Ltd. March 1936.
