= Arthur Goddard (engineer) =

British-Australian automotive engineer (1921–2022)

- Born: 31 January 1921
- Died: 11 August 2022 (aged 101); Brisbane, Australia
- Education: Little Sutton Church of England Primary School
- Occupation: Engineer
- Known for: Development of the Land Rover

Arthur Goddard (31 January 1921 – 11 August 2022) was a British-Australian engineer, who worked at the Rover Company from 1945 to 1957 and was in charge of the Land Rovers engineering development from 1947 to 1957.

== Personal life ==
Goddard was the second son of John Newman Goddard. Goddard went to the Little Sutton Church of England Primary School in Ellesmere Port, Cheshire. After schooling, he completed a Mechanical Engineering Certificate at a college in Liverpool.

Goddard reached 100 in January 2021. He died in Brisbane on 11 August 2022, at the age of 101.

== Rover ==
Goddard began working on testing World War II aero engines, for problems in operating at high altitude. He continued this field of work moving down to Coventry and working at Alvis in the Aero Engine research lab where they tested all kinds of wartime aircraft engines from both sides and all countries.

Towards the end of the war the Rover Company suddenly needed an engineer with experience in the Rolls-Royce Merlin engine for their own Meteor project based on the Merlin engine for use in tanks. Rover's head of Engine Development had crashed his motorcycle and broken both his legs and was laid up for quite a while. Goddard was interviewed by Maurice Wilks and got the job filling in. Once war had really ended in Europe in 1945, Maurice Wilks, eager to get back in the car game, took Goddard straight off the Meteor project and put him onto Rover cars, and developing Rover's new 4- and 6-cylinder IOE engines, and then he moved on to vehicle testing in noise and vibration. This led to heading up the research areas of the company and being one of the few broadly experienced engineers in the company, rather than a specialist in one area.

== Land Rover ==
The Land Rover project idea had been Maurice Wilks from finding out how useful his old Wartime Jeep was at light farming and small jobs about the place. Wilks had found the Jeep particularly useful during the hard winter of 1947 but also great on beach at Anglesey, where the Wilks family had a holiday home. The idea for the Land Rover as a vehicle for Rover to manufacture was first thought up at Anglesey. The British Government was bringing in some strict rationing for steel supply for car companies unless they concentrated very strongly on export. The Land Rover had huge export potential for Rover, so the engineering programme developed quickly. A team was made up of engineers to get the 'Land Rover' project going. Overall Maurice Wilks was the technical director and Robert Boyle was chief engineer at Rover. Goddard was development engineer and put in charge of the overall Land Rover test and development programme in 1947. Through the late 40s and early 50s Goddard was in charge of a fleet of development vehicles that led to the development of the Land Rover Defender range today. Goddard became Rover's assistant chief engineer of Rover cars and Land Rovers in 1952. Once the Land Rover Series 2 design was finished Goddard moved on from Rover in 1957 to become the technical director of Girling brakes. After he left Rover, Arthur's old job was so big as the company had grown it was split in two. He was replaced by Chris Goode on the Rover Cars engineering and by Jack Pogmore who was in charge of the Land Rovers engineering until 1962. Tom Barton one of the original team from 1947 was put in charge of the Land Rovers Engineering after Pogmore had been moved to an administration role. Arthur Goddard had been working on Rover cars in the area of noise and vibration as the Land Rover programme began and ran the development department. Part of the brief to develop the Land Rover idea but also to find out as much as they could about farming machinery and potential uses for the new vehicle, which was hugely successful from its launch at the 1948 Amsterdam Motor Show. Numerous photos exist of Goddard and his development driver Johnny Cullen testing the first pre-production Land Rover.

During this time at Rover he also worked on Rover Gas Turbine project and the fitting of a Gas Turbine engine into a Rover car to make the Rover JET1 car.

== Girling ==
Goddard moved to Lucas Girling and Girling Brakes in 1957 to become technical director. Rover and Lucas had been very close since the 1930s. While at Girling he played a key role in the future of disc brake systems on standard road vehicles. He stayed at Girling until 1970. He also held a seat on the Lucas Girling board at this time. He then moved to Australia as managing director of Automotive and Girling Australia, manufacturers of braking components for Australian vehicle manufacturers. Goddard's experience was sought in an Australian Government enquiry in 1975 in regards to the standard of Australian-manufactured vehicles brakes in comparison to those from vehicles manufactured in other countries, which led to a change in the standard of braking for Australian vehicles. Throughout his career he has worked with many leading automotive engineers, including Spen King, Alec Issigonis, Norman Dewis and Giulio Alfieri.

Goddard was latterly chief engineer of his own family-run business, Vehicle Components Pty Ltd, renamed Cruisemaster, in Brisbane, Australia, that specialize in off-road trailer and caravan hitches and suspension systems.

== Rediscovery ==
Goddard's story was rediscovered in 2009, 61 years after the Land Rover was introduced. A young Australian early Land Rover enthusiast, Alex Massey's family owned a business opposite Goddard's family business in Brisbane, Australia. Massey mentioned this connection to Land Rover historian and friend Michael Bishop in passing conversation. Bishop had been collating data on early engineering prototype Land Rovers for a number of years, many of which were dispatched directly to Goddard in the late 1940s and instantly knew his name.

In a joint effort by Massey and Bishop, and series of interviews were planned and put to Arthur to look at the early days of the vehicle's development and production from an insider's point of view. Subsequently, detailed recollections from Goddard were published in the club magazine of The Land Rover Register 1948 to 1953, Full Grille in May 2009 and led to a visit back to the Land Rover factory by Goddard in April 2010, 62 years to the day on which the Land Rover was launched.

Goddard's career with the Land Rover was covered in the August 2010 Edition of Classic & Sports Car magazine.

In 2011, the information about Arthur Goddard's career at Land Rover was drawn together into a book, "They Found Our Engineer".

Arthur has since become the patron of a local Australian Land Rover enthusiast club and interviewed numerous times about the vehicle's origins. During 2015 he returned to the UK to see the vehicle in its last year of production. He was publicly reunited with the first Land Rover at the 2015 Goodwood Revival meet, which he had used for test and in 1948 Land Rover launch footage shown on British Movietone news.

Arthur also helped with the two millionth Solihull production Land Rover that was auctioned for charity.
