= Maurice Wilks =

English automotive and aeronautical engineer

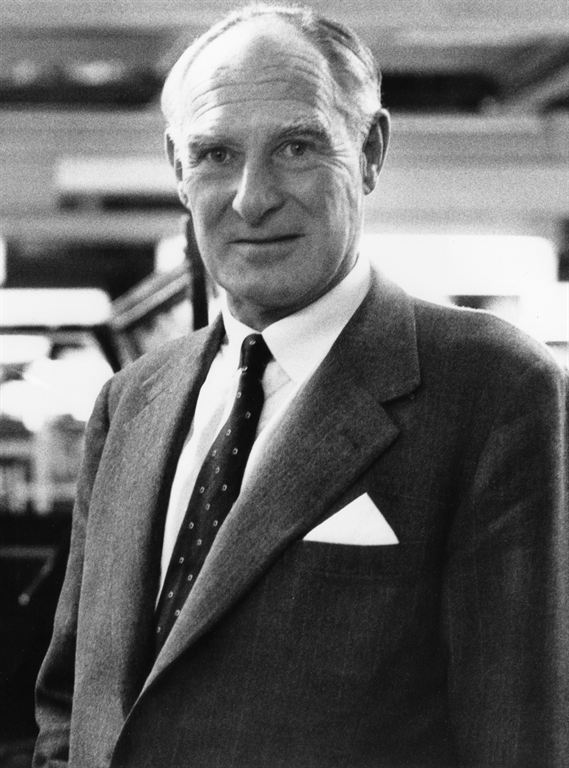
- Born: Maurice Fernand Cary Wilks; 19 August 1904; Eastoke, Hayling Island, Hampshire, England
- Died: 8 September 1963 (aged 59); Newborough, Anglesey, Wales
- Known for: Car design engineer
- Relatives: Spencer Wilks (brother)

Maurice Fernand Cary Wilks (19 August 1904 – 8 September 1963) was an English automotive and aeronautical engineer, and by the time of his death in 1963, was the chairman of the Rover Company. He was the founder of the Land Rover marque and responsible for the inspiration and concept work that led to the development of the first Land Rover off-road utility vehicle.

== Early life ==
Wilks was born on 19 August 1904 on Hayling Island, Hampshire, England, the youngest of five sons and one daughter of Thomas Wilks (born Balham), a director of Leather Co and his wife Jane Eliza (born St. Sepulchre, London), a Suffragette. One of his brothers was Spencer Wilks who became managing director, chairman and president of the Rover Car Company. He was educated at Malvern College.

He married Barbara Martin-Hurst in 1937.

== Career ==
Maurice Wilks worked from 1922 to 1926 for the Hillman Motor Car Company in Coventry. In 1926 he went to work for General Motors in the United States but after two years in the U.S., returned to England and Hillman.

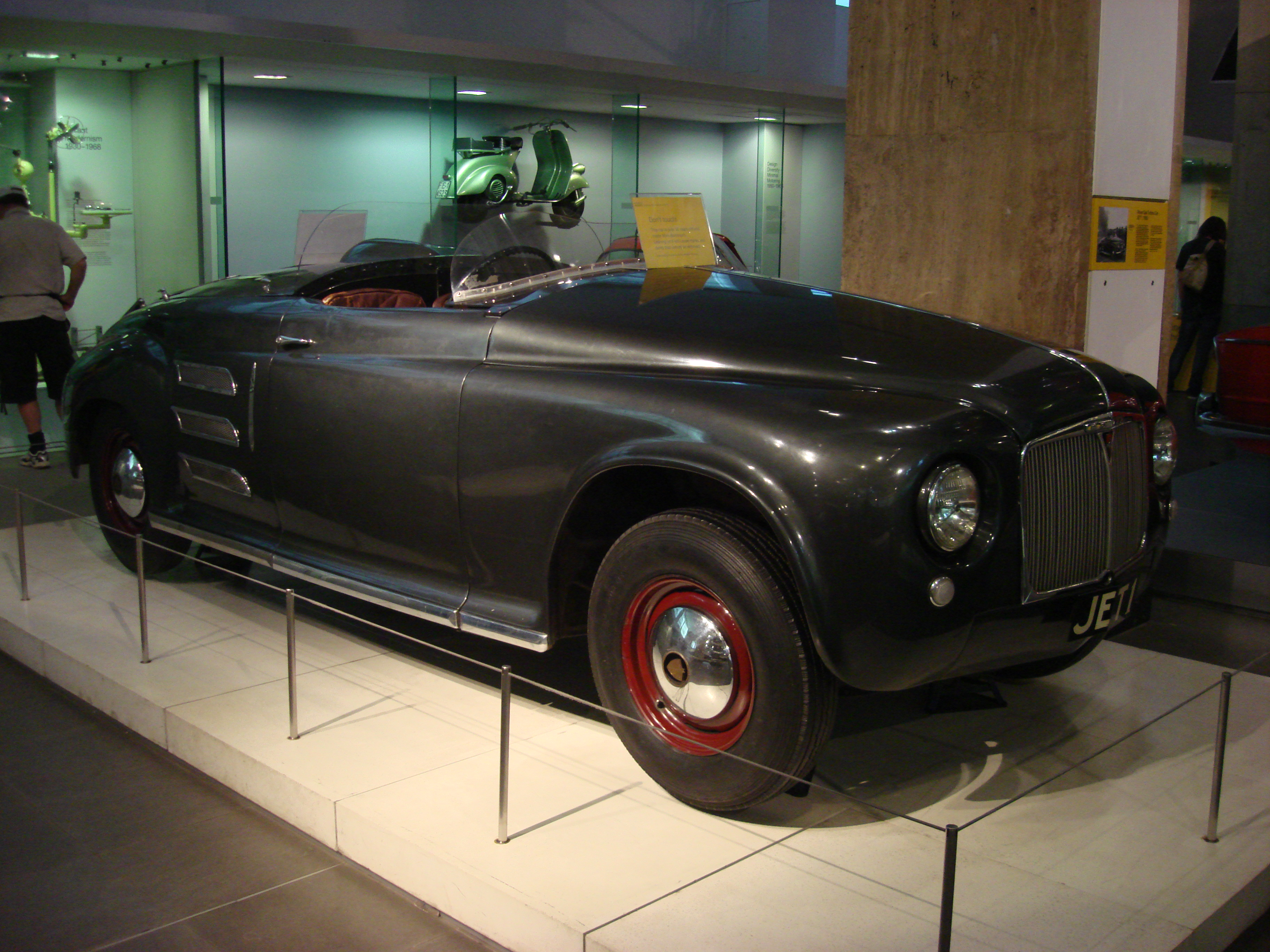
Rover gas turbine powered car

Wilks remained at Hillman as a planning engineer until 1930, when he moved to the Rover Company as chief engineer following his much older brother, Spencer. Spencer Wilks had been brought in from Hillman in September 1929 by Rover's Frank Searle made general manager and given a seat on Rover's board the following year. Spencer would be appointed managing director of Rover from 1932

In 1930 Spencer and Maurice Wilks on Spencer's appointment to the board made the important decision to make only high quality cars.

During World War II, Wilks led Rover's team developing Frank Whittle's gas turbine aircraft engines. Experiencing difficulties with Whittle's team Rover passed the project to Rolls-Royce in 1943. After the war, Wilks continued working with gas turbine engines, leading to Rover unveiling the first gas turbine powered car in 1949.

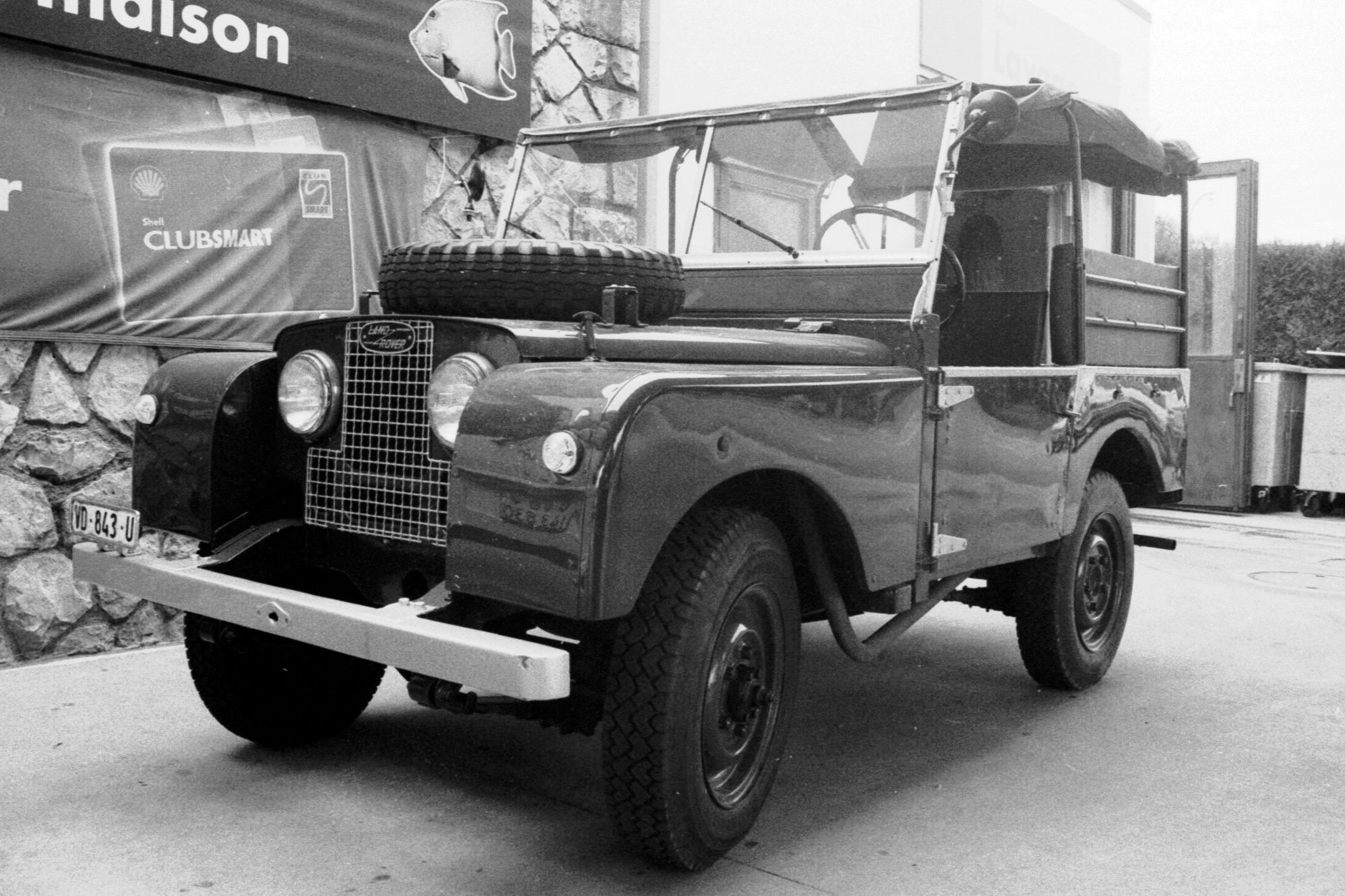
Land Rover Series I

Shortly after the war, whilst at his farm in Anglesey, Wilks, who used an army surplus Willys Jeep for farm work, and his brother Spencer who was visiting him, were inspired to develop and produce a utility four-wheel-drive vehicle for farmers, and the name Land Rover was coined for it.

By the summer of 1947 Rover had built a prototype Land Rover vehicle based on a Jeep chassis. In September 1947, the Rover company authorised the production of 50 pre-production models for evaluation purposes. The Land Rover was launched to the world at the 1948 Amsterdam Motor Show.

Maurice Wilks was a leading light in the establishment and development of the proving ground facilities of the Motor Industry Research Association.

Maurice Wilks remained chief engineer until appointed technical director in 1946. He was appointed joint managing director with brother Spencer Wilks in August 1956 and succeeded his brother as managing director in November 1960. In January 1962 preferring policy to day-to-day management he was appointed chairman of the Rover Company in succession to his older brother Spencer Wilks. The managing director appointment was given to W F F Martin-Hurst.

== Death ==
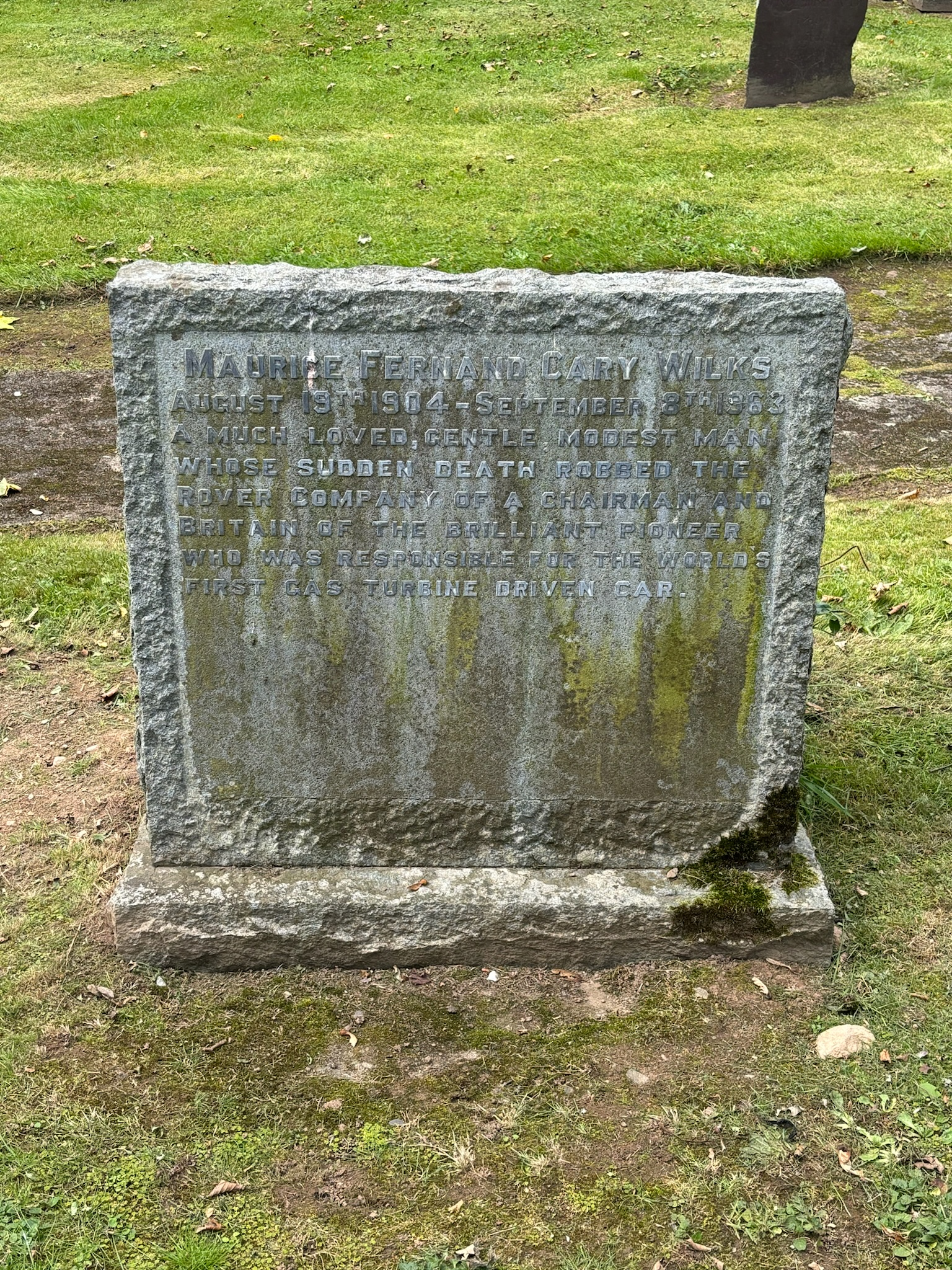
Maurice Wilks gravestone in Anglesey

Wilks died at his farm near Newborough, Anglesey, on 8 September 1963. He was 59.

His obituary in The Times described him as shunning publicity but added that he was farsighted and regarded as one of the industry's outstanding engineers with a brilliant knowledge of engineering detail. He was survived by his wife and three children.

He is buried in the churchyard of St Mary's Church at Llanfairpwllgwyngyll on Anglesey.

The inscription on his gravestone reads:

MAURICE FERNAND CARY WILKS

AUGUST 19TH 1904 - SEPTEMBER 8TH 1963

A MUCH LOVED, GENTLE MODEST MAN

WHOSE SUDDEN DEATH ROBBED THE

ROVER COMPANY OF A CHAIRMAN AND

BRITAIN OF THE BRILLIANT PIONEER

WHO WAS RESPONSIBLE FOR THE WORLD'S

FIRST GAS TURBINE DRIVEN CAR

== Wilks family ==
From the early 1930s, until merged with British Leyland, Rover had much of the nature of a family business.

- Maurice Wilks's elder brother, Spencer Bernau Wilks (1891–1971), was general manager from September 1929 then managing director of Rover from 1932 until 1957 when he was appointed chairman of the board of directors. Spencer was hired by Rover managing director, Frank Searle, from his position of joint (with John Black) managing director of Hillman following the purchase of Hillman by the Rootes brothers. Spencer brought Maurice from Hillman to Rover the following year to be Rover's chief engineer.

Aged 70 Spencer retired from the chair in favour of his much younger (13 years) brother at the beginning of 1962 remaining on the board in a non-executive capacity. He was made president of Rover in 1967.

- William Martin-Hurst (1905–1988) Rover's well-liked managing director, was a Maurice Wilks relative by marriage.
- Peter Wilks (1920–1972), son of Geoffrey Wilks, took over his uncle Maurice Wilks' technical directorship in 1963 and later became engineering director but he retired for health reasons in July 1971 when only 51 and died the following year.
- Spencer King (1925–2010) was a nephew of Spencer and Maurice Wilks. He took over as technical director on the retirement of Peter Wilks.

Spencer Wilks and John Black of the Standard Motor Company married sisters, daughters of William Hillman bicycle and automobile manufacturer.
