= Hillman =

British automobile marque

Hillman Motor Car Company
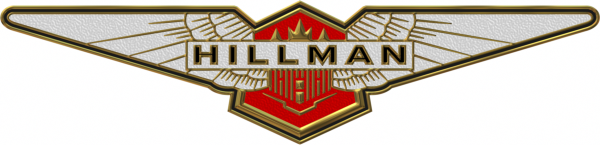
- Formerly: Hillman-Coatalen Company (1907–10)
- Industry: Automotive
- Founded: 1907; 119 years ago
- Founder: William Hillman & Louis Coatalen
- Defunct: 1931; 95 years ago
- Fate: Company merged to Rootes Group, which kept the brand active
- Successor: Rootes Group
- Headquarters: Ryton-on-Dunsmore, England
- Products: Automobiles
- Parent: Humber (1929–31)

Hillman was a British automobile marque created by the Hillman-Coatalen Company, founded in 1907, and renamed the Hillman Motor Car Company in 1910. The company was based in Ryton-on-Dunsmore, near Coventry, England. Before 1907, the company had built bicycles. Newly under the control of the Rootes brothers, the Hillman company was acquired by Humber in 1928. Hillman was used as the small-car marque of Humber Limited from 1931, but Hillman continued to sell large cars until 1937. The Rootes brothers reached a 60% holding in Humber in 1932, which they retained until 1967, when Chrysler bought Rootes and bought out the remaining 40% of Humber's shareholders. The marque continued to be used under Chrysler until 1976.

== History ==
=== Origins ===
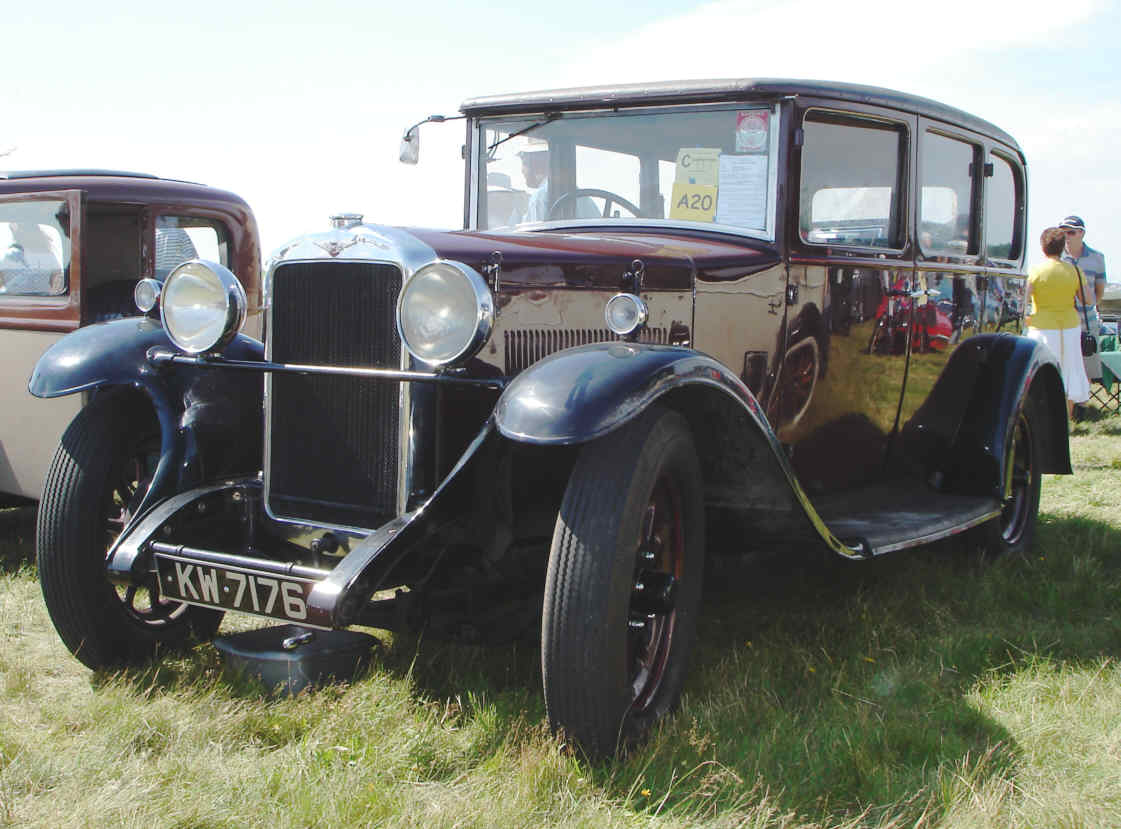
Fourteen 1929, 2-litre 4-cylinder

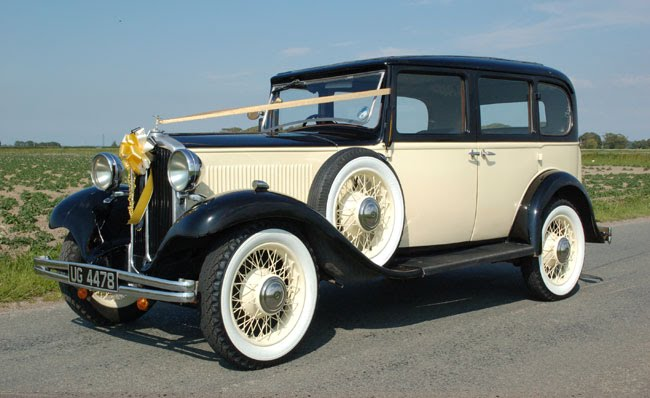
Wizard 1932, 3-litre 6-cylinder

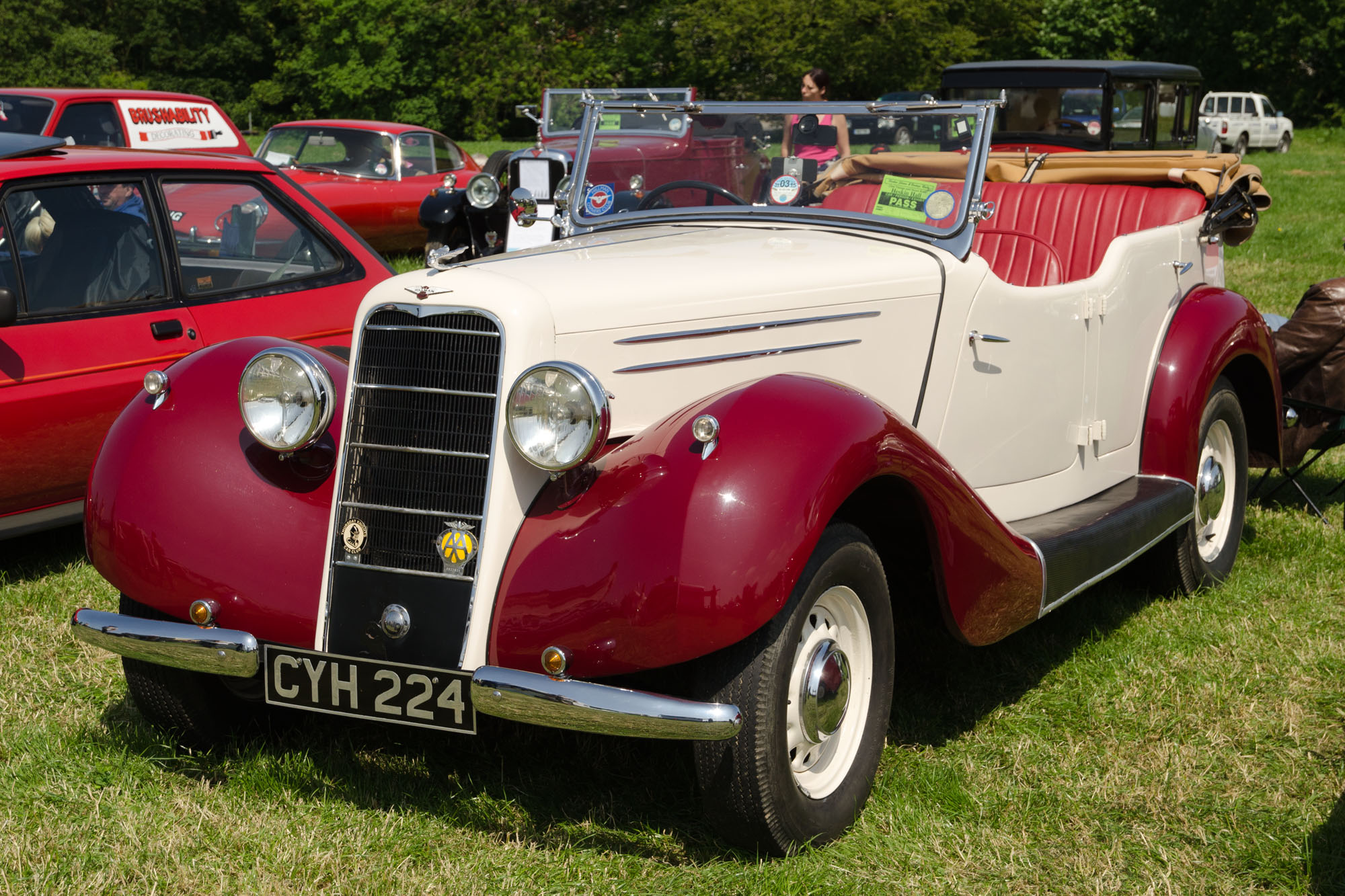
Hawk 1936, 3-litre 6-cylinder

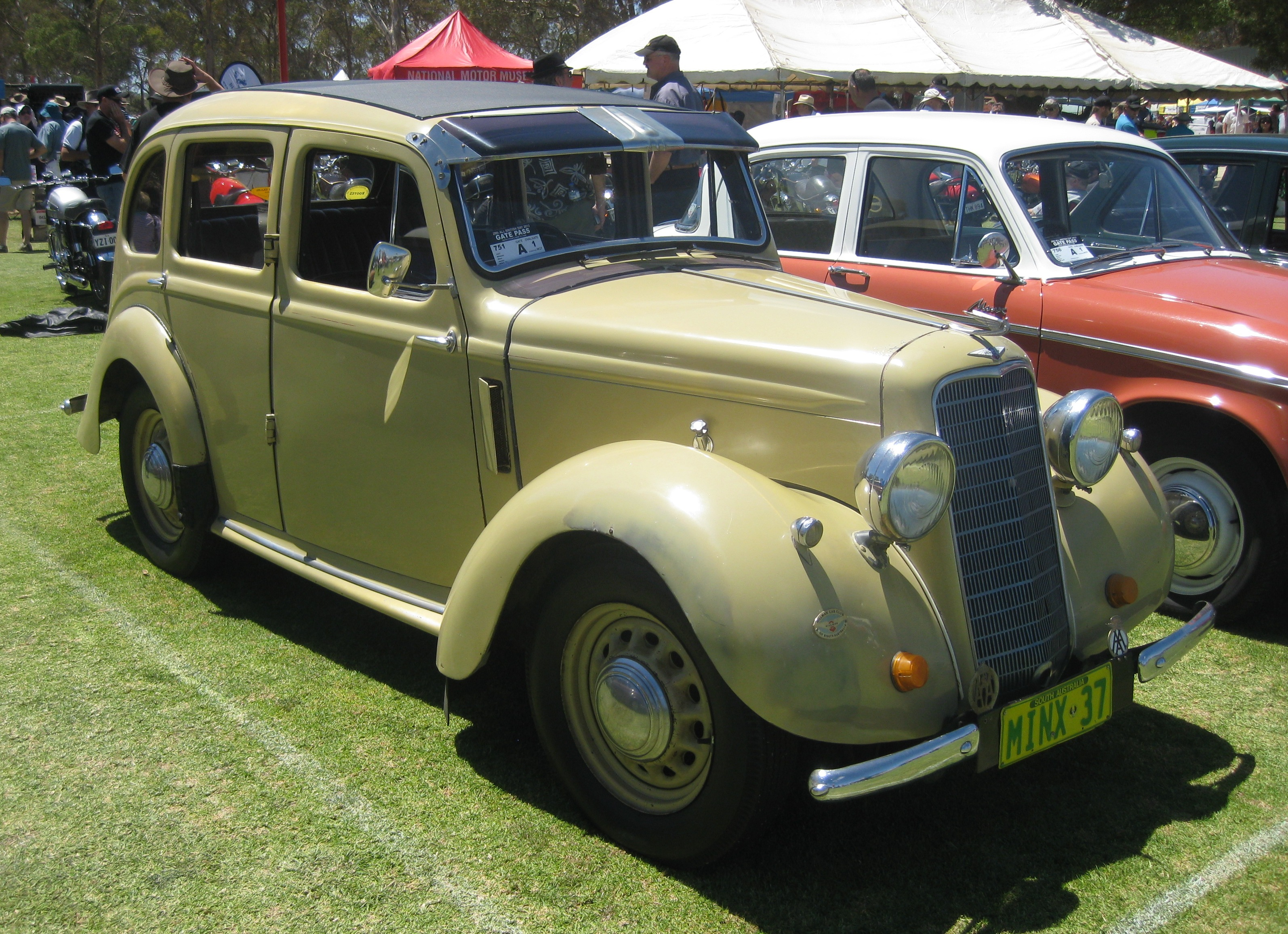
Minx 1937, 1185 cc 4-cylinder

In 1857 Josiah Turner and James Starley formed the Coventry Sewing Machine Company, and recruited skilled engineers from the London area to join them, one of whom was William Hillman. In 1869 the firm changed its name to the Coventry Machinists Company, and like many other manufacturers in the area embarked on producing velocipedes. In 1870 Hillman and Starley patented a new bicycle called the "Ariel" and by 1885 Hillman was a partner of the bicycle manufacturer Hillman Herbert and Cooper, producing a bicycle called the Kangaroo. Hillman's new company soon established itself, and before the turn of the 20th century, Hillman was a millionaire. With wealth came the means to fulfil Hillman's next ambition, to become a car producer. Hillman had moved into Abingdon House in Stoke Aldermoor near Coventry and decided that a sensible plan would be to set up a car factory in its grounds. In 1907 Hillman-Coatalen was founded by William Hillman with the Breton Louis Coatalen as designer and chief engineer. They launched the 24HP Hillman-Coatalen, which was entered into that year's Tourist Trophy. The car was put out of the race by a crash, but it had made a splash. Coatalen left in 1909 to join Sunbeam and the company was re-registered as the Hillman Motor Car Company in 1910.

The first cars were large, featuring a 9.76-litre 6-cylinder engine or a 6.4-litre four. A smaller car, the 9 hp of 1913 with a 1357 cc side-valve four-cylinder engine, was the first to sell in significant numbers and was re-introduced after the First World War as the 11 hp, having grown to 1600 cc. The big seller was the 14 hp introduced in 1925, and the only model made until 1928. Following the fashion of the time a Straight Eight of 2.6 litres and Hillman's first use of overhead valves came in 1928 but soon gained a reputation for big-end problems.

== Alumni ==
William Hillman had six daughters and no sons. A daughter married John Black, managing director of Hillman, who left at the time of the Rootes takeover and went to Standard Motor Co. Another daughter married Maurice Wilks who left Hillman in the same period and eventually went to Rover Company.

== Hillman brand ==
=== Rootes Group ===
Hillman (marque)
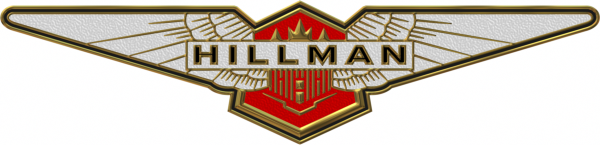
- Product type: Automobile
- Current owner: Stellantis
- Country: United Kingdom
- Discontinued: 1976; 50 years ago
- Markets: Automotive
- Previous owners: Hillman-Coatalen Motor Car Company (1907–31); Humber (1929–31); Rootes Group (1931–67); Chrysler Europe (1967–76); PSA Group (1967–2021)

In 1928, Hillman fell under the control of the Rootes brothers and then merged with Humber. The Rootes brothers obtained further backing from Prudential Assurance during 1931 and brought their holding up to 60 per cent of Humber. Then, in stages, Hillman was switched to manufacturing small cars and became the best known brand within the Rootes empire alongside Humber, Sunbeam and, in the Rootes Group's final decade, Singer.

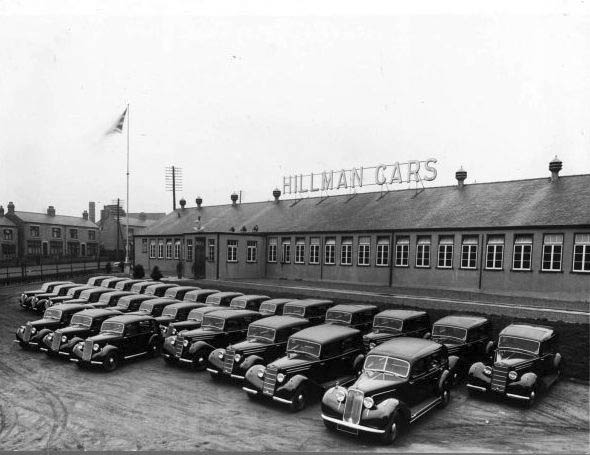
Hillman-Humber cars, 1936

The 1930s saw a return to side valves with a 6-cylinder Wizard first produced in April 1931 and, in 1932, inspired by the Rootes brothers, the first car to carry the Minx name. This had a 1185 cc four-cylinder engine and went through a series of updates in body style and construction until the end of the Second World War. In 1934 the Hillman Wizard "65" and "75" were replaced by the 2110 cc Hillman "16 hp" and 2810cc "20/70", which lasted until 1936 when a new body design in the form of the 2576 cc Hillman "Sixteen" and the 3181 cc "Hawk" and "80", all with side valve straight-six engines, were introduced. These later cars were also sold as Humbers.

After the war, the Minx was reintroduced with the same 1185 cc engine. It went through a series of models given Phase numbers and the Phase VIII of 1955 saw the arrival of an overhead-valve engine 1390cc, the Mk 8. The later 1956 Two Tone version of this model, the Mark 8A, was called the "Gay Look" and led to the advertising slogan "As Gay as a Mardi Gras". A smaller car, the Husky with van like body and using the old side-valve engine, was also new for 1954. The floor pan of this model was later to form the basis for the Sunbeam Alpine, Sunbeam also being part of the Rootes empire. A complete departure in 1963 was the Hillman Imp using a Coventry Climax derived all alloy, 875 cc rear engine and built in a brand new factory in Linwood, Scotland. The location was chosen under government influence to bring employment to a depressed area. A fastback version, the Californian, and an estate re-using the Husky name were also made. A new car called the Hunter was introduced in 1966 with, in 1967, a smaller-engined standard version using the old Minx name. These are frequently given their factory code of "Arrow", but this name was never officially used in marketing.

=== Chrysler ===
Chrysler assumed complete control of Rootes by 1967, and the first new Hillman model whose development was financed by the American giant was the Avenger of 1970.

=== Peugeot ===
The Avenger and Hunter ranges were badged as Chryslers from 1976 until 1979, when Chrysler sold its European division to Peugeot. At this point, Hunter production was shelved and the Avenger was rebadged as a Talbot until it was finally withdrawn from sale at the end of 1981.

Hillman's Ryton factory, which had assembled various Peugeot models for the European market, closed in 2007. The French company still owns the rights to the Hillman name.

== Car models ==
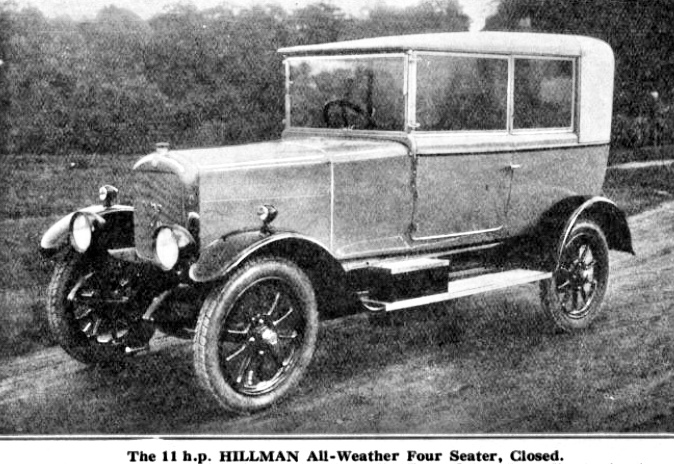
Hillman 11 hp (1915-1926)

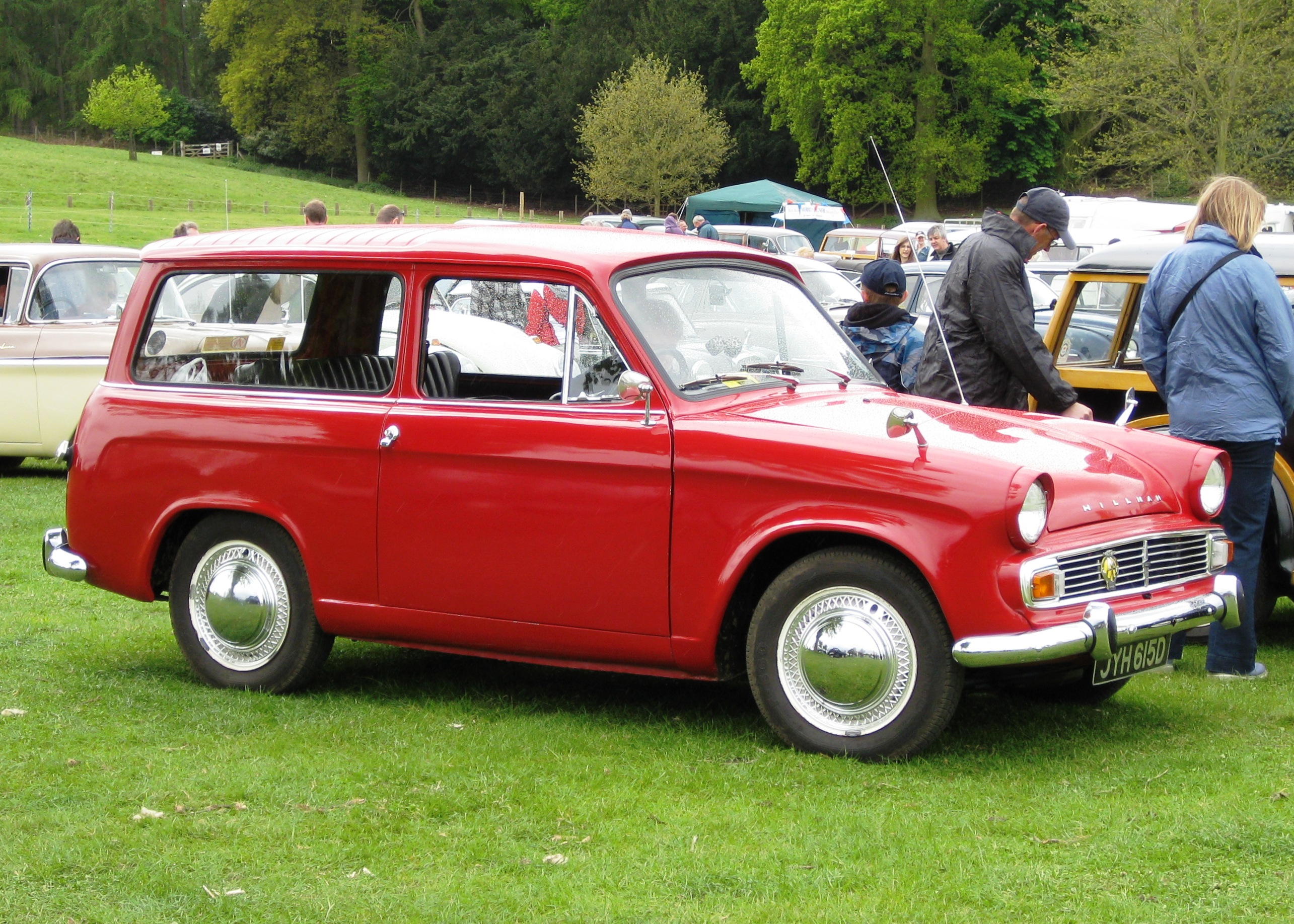
Husky 1966, 1390 cc 4-cylinder

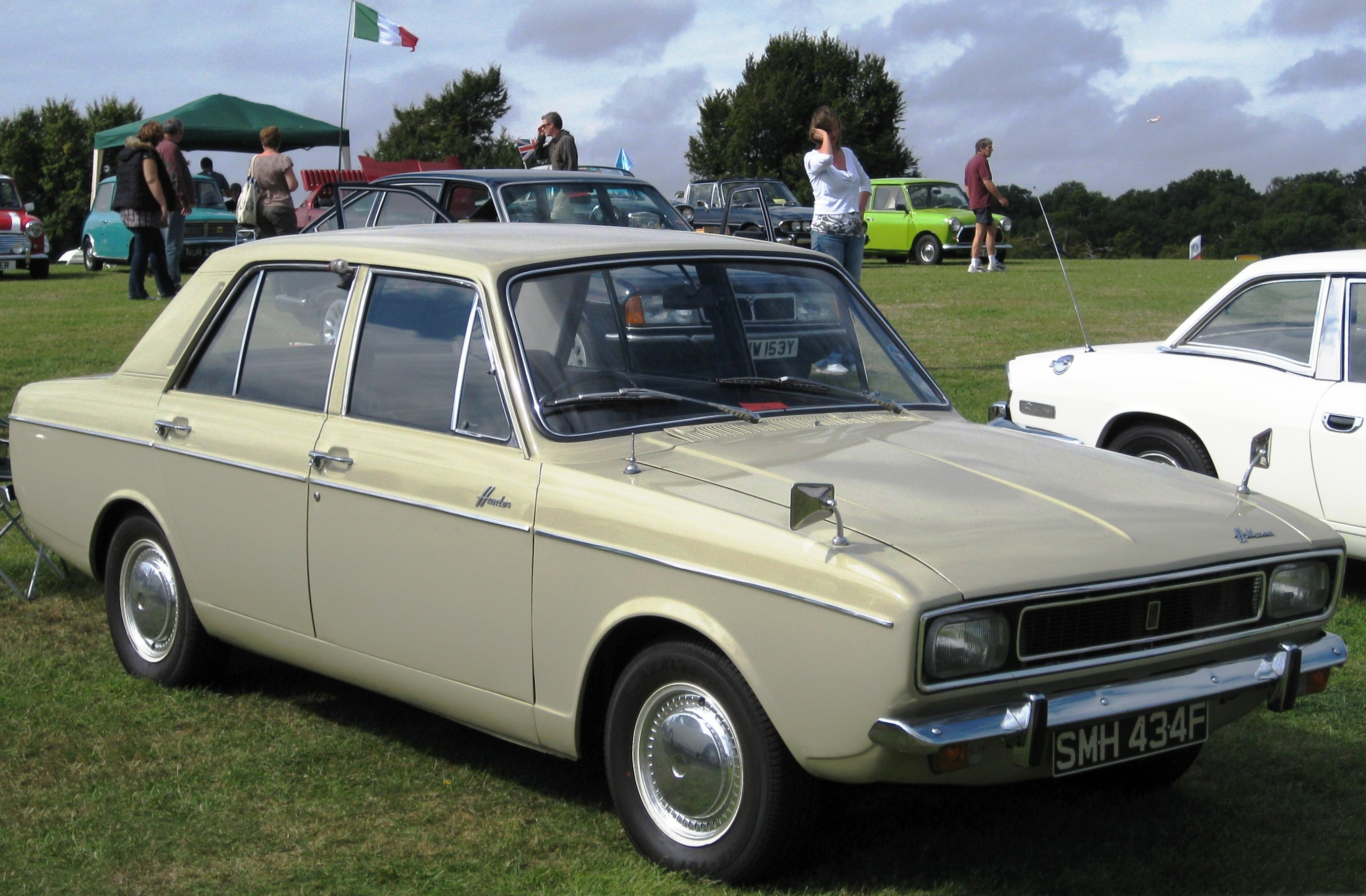
Hunter 1967, 1725 cc 4-cylinder

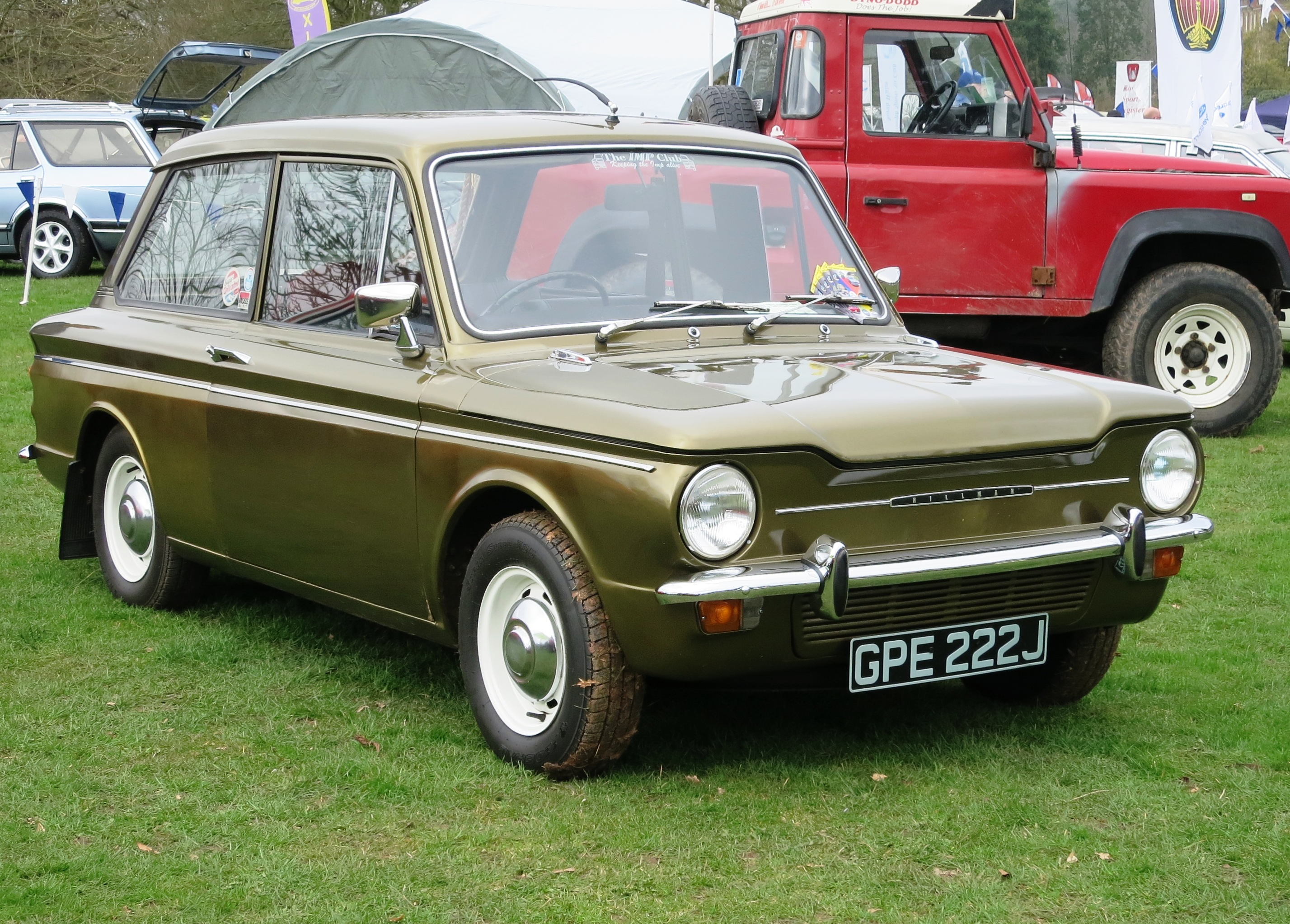
Imp 1971, 875 cc 4-cylinder

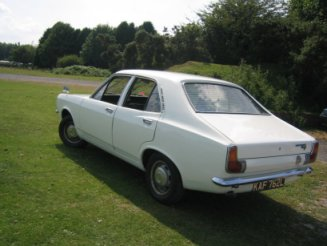
Avenger 1972, 1248 cc 4-cylinder

Cars introduced after 1930 were a new range to the specification of the Rootes brothers

- Hillman 40 hp 1907–1911 (also known as 40/60)
- Hillman 25 hp 1909–1913 (also known as 25/40)
- Hillman 12/15 1908–1913
- Hillman 9 hp 1913–1915
- Hillman 10 hp 1910
- Hillman 13/25 1914
- Hillman 11 hp 1915–1926
- Hillman 10 hp Super Sports 1920–1922
- Hillman 14 1925–1930

Cars to the specification of the Rootes brothers

- Hillman 20 range:

Straight Eight 1929
Vortic 1930
Wizard 75 1931–1933
Twenty 70 1934–1935
Hawk 1936–1937
Long wheelbase Hillman 20s:

Seven-Seater LWB 1934–1935
Hillman 80 LWB 1936–1938

- Hillman 16 range:

Wizard 65 1931–1933
Sixteen 1934–1937

- Hillman Minx 1932–1970 (various models)
- Hillman 14 1938–1940
- Hillman Husky 1954–1963
- Hillman Super Minx 1961–1967
- Hillman Imp 1963–1976
- Hillman Gazelle 1966–1967 (Australia)
- Hillman Hunter 1966–1979
- Hillman Arrow 1967–1968 (Australia)
- Hillman Avenger 1970–1981
- Hillman Hustler 1971–1972 (Australia)

== See also ==
- List of car manufacturers of the United Kingdom
