= William Hillman =

British businessman (1848–1921)

William Hillman (13 November 1848 – 4 February 1921) was a British bicycle and automobile manufacturer. In partnership with Louis Coatalen he founded the Hillman-Coatalen Company in 1907, later the Hillman Motor Company after Coatalen's defection to Sunbeam in 1909.

== Early life ==
Hillman was born on 13 November 1848 in Stratford, Essex (other sources say 30 December 1847 in Lewisham, Kent), where his father, also called William, was a shoemaker; his mother was Sarah Stitchbury. He became an apprentice in the engineering works of John Penn & Co. at Greenwich together with his friend James Starley, who became known as "the father of the cycle industry". Hillman and Starley moved to the expanding industrial area of the English Midlands, where they were employed by the Coventry Sewing Machine Company. Sales of sewing machines had declined, and to compensate the company had become the first British manufacturers of bicycles, using designs based on French "boneshakers". The Franco-Prussian War of 1870 halted bicycle manufacture in France and led to a boom in British production. Hillman set up his own bicycle manufacturing company in 1875, Auto Machinery, in partnership with W. H. Herbert, who provided the capital.

== Family life ==
In 1873 Hillman married Fanny Moreton Brockas, the daughter of a farmer, Henry Brockas. They had five daughters, three of whom married people with connections in the British car industry.

- Mary Beatrice Hillman was born in 1881 and was a violinist.
- Evelyn Hillman 1883-1996 married Percy Rowland Hill a watchmaker.
- Dorothy Annie Hillman 1885-1975 married Thomas Sidney Dick, the uncle of Alick Dick of the Standard Motor Company
- Margaret Verena Hillman 1887-1965 married John Black who went on to be chairman of Standard-Triumph.
- Edith Kathleen Hillman 1891-1972 married Spencer Wilks of the Rover Car Company.

William Hillman died at his home, Keresley Hall, Coventry, on 4 February 1921 and he is buried in Keresley Churchyard.

== Career ==
As well as bicycles Hillman's company made roller-skates, sewing machines, and ball and roller bearings, of which it pioneered the mass production; Hillman was soon operating four factories in Coventry, and by 1896 a fifth in Nuremberg, Germany.

In around 1896 the bicycle building interests were separated from the rest of the company and employed 600 people building 33.000 cycles a year.

In 1905 he decided to move into motor vehicle manufacture and in 1907 with Louis Coatalen from Humber founded the Hillman-Coatalen Company.

His success made him a millionaire, and allowed him to move to Abingdon House, an "impressive home" in Stoke Aldermoor, now a suburb of Coventry.
