= Sunbeam Tiger (1925) =

Overview
- Manufacturer: Sunbeam of Wolverhampton
- Production: two
- Designer: Louis Coatalen

Body and chassis
- Body style: Open-wheel racing car

Powertrain
- Engine: 3976cc, 300 hp supercharged V12 Sunbeam, formed by mounting two 2 litre engines onto a common crankcase.
- Transmission: 4-speed pre-selector

The Sunbeam Tiger is a racing car, built by Sunbeam of Wolverhampton during the 1920s. It was the last car to be competitive both as a land speed record holder, and as a circuit-racing car.

== Design and engine ==
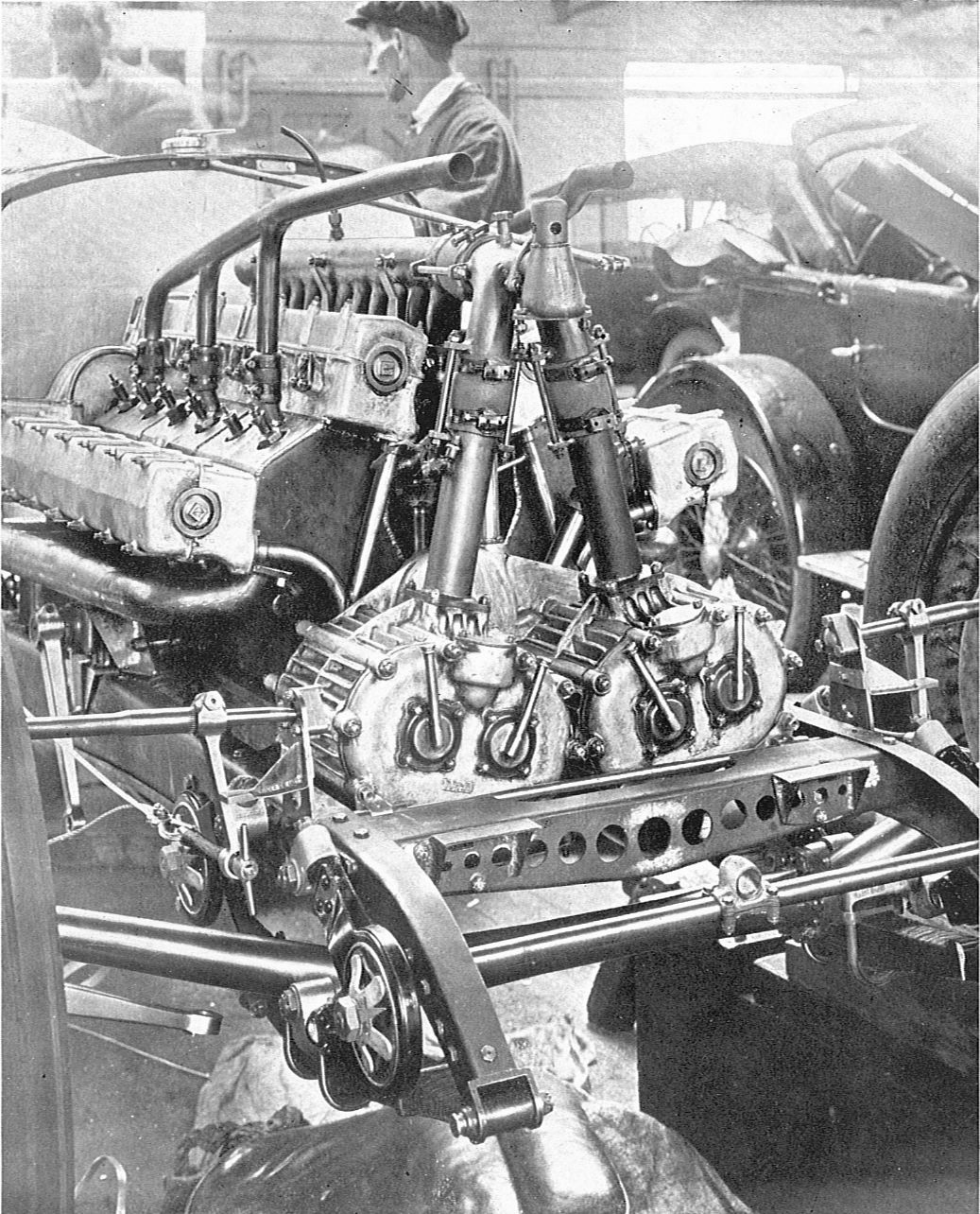
Engine, showing the dual superchargers

The chassis and bodywork of the Sunbeam were conventional for racing cars of their time.

The car's novelty lay with its engine. Sunbeam's 1925 Grand Prix engine had been a successful 2-litre straight-6 twin-overhead-cam. This car was to use a pair of the same block and head arrangements, mated to a single 75° vee crankcase to produce a 3,976 cc (242.6 cu in) V12, capacity 67 mm × 94 mm (2.64 in × 3.70 in). Supercharging brought the power up to 306 hp (228 kW).

== Land Speed Records ==
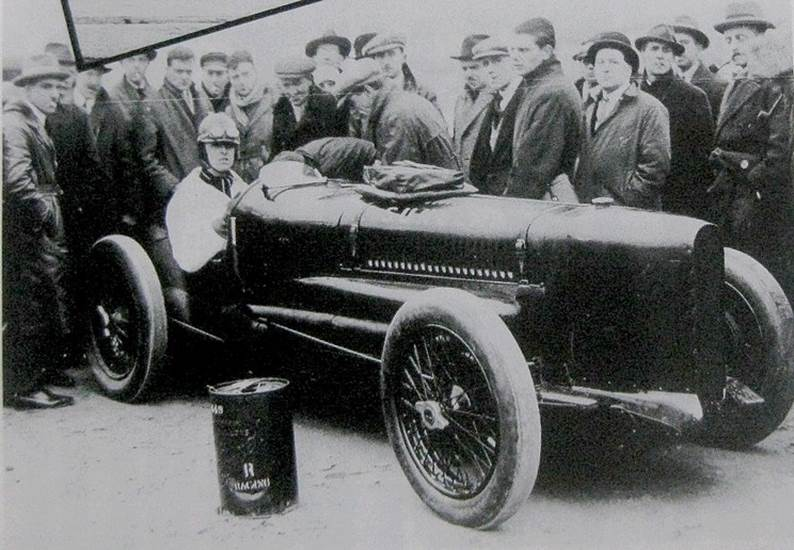
The car in 1926, at Southport

Henry Segrave was so keen to test the new car and engine that he took it to Brooklands in September 1925, still unpainted. A half-mile speed of 145 mph (233 km/h) was recorded. Minor works, including the bright red paint still notable today, were done over the winter.

Spring 1926 saw Segrave on the wide, flat beach at Southport. On 16 March 1926, with little fuss and few spectators, he and the bright-red car now named Ladybird set a new land speed record at 152.33 mph (245.15 km/h). The Sunbeam was the smallest capacity internal combustion-engined car ever to hold the Land Speed Record.

== Racing ==
After the land speed record, the car returned to Grand Prix racing at Brooklands, Boulogne and San Sebastian.

At the time of the land speed record attempt, the car was fitted with a narrow inlet cowling over the radiator, similar to that of the Sunbeam 350HP. For racing, a flat open radiator grille was used. The narrow cowling has re-appeared in preservation.

== Tigress ==
One sister car to Tiger was built and named Tigress.

It survives today, fitted with a Napier Lion engine and racing in British Vintage events as the "Sunbeam-Napier".

== Today ==
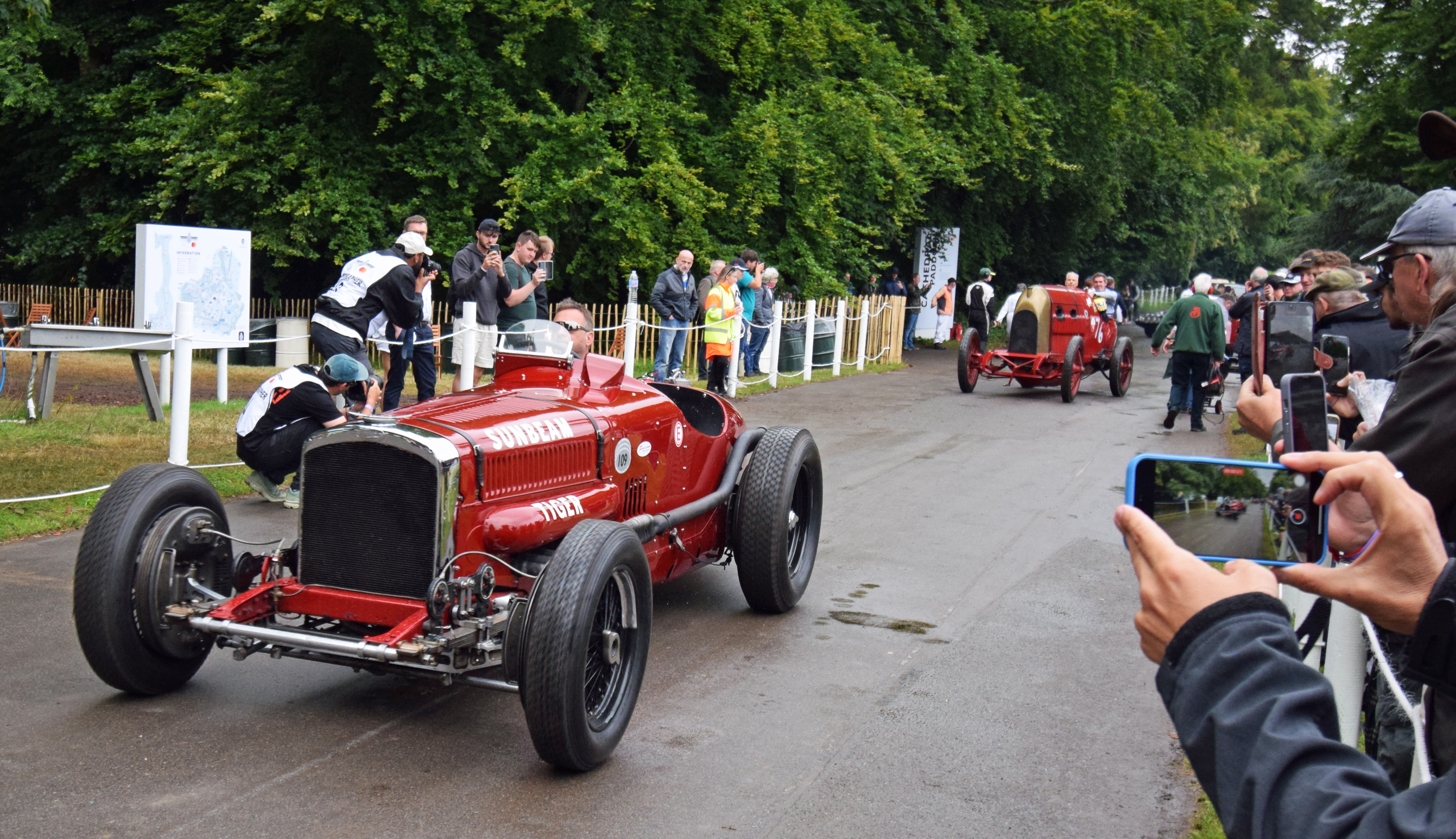
The Tiger at Goodwood Festival of Speed in 2024.

Tiger spent a period in preservation in Utah, where the car had been restored with the streamlined radiator cowling fitted for record-breaking. As of 2006, the engine was reportedly rebuilt after suffering foreign object damage whilst vintage racing, hence the static display in LSR trim.

In recent years (2023 onwards), Tiger is in the ownership of the Indian businessman, Vijay Mallya. The car is competing in historic motorsport events in the U.K. with the Vintage Sports Car Club and at Goodwood.

In 1990, the then 65-year-old Tiger re-created its record attempt, this time at RAF Elvington, and succeeded in beating it at 159 mph (256 km/h).

== The 'Tiger' name ==
In 1964 and 1972 the "Tiger" name was revived within the marque, first for a V8 version of the Sunbeam Alpine, the Sunbeam Tiger. Later it appeared on the more mundane Hillman Avenger Tiger, which resembled a tiger by being orange with black stripes, if little else.

=== Photographs ===
External images
- Tiger on static display, with LSR nose
- Tiger on the track recently, Mark Ballard
- Tiger in the workshop, with bonnet removed, Mark Ballard
