= Garrad =

Garrad is an English-language surname. Notable people with the surname include:

- Bob Garrad (born 1960), British speedway rider
- Ian Garrad, American businessman
