= Ian Garrad =

American sales manager

Ian Garrad was the United States West Coast sales manager for Rootes Group, parent company of Sunbeam. He was instrumental in the design and eventual production of the Sunbeam Tiger.

== Sunbeam Tiger ==
Ian started his career as a factory representative in Toronto, Canada in 1951. Ten years later, he became the manager of the west coast sales unit for the Rootes Group, in Los Angeles. It was during this time that he discovered that while the Sunbeam Alpine fared well in SCCA events, drivers were begging for more power. He produced two prototypes for what would become the Sunbeam Tiger, with a degree of risk to his career. The best of the two prototypes were shipped back to England with the goal of persuading management to enter production; a new car with the Tiger name consisting of the diminutive Alpine body with a large Ford V8 engine. The model was short lived due to labor problems in England, such that Chrysler was brought in as a minority partner in 1965. Chrysler showed no interest in producing a sports car using a competitor's engine, nor the man that bought it to market. Ian moved on to other ventures but was active with Tiger Clubs, until his death in 1986.
