= Sunbeam Alpine =

Two seat automobile built 1953–1975

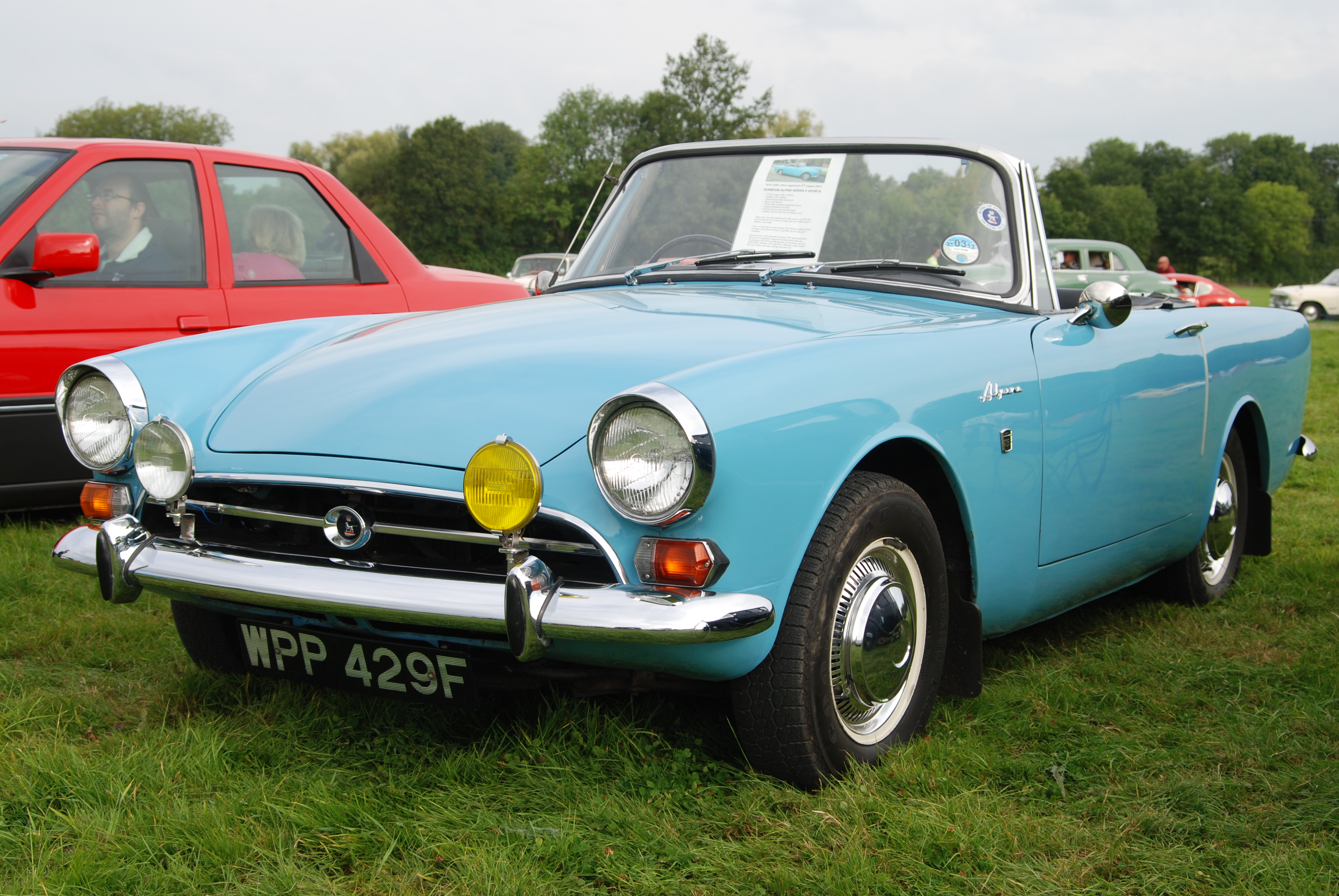

Overview
- Manufacturer: Rootes Group
- Production: 1953–1975
- Assembly: United Kingdom: Ryton-on-Dunsmore, Warwickshire, England
- Designer: Roy Axe

Body and chassis
- Class: Sports car
- Body style: Roadster (1953–1955 and 1959–1968); Fastback coupé (1969–1975)
- Layout: FR layout

The Sunbeam Alpine is a two-seater sports roadster/drophead coupé that was produced by the Rootes Group from 1953 to 1955, and then 1959 to 1968. The name was then used on a two-door fastback coupé from 1969 to 1975. The original Alpine was launched in 1953 as the first vehicle from Sunbeam-Talbot to bear the Sunbeam name alone since Rootes Group bought Clément-Talbot, and later the moribund Sunbeam from its receiver in 1935.

== Alpine Mark I and III ==
Sunbeam Alpine Mark I & III
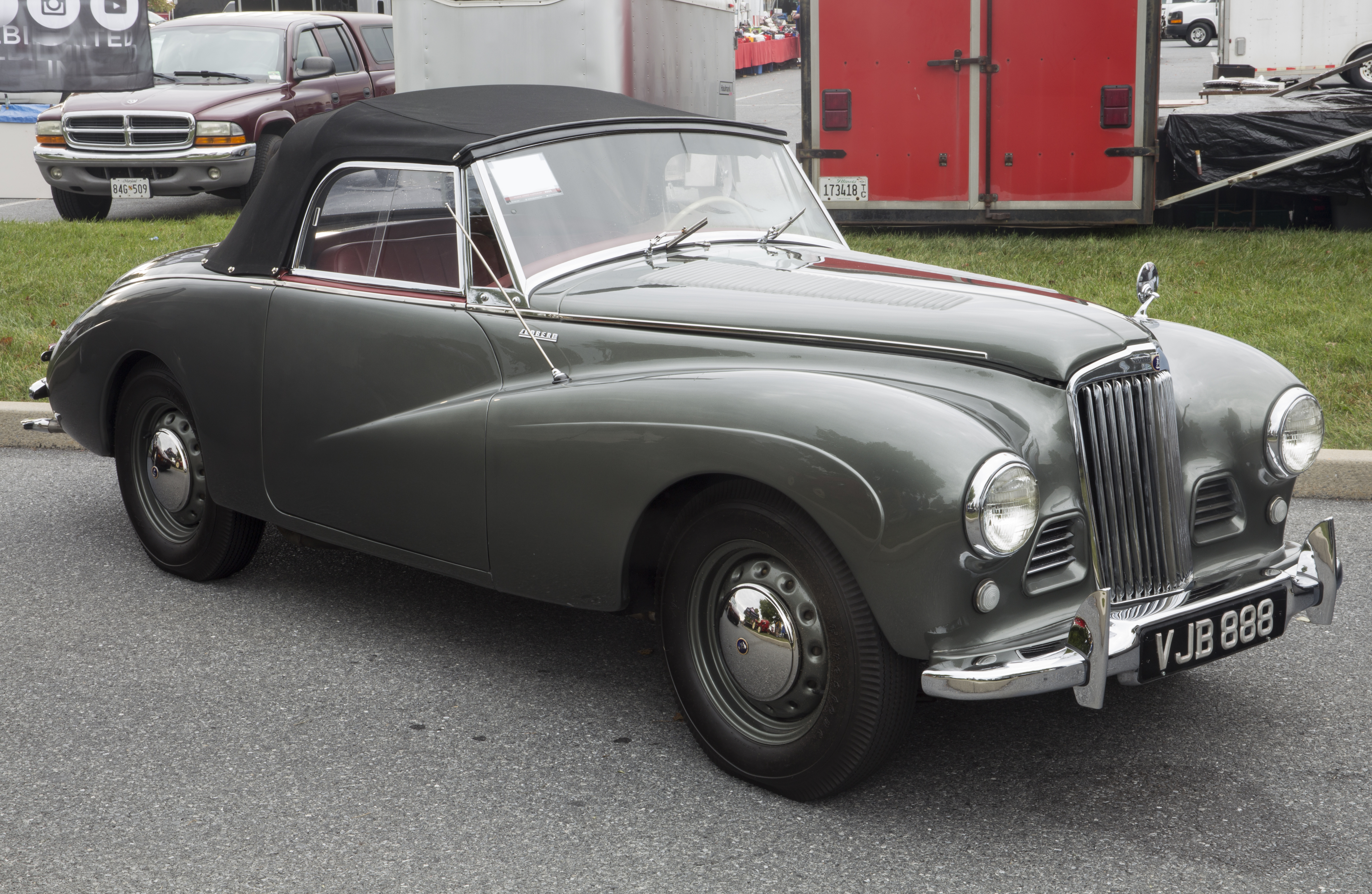
- Alpine Mark I

Overview
- Production: 1953–1955; 1,582 made
- Assembly: United Kingdom; Australia

Body and chassis
- Body style: 2-door roadster
- Related: Sunbeam-Talbot 90

Powertrain
- Engine: 2267 cc (2.3 L) I4

Dimensions
- Wheelbase: 97.5 in (2,476 mm)
- Length: 168.5 in (4,280 mm)
- Width: 62.5 in (1,588 mm)

Chronology
- Successor: Series Alpine

The Alpine was derived from the Sunbeam-Talbot 90 Saloon, and has become colloquially known as the "Talbot" Alpine. It was a two-seater sports roadster initially developed for a one-off rally car by Bournemouth Sunbeam-Talbot dealer George Hartwell. It had its beginnings as a 1952 Sunbeam-Talbot drophead coupé. Announced in March 1953 it received its name following Sunbeam-Talbot saloons successes in the Alpine Rally during the early 1950s. On its first competitive outing, the July 1953 Coupe des Alpes, the new car won the Coupe des Dames (Sheila van Damm) and, without loss of any marks, four Coupes des Alpes driven by Stirling Moss, John Fitch, G Murray-Frame and Sheila van Damm.

The car has a four-cylinder 2,267 cc (138.3 cu in) engine from the saloon, but with a raised compression ratio. However, since it was developed from the saloon platform, it suffered from rigidity compromises despite extra side members in the chassis. The gearbox ratios were changed, and from 1954 an overdrive unit became standard. The gear-change lever was column-mounted. A true open 2-seater, there were no external door handles or wind-up windows.

The Alpine Mark I and Mark III (no Mark II was made) were hand-built at the Rootes Group owned Thrupp & Maberly coachbuilders at Cricklewood London, from 1953 to 1955, and remained in production for only two years. Of the 1582 automobiles produced, 961 were exported to the US and Canada, 445 stayed in the UK, and 175 went to other world markets. In 2000 it was estimated that perhaps as few as 200 had survived.

The Sunbeam Alpine Mk 1 Special was based on the 2267 cc Mk 1 Sunbeam Talbot motor, with alloy rocker cover and Siamese exhaust ports (cylinders 2 and 3). These motors developed a reputed 97.5 bhp at 4,500 rpm, mainly by raising the compression ratio to 8.0:1 and incorporating a special induction manifold with a twin choke Solex 40 P.I.I carburettor. The motors of the Sunbeam Alpine Team Cars (MKV 21–26) were configured the same as the Sunbeam Alpine Mk I Special, with further tuning by ERA to raise power to 106 bhp.

Very few of these cars are ever seen on the big screen. However, a sapphire blue Alpine featured prominently in the 1955 Alfred Hitchcock film To Catch a Thief starring Cary Grant and Grace Kelly. More recently, the American PBS show History Detectives tried to verify that an Alpine roadster owned by a private individual was the actual car used in that movie. Although the Technicolor process could "hide" the car's true colour, and knowing that the car was shipped back from Monaco to the US for use in front of a rear projection effect, the car shown on the programme was ultimately proven not to be the film car upon comparison of the vehicle identification numbers. A Mk I model also appears in the 1957 British horror film Night of the Demon. A reference to the Mark I is also made in Muriel Spark's 1957 debut novel, The Comforters, where the supercharged Sunbeam Alpine prompts a race with the protagonists' MG.

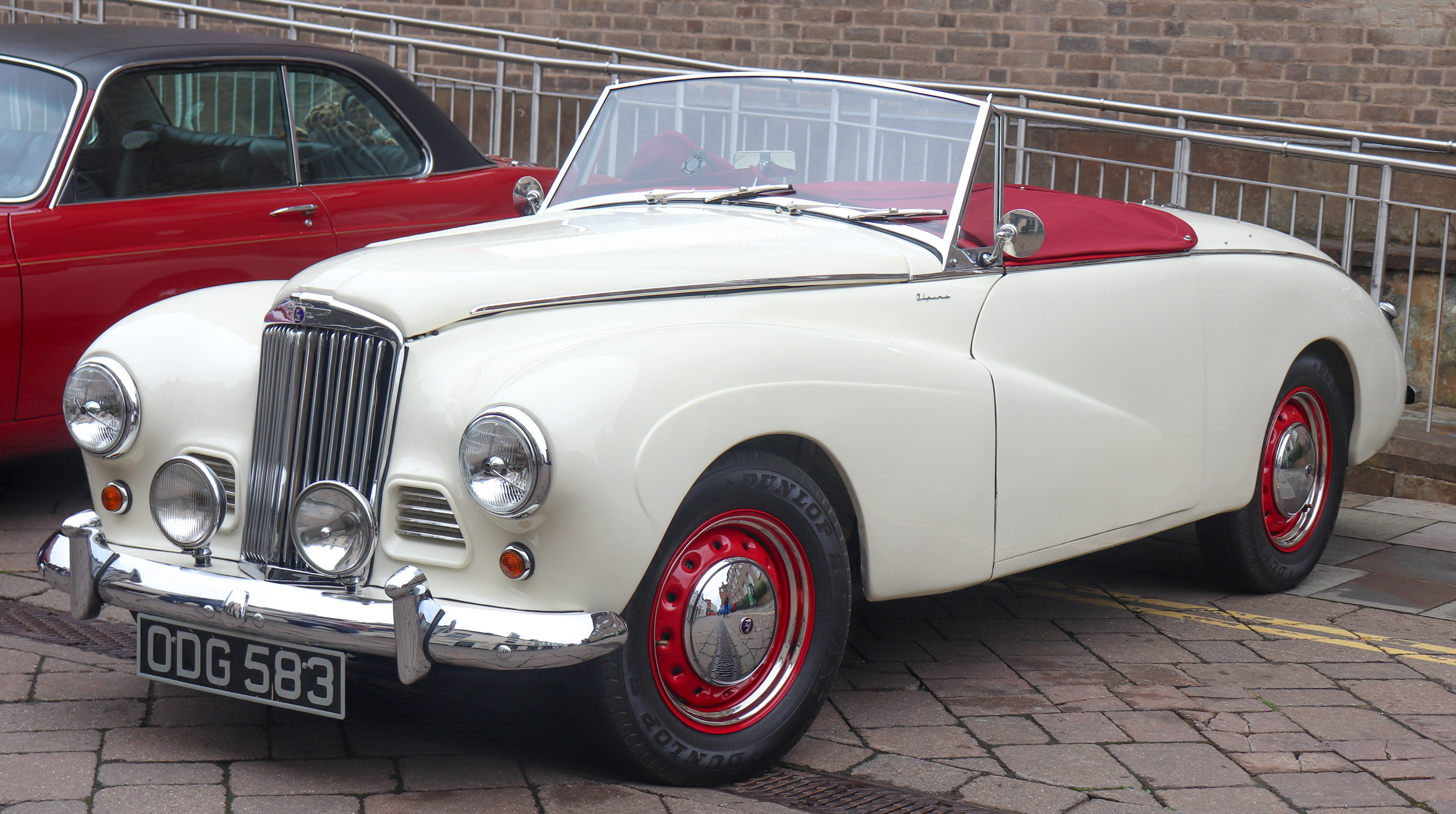
Alpine Mk III

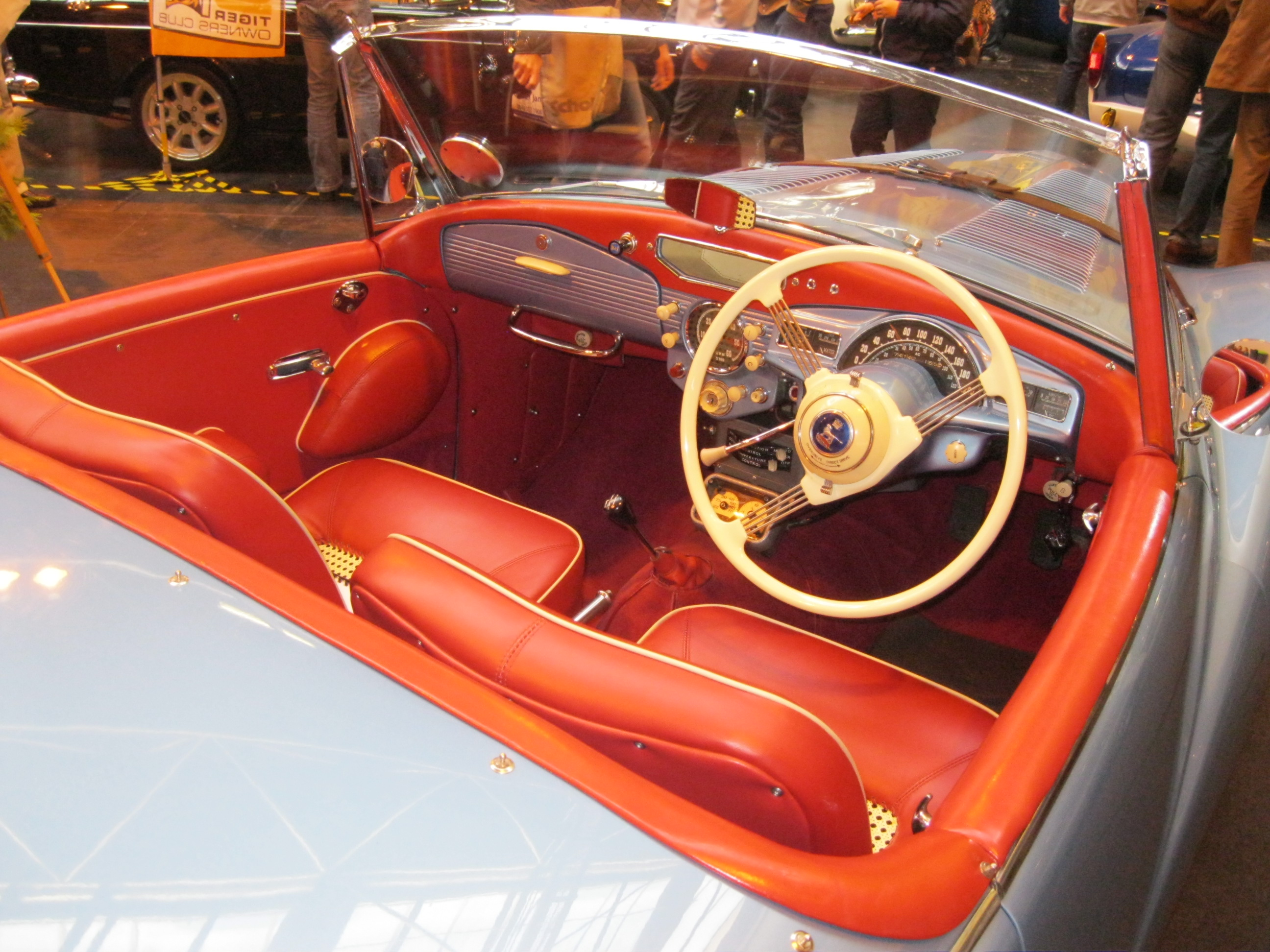
Open two-seater, without wind-up windows

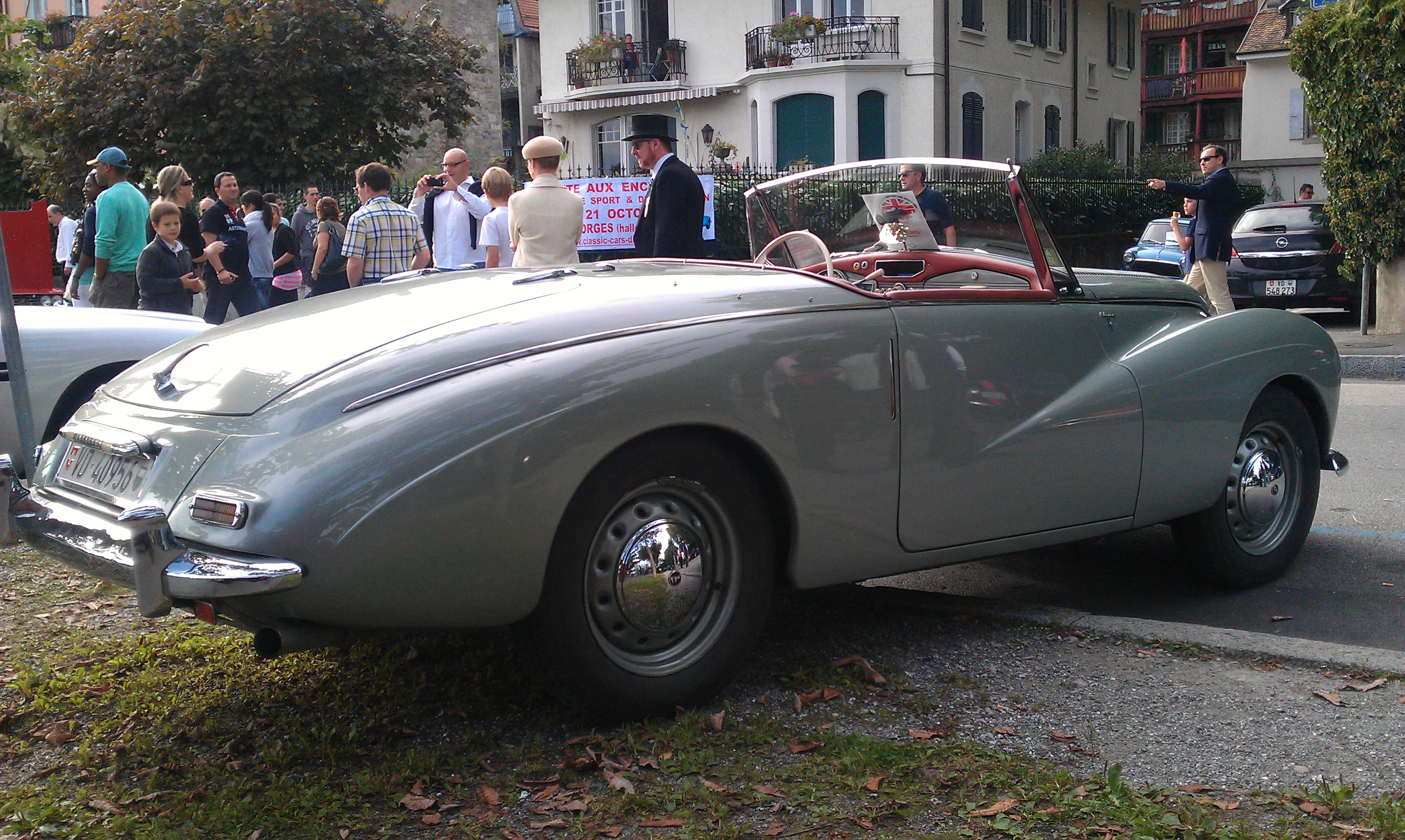
1954

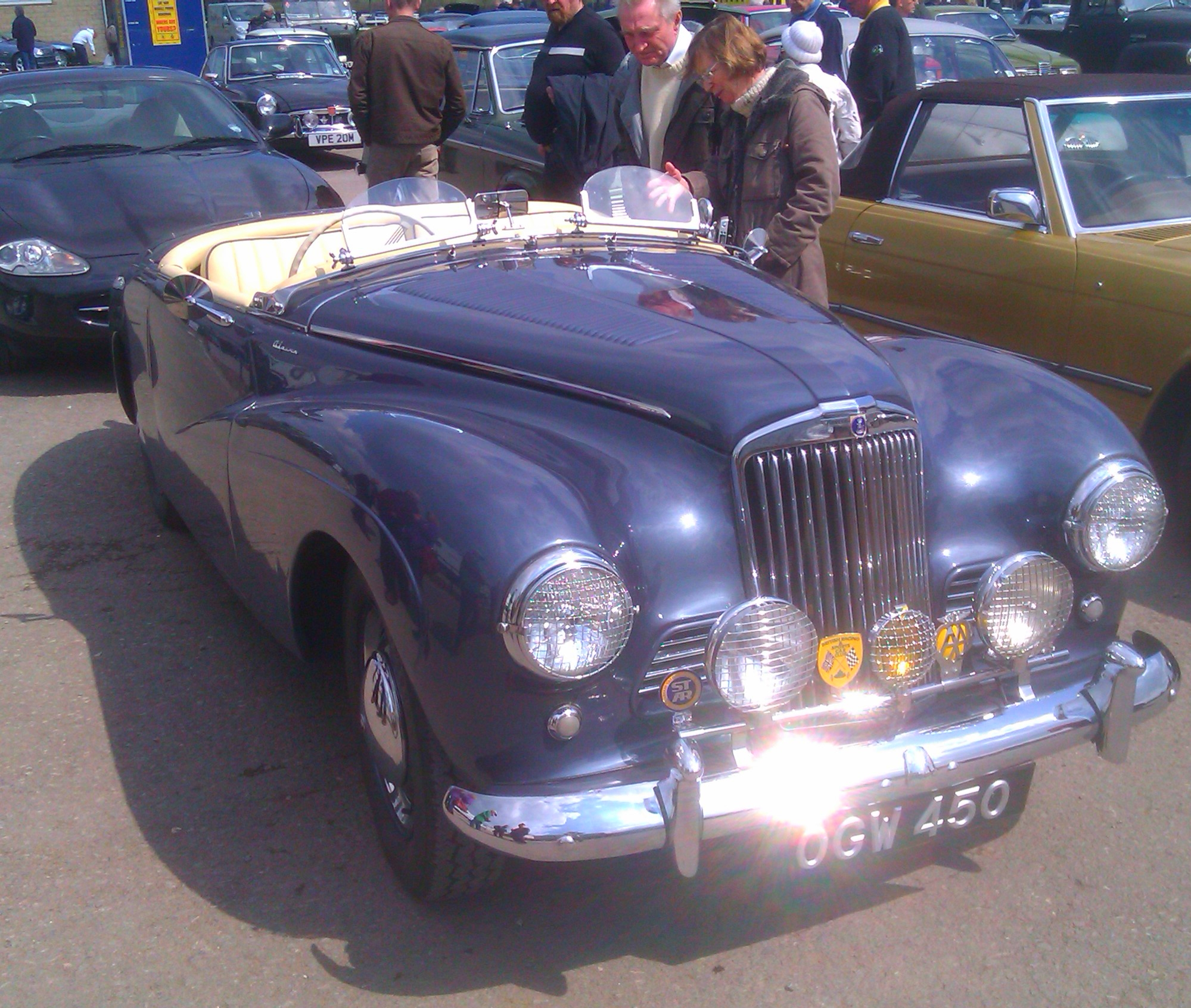
Alpine with factory aero-screens
registered November 1953

== Alpine Series I to V ==
Sunbeam Alpine Series I to V
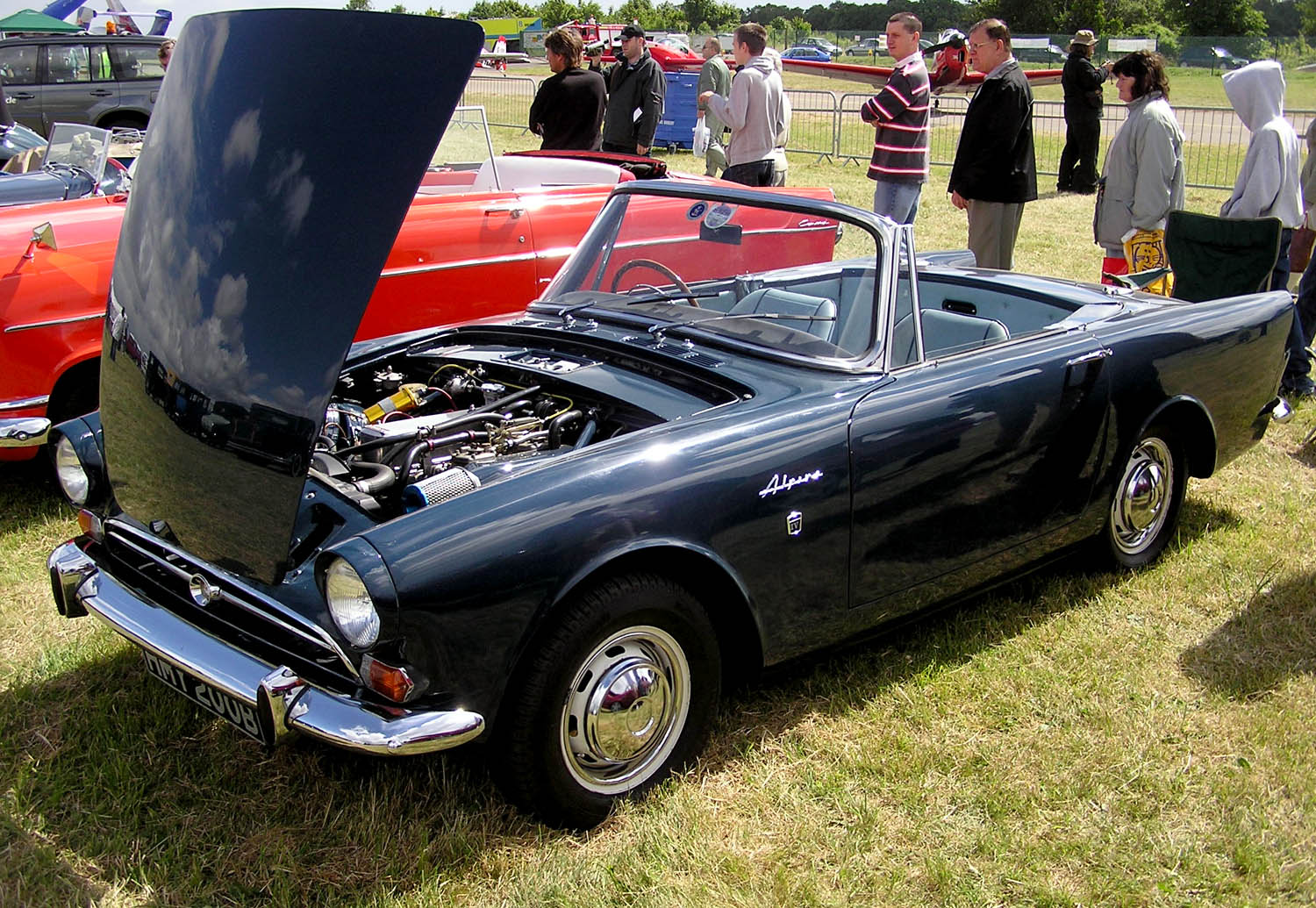
- Sunbeam Alpine Series IV

Overview
- Production: 1959–1968; 69,251 made

Body and chassis
- Body style: 2-door roadster
- Related: Sunbeam Tiger

Powertrain
- Engine: Series I: 91.2 cu in (1.5 L) I4; Series II, III & IV: 1592 cc (1.6 L) I4; Series V: 1725 cc (1.7 L) I4

Dimensions
- Wheelbase: 86 in (2,184 mm)
- Length: 155 in (3,937 mm)
- Width: 61 in (1,549 mm)
- Height: 51 in (1,295 mm)

The first open 2-seater Alpines were based on the Hillman 14 and its successor the Humber Hawk. Rootes replaced them with a softer new smaller 2-seater sports convertible coupé based on the current Hillman Minx and its variants. Kenneth Howes and Jeff Crompton were tasked with doing a complete redesign in 1956, with the goal of producing a dedicated sports car aimed principally at the US market. Howes did some 80 percent of the overall design. He had been on the Studebaker team at Loewy Studios and then at Ford in Detroit before joining Rootes.

The Alpine was produced in four subsequent revisions until 1968. Total production numbered around 70,000. Production stopped shortly after the Chrysler takeover of the Rootes Group.

=== Series I (1959–1960) ===
The "Series" Alpine started production in 1959.

The Series I was built on a modified floorpan from the Hillman Husky estate car with a 1,494 cc (91.2 cu in) engine and made extensive use of components from other Rootes Group vehicles. The running gear came mainly from the Sunbeam Rapier, but with front disc brakes replacing the saloon car's drums. An overdrive unit and wire wheels were optional. The suspension was independent at the front using coil springs and at the rear had a live axle and semi-elliptic springing. The Girling-manufactured brakes used 9.5 in (241 mm) discs at the front and 9 in (229 mm) drums at the rear. It had dual downdraft carburetors, a soft top that could be hidden by special integral covers and the first available wind-up side windows offered in a British sports car of that time.

Coupé versions of the post-1959 version were built by Thomas Harrington Ltd. After the Le Mans Index of Efficiency success of 1961, Harrington sold replicas as the "Harrington Le Mans", using a fastback body and an engine tuned to 104 hp (78 kW). Unlike the Le Mans racers, these cars had a more integrated rear roofline and were without the tail fins of the roadsters. Until 1962 the car was assembled for Rootes by Armstrong Siddeley.

An open car with overdrive was tested by the British magazine The Motor in 1959. It had a top speed of 99.5 mph (160.1 km/h) and could accelerate from 0–60 mph (97 km/h) in 13.6 seconds. A fuel consumption of 31.4 miles per imperial gallon (9.0 L/100 km; 26.1 mpg_{‑US}) was recorded. The test car cost £1031 including taxes.

11,904 examples of the series I were produced. One of the original prototypes still survives and was raced by British Touring car champion Bernard Unett.

=== Series II (1960–1963) ===
The Series II of 1960 featured an enlarged 1,592 cc (97.1 cu in) engine producing 80 bhp and revised rear suspension, but there were few other changes. When it was replaced in 1963, 19,956 had been made.

A Series II with hardtop and overdrive was tested by The Motor magazine in 1960, which recorded a top speed of 98.6 mph (158.7 km/h), acceleration from 0–60 mph (97 km/h) in 13.6 seconds and a fuel consumption of 31.0 miles per imperial gallon (9.1 L/100 km; 25.8 mpg_{‑US}). The test car cost £1,110 including taxes.

=== Series III (1963–1964) ===
The Series III was produced in two versions:

- GT with removable hardtop only (no soft-top)
- ST with soft-top (stored behind the small rear seat)

Other distinguishing features were:

- High fins
- Quarter-height window for guide post
- Roll-up window rear edge angular
- Vertical spare tyre
- Tanks in fins
- All chrome bumper guards
- Later "flat" rear window hard top
- Series 3 badge on front wing and Rootes Group badge centered low on the bonnet.
- Serial number begins with B 92___

The rarest production Alpine, the Series III was produced from March, 1963 to January, 1964 for a total of 5,863 units. It was a transitional model, incorporating many of the modifications of the later low fin cars such as roomier boot, later hard top (common with Tiger), tube type rear shocks, improved micro cell seats, and a vacuum brake booster. The 1592 cc engine was de-tuned in the GT for smoothness.

=== Series IV (1964–1965) ===
There was no longer a lower-output engine option; the convertible and hardtop versions shared the same 82 bhp engine with single Solex carburettor. A new rear styling was introduced with the fins largely removed. An automatic transmission with floor-mounted control became an option, but was unpopular. From autumn 1964 a new manual gearbox with synchromesh on first gear was adopted in line with its use in other Rootes cars. A total of 12,406 were made.

=== Series V (1965–1968) ===
The final version had a new five-bearing 1,725 cc (105.3 cu in) engine with twin Zenith-Stromberg semi-downdraught carburettors producing 93 bhp. There was no longer an automatic transmission option. 19,122 were made. In some export markets, 100 PS (99 bhp) SAE were claimed.

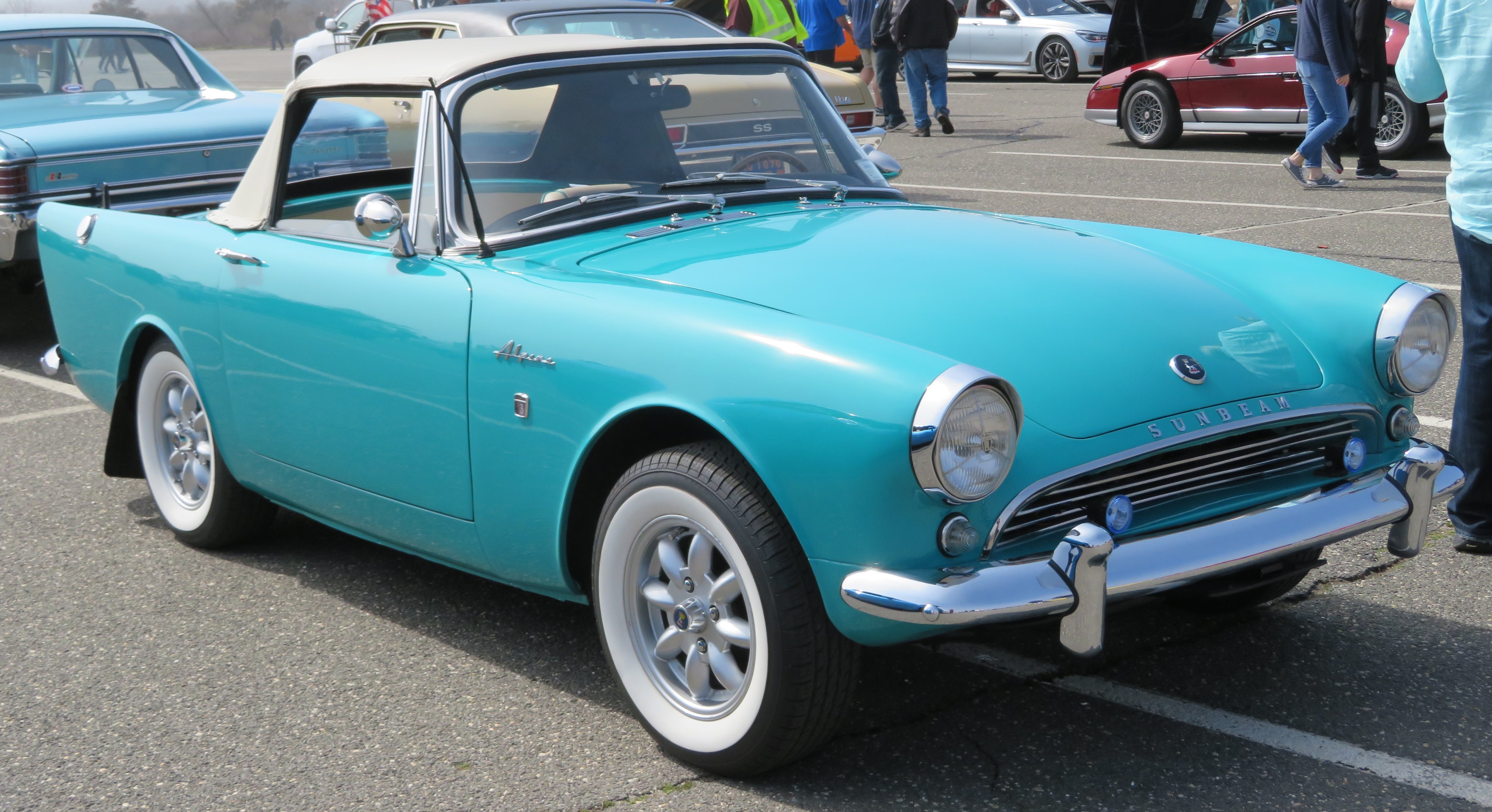
Sunbeam Alpine Series III

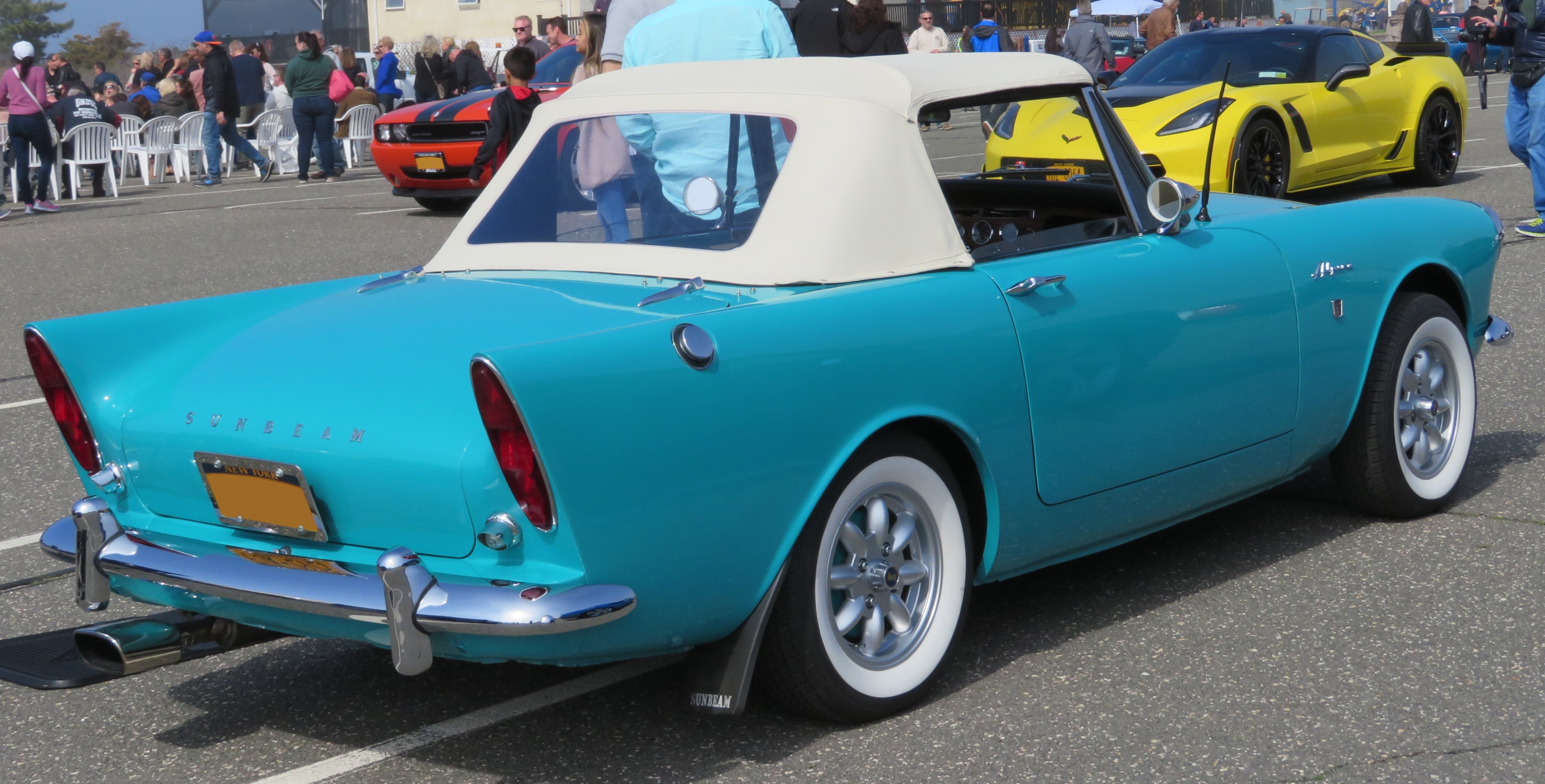
Sunbeam Alpine Series III

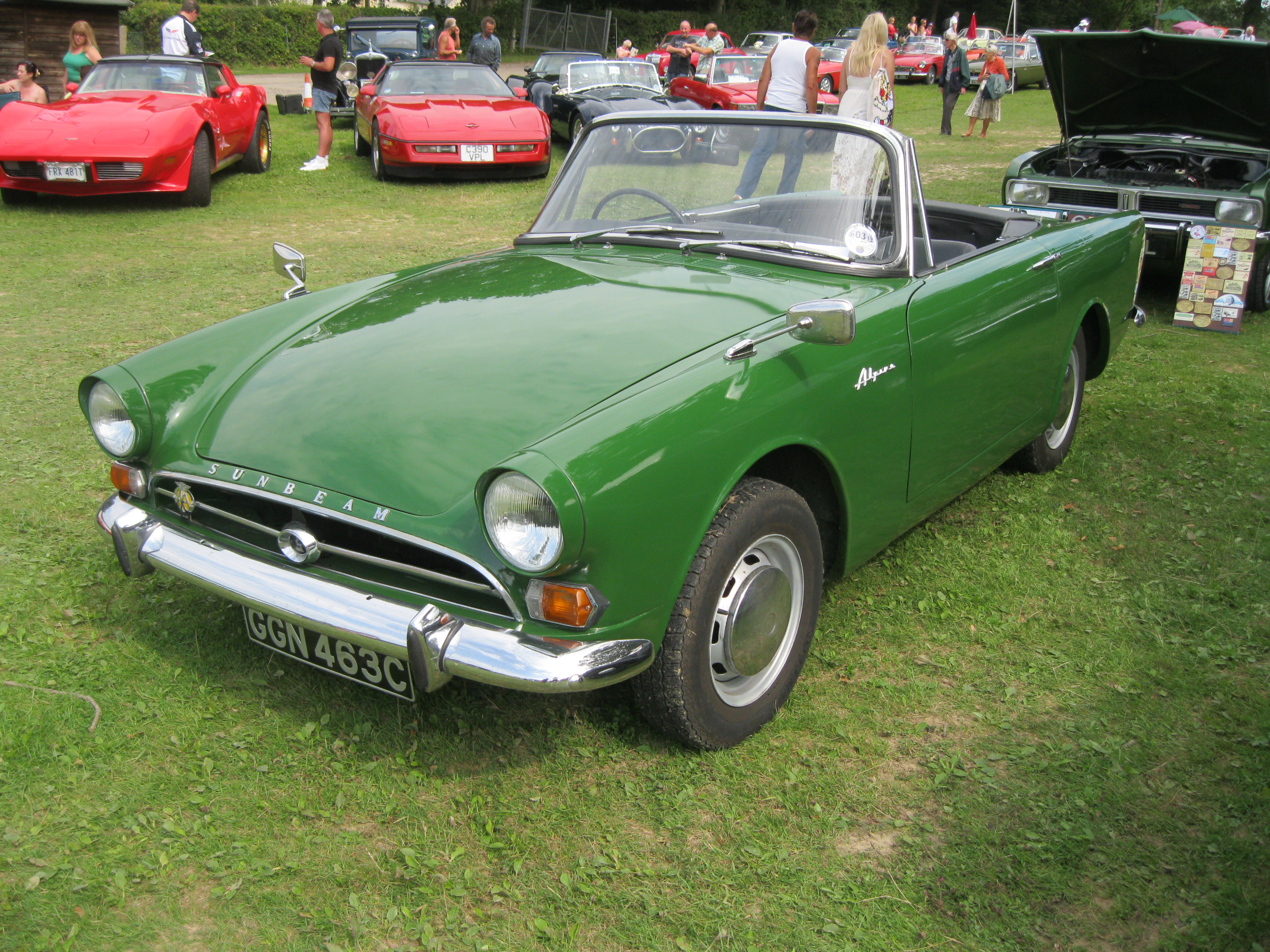
Sunbeam Alpine Series IV

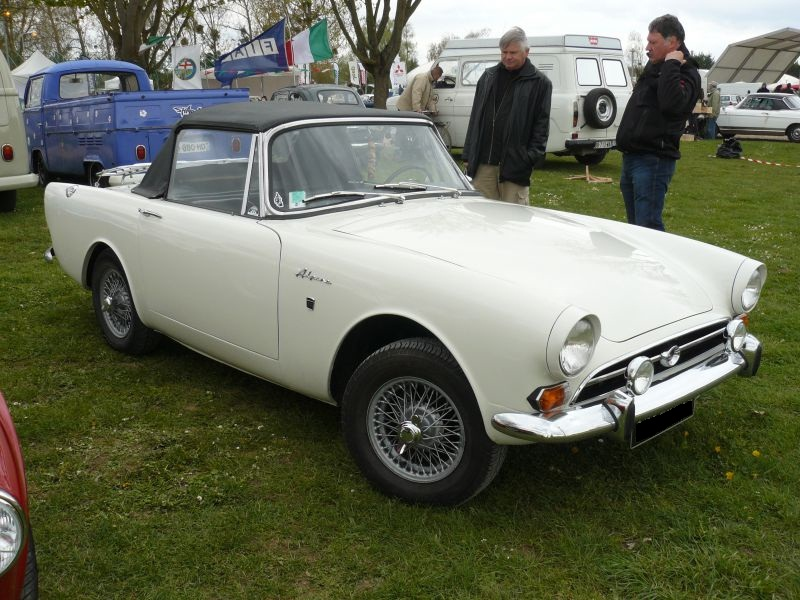
1967 Sunbeam Alpine Series V

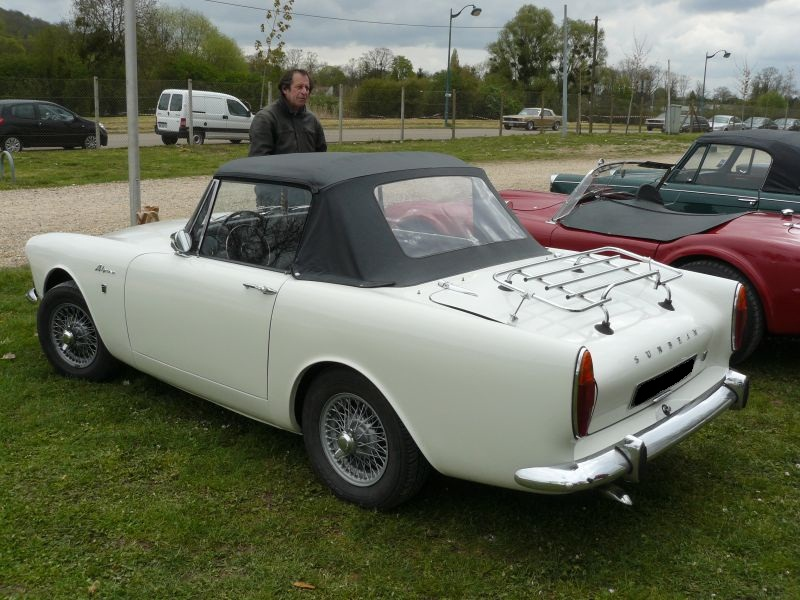
1967 Sunbeam Alpine Series V

A muscle-car variant of the later versions was also built, the Sunbeam Tiger.

=== Competition ===
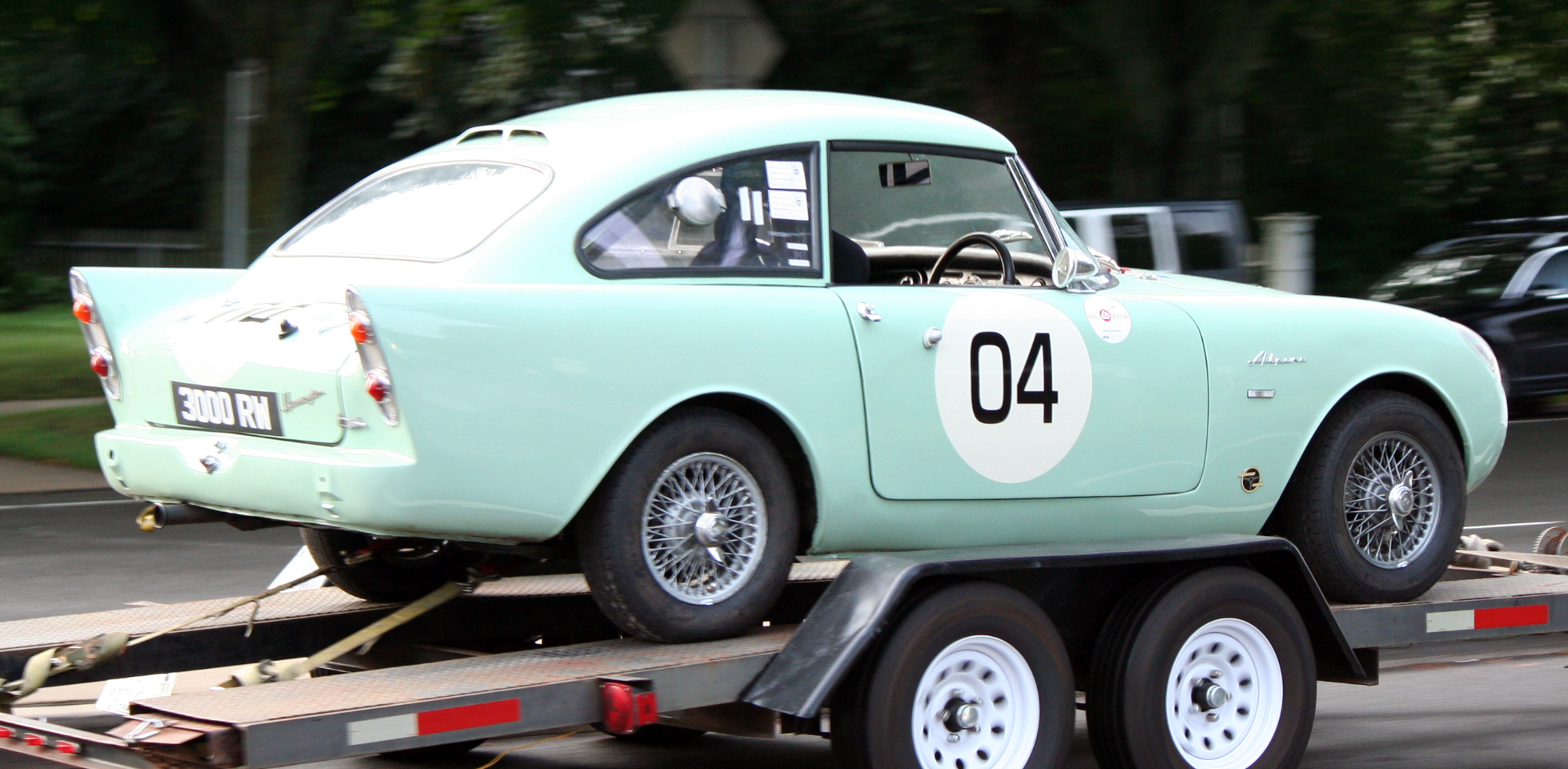
1961 Harrington Alpine

The Alpine enjoyed relative success in European and North American competition. Probably the most notable international success was at Le Mans, where a Sunbeam Harrington won the Thermal Index of Efficiency in 1961. In the United States the Alpine competed successfully in Sports Car Club of America (SCCA) events.

Vince Tamburo won the G-Production National Championship in 1960 using the 1494 cc Series I Alpine. In 1961 Don Sesslar took 2nd in the F-Production National Championship followed by a 3rd in the Championship in 1962. For 1963 the Alpine was moved into E-Production facing stiff competition from a class dominated by the Porsche 356. Sesslar tied in points for the national championship while Norman Lamb won the Southwest Division Championship in his Alpine.

A championship for Don Sesslar finally was achieved in 1964 with 5 wins (the SCCA totaled the 5 top finishes for the year). Dan Carmichael won the Central Division Championship in 1964 and '65. Carmichael continued to race the Alpine until 1967, when he finished 2nd at the American Road Race of Champions.

Bernard Unett raced factory prototype Alpine (registration number XRW 302) from 1962 to 1964 and in 1964 won the Fredy Dixon challenge trophy, which was considered to be biggest prize on the British club circuit at the time. Unett went on to become British Touring car champion three times during the 1970s.

A six-car works team was set up for the 1953 Alpine Rally. Although outwardly similar to their production-car counterparts they reputedly incorporated some 36 modifications, boosting the engine to an estimated 97.5 bhp.

== Alpine "Fastback" ==
Sunbeam Alpine "Fastback"
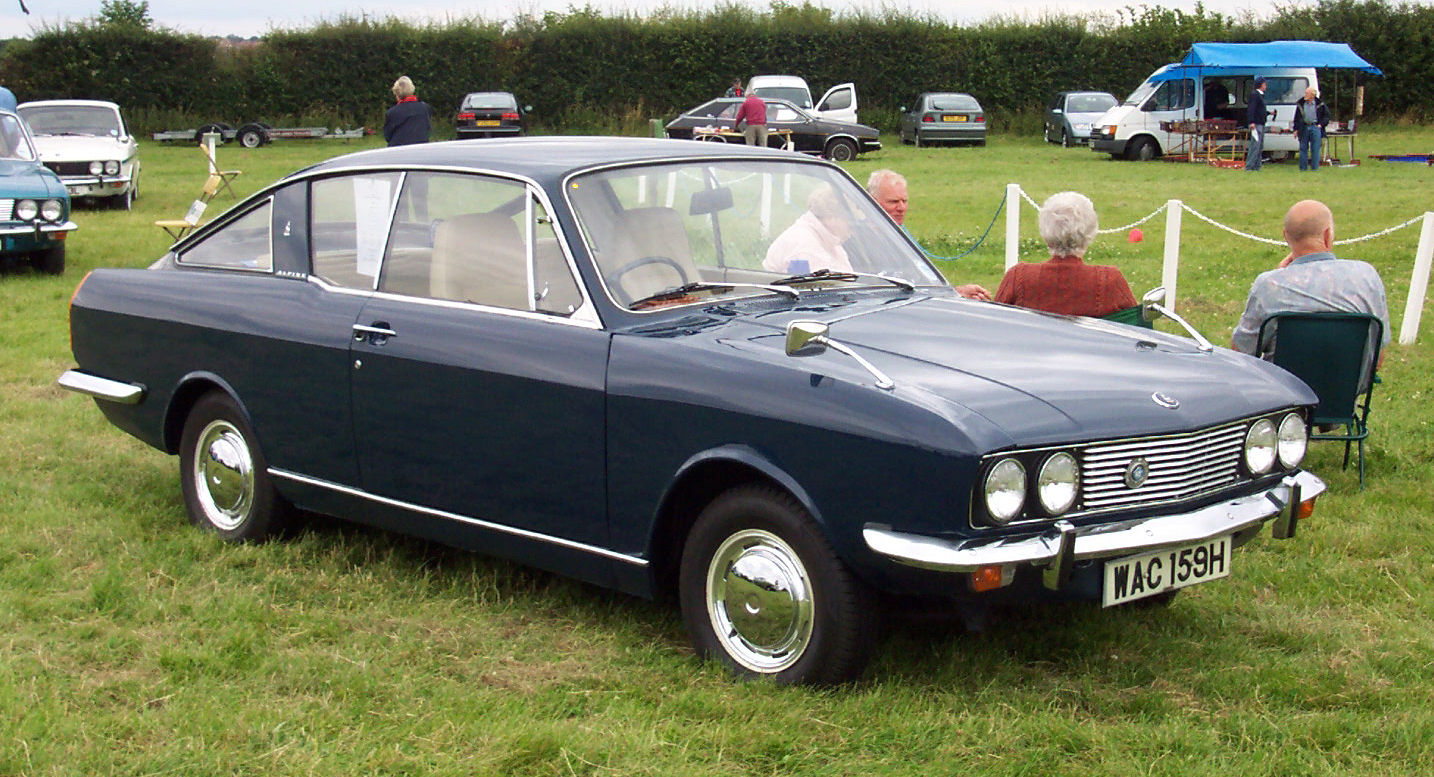

Overview
- Production: 1969–1975

Body and chassis
- Body style: 2-door fastback coupé

Powertrain
- Engine: 1,725 cc (105.3 cu in) I4

Dimensions
- Wheelbase: 98.5 in (2,502 mm)
- Length: 174.5 in (4,432 mm)
- Width: 64.75 in (1,645 mm)
- Height: 55 in (1,397 mm)

Chronology
- Successor: none

Rootes introduced the "Arrow" range in 1966, and by 1968 the saloons and estates (such as the Hillman Hunter) had been joined by a Sunbeam Rapier Fastback coupé model. In 1969, a cheaper, slightly slower and more economical version of the Rapier (still sold as a sporty model) was badged as the new Sunbeam Alpine.

All models featured the group's strong five-bearing 1,725 cc (105.3 cu in) engine, with the Alpine featuring a single Zenith-Stromberg CD150 carburettor to the Rapier's twins, and the Rapier H120's twin 40DCOE Weber carburettors.

Although drawing many parts from the group's "parts bin", including the rear lights of the estate Arrow models, the fastbacks nevertheless offered a number of unique features, including their pillar-less doors and rear side windows which combined to open up the car much like a cabriolet with a hardtop fitted. Extensive wooden dashboards were fitted to some models, and sports seats were available for a time.

== Post-Sunbeam Alpine ==
The Alpine name was resurrected in 1976 by Chrysler (by then the owner of Rootes), on a totally unrelated vehicle: the UK-market version of the Simca 1307, a French-built family hatchback. The car was initially badged as the Chrysler Alpine, and then finally as the Talbot Alpine following Chrysler Europe's takeover by Peugeot in 1978. The name survived until 1984, although the design survived (with different names) until 1986.

== Notable film and television appearances ==
- A metallic blue 1953 Sunbeam Alpine Mk I is driven by Grace Kelly in To Catch a Thief (1955) with Cary Grant.
- A Sunbeam Alpine Mk III is driven by Peggy Cummins in the film Night of the Demon (1957).
- A red Series I Alpine is driven by Elizabeth Taylor in the film Butterfield 8 (1960) and features in a number of scenes.
- A white Series 1 Alpine was the regular drive of Rod Taylor's character Glenn Evans, a crime fighting news reporter, in the early 1960s TV series, Hong Kong.
- A lake blue "Series II" Alpine roadster is amongst the first on-screen "Bond cars" when it is rented and driven by James Bond in Dr. No of 1962, most notably in a scene where Bond drives it under a crane to escape from pursuing hit men. It was reportedly borrowed from a local resident, as the only suitable sports car available on the island used for filming. In the novel, a Sunbeam Alpine was the chosen car of assassinated Secret Service agent John Strangways.
- Michael Caine's character is rescued by a woman in a white 1968 Alpine roadster in the 1971 British crime film Get Carter. The car is later shunted into a dock with the owner locked in the boot.
- A Sunbeam Tiger (the V8 version of the Alpine) was also the vehicle of choice for spy Maxwell Smart in the 1960s TV comedy series Get Smart. An Alpine, outfitted to look like the Tiger, was used for the "gadget" shots, such as the cannon that comes up through the bonnet. The Alpine was used because the cannon would not fit under the bonnet of a V-8 car. The car was modified by noted American customizer Gene Winfield and was the subject of a 1/25th scale plastic model kit.
- A similar Alpine is seen in the Arnold Schwarzenegger film Commando, where it was destroyed.
- A Sunbeam Alpine is driven by Michael Caine in the 1966 film Gambit. The film also starred Shirley MacLaine and Herbert Lom.
- A powder blue 1967 Sunbeam Alpine is driven by Tuesday Weld and Anthony Perkins in the 1968 film Pretty Poison.
- A Sunbeam Alpine V is shown in the final seconds of the 1982 short A Shocking Accident
- In the television series Heartbeat, the character of Jackie Bradley, portrayed by Fiona Dolman, drives a green hardtop Series V Sunbeam Alpine, with red interior, bearing the original registration plate LVY 666F (1967), in series 9–10. This was actually a white (fully restored) car originally but it was sprayed green to appear in the show to prevent glare. In Series 11, episode 12, Closing the Book two characters arrive at Scripps’ Garage in a gold, hardtop Sunbeam Alpine, bearing the registration plate 836 FXH.
- In the 1966 Launder & Gilliat film The Great St. Trinian's Train Robbery, Flash Harry (George Cole), possesses a crimson Sunbeam Alpine which he refers to as his 'status symbol'. He and some sixth-formers use the car to chase after the train robbers (led by Frankie Howerd).
- A light blue 1963 Sunbeam Alpine Series III is driven by Nancy Drew in the 2019 TV series of the same name.
- Sandra Dee drives a red 1966 Sunbeam Alpine Convertible Series V in 1970's The Dunwich Horror.
