= Hillman Wizard =

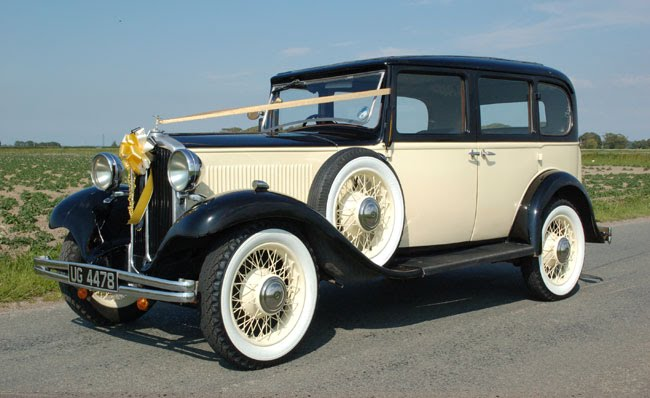
- 1933 75 de luxe 6-light saloon

Overview
- Manufacturer: Hillman Motor Car Co Ltd
- Production: 1931–33; 7,000 approx produced

Body and chassis
- Body style: Saloon, Tourer, Drophead Coupé, Limousine, Landaulette

Powertrain
- Engine: 2110 cc (65 model); 2810 cc (75 model)

Dimensions
- Wheelbase: 111 in (2,800 mm)

Chronology
- Predecessor: Hillman 14
- Successor: 65 model->Hillman 16hp (1934-35); 75 model->Hillman 20/70 (1934-35)

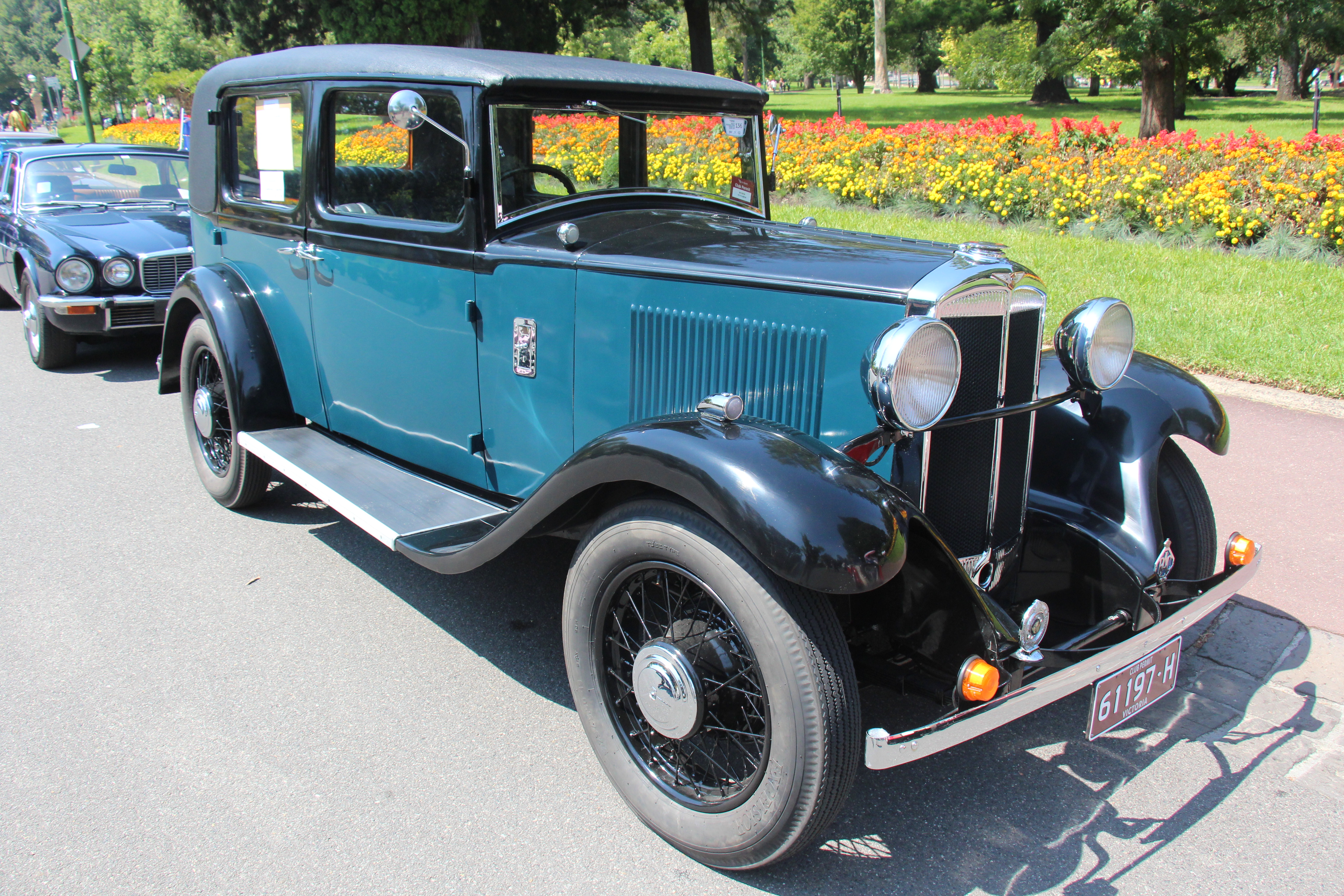
1932 sports saloon

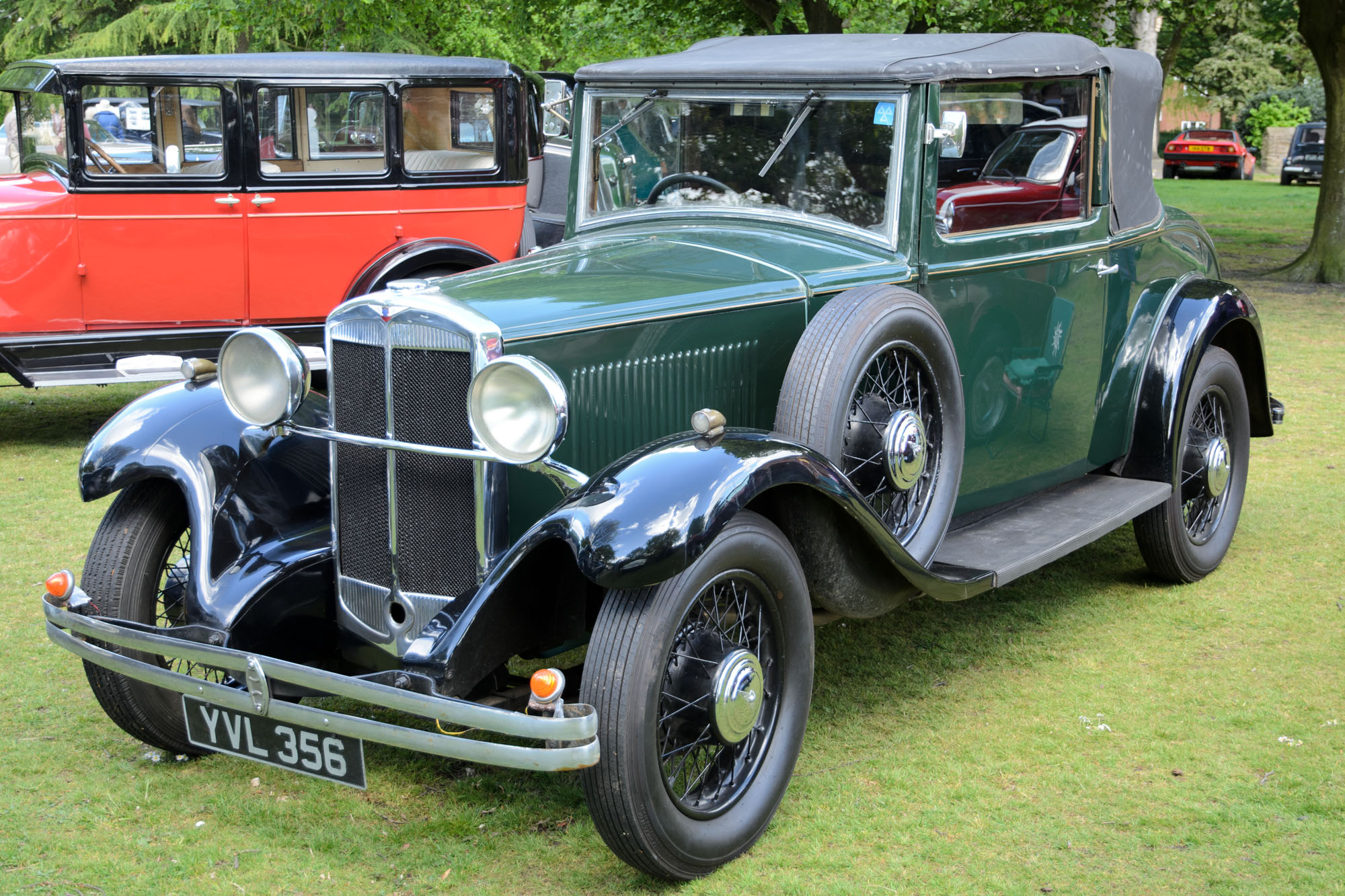
1931 drophead coupé

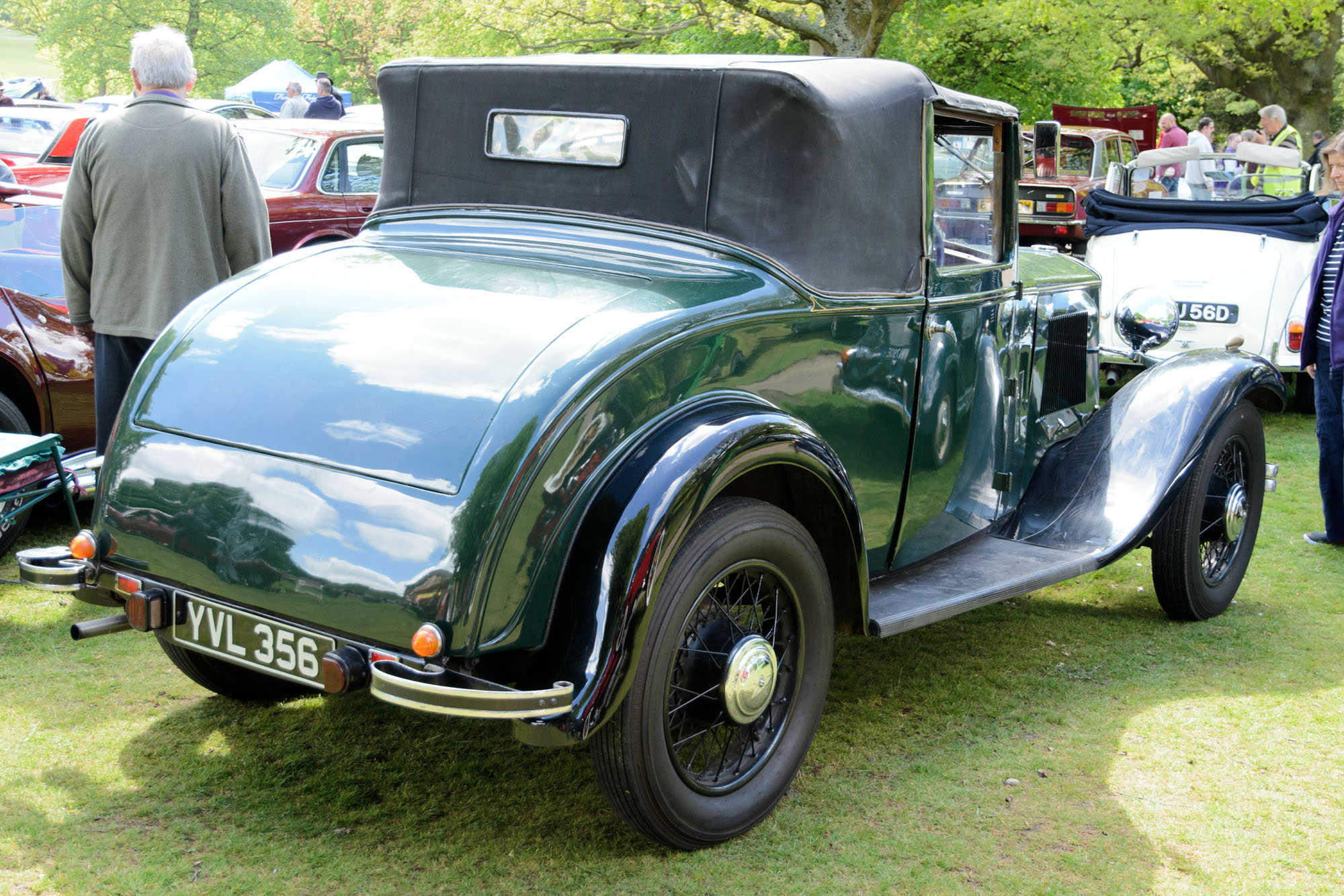

The Hillman Wizard is a six-cylinder car produced by Hillman between 1931 and 1933. Production began in April 1931 and continued until 1933.

The Wizard was produced in two models, the 65 and 75. The 65 model had a 65mm bore and was rated at 15.7 horsepower, while the 75 model had a 75 mm bore and was rated at 20.9 horsepower.

The key selling point for the Wizard, the self-proclaimed "Car of the Moderns", was that it had been tested for international conditions, not just those found in Great Britain. The car was reportedly subjected to every conceivable and practical test. Photos exist to this date of the Wizard being test-driven in France, Spain, Italy, Austria, Algeria, Egypt and Morocco.

== Body styles ==
The Wizard was first released with five body styles, each available in a choice of three colours. The models were the five-seater family saloon, £270; saloon de luxe, £285; coupe-cabriolet, £299; four-door sports saloon, £299; five-seater tourer, £270. The bare chassis was available for £198.

The cheaper family saloon and touring car models came with 19 inch steel artillery wheels. Wire wheels were available for an additional £7 10/-. All other models had wire wheels as standard, and Triplex Safety Glass throughout instead of only for the windscreen.

A Hillman Wizard was supplied to the Mechanical Warfare Experimental Establishment MWEE seemingly for testing between 26 September 1931 and 10 November 1932. Source National Archives Kew

== Powertrain ==
Both engines had a 106 mm stroke, meaning the 65 model measured 2,110 cc and the 75 model measured 2,810 cc The 75 model was predominately targeted towards export markets, given the additional £5 horse-power tax that was payable owing to its larger capacity. The straight-six engine featured side valves, a detachable head and coil ignition. There was a dry single-plate clutch and the gearbox had four speeds with silent third.

== Suspension and brakes ==
Suspension was provided by half-elliptic springs at both front and back, with hydraulic shock absorbers. Brakes were a Bendix-Perrot duo-servo series on all four wheels, operated through armoured cables by pedal or lever.

== Sales ==
It is estimated that about 3,250 Wizards were sold in 1931, approximately 2,186 in 1932, and numbers for 1933 are unknown. These were disappointing results for a car with so much promise, however the tough economic circumstances of the times almost certainly contributed to the weak sales results for a car that provided its owners with a then unfashionable perception of exuberance.

Meanwhile, the four-cylinder Hillman Minx was having a far more successful time, selling around 20,000 vehicles per year. The Wizard was discontinued from production in 1933. Rootes entered the six-cylinder market again in 1934, with the introduction of the Hillman 16hp & 20/70 models.
