= Humber Hawk =

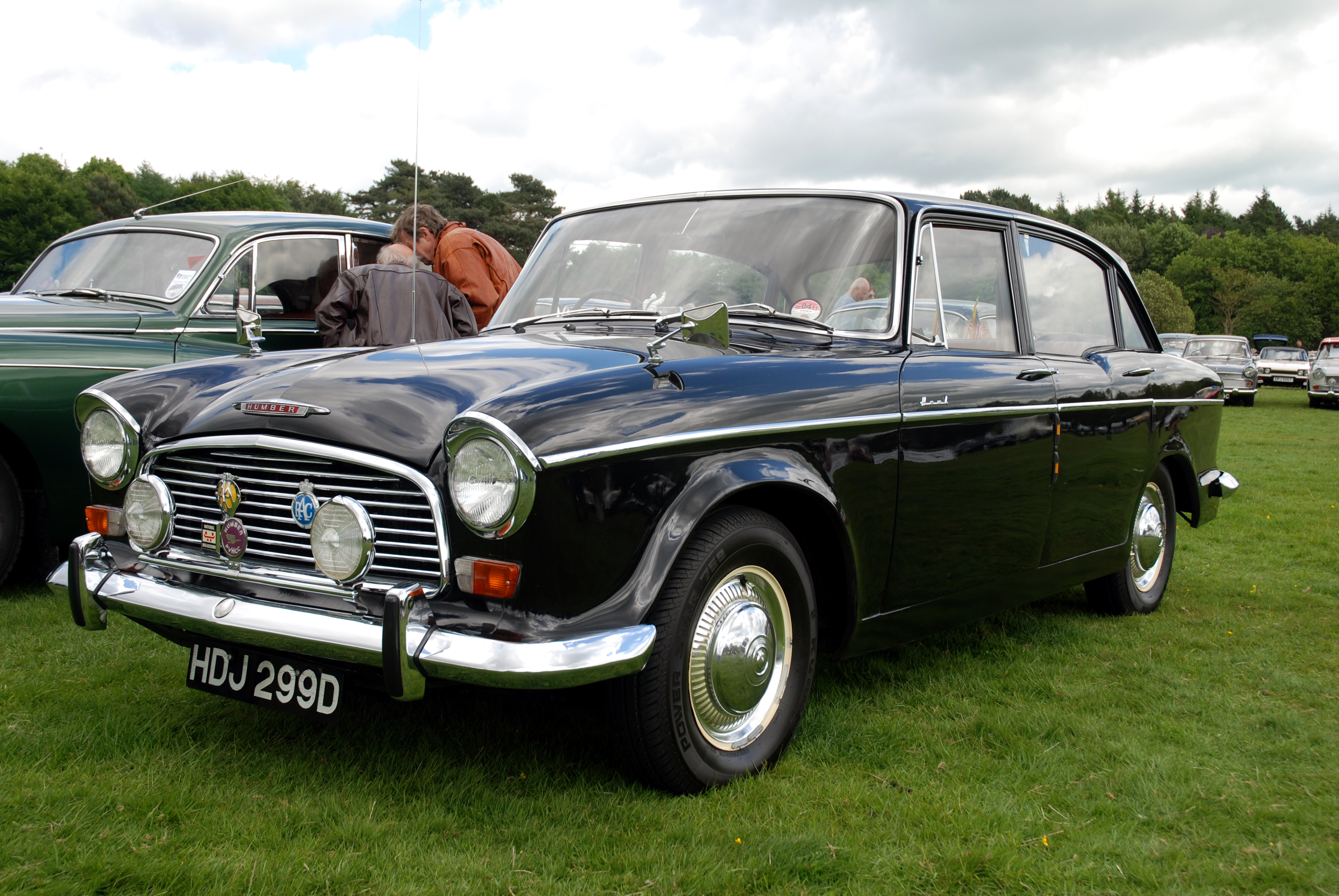
- Humber Hawk Series IV Saloon

Overview
- Manufacturer: Humber (Rootes Group)
- Production: 1945–1967
- Assembly: United Kingdom; Port Melbourne, Australia

Chronology
- Predecessor: Hillman 16 (1936-37) six-cylinder; Hillman 14 (1938-40) four-cylinder; Humber 16 (1938-44) six-cylinder
- Successor: Chrysler 180

The Humber Hawk is a four-cylinder automobile manufactured by British-based maunufacturer Humber Limited from 1945 to 1967.

== Humber Hawk Mk I & II ==
Humber Hawk Mk I & II
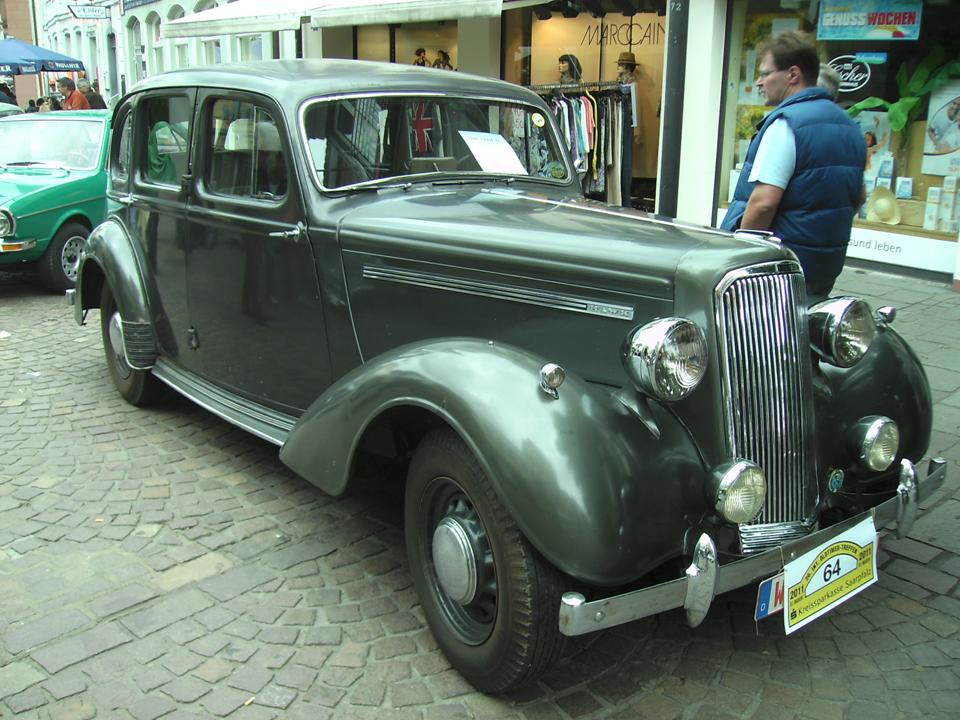
- Humber Hawk Mark 1

Overview
- Production: 1945–1949

Body and chassis
- Body style: 4-door saloon

Powertrain
- Engine: 1944 cc Straight-4 side-valve
- Transmission: 4-speed manual

Dimensions
- Wheelbase: 114 inches (2,900 mm)
- Length: 178 inches (4,500 mm)
- Width: 69 inches (1,800 mm)

The Hawk, a re-badged Hillman 14 (1938–1940) was the first Humber car to be launched after World War II. Slightly longer because of the new bootlid superimposed on its fastback tail and narrower having shed its running boards it also managed to be 112 pounds (51 kg) lighter than the prewar car.

The engine, from the Hillman 14 but uprated almost ten per cent to an output of 56 bhp, was shared with Sunbeam Talbot's 90s. It drove the Hawk's live rear axle through a four-speed gearbox with centrally located floor change.

As with the Hillman the four-door body was mounted on a separate chassis and was of the six-light design (three windows on each side) with a sunshine roof as standard. Suspension was independent at the front using a transverse leaf spring, and at the rear the axle had half-elliptic springs.

The Mark II version of September 1947 was not even a facelift, the main difference being a column gear change with a control ring fitted to the gearbox making it impossible to crash the synchromesh gears. The engine was given a new water jacket, the petrol tank received a breather to prevent air-locks and provision was made for a car-radio and retracting aerial. There was no change to the car's external appearance.

Top speed was around 65 mph (105 km/h).

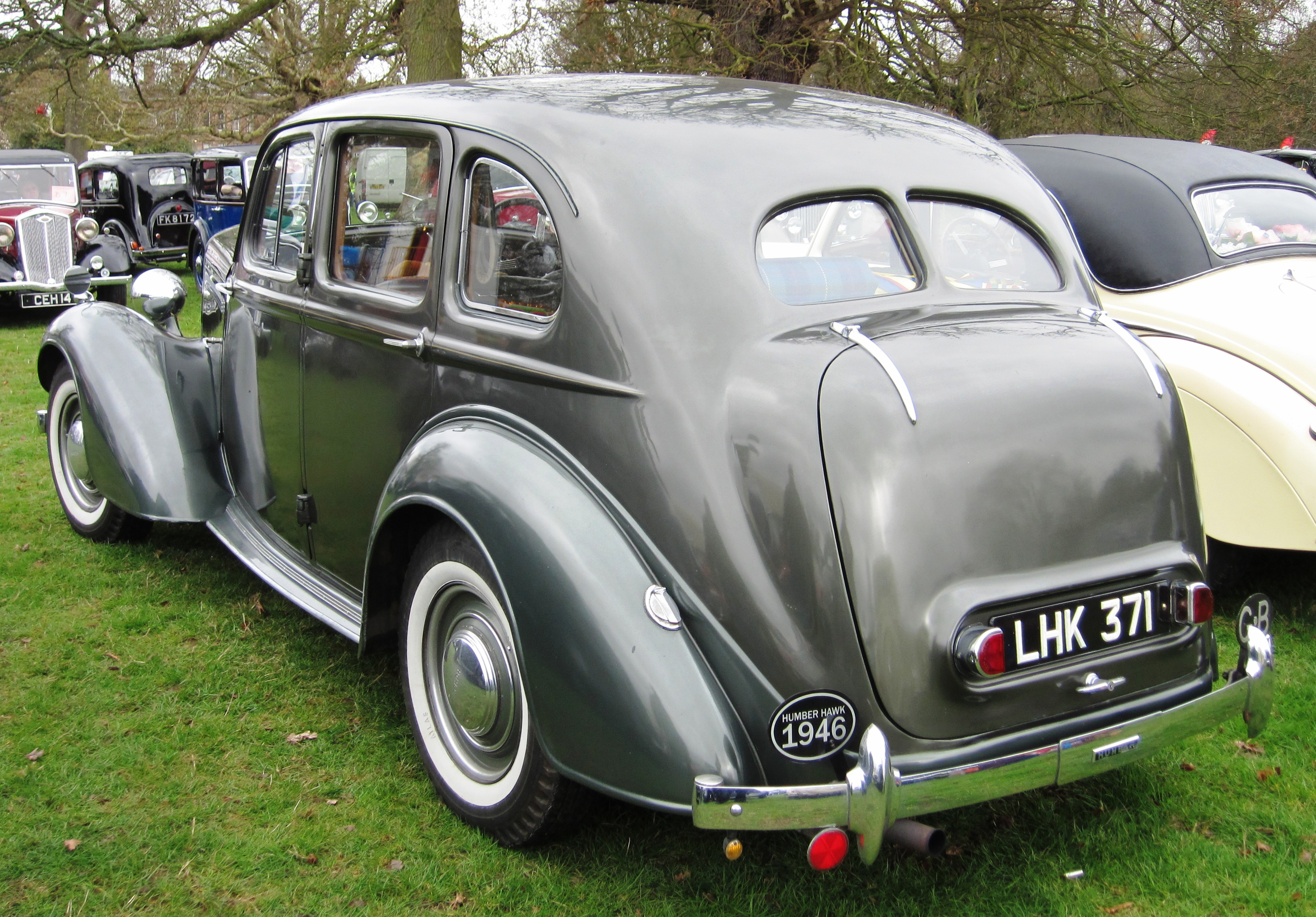
Humber Hawk Mark I of 1946

== Humber Hawk Mark III to V ==
Humber Hawk Mark III-V
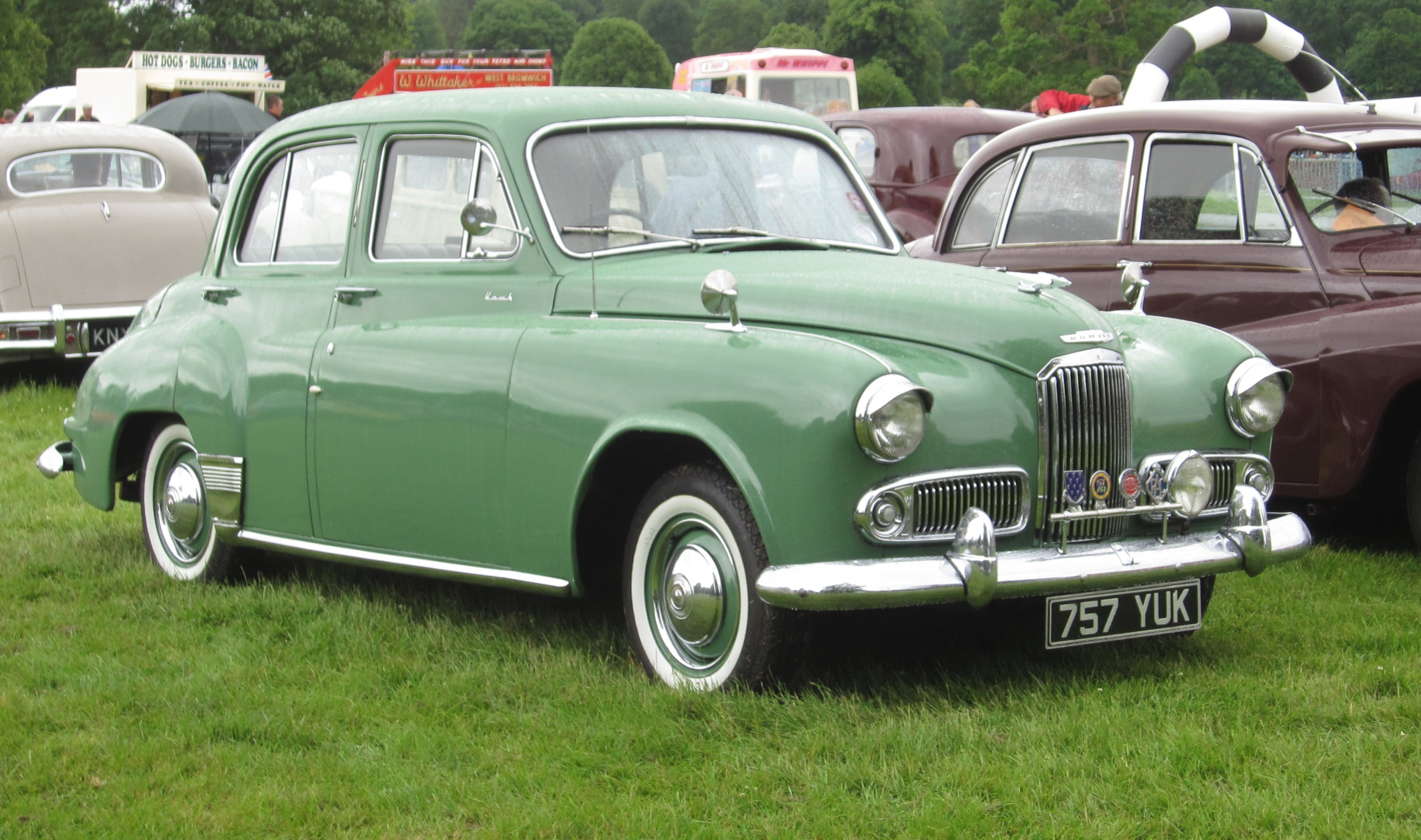
- Humber Hawk Mark V

Overview
- Production: 1948–1954 production 10,040 (III); 6,492 (IV); 14,300 (V)

Body and chassis
- Body style: 4-door saloon Limousine (Mk V only)

Powertrain
- Engine: 1944 cc Straight-4 side-valve (Mk III); 2267 cc Straight-4 side-valve (Mk IV & V)
- Transmission: 4-speed manual

Dimensions
- Wheelbase: 105.5 inches (2,680 mm)
- Length: 174 inches (4,400 mm)
- Width: 70 inches (1,800 mm)
- Height: 64.75 in (1,645 mm)

Mark III

The Mark III Hawk was a completely new car and was first shown at the London Motor Show in October 1948, but it still retained the earlier engine (side-valves, 1944 cc, 56 bhp at 3800 rpm) and transmission albeit with new rubber mountings. The new body was styled by the Loewy Studio and the separate headlights of the old model were gone, along with the separate front wings. The chassis was new, with coil-sprung independent front suspension replacing the previous transverse leaf spring. The body was now an integral component of the car's structure. The rear axle was also a new design with hypoid gearing. The body could be finished in a wide range of colours, both as two-tone and metallic. The metallic finishes would be offered on all the Hawks until the model's demise in late 1967/early 1968.

When compared with the prewar style body with vestigial running boards the car's weight was reduced by 3 cwt or 336 lb (152 kg) and the new flush-sided body gave room for the front bench seat to be three inches (76 mm) wider. The rear seat was a full five inches (130 mm) wider. Overall the car was six inches (150 mm) shorter and one and a half inches (38 mm) lower. Despite the lower height the new hypoid back axle allowed more head room in the rear seat.

Mark IV

In the early spring of 1951 the Mark IV version arrived with a larger, 2267 cc engine incorporating, as before, an aluminium cylinder head and with a 58 instead of 56 bhp output. However, at mid range speeds around 15 per cent more power was generated. The Mark IV also used larger, 15-inch wheels. The steering was now more highly geared and was commended by commentators for its lightness when manoeuvering the car in a confined space despite 53% of the car's 2,996 pounds (1,359 kg) being carried by the front wheels.

A 2267 cc Mk IV car tested by the British magazine The Motor in 1951 had a top speed of 71.4 mph (114.9 km/h) and could accelerate from 0–60 mph (97 km/h) in 30.0 seconds. A fuel consumption of 24.2 miles per imperial gallon (11.7 L/100 km; 20.2 mpg_{‑US}) was recorded. The test car cost £850, including taxes.

Mark V

The Mark V Hawk announced in September 1952 was given a larger clutch, larger rear shock absorbers, a strengthened body-frame and other minor mechanical changes. A new treatment was given to the car's front. It was also available as a "luxury touring limousine". A lowered bonnet line and wrap-around bumpers with over-riders distinguished this model from the Mk IV

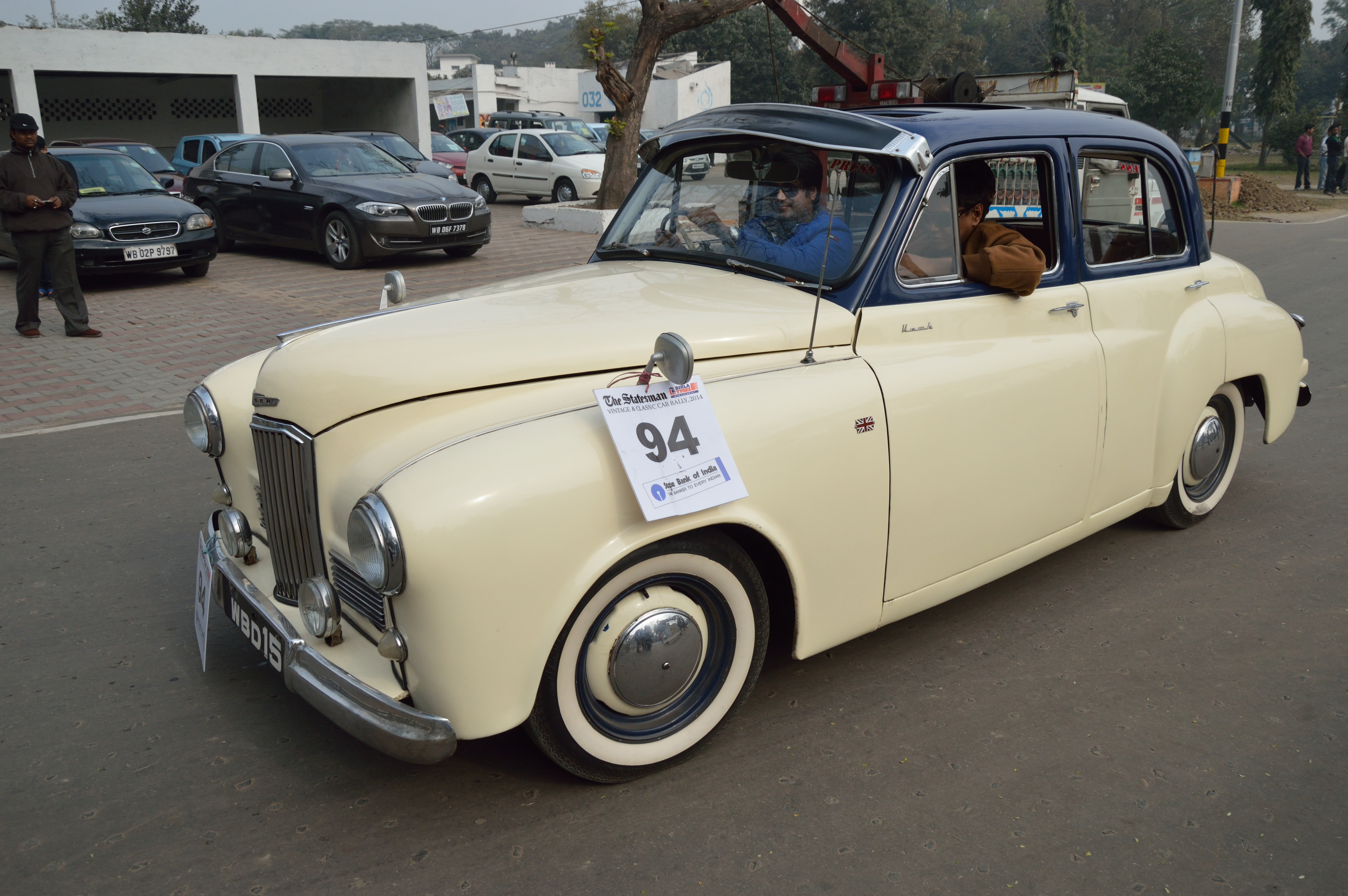
Humber Hawk Mark III

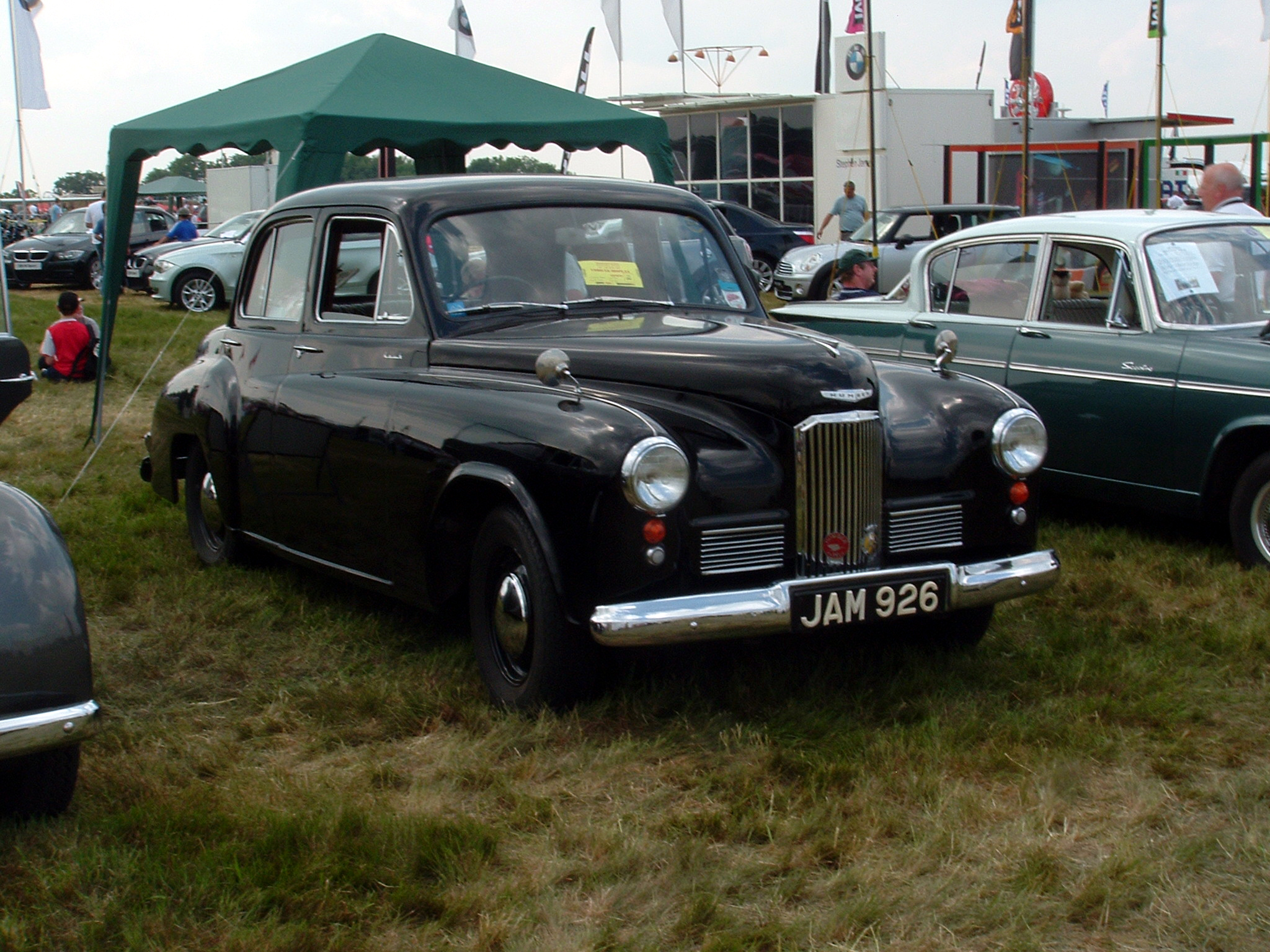
Humber Hawk Mark IV

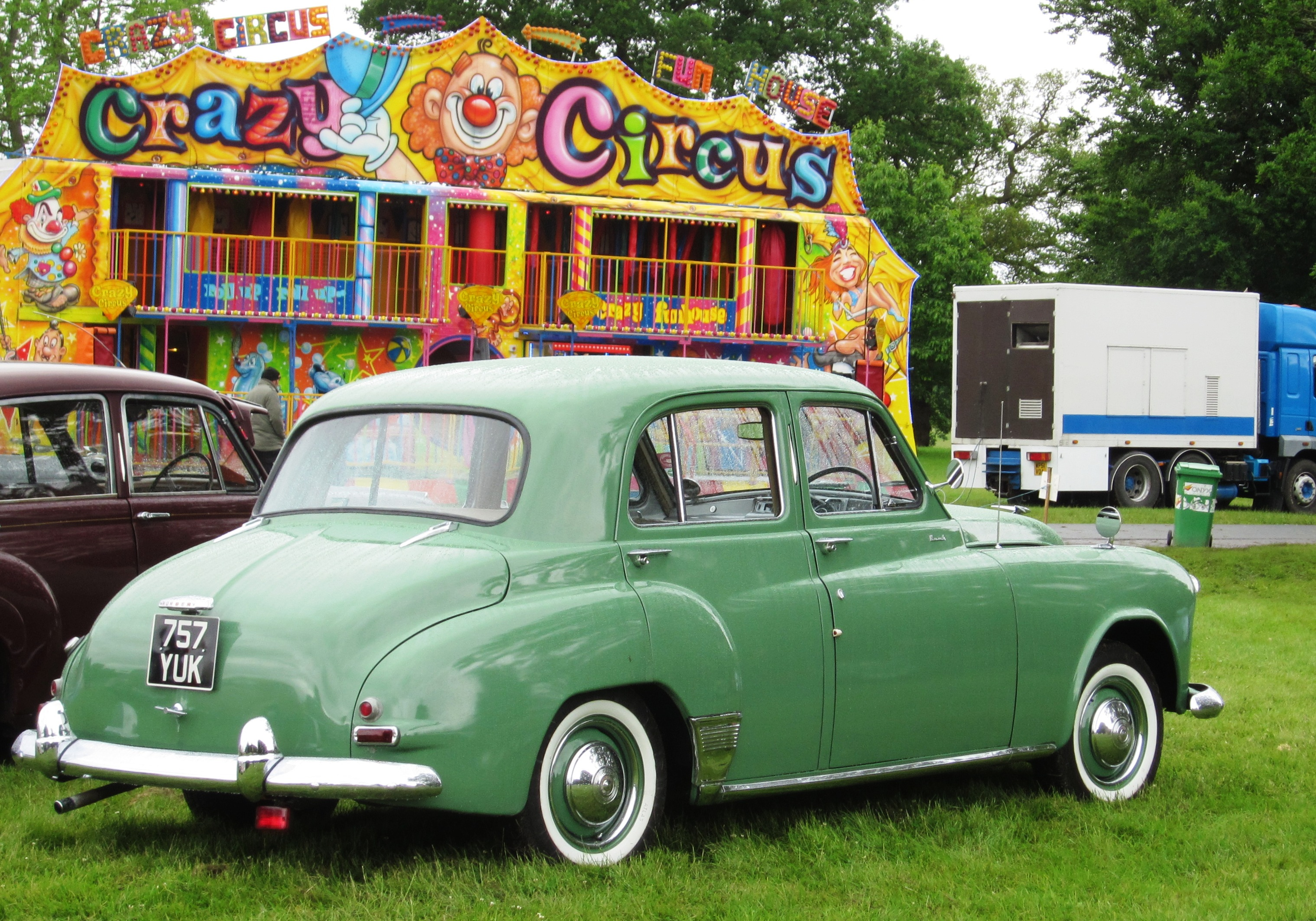
Humber Hawk Mark V of February 1954

== Humber Hawk Mark VI and VIA ==
Humber Hawk Mark VI-VIA
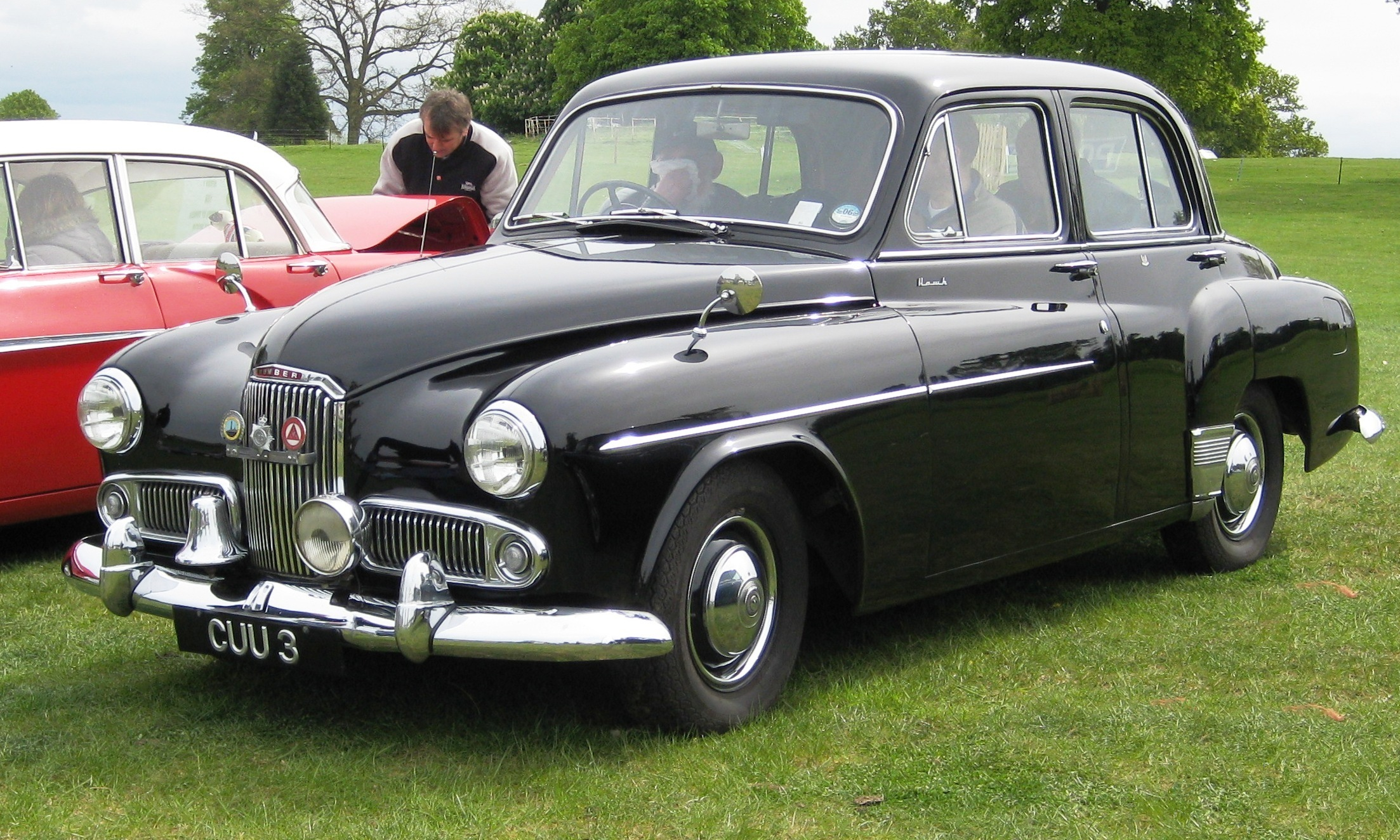
- Humber Hawk Mark VIA registered May 1957

Overview
- Production: 1954–1957 production 18,836 (Mk VI); 9614 (MkVIA)

Body and chassis
- Body style: 4-door saloon estate

Powertrain
- Engine: 2267 cc Straight-4 overhead valve
- Transmission: 4-speed manual with optional overdrive

Dimensions
- Wheelbase: 105.5 in (2,680 mm)
- Length: 181 inches (4,600 mm) (saloon)
- Width: 72 inches (1,800 mm)
- Height: 65 in (1,651 mm)
- Curb weight: 27.75 cwt or 3,108 lb (1,410 kg)

The main change with the Mk VI, which was introduced in June 1954, was the fitting of an overhead-valve cylinder head to the engine. The rear of the body was slightly changed, which made the car longer. In 1955 an estate version with fold-down tailgate appeared.

The April 1956 Mk VIA was a fairly minor upgrade, with changes mainly to the interior. A de-luxe version was added to the range.

A replacement, slightly more powerful and with an entirely new body was announced in May 1957.

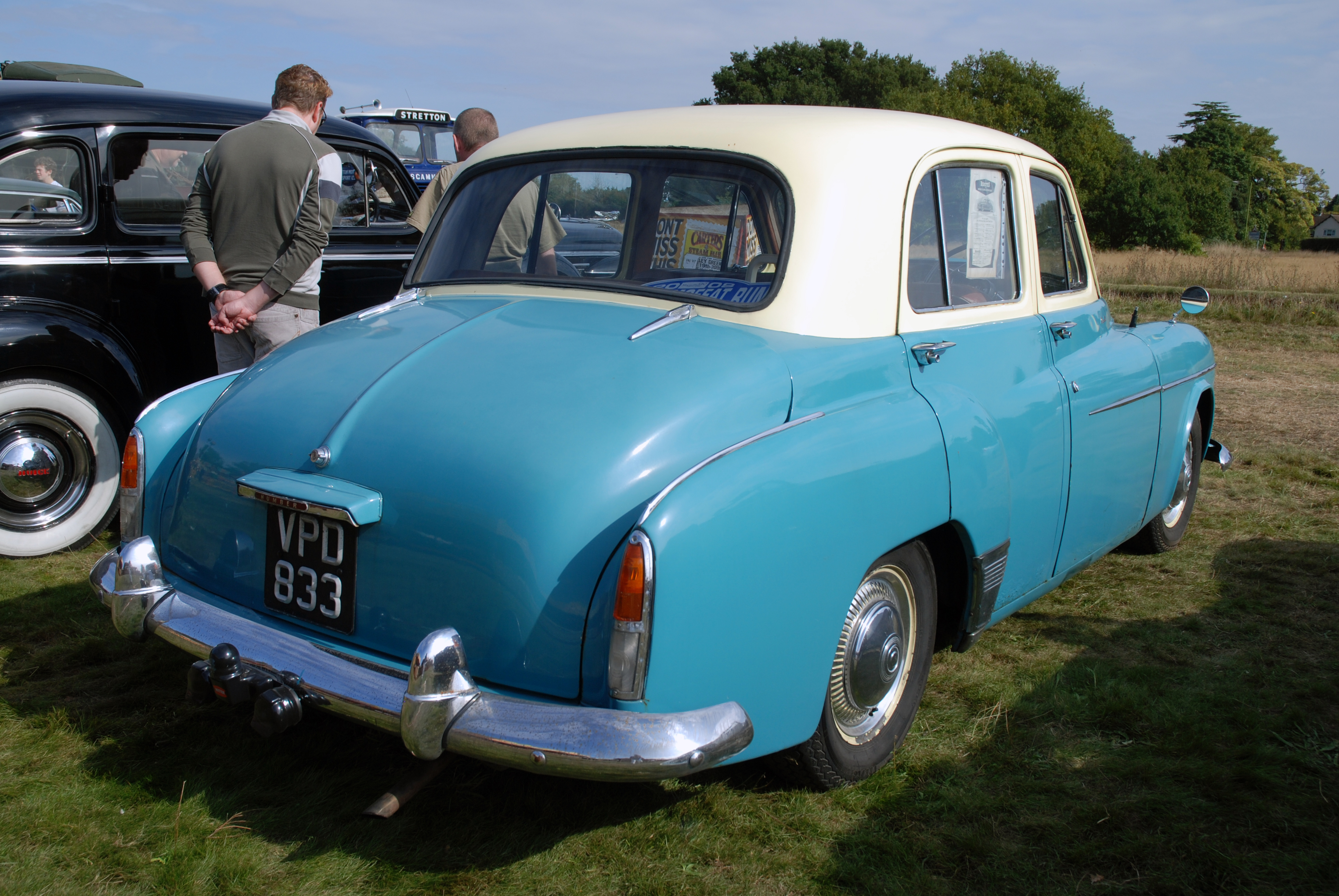
Mark VI registered 6 August 1954

Road test

The motoring correspondent of The Times claimed that any previous Hawk owner would be "astonished" by the Mark VI's 20 per cent more powerful engine's ability to effortlessly swing the car along at 70 mph. Cold starting was very good. The engine was not always so willing to start when cold. The tyres were inclined to squeal on not very sharp corners taken at any more than a modest speed. The brake lining area is now 40 per cent more than on the Mark V. The driver's windscreen wiper is badly located.

A Mk VI estate car with overdrive tested by the British magazine The Motor in 1956 had a top speed of 79.7 mph (128.3 km/h) and could accelerate from 0-60 mph (97 km/h) in 25.2 seconds. A fuel consumption of 22.8 miles per imperial gallon (12.4 L/100 km; 19.0 mpg_{‑US}) was recorded. The test car cost £1405, including taxes.

== Humber Hawk Series I to IVA ==
Humber Hawk Series I-IVA
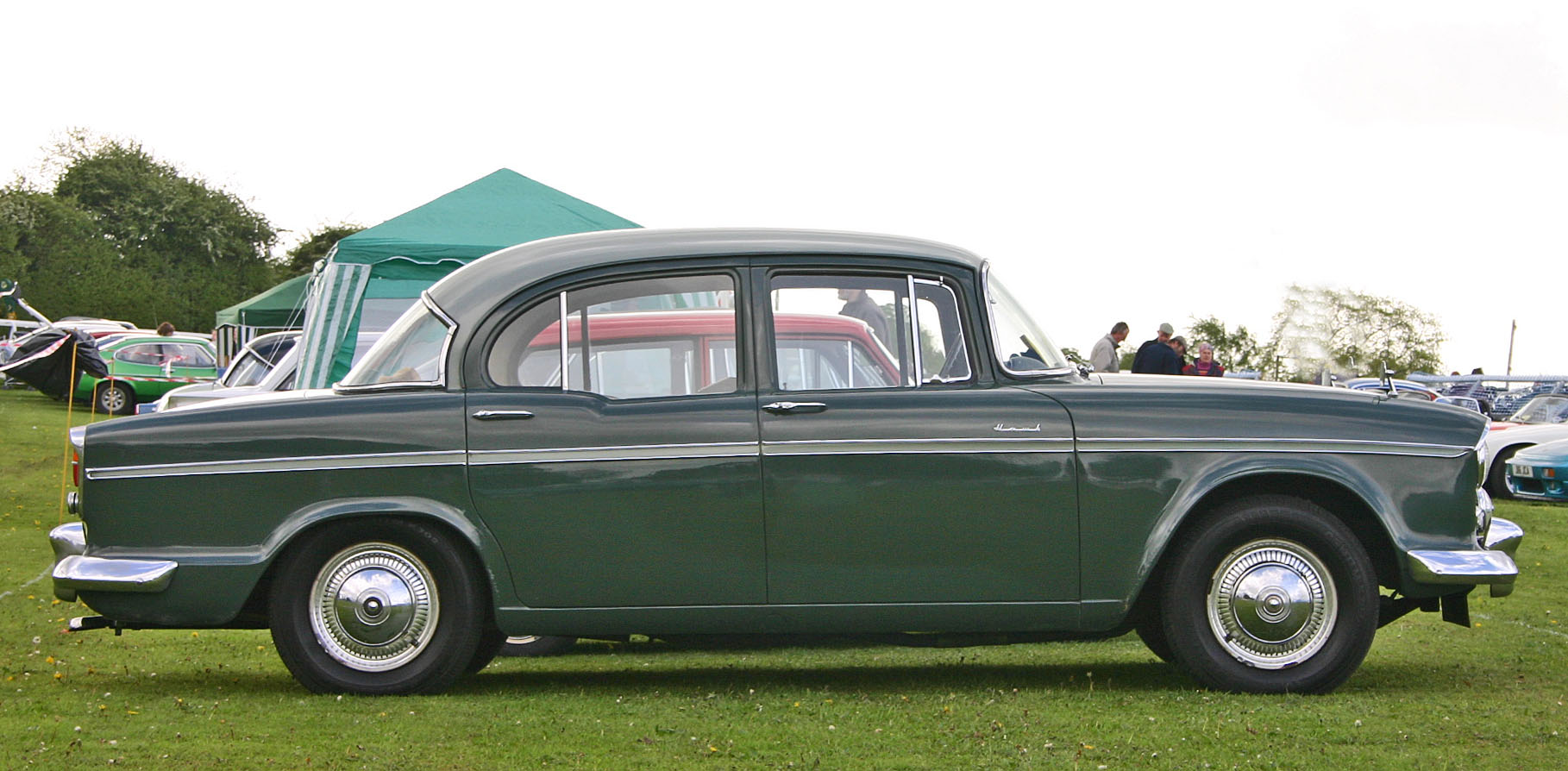
- Humber Hawk Series II Saloon

Overview
- Production: 1957–1967 production 15,539 (I); 6813 (IA); 7,230 (II); 6,109 (III); 1,746 (IV); 3,754 (IVA)

Body and chassis
- Body style: 4-door saloon Estate car limousine

Powertrain
- Engine: 2267 cc Straight-4 ohv
- Transmission: 4-speed manual all-synchromesh Overdrive and automatic optional

Dimensions
- Wheelbase: 110 in (2,800 mm)
- Length: 185 in (4,700 mm)
- Width: 70 in (1,800 mm)
- Height: 61.5 in (1,560 mm)

A new Hawk announced in May 1957 had a completely new body with unitary construction which it would go on to share with the 1958 Humber Super Snipe. The new model was, like its predecessors, a large car. For the first time an estate variant was available from the factory - the Hawk estate had the largest unitary bodyshell of any British-built car up to that point, a status it retained until the Jaguar Mark X was launched in 1961. The 2267 cc engine was carried over, though with modifications to the distributor mounting, and other details; and an automatic transmission, the Borg Warner D.G. model, was now available. The body was styled in Rootes' own studios and featured more glass than previous models, with wrap-around front windscreen, which gave it a considerable resemblance to a base model 1955 Chevrolet 4-door sedan. The missing rear quarter-lights were returned in Series IV. The estate version featured a horizontally split tailgate—the lower half opening downwards (to provide an extra length of luggage-platform if necessary) and the upper half upwards. The fuel-filler cap was concealed behind the offside rear reflector.

There were several revisions during the car's life, each resulting in a new Series number.

The 1959 Series 1A had changed gear ratios and minor trim changes.

The Series II launched in October 1960 had disc front brakes, servo-assisted. The automatic option was no longer available on the home market.

The Series III of September 1962 had a larger fuel tank and bigger rear window. The export model automatic option was also dropped.

More significant changes came with the October 1964 Series IV. The roof was made flatter, the rear window smaller and an extra side window fitted behind the rear doors. Synchromesh was fitted to bottom gear. An anti-roll bar was fitted at the rear.

The final Series IVA of 1965 saw the automatic option re-introduced, this time being the Borg Warner Model 35.

A Series I car without overdrive was tested by the British The Motor magazine in 1957 had a top speed of 83.9 mph (135.0 km/h) and could accelerate from 0-60 mph (97 km/h) in 19.7 seconds. A fuel consumption of 22.5 miles per imperial gallon (12.6 L/100 km; 18.7 mpg_{‑US}) was recorded. The test car cost £1261, including taxes of £421.

In March 1967 Rootes announced that production of the Humber Hawk, along with that of the Super Snipe and Imperial had ceased. The announcement stated that the cars' place in their range would be filled by Chrysler Valiants imported from Australia.

After Hawk production ended, Rootes came to concentrate on sectors offering greater volume, no longer featuring as a UK provider of large family cars. It had, in particular, been unusual for UK manufactured cars of this size to feature a spacious station wagon / estate car version; and, following the demise of the Humber Hawk, the UK market for large estate cars quickly came to be dominated by the Volvo 145, introduced to the UK in March 1968, and its successors.

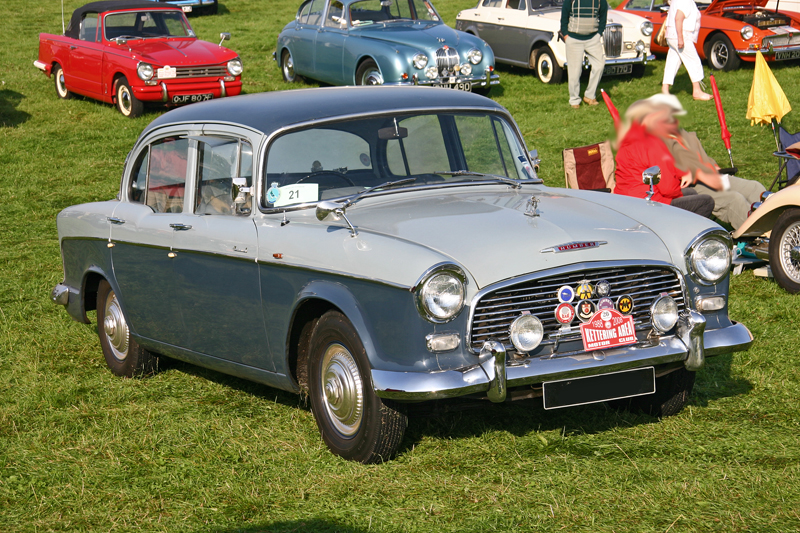
Humber Hawk Series I Saloon

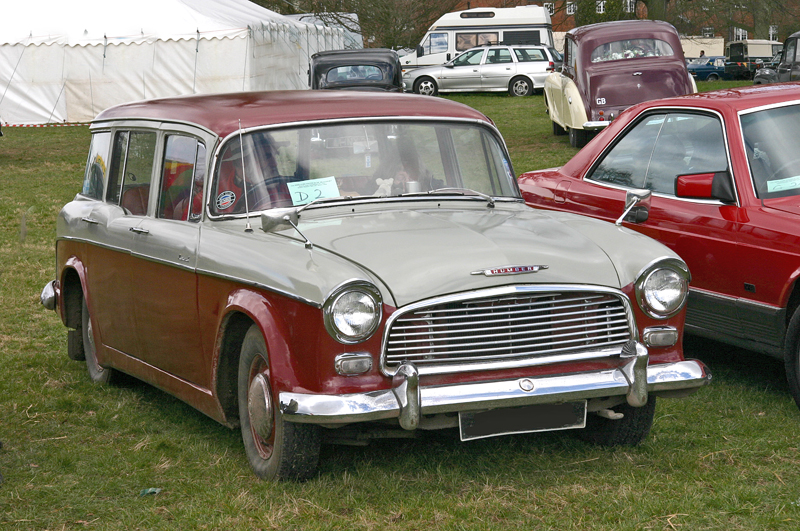
Humber Hawk Series I Estate

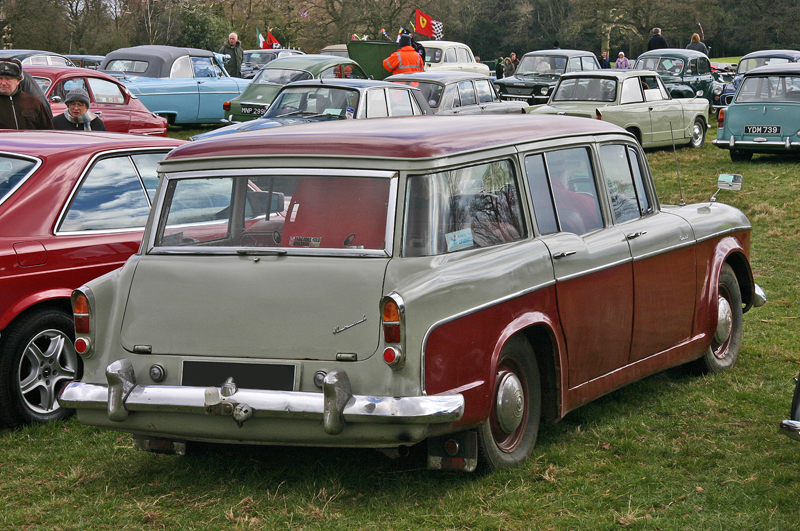
Humber Hawk Series I Estate

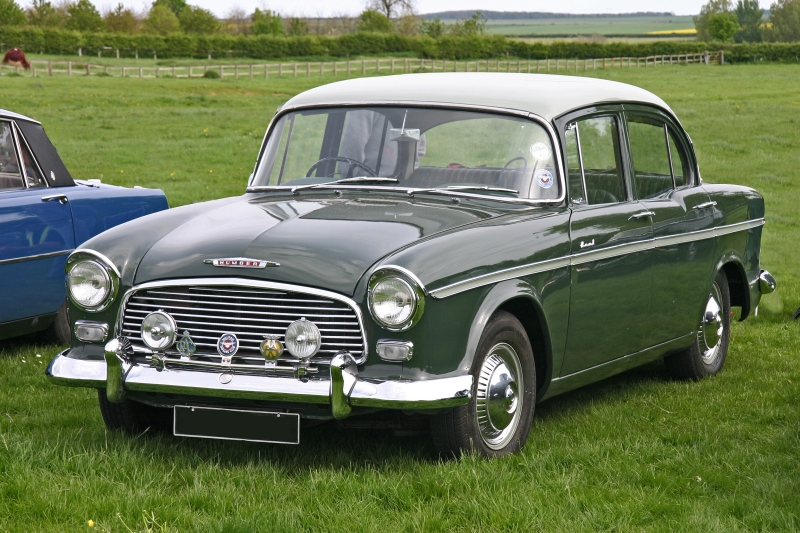
Humber Hawk Series II Saloon

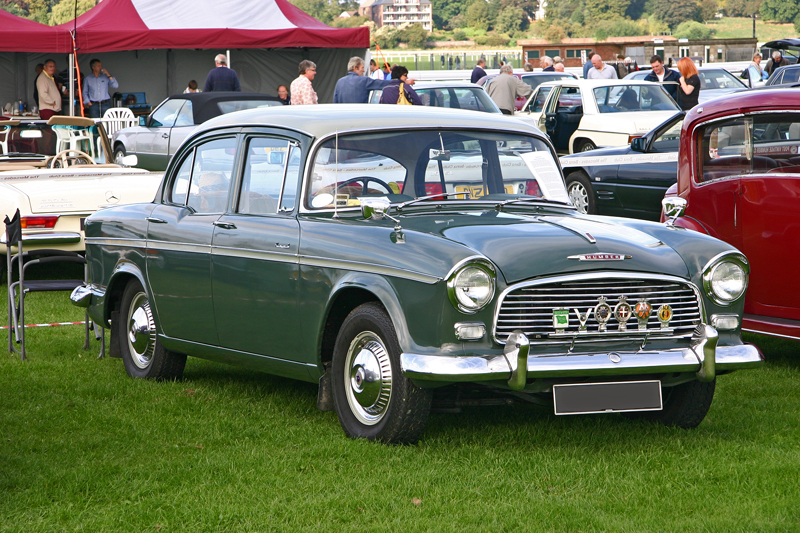
Humber Hawk Series III Saloon

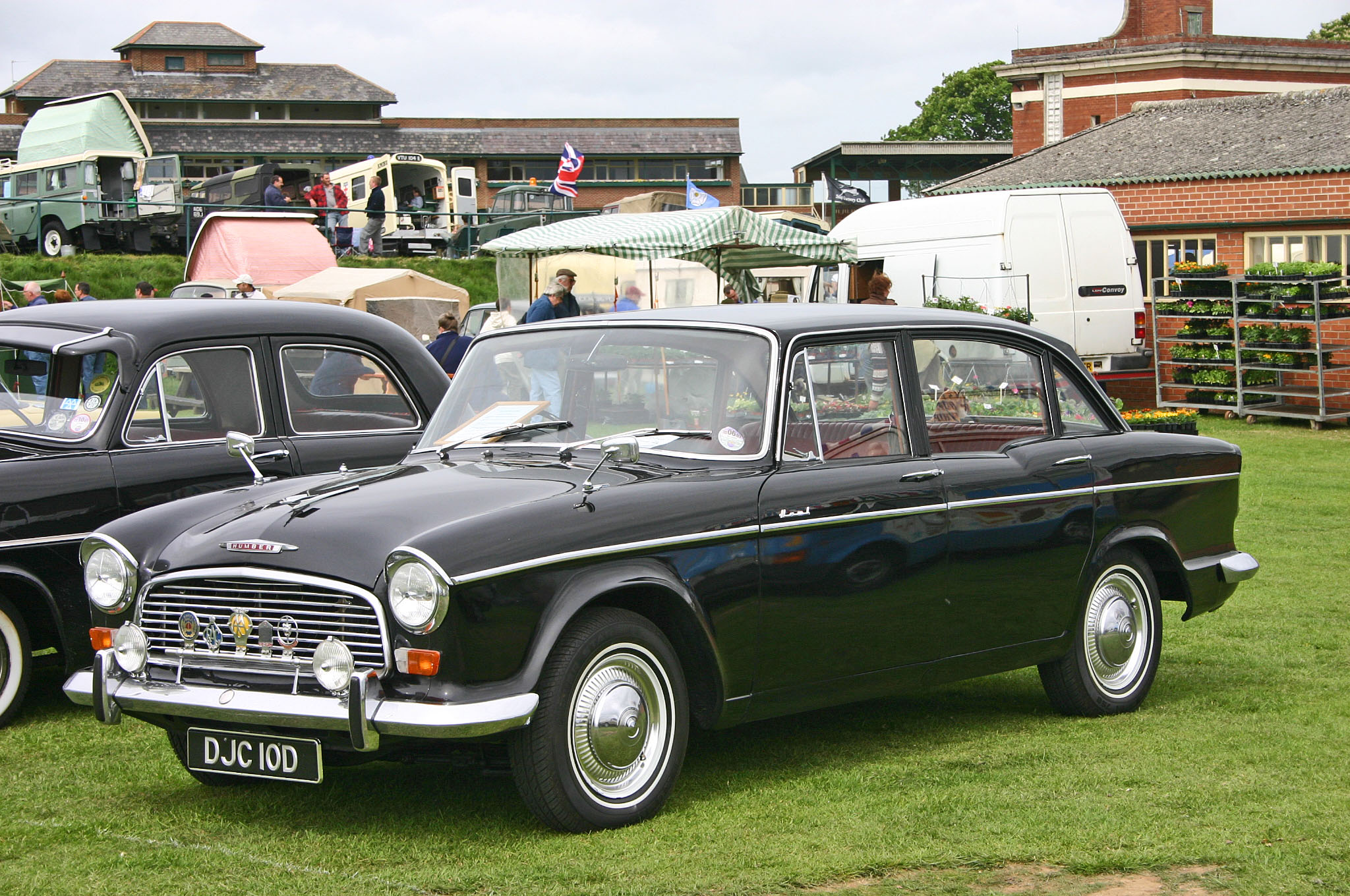
Humber Hawk Series IV Saloon

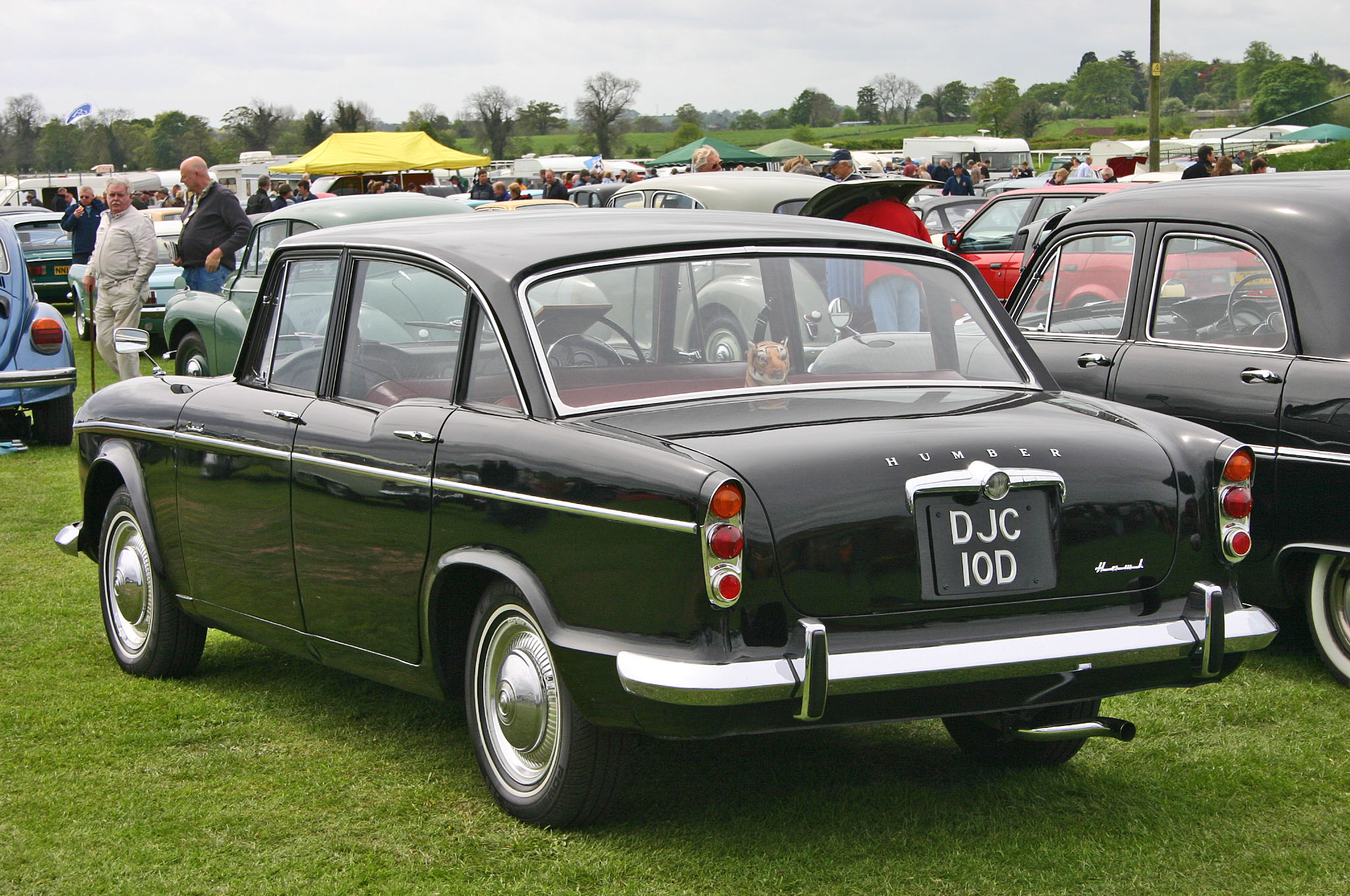
Humber Hawk Series IV Saloon

== Scale models ==
- Meccano Dinky Toys; No. 165 (production 1959–63), Series 1 Hawk, approximately O scale (1:44).
- Meccano Dinky Toys; No. 256 (production 1960–64), Series 1 Hawk Police car, approximately O scale (1:44).
