= Hillman 14 =

Hillman 14 hp
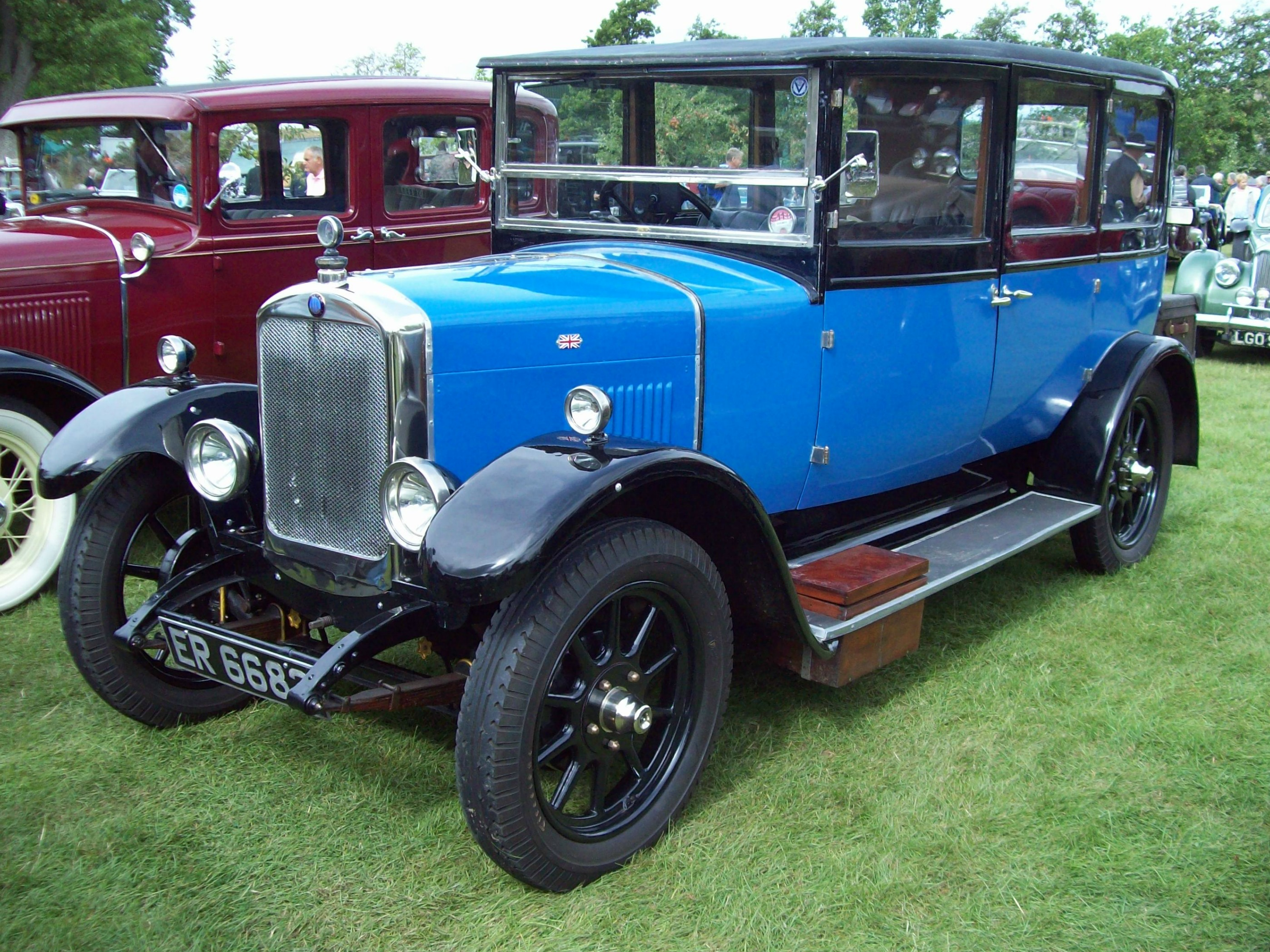
- 6-light coachbuilt saloon registered November 1926

Overview
- Manufacturer: Hillman Motor Car Co Ltd
- Production: 1925–1930; 11,000 approx produced

Body and chassis
- Class: Mid-size / Large family car (D)
- Body style: 4-door saloon (6 or 4-light, coachbuilt or fabric); all-weather drop head coupé; tourer; chassis for bespoke bodywork; van

Powertrain
- Engine: 1954 cc I4

Dimensions
- Wheelbase: 112 in (2,800 mm); 114 in (2,900 mm) from 1928; Track: 52 in (1,300 mm); 56 in (1,400 mm) from 1928
- Length: 162 in (4,100 mm)
- Width: 64 in (1,600 mm)

Chronology
- Predecessor: Hillman 11
- Successor: Hillman Wizard 65

The Hillman Fourteen is a medium-sized 4-cylinder car announced by Hillman's managing director Spencer Wilks, a son-in-law of William Hillman, at the end of September 1925. This new Fourteen substantially increased Hillman's market share and remained on sale into 1931. During this time it was the main product of the company.

Late 1920s fashion when engines and other mechanicals were firmly fixed to the chassis decreed that a medium-sized car like the Fourteen should be given a six-cylinder engine to reduce vibration. So the 2-litre Fourteen's place was taken by the 2.1-litre six-cylinder Hillman Wizard 65 in April 1931. This Wizard 65 was itself dropped in 1933. The 2.8-litre Wizard 75 continued (renamed 20/70) alongside a 2.6-litre Sixteen and a 3.2-litre Hawk, all of six cylinders. For four years Hillman had no offering in the 2-litre slot.

The six-cylinder cars were not as successful as had been expected, and in October 1937 a new 2-litre four-cylinder Hillman Fourteen with a handsome new body filled their previous place in the Hillman range. Hillman now offered just their Minx and this new Fourteen.

In 1946 production resumed but the former Hillman Fourteens were now given a protruding boot lid and no running boards and badged Humber Hawk.

== New market segment ==
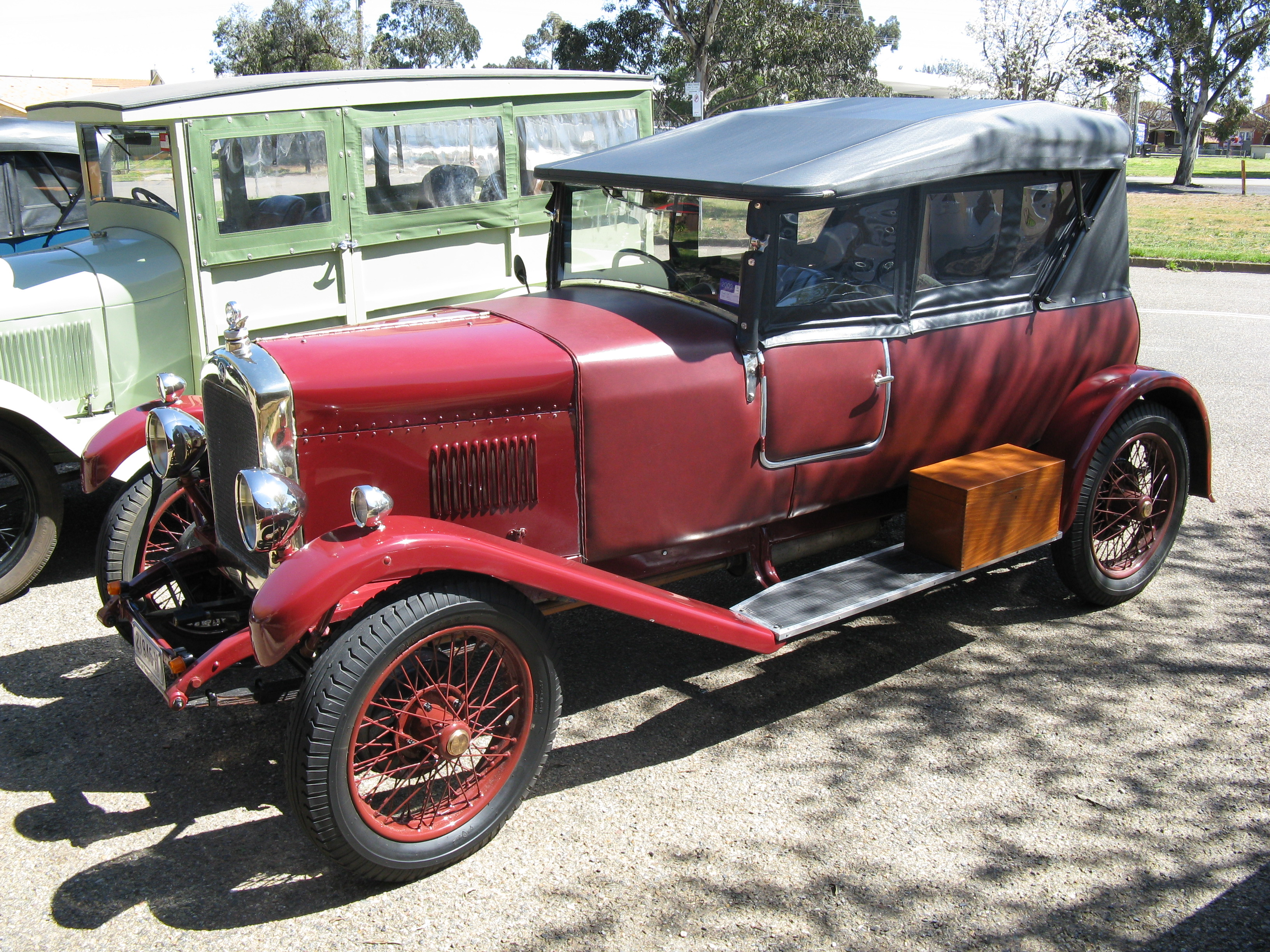
1927 Weymann-style tourer

In the early 1920s Hillman had concentrated on smaller cars with the 10 and 11 hp models but with their 14 horsepower car they entered the larger sized class taking on the Austin 12 hp and Humber 14/40. The new Hillman was priced at £345 for the saloon, undercutting the Austin which sold for £455, it was advertised as "the car that costs less than it should".

Engine

The engineering was largely conventional with a 72 x 120 mm long stroke, monobloc, side-valve 1954 cc, four-cylinder 35 bhp engine built in-unit with a four-speed gearbox and spiral bevel geared rear axle.

Chassis

Four wheel, cable operated, drum brakes were fitted from the start but unusually a vacuum servo was an option. The handbrake had its own set of shoes on the rear brakes. The steel section chassis had semi-elliptic leaf springs all round.

In a test by The Autocar magazine, the top speed was around 55 miles per hour (89 km/h) and fuel consumption 23-24 mpg.

Bodies

A range of bodies were offered including saloons and tourers. The cars were well fitted out and spacious with a right-hand gear change by the driver's door, a feature regarded as up-market at the time. Safety glass was fitted in the windows of the 1928 Safety Saloon. Wire spoked or artillery wheels could be specified. A V-windscreened landaulette was advertised in 1927.

Standard equipment included: clock, speedometer, oil gauge, screen wiper, driving mirror, shaded dash-lamp, licence holder, rug rail, floor carpets etc.

=== Road test ===
In early January 1925, The Times's motoring correspondent described the new Hillman's engine as lively enough, quiet and vibration-free, but said the suspension was hard. There was no undue grumble or hum from the gears. All the controls including steering and brakes were said to work well, and the seats, front and back, were described as comfortable. The car's maximum speed over level ground was said to be 50-55 mph.

Update September 1927

Following two years of production improvements were introduced in September 1927 for that year's motor show. The wheelbase was lengthened by 2 in (51 mm) but not the car's overall length. The steering was improved for a smoother and lighter action and the column rake was now adjustable. The front brake cables were replaced with rods. The engine received larger crankshaft and connecting rod bearings and an anti-detonating ("anti-knock") design adopted for the cylinder head. A Weymann fabric bodied 4-light 4-door sports saloon (as chosen for personal use by Henry Segrave) with safety glass option and a 6-light Safety saloon (fitted with Triplex safety glass) joined the range. The artillery wheel option was dropped. Dipping headlights were a new feature. Separate seats replaced the front bench seat and both back and front seats were widened. There were also changes to the mudguards and running boards. The export car was widened to 67 in (1,700 mm) inches and its track to 56 in (1,400 mm) inches. A water-impeller and a large top radiator tank were also fitted to export cars.

=== Major facelift September 1928 ===
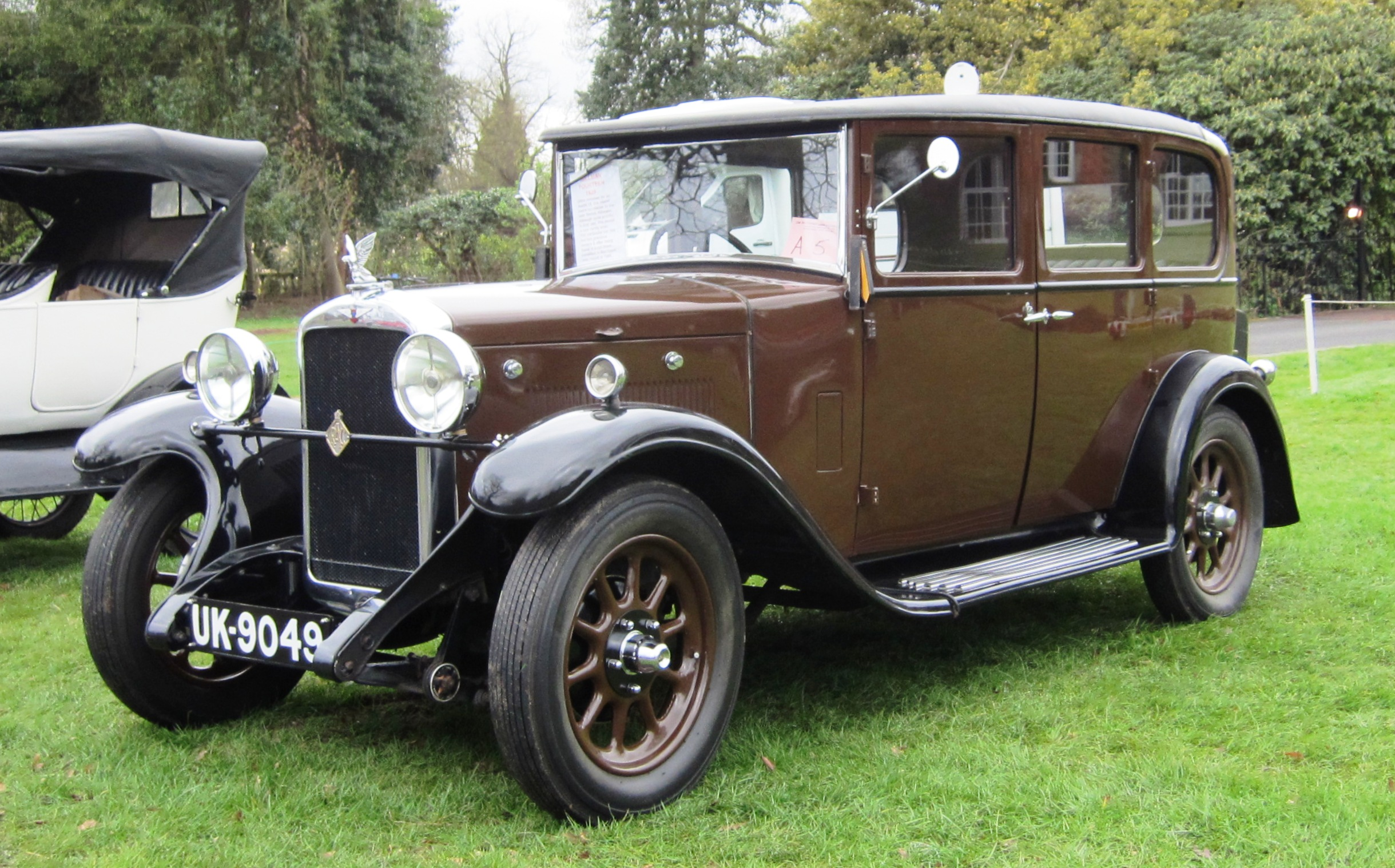
6-light coachbuilt saloon registered June 1930

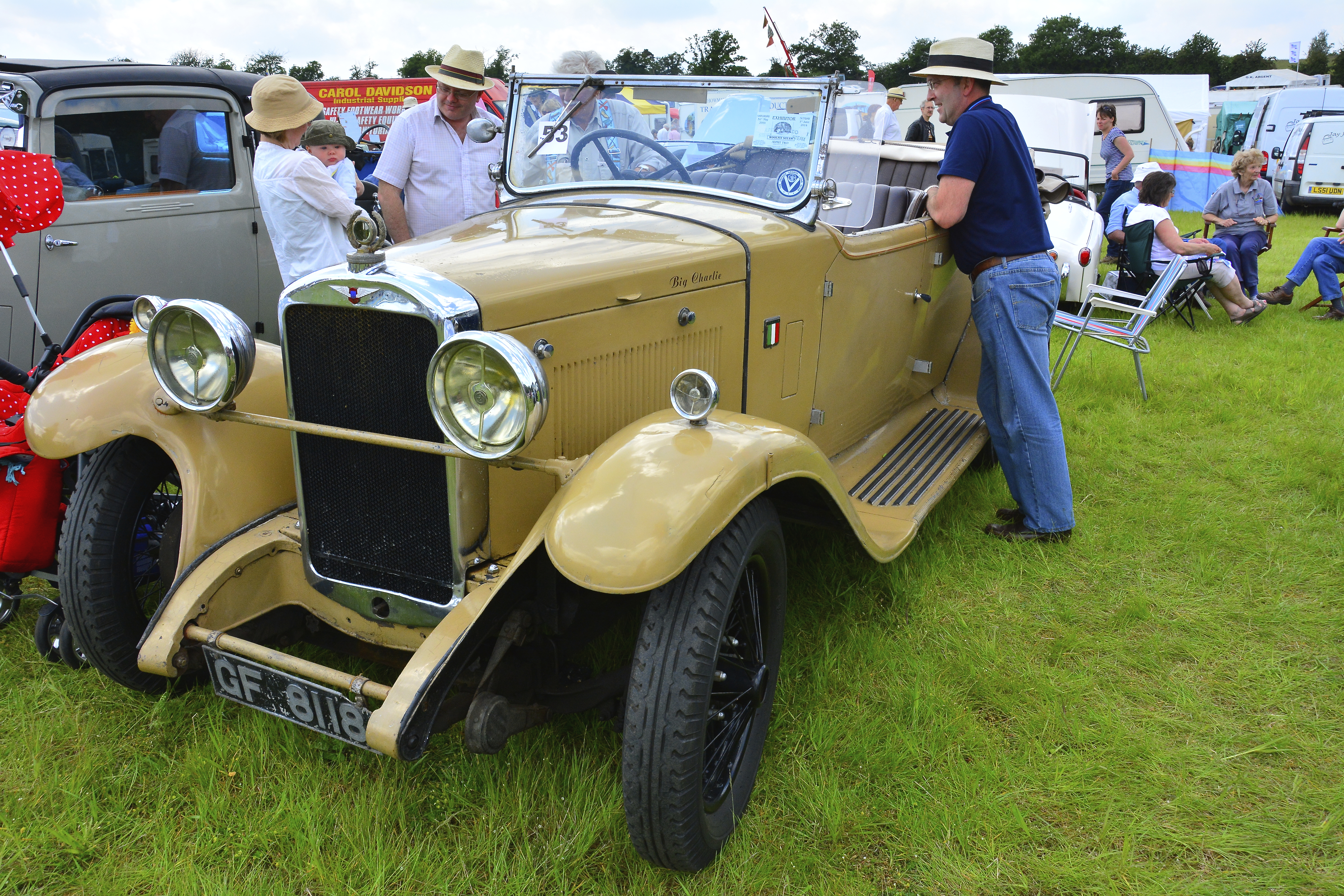
Tourer first registered March 1930

During 1928 the Rootes brothers obtained control of Hillman.
A new deeper radiator appeared in early September 1928 with larger headlamps on a cross-bar between the wings. The wider bodies had been lowered three inches without reducing ground clearance or head clearance. The body range was rationalised to a standard saloon, fabric saloon, Segrave coupé, tourer and Huski (sic) fabric-bodied sports tourer. There were major changes to a strengthened chassis and an increase in the track of the home market cars from 52 in (1,300 mm) to 56 in (1,400 mm). Other upgrades included a stronger Hardy-Spicer propeller shaft with metal joints, more powerful brakes and shock absorbers all round. An oil pressure gauge was added to the dashboard.

October 1929

For 1930 a stronger frame was provided together with longer springs employing Silentbloc spring shackles and improved brakes.

Olympia Motor Show October 1930

Three Fourteens were on Hillman's stand, a 2-door drop head coupé, a 4-door safety tourer and a 6-light Weymann saloon with a sunshine roof. Front seats could now slide for adjustment and a petrol gauge was provided on the instrument panel. The brakes receive servo assistance on the safety model. All the cars displayed had safety glass.

The following month the chairman advised shareholders at the annual meeting that the Fourteen continued to be well-received but six months after the motor show at the end of April 1931 its place was taken by the Hillman Wizard 65.

== All new car ==
Hillman Fourteen
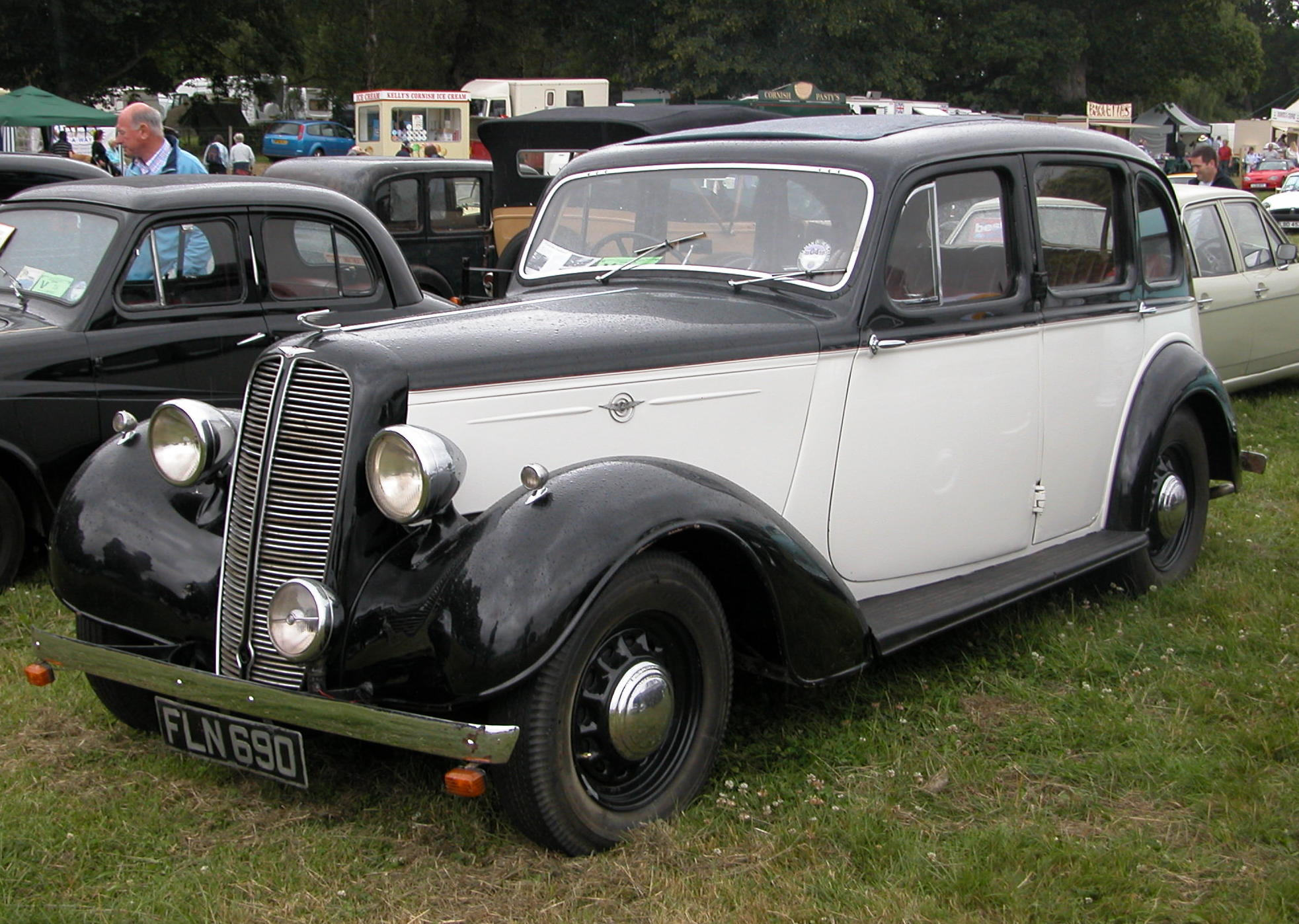
- registered January 1939

Overview
- Manufacturer: Hillman Motor Car Co Ltd
- Model years: 1938-1940

Body and chassis
- Body style: 6-light 4-door saloon
- Layout: front engine rear wheel drive

Powertrain
- Engine: 1943 cc straight four
- Transmission: single plate dry clutch, 4-spd gearbox, no synchromesh on 1st or reverse, open propeller shaft with needle roller bearings, half-floating spiral bevel rear axle

Dimensions
- Wheelbase: 114 in (2,895.6 mm) Track Front 56 in (1,422.4 mm) Track Rear 55.5 in (1,409.7 mm)
- Length: 172 in (4,368.8 mm)
- Width: 70 in (1,778.0 mm)
- Kerb weight: 3,024 lb (1,372 kg)

Chronology
- Predecessor: Hillman Sixteen
- Successor: Humber Hawk

Olympia October 1937

First displayed at the Olympia Motor Show in October 1937 some of its thunder was stolen by the "Ghost Minx" displayed beside it. Holes had been cut in the Minx's body and replaced by Perspex panels.

Body

The new 2-litre Hillman Fourteen was a much prettier car than their Minx's sole remaining stable-mate their 3.2-litre Hawk which it replaced. It was a straightforward, in essence simple, design for an economical four-cylinder car. Full use had been made of the wheelbase and track so five passengers may be carried in comfort. There were six side-windows and swivelling quarter lights in the leading edges of the front windows. Further air was supplied through a ventilator in the scuttle. The de luxe model's sliding roof was steel like the rest of the body. Passengers' feet were not restricted by footwells. Lockable luggage space at the back of the car was considered adequate, the spare wheel was carried in a separate compartment below the luggage. The windscreen could be opened high enough for a clear view in fog. Two wipers were fitted and three swivelling ashtrays. Front seats slide forward and back.

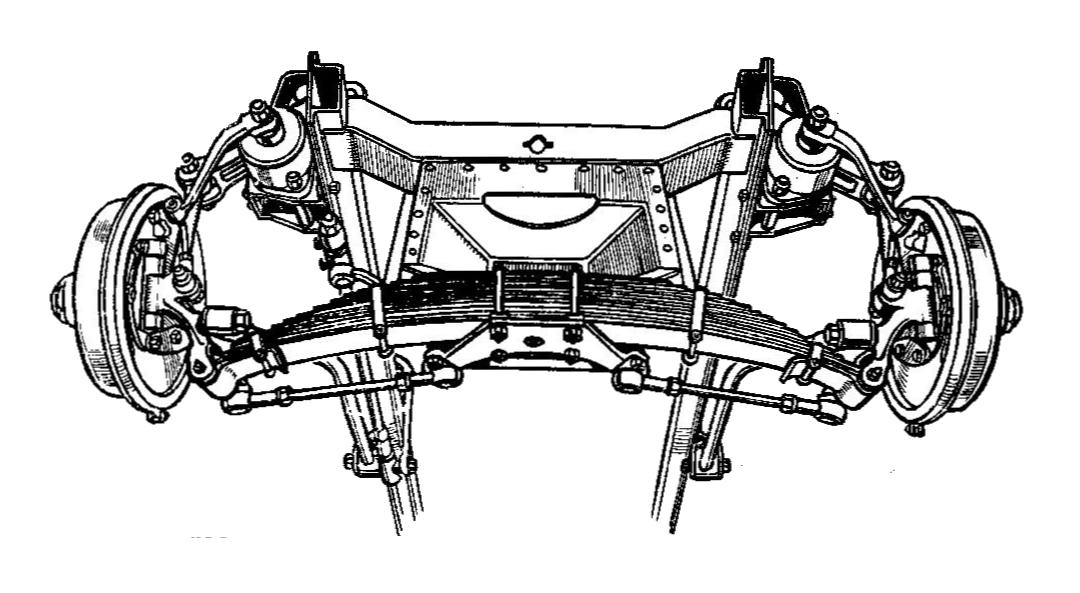
Rootes Group's Evenkeel front suspension

Brakes, steering and suspension

The brakes were made by Bendix-Cowdrey. They were mechanically operated and self-energising with 11 inch diameter drums. Rear suspension is by semi-elliptic springs but the front Evenkeel independent suspension was by transverse leaf springs. Steering was by a worm and nut device. Engine power was transmitted from the gearbox to the half-floating rear axle through a needle bearing open propeller shaft and a spiral bevel final drive. A system of jacking points was built-in.

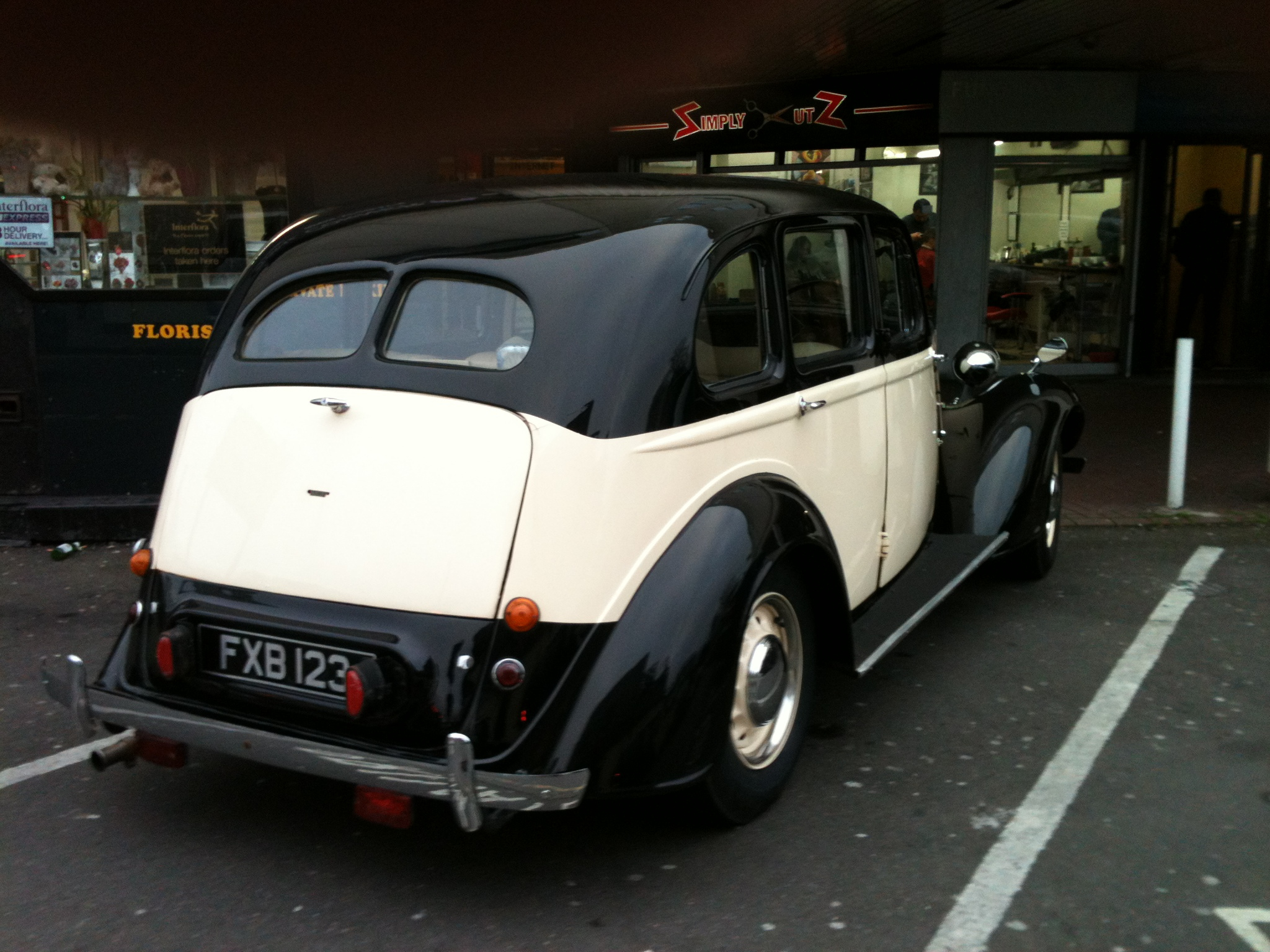
registered April 1939

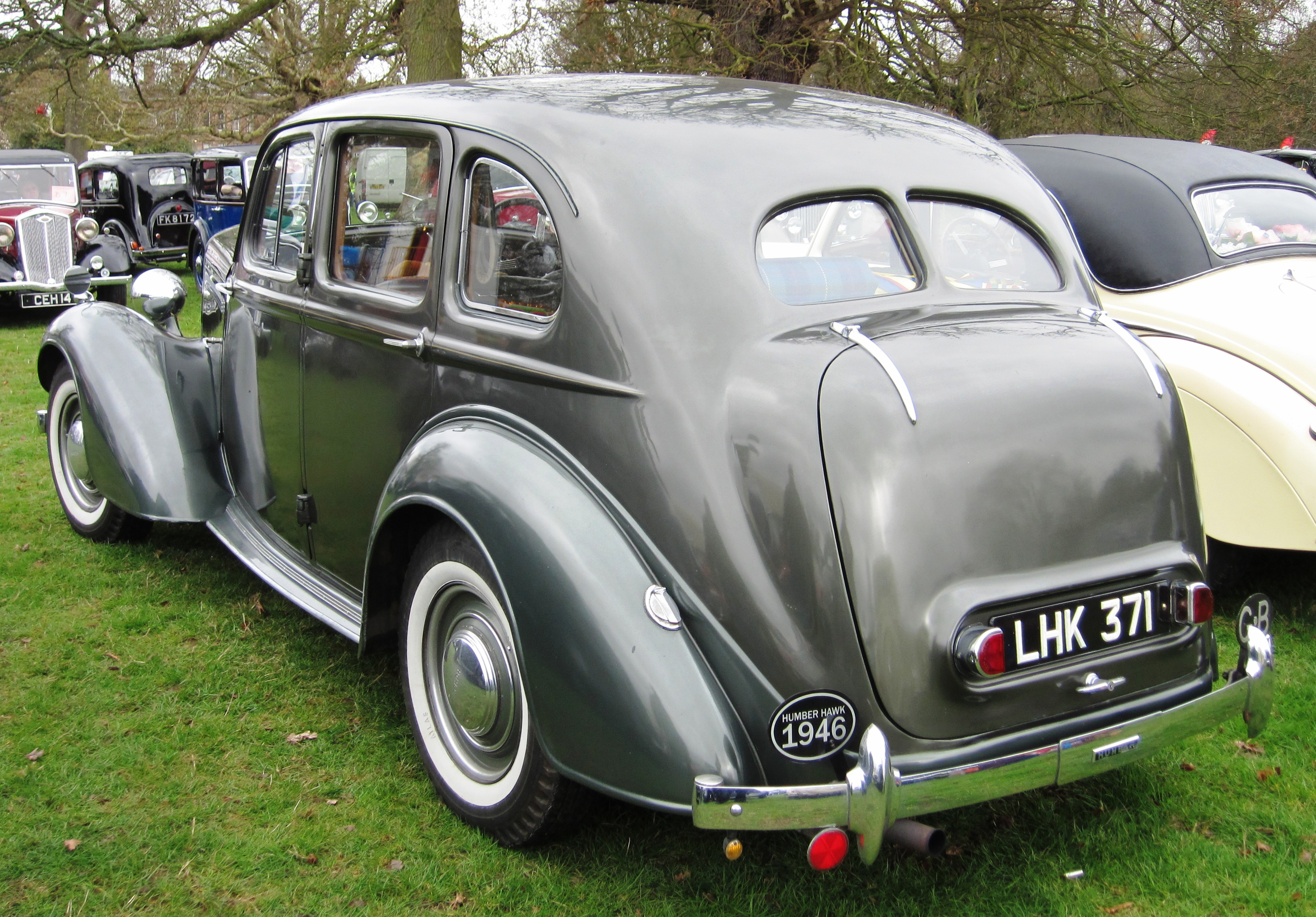
Humber Hawk registered Nov 1946

Hillman Fourteen Humber Hawk Sunbeam-Talbot 2-litre, 90 and Alpine

Overview
- Manufacturer: Hillman

Layout
- Configuration: straight four
- Displacement: 1,943 cc (119 cu in)
- Cylinder bore: 75 mm (3.0 in)
- Piston stroke: 110 mm (4.3 in)
- Valvetrain: side valves

Combustion
- Fuel system: downdraught carburettor, mechanical fuel pump
- Fuel type: petrol
- Cooling system: water, thermostat and impellor

Output
- Power output: 51 bhp (38 kW; 52 PS) @3,600 rpm; Tax horsepower 13.95

Chronology
- Predecessor: Hillman Sixteen
- Successor: Humber Hawk

=== New engine ===
The new engine was a return to the medium-sized simpler and more efficient 4-cylinder type rather than the 6-cylinder engines fashionable earlier in the 1930s. It had been given an oil bath air cleaner and an automatic choke for the downdraught carburettor. The valves were mounted to one side of the block and operated by pushrods. Cooling water was circulated by an impellor and the amount of cooling provided by the radiator was regulated by thermostat. The design, then displacing 1669 cc, was a scaled down version of the Snipe's engine first used in Humber's Twelve of 1933 and now bored out to 75 mm.

The engine, the clutch and the gearbox were mounted together on rubber which allowed them to rock and so absorb vibration. Accordingly the driver's engine controls were provided by cables. Claimed output was 51 bhp at 3,600 rpm. The tax rating was just under 14 horsepower.

The engine continued in the Humber Hawk range and Sunbeam-Talbot and Sunbeam Alpine ranges. Converted for the Sunbeam-Talbot alone to overhead valves from July 1948 it was bored out 6 mm to 2,267 cc for 1951 It continued in side valve form for the Hawk until the summer of 1955 and remained in production for the Hawk until production ended in 1968.

=== Road test ===
Eighteen months after the new car's announcement The Times published a road test. Their motoring correspondent liked the new smooth clean look. He described the car as inexpensive and said it was easy to control and displayed quick power and smoothness. Altogether, he said, there was much to commend though the synchromesh required a short pause before engagement and under certain circumstances braking could affect the steering. The suspension was described as excellent, a rear passenger travelled in comfort without being tossed about on bad surfaces. 50 mph was easily maintained without scurry and 67 mph was the Hillman's mean maximum speed.

Luxury sports saloon variant

At the end of August 1939 it was announced the shape of the Sunbeam-Talbot Ten would be used on the Hillman Fourteen's engine and running gear to make a new car. It was badged Sunbeam-Talbot 2 Litre and was available as a 4-light sports saloon, a 4-seater sports tourer, a drop head foursome coupé and a sports 2-seater. The new coachwork was of steel and ash on a shorter 96 in (2,400 mm) wheelbase and narrower 48 in (1,200 mm) track.

Three days later the United Kingdom declared war on Germany.

In the British Imperial fortress colony of Bermuda, where motor vehicles had famously been banned from the public roads before the First World War (although motor ambulances, fire-engines, and a road works vehicle had been authorised between the wars), even the Police force, the Royal Navy, British Army, and Royal Air Force were not permitted motor vehicles until the Second World War. General Sir Reginald John Thoroton Hildyard, KCB, CMG, DSO, resigned his offices of Governor and General Officer Commanding-in-Chief (GOC-in-C) in 1939 after the House of Assembly of Bermuda twice refused to allow him a motor car. With the declaration of war, however, the legislature soon authorised naval and military vehicles to use the public roads, including cars for both the naval Commander-in-Chief and the Officer Commanding Troops, a Brigadier subordinate to the General Officer Commanding-in-Chief in the command structure of the Bermuda Garrison. A car was also authorised for the Governor, and in December, 1943, Governor Lord Burghley, his wife, and his Aide-de-Campe, Flight Lieutenant L. S. Litchfield, RAF, each obtained a Bermudian driving licence in order to drive the car obtained for the use of the Governor, a Hillman 14.
