= Hillman 16 =

Hillman Wizard 65; Hillman 16
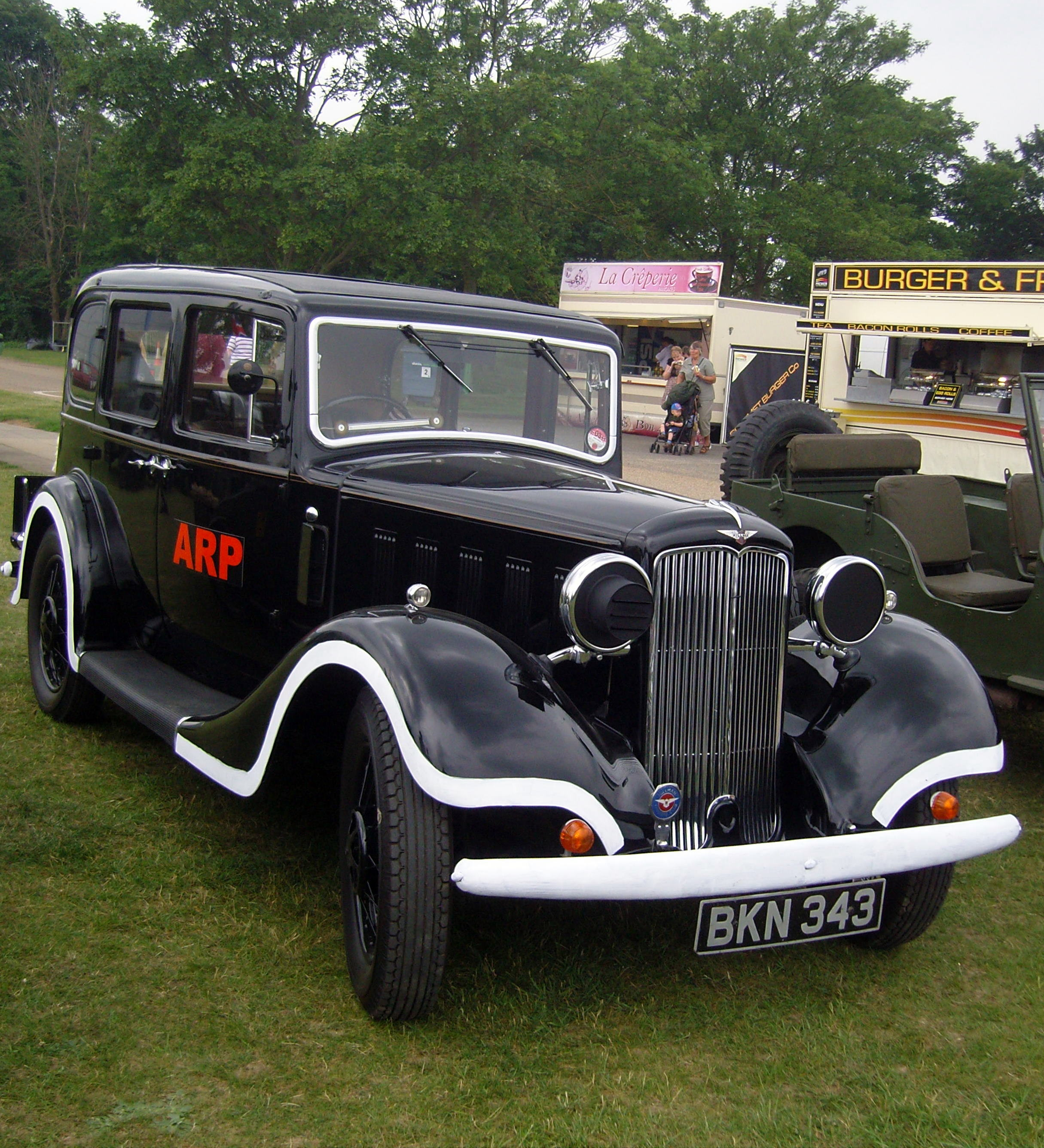
- Hillman Sixteen in ARP Warden livery first registered January 1935

Overview
- Manufacturer: Hillman Motor Car Co Ltd
- Production: 1934-1937

Body and chassis
- Body style: chassis only; family saloon; de luxe saloon; sports saloon; foursome drophead coupé; Wingham cabriolet; 5-seater tourer

Powertrain
- Engine: 2,110 cc (128.8 cu in); 2,576 cc (157.2 cu in)

Dimensions
- Wheelbase: 108.5 in (2,760 mm); 111 in (2,800 mm)

Chronology
- Predecessor: Hillman 14
- Successor: Hillman 14; Humber 16

Layout
- Configuration: Straight 6-cylinder
- Displacement: 1,496 cc (91.3 cu in)
- Cylinder bore: 61.25 mm (2.41 in)
- Piston stroke: 84.63 mm (3.33 in)

Output
- Power output: 24 bhp (18 kW; 24 PS) @2,400 rpm; Tax horsepower 13.96

The Hillman 16 was a series of 16 horsepower (RAC rating) medium priced 5-seater executive cars made by Hillman during the 1930s by installing a smaller engine in their 20-horsepower Hillman 20 range.

They were replaced by Hillman's 14 which changed its name between 1939 and 1945 to Humber Hawk.

== Hillman 16 ==
From 1934 Hillman made a pair of larger 6 cylinder side-valve saloon cars with two sizes of otherwise identical engines in identical bodies for the same price: this 16 horsepower car and a 20-horsepower version Hillman advertised the cars as having "Cushioned Power" mounts which helped stop vibration through the engine and gearbox and described their cars as being “built with a margin throughout”. These two models drew on some of the features and engine designs of the luxury Humber cars, including the Humber 12, 16/50, Snipe and Pullman, that were also being built under Rootes brothers control. This was an attempt by Hillman Ltd to enter the low end of the executive car market

=== Engines, seating and brakes ===
The Hillman 16 had a 2110 cc 15.90 hp side valve straight-six engine whilst the matching 20/70 had larger 2810 cc 20.9 hp engines. The "16hp" and “20/70” saloons were five seaters with bucket seats at the front and a folding armrest dividing a bench seat at the rear. All these vehicles had Bendix "Duo Servo" brakes, which used rod and cable linkages and operated on all four wheels via both the foot pedal and the handbrake lever.

== New body, bigger 16 horsepower engine ==
A new streamlined body was announced in October 1935 and the engine was enlarged 22 per cent by lengthening its stroke by 14 mm. Although the cubic capacity was raised from 2110 cc to 2576 cc this did not affect the car's tax rating because the RAC formula takes no account of an engine's stroke.

=== Production ===
In contrast to Hillman 16s, around 4100 Hillman 20/70s and Hawks were built during the same period.

=== Survivors ===
Only a few examples of each model still exist in the UK today. Some of these vehicles were exported throughout the world, including Argentina, Australia, Greece and New Zealand where a number of "20/70"'s also still survive.
