= Singer Eleven =

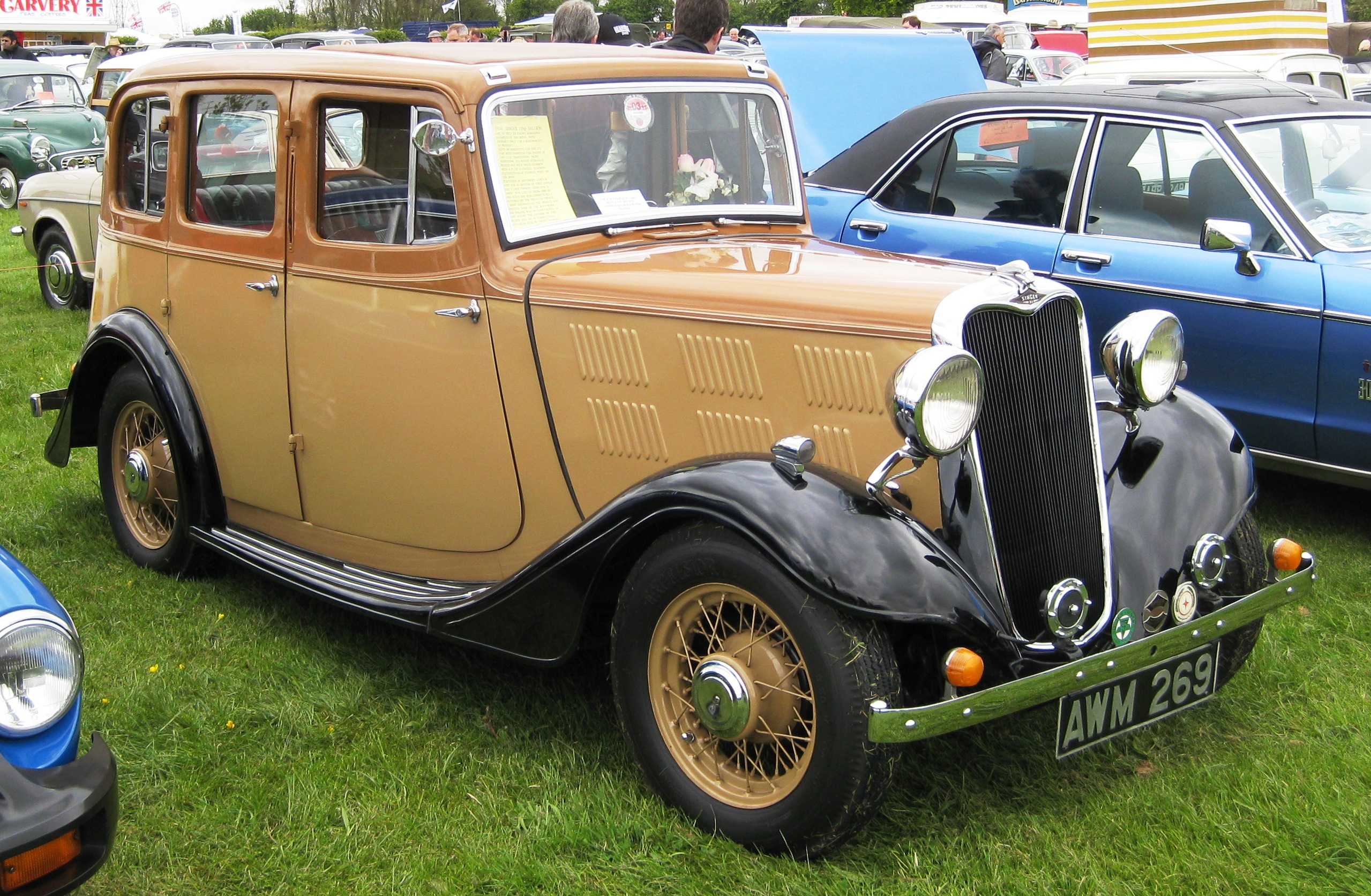

Overview
- Manufacturer: Singer Motors
- Production: 1934-1937
- Assembly: Coventry

Body and chassis
- Body style: 4-door saloon

Powertrain
- Engine: 1,394 cc (85 cu in)

Dimensions
- Wheelbase: 8 ft 4 in (2.54 m)
- Length: 13 ft 4 in (4.06 m)
- Width: 4 ft 11 in (1.50 m)
- Height: 5 ft 4.5 in (1.64 m)
- Kerb weight: 980 kg (2,161 lb)

The Singer Eleven is a British motorcar produced in Coventry from 1934 by Singer Motors.

== Technical details ==
The Eleven is powered by 1394 cc 4-cylinder overhead cam engine producing 36.7 bhp (27 kW; 37 PS) and produced a top speed of 65.2 mph (104.9 km/h).

The car's transmission was called Fluidrive and featured a Vulcan-Sinclair Fluid coupling and was unusual in featuring independent front suspension.

The standard factory coachwork was a four-door saloon with a 8 ft 4 in (2.54 m) wheelbase, launched at £240, with alternative aerodynamic bodies produced by Airstream of London. Only two of this specific model survive with one being in New Zealand and the other being on display at the Caister Castle Car Collection in Norfolk.

For 1935, a larger 1459 cc 4-cylinder overhead cam engine was available in the Special Sport saloon including features such as a rev counter and clock but lost the Fluidrive for a four-speed manual transmission with synchromesh.

Production of the Eleven ended in 1936.
