= George E. Stanley =

British motorcyclist

George Enoch Stanley (1884–1949) was a British motorcyclist who was a member of ‘The British Motorcycle Racing Club’.

== History ==
From 1909 to 1911 he rode a Premier motorcycle then from 1911 to 1914 he rode a three and a half horsepower single cylinder Singer motorcycle and lastly he rode a Triumph. George broke the one-hour record at Brooklands race track on a Singer motorcycle in 1912, becoming the first ever rider of a 350 cc motorcycle to cover over 60 miles (97 km) in an hour. George was born in Wolverhampton, England in 1884 and died on 4 June 1949 in a cemetery in Beddgelert. George had four children named Kenneth, Victor, Graham, Roy and his second wife called Kate. His father was Enoch Stanley and George's uncle was William Stanley who set up the English football team, Coventry City. George’s nickname was ‘The Wizard’.

In 1913, there was a short newspaper article about him, it read: "George E. Stanley, Engineer, in Wolver-Hampton. - Probably- the most outstanding rider in years just preceding the war, Stanley, will long be remembered as ‘The Wizard’. By super-tuning and brilliant riding he was one of the most successful riders of 1910-1913 periods, His 350cc hour record (63.39 mph) on a Singer stood from October, 1913, to November 1920, and his 500cc hour record (72.48 mph), also on a Singer, from October 1920. He entered the competition world on a Premier".

After motorcycling career, George was a consultant of Singer and a designer. After retiring from consultancy, he moved to Beddgelert in Wales where he met Kate.

== Races won ==
- Distance of 56 miles in one Hour
- Covered a distance of 60 miles and winning the third One Hour Senior
- Covered a distance of 5 miles in 4.34 minutes

1912

- Brooklands Meeting - 2nd
- Brooklands Meeting - 1st
- Brooklands Time Trials - 1st
- Brooklands Time Trials - 1st
- Brooklands Three Lap Scratch Race - 2nd
- Brooklands Meeting - 2nd
- Brooklands Third Meeting - 1st
- Brooklands Flying Mile - 1st
- Brooklands Car Challenge Race - 1st
- Brooklands Meeting - Eighth Short Handicap - 3rd
- Invitation Race - 2nd
- All Comers Race - 1st
- Eight Long Motorcycle Race - 2nd
- Brooklands Flying Kilometre - 2nd
- Brooklands Flying Mile - 2nd
- Brooklands Junior Scratch Race - 1st
- Brooklands Senior Scratch Race - 1st
- Coventry Club's Open Hill Climb - 1st
- Coventry Club's Open Hill Climb - 1st. on time

- 1st. on form

- Coventry Club's Open Hill Climb - 1st. on time
- Coventry Club's Open Hill Climb - 1st. on form
- Brooklands Junior Hour Race - 1st

1913

- Brooklands 3 Lap Scratch - 1st
- Brooklands 3 Lap Scratch - 1st
- Brooklands 3 Lap Handicap - 1st
- Brooklands 3 Lap Handicap - 3rd
- Senior Lap TT - 1st
- Brooklands Time Trials - 1st
- 22 Lap Junior TT - 1st
- 26 Lap Senior TT - 1st
- 3 Lap Scratch - 1st
- 3 Lap Scratch - 1st
- 3 Lap Handicap - 1st
- 3 Lap Hindicap - 1st
- The Daily Express Motorcycle Benzol Race - 1st
- 10 Mile Record Race and Sealed Handicap - 1st
- Junior One Lap Sprint Race - 1st
- Five Lap A.C.U. Championship Race - 3rd
- Junior One Hour A.C.U. Championship Race - 1st

== World records held ==
Class "B":

- Flying 5 Miles
- Standard 10 Miles
- 50 Miles
- One Hour

Class "C":

- Flying Kilometers
- Flying Mile
- Flying 5 Miles
- Standard 10 Miles
- 50 Miles
- One Hour

Class "C":

- Flying Kilometre
- Flying Mile
- Flying 5 Miles
- Standard 10 Miles
- 50 Miles
- One Hour

== See also ==
- Brooklands
- Premier Motorcycles
- Triumph Motorcycles
