= Singer Motors =

British motor vehicle manufacturer

Singer Motors Limited
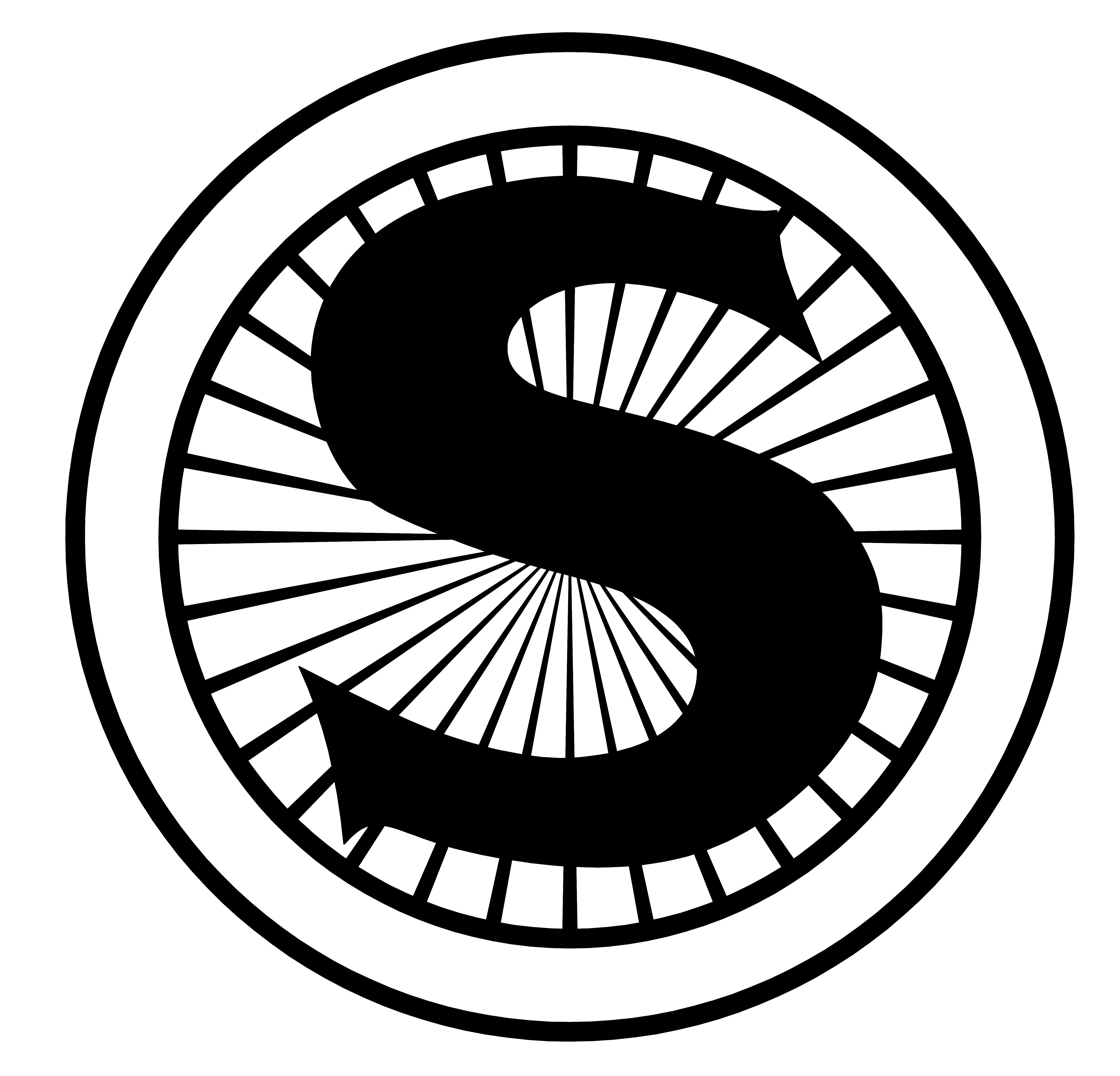
- Type: Private
- Industry: Automobile industry Motorcycle until 1915; Bicycle industry until 1915
- Founded: 1875
- Founder: George Singer
- Defunct: 1970
- Fate: Taken over, Discontinued
- Successor: Rootes Group
- Headquarters: Coventry, United Kingdom
- Area served: United Kingdom; Commonwealth of Nations
- Products: Automobiles; Motorcycles until 1915; Bicycles until 1915

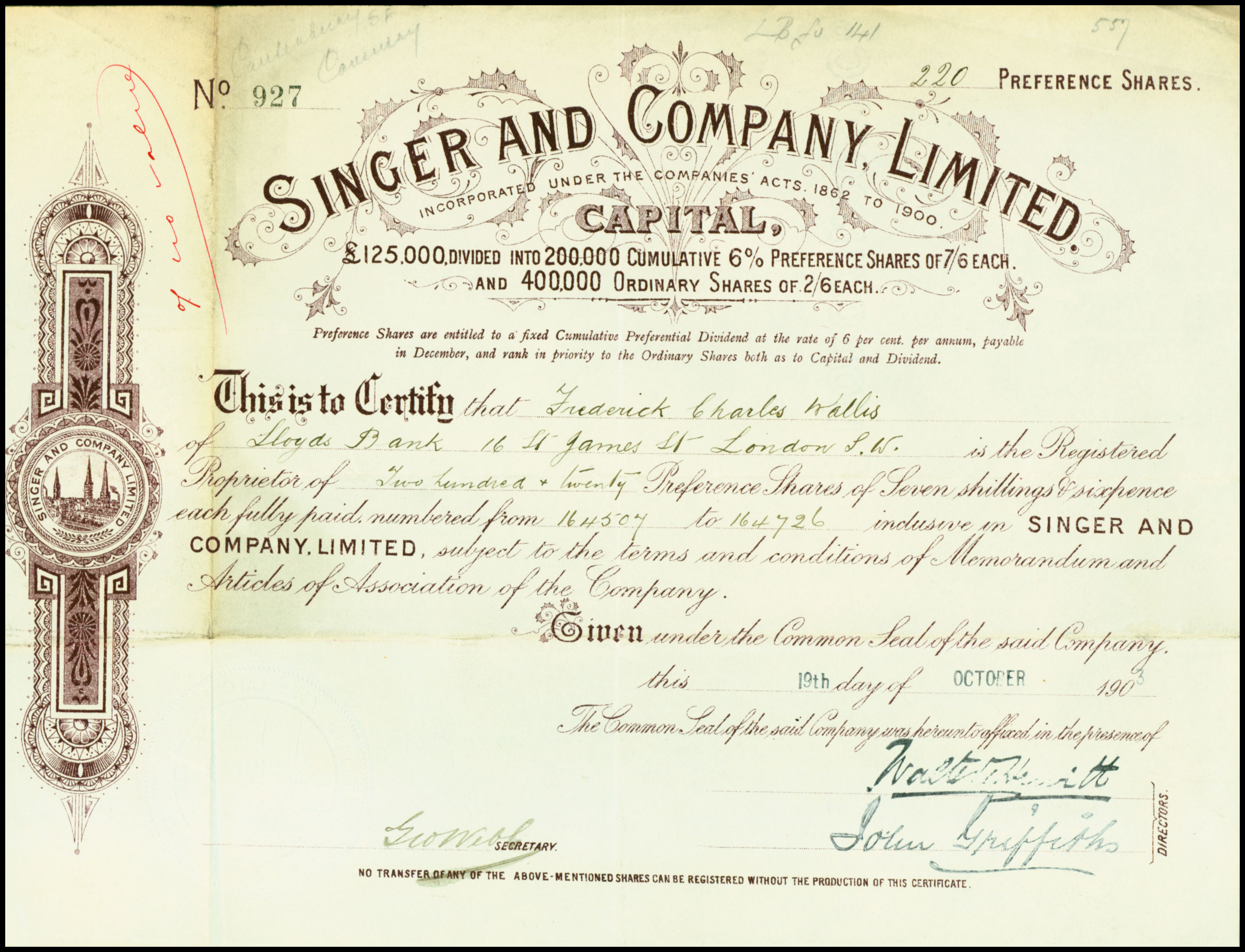
Preferred Share of the Singer and Company Ltd, issued 19. October 1903

Singer Motors Limited was a British motor vehicle manufacturing business, originally a bicycle manufacturer founded as Singer & Co by George Singer, in 1874 in Coventry, England. Singer & Co's bicycle manufacture continued. From 1901 George Singer's Singer Motor Co made cars and commercial vehicles.

Singer Motor Co was the first motor manufacturer to make a small economy car that was a replica of a large car, showing a small car was a practical proposition. It was much more sturdily built than otherwise similar cyclecars. With its four-cylinder ten horsepower engine the Singer Ten was launched at the 1912 Cycle and Motor Cycle Show at Olympia. William Rootes, a Singer apprentice at the time of its development and consummate car-salesman, contracted to buy 50, the entire first year's supply. It became a best-seller. Ultimately, Singer's business was acquired by his Rootes Group in 1956, which continued the brand until 1970, a few years following Rootes' acquisition by the American Chrysler corporation.

== History ==
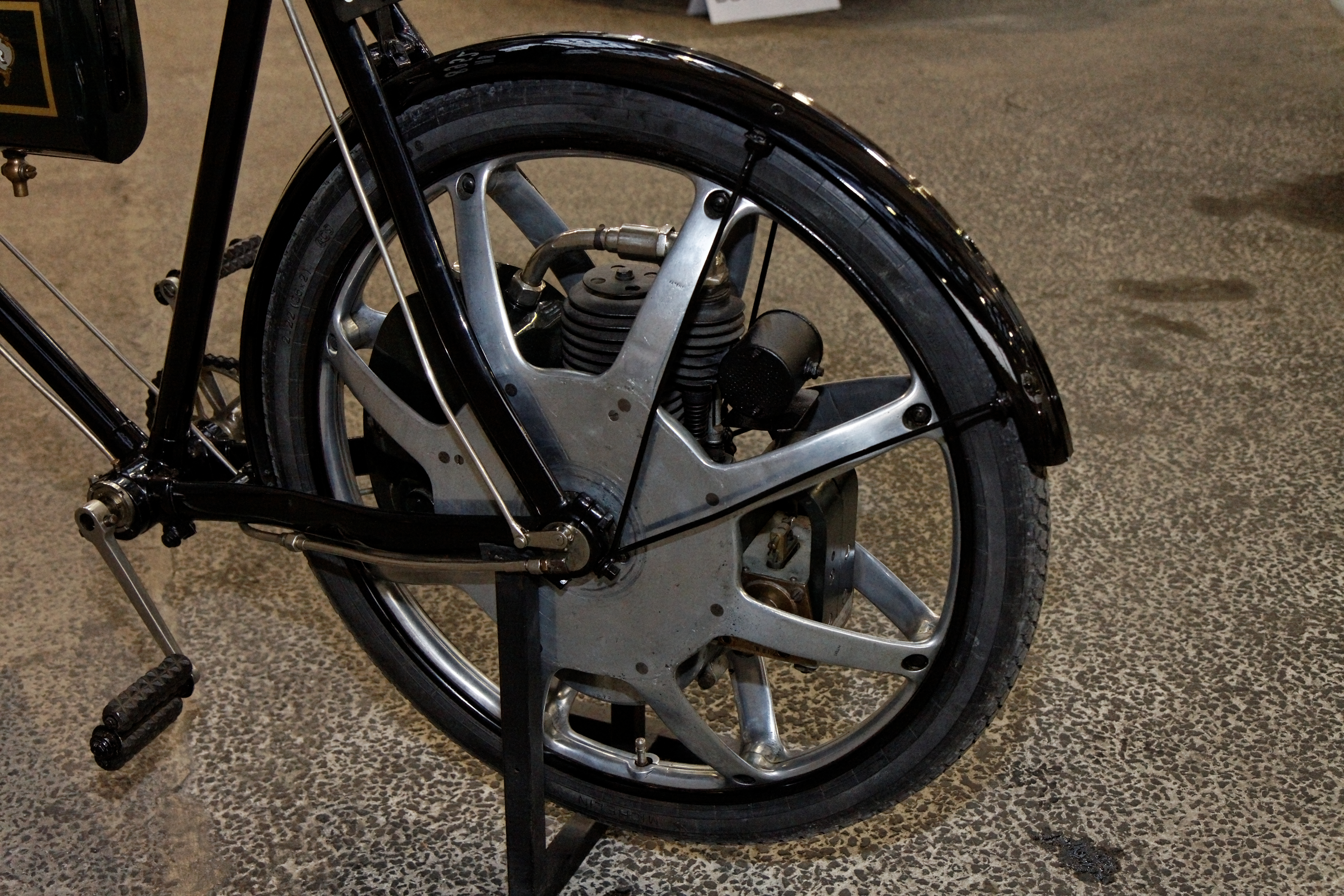
Singer bicycle with motorwheel

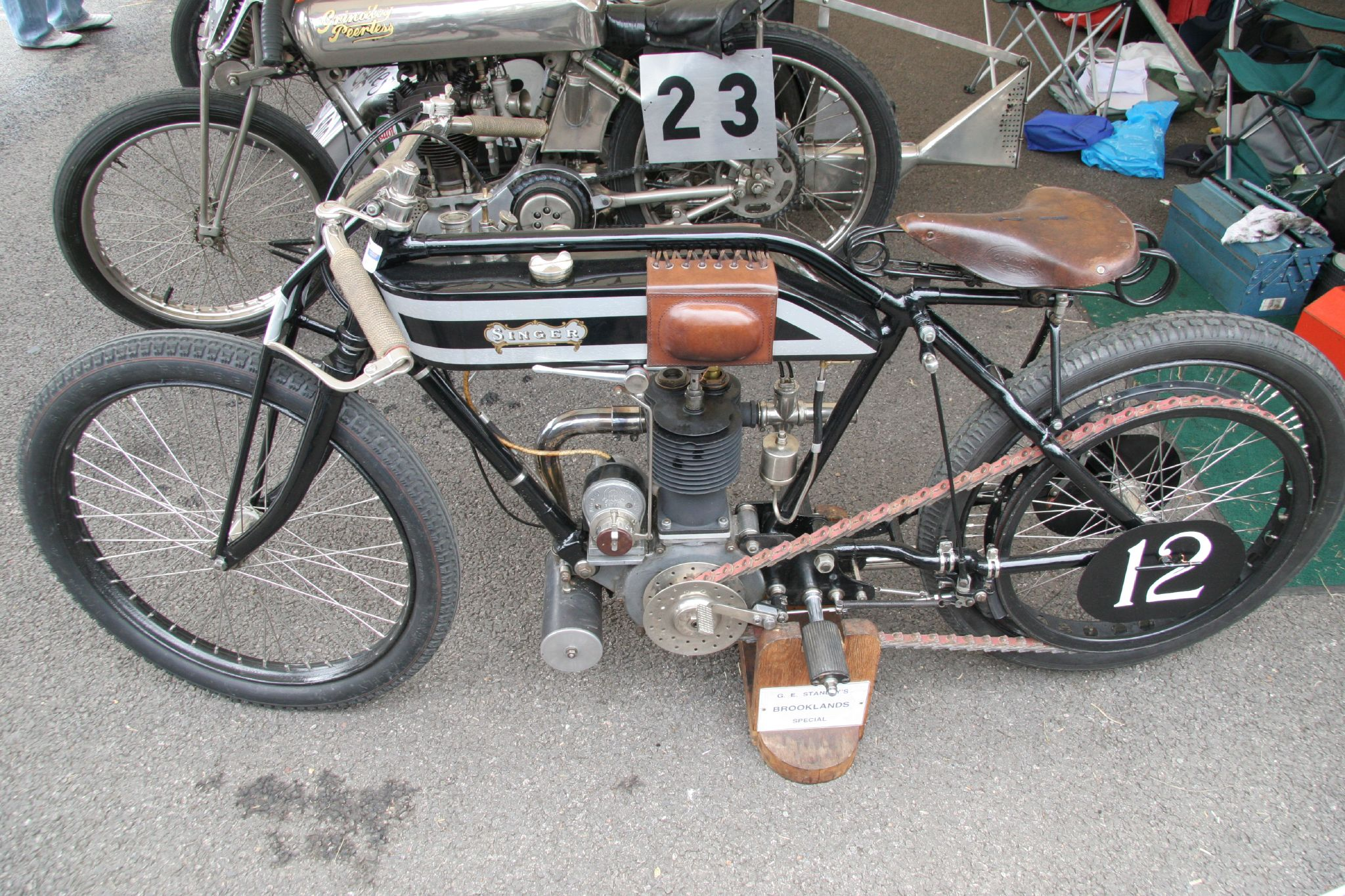
Singer motorcycle

=== Bicycles ===
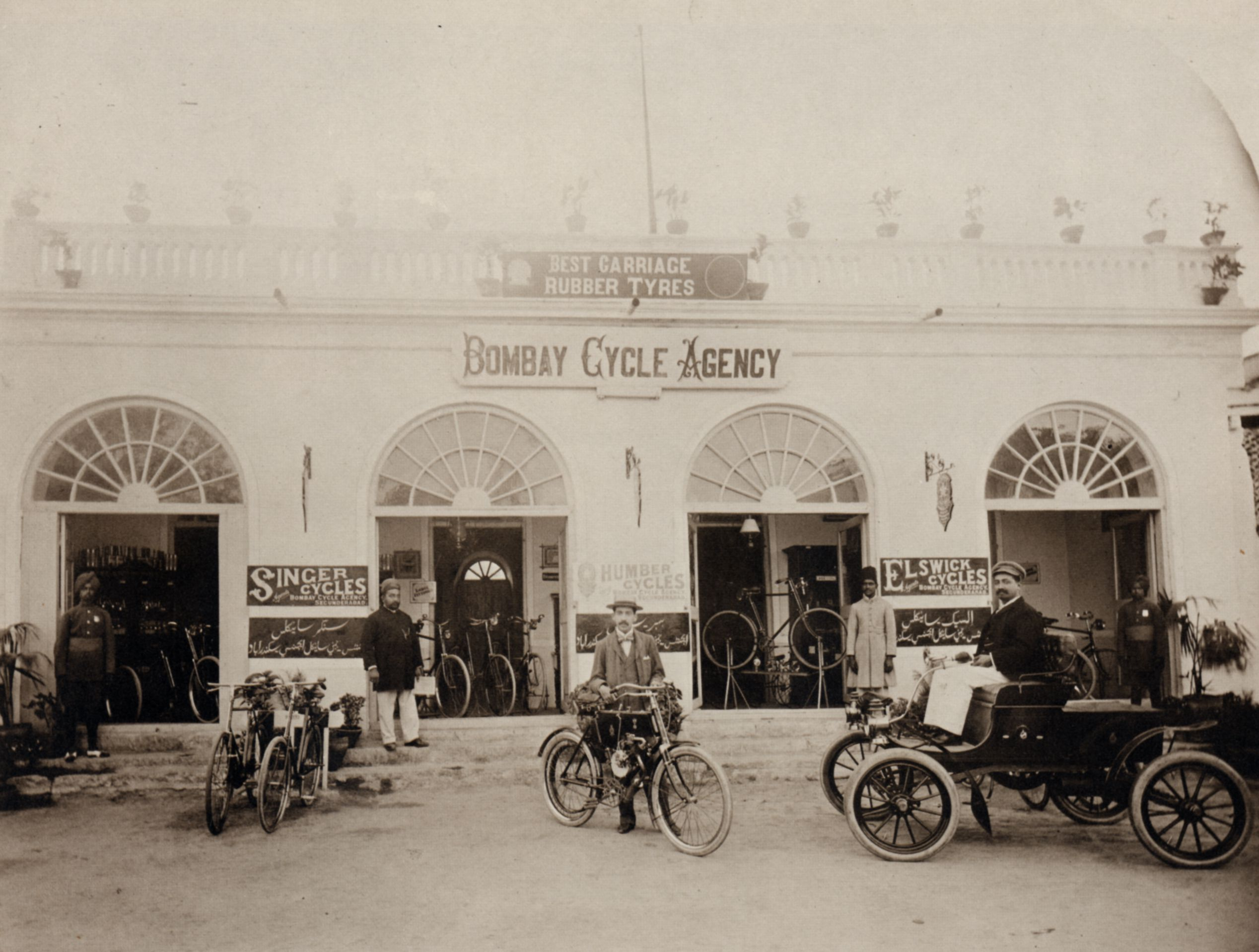
A dealer of Singer cycles in Secunderabad in 1904

George Singer began his bicycle-making business in Coventry in 1874. At the time, he was foreman of the Coventry Sewing Machine Company, from which he resigned. He was joined in the business by J. E. Stringer, his brother-in-law. It appears Singer was inspired to produce a bicycle safer than the Ordinary (penny-farthing) type standard at the time, by cyclist George Dominy. Singer did not alter the large front and small rear wheel design of the Ordinary, but by raking the front forks (a first) did make it safer. He patented the design on 24 October 1878.

He followed this with an 1879 model having a large rear wheel and small front wheels which could be folded aside. and in 1885 with a tricycle, rear wheels driven by chain, which also featured a handbrake (designed by Singer and his associate, R. H. Lea) on the rear axle.

In about 1888, Singer introduced the Rational, a diamond-framed model with wheels the same size, each about 30 in (76 cm) diameter. It also offered removable handlebars and removable rear wheel. While safer, its performance suffered. Nevertheless, it proved popular with cycle tourers.

In 1895, Singer Cycle faced a £600,000 "floatation by that egregious company promoter" Terah Hooley, but survived. It also weathered an industry slump in 1898 that wiped out many British bicycle makers.

Singer Cycle Company began producing motor cars in 1901.

=== Engines, three-wheelers and motorcycles ===
Part of Singer & Company Directors' Report, 31 July 1917. The chairman then was Arthur Edward Jagger, other directors were William Edward Bullock and Arthur Charles Bourner, who was a partner of the largest chartered accountancy firm of the Potteries.

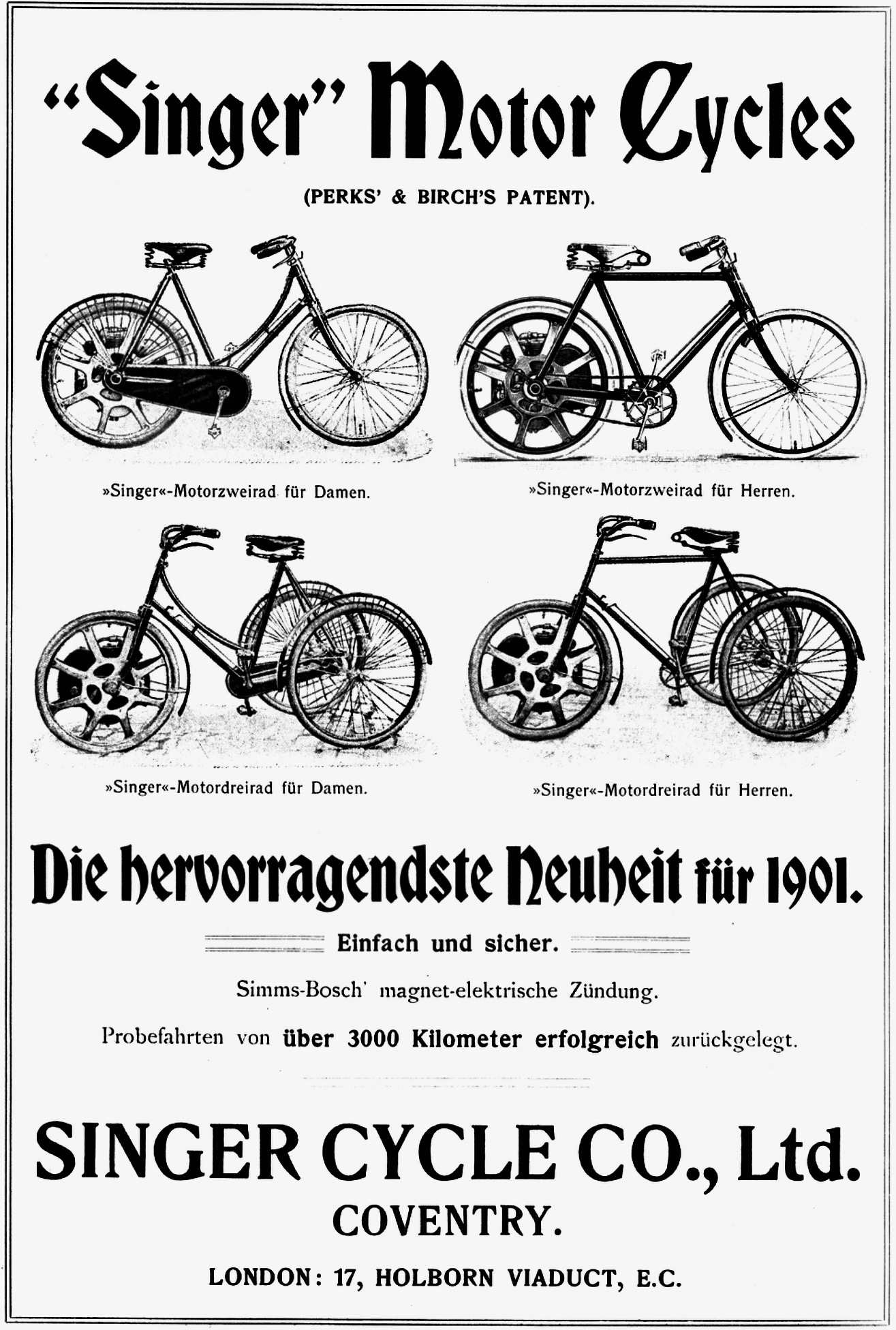
Singer Cycle Company advertisement (1900)

Singer Cycle began motor vehicle production in 1901, purchasing the manufacturing rights to the Perks & Birch Motor Wheel, a one-cylinder engine contained in a spoked aluminium wheel, known as a motorwheel. It was a 222 cc (13.5 cu in) four-stroke designed by former Beeston employees Edwin Perks and Frank Birch. A unique feature was that the engine, fuel tank, carburettor and low-tension magneto were all housed in a two-sided cast alloy spoked wheel. It was probably the first motor bicycle to be provided with magneto ignition. It was perhaps the only motorcycle engine of its era with reliable ignition. These were fitted to bicycles. The design was used by Singer & Co in the rear wheel and then the front wheel of a trike.

In 1904, he developed a range of more conventional motorcycles which included 346 cc two strokes and, from 1911, side-valve models of 299 cc and 535 cc. In 1913 Singer & Co offered an open-frame ladies model.

Singer & Co stopped building motorcycles at the outbreak of the First World War.

=== Motorcycle racing ===
In 1909, Singer & Co built a series of racers and roadsters and entered several bikes in races, including the Isle of Man Senior TT in 1914. George E. Stanley broke the one-hour record at Brooklands race track on a Singer motorcycle in 1912, becoming the first ever rider of a 350 cc motorcycle to cover over 60 miles (97 km) in an hour.

=== Motor cars ===
Singer's first tricar was the Tri-Voiturette. It was powered by a 2 1/2 hp (1.9 kW) engine, and offered in two models, the No. 1 (passenger facing backward) and No. 2 (passenger facing forward); both fitted the passenger seat well behind the rear axle.

At the 1902 Cordingly Show, at the Islington Agricultural Hall, Singer showed two commercial variants of the Tri-Voiturette, the Motor Carrier, one for tradesmen, one for dairymen.

The Tri-Voiturette was replaced by another tricar, which had two front wheels and a driven rear, more horsepower, and a coachbuilt body, but with the passenger now in front of the driver.

Muriel Hind drove a Singer Tricar in the 1906 Land's End to John O'Groats Trial, with aviation pioneer Hilda Hewlett as her passenger and mechanic. She also drove a tricar in the twenty four hour London to Edinburgh Trial, again with a female passenger, making good time in torrential rain.

The first Singer-designed car was the 4-cylinder 2.4-litre 12/14 of 1906. The engine was bought in from Aster.

Singer made their first four-wheel car in 1905. It was designed by Scottish engineer Alexander Craig and was a variant of a design he had done for Lea-Francis having a 2-cylinder 1,853 or 2,471 cc (113.1 or 150.8 cu in) engine.

The Craig engine was replaced in 1906 by White & Poppe engines in Singer's two light car models. These were a 7 hp (5.2 kW) twin and a 12/14 four-cylinder. These were joined by a White & Poppe-engined Doctor's Brougham and two Auster-powered tourers, a 12/14 and a 20/22.

For 1907, the Lea-Francis design was dropped and a range of two-, three- and four-cylinder models was launched, using White and Poppe engines. The Aster engined models were dropped in 1909 and a new range of larger cars introduced. All cars were now White and Poppe powered.

Singer experimented with a cyclecar, powered by a transversely-mounted aircooled engine in 1911–12. Instead, the company built a light car, the Ten, which debuted in 1912 with a 10 hp (7.5 kW) 1,096 cc (66.9 cu in) four-cylinder engine; its main drawback was a three-speed transmission built into the rear axle. The Ten was the company's first big seller. The same year, two years after George Singer's death, the "bicycle wheel" radiator emblem was deleted. That year's primary product was a 16/20, powered by a White & Poppe engine.

The use of their own power plants spread through the range until by the outbreak of the First World War all models except the low-volume 3.3-litre 20 hp were so equipped.

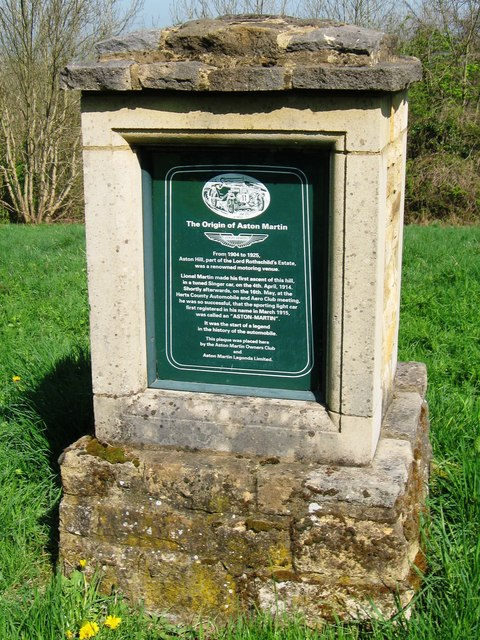
Plaque describing Singer's part in the origin of Aston-Martin

The Ten's performance attracted interest from former racing cyclist Lionel Martin, who bought a copy right off Singer's stand at the 1912 Olympia Motor Show. Martin gave the car a thorough going-over, improving the engine's power and raising the top speed from 40 to 70 mph (64 to 113 km/h). Martin set up shop in Henniker Mews, Kensington, England, tuning the four-cylinder cars, and did a robust business. This was aided by the motor racing success of Martin's own improved Ten, in particular at the Aston Clinton hillclimb. The Ten would also be sold by William Rootes, former Singer apprentice turned dealer.

On 11 July 1914, Beatrice Blore drove a Singer Ten car up the cable track (with a gradient of 1 in 3 in places) of the Great Orme, in Llandudno, North Wales, becoming the first woman to drive up the steep and challenging headland. She was six months pregnant at the time and the drive was a publicity stunt developed by her partner George Wilkin Browne to help sell the cars at his Llandudno garage, North Wales Silver Motors. The cars were advertised for sale for £195.

Production was suspended for the First World War, then resumed afterward. Except for detail changes, the engine remained the same until the Ten ended production in 1923; the chassis was redesigned in 1921. The two-seater was priced at £395.

In 1921, Singer purchased motorcycle and cyclecar maker Coventry Premier, selling a four-wheeler of their design, powered by a 1,005 cc (61.3 cu in) water-cooled V-twin, for £250, under that name until 1924. The engine was changed to a four-cylinder Singer in 1922, but the car ceased production in 1923.

In 1922, Singer's first six-cylinder was a 1,999 cc (122.0 cu in) of 15 hp (11 kW), with a dated fixed head. This new 15 used a chassis very similar to the 10's, and had one interesting feature, a retractable luggage rack. In 1924, the 15 was offered with a Weymann fabric body. Sales of the 15 were "modest".

The 10's engine was converted to overhead valves in 1923 and monobloc, while the next year, the Ten also got a Weymann body option.

The new 10/26 replaced the older 10 in 1924. it offered a 1,308 cc (79.8 cu in) engine and modernized styling. It was offered in several models, from the £195 four-seat Popular to the £295 Saloon Limousine Del Luxe.

At the 1926 London Motor Show, the company debuted the Junior, powered by a 16.5 hp (12.3 kW) OHV 848 cc (51.7 cu in). Priced from £148 10s as a four-seat tourer, it had only rear-wheel brakes to start. A racing 10 set the Brooklands lap record in 1921 at 74.42 mph (119.77 km/h). Meanwhile, the 10/26 became the 1,308 cc (79.8 cu in)-engined Senior, joined by the new Six, powered by a 1,776 cc (108.4 cu in) inline six based on the 10/26's and four-wheel servo-assisted brakes from Clayton Dewandre. The same year, Singer took over Calcott Brothers.

In the 1920s, Singer sales climbed steadily, By 1928, Singer was Britain's third largest car maker after Austin and Morris. Singer, restricted by a built-in site, acquired other companies for factory space. In 1926, they made 9,000 cars. In 1929, with seven factories and 8,000 employees, they produced 28,000 cars, though having just 15% they trailed far behind Austin and Morris which shared 60% of the market. Hampered by their new acquisitions, the cost of new machinery and a moving assembly line in their latest acquisition, Singer's offerings were eclipsed by new models from Austin, Morris, and Hillman; from 1932, these were joined by the new Ford Model Y.

The Senior would be redesigned in 1928, with capacity increased to 1,571 cc (95.9 cu in) and an additional crankshaft main bearing added (up from two to three). And, like the Junior and Six, the track was increased. One other model was a fabric-bodied convertible saloon, the Sun.

The redesign left Singer with a few hundred older chassis, which the company bodied and sold as Deliverys, at £180.

Toward the end of the year, a privateer ran a two-seat Junior up Porlock Hill one hundred times in fifteen hours, which moved Singer to rename that model the Porlock.

In 1929, a 2+2 on the Junior chassis appeared, and the Senior disappeared, while the Six gained a 1,792 cc (109.4 cu in) sidevalve. This was joined by a Super Six, with a 1,921 cc (117.2 cu in) OHV and four-speed manual transmission. This was, said The Autocar, "the most impressive Singer yet"

The 8 hp (6.0 kW) 848 cc (51.7 cu in) Junior of 1931, with styling resembling the top-priced saloon and a "waterfall" grille, which lent the car its common name. The range continued in a very complex manner using developments of the ohc Junior engine, with an 848 cc (51.7 cu in), the Ten, the sidevalve 1,476 cc (90.1 cu in) 12/6, the sidevalve 18/6 (now 2,041 cc (124.5 cu in)), and the OHV Silent-Six (now 2,180 cc (133 cu in)). At the top of the price range was the £480 Charles Frederick ‘C F’ Beauvais-designed Kaye Don saloon, built on the Silent-Six platform. Hydraulic brakes were standard, except for the Kaye Don, which relied on servo-boosted Dewandre brakes. A sliding sunshine roof was also available.

In 1932, Leo J. Shorter became chief engineer (by 1940, technical director). He and two other designers created the new Sports Nine Sports, which made its debut at the London Motor Show that same year; it featured a two-bearing crankshaft engine of 972cc, which gave the car its name. Owing to manufacturing difficulties of the new bodywork, the "9" engine was fitted to a number of Junior chassis' as a stopgap until the production cars were ready, which gave rise to the incredibly rare "Junior-Nine". The production numbers are unknown, and only 8 are known to have survived. And in 1933, The Nine was joined by a new 14 hp (10 kW) six-cylinder, a 1.5 Horsepower six-cylinder, and a 2-Liter six-cylinder, while the Junior was dropped and the new sidevalve-engined 12 displaced the Ten. The Sports Nine was "an immediate success" among trials racers, and Singer entered a specially-prepared version at Le Mans, which led to the Nine being commonly called the Le Mans. Singer earned an "excellent reputation" in racing before three works Nines appeared at the 1935 Ulster Tourist Trophy, where all three wrecked, all from the same cause (steering failure) and all, incredibly, at the same spot. All the drivers literally walked away unscathed, but Singer's reputation in racing was beyond repair.

In summer 1934, the Eleven was launched and was very innovative in its class by including the clutch-less "Fluidrive" Fluid coupling and Independent front suspension, and was also offered with "aerodynamic" Airstream coachwork; the name was given independent of the Chrysler.

Independent front suspension was added to the Nine in 1935, while the larger models got Fluidrive transmissions. The new two litre Sixteen debuted that year as well, also with IFS. The Nine became the Bantam in 1935, which also debuted at the London Motor Show; it was a close copy of the Ford Model Y (a popular subject for copying), with two-bearing crankshafts and a 972 cc (59.3 cu in) engine; this, and its high £127 pricetag, made it uncompetitive. It had a two-bearing crankshaft and was the first Singer with a synchromesh gearbox, albeit with only three forward gears. Continuing decline in sales led to financial trouble, and Singer attempted to cut costs, such as by switching back to mechanical brakes on the Nine in 1939.

In May 1936, W. E. Bullock, who had been managing director from 1919 together with his son, general manager from 1931, resigned following criticism from the shareholders at their annual general meeting. No longer viable, Singer & Co Limited was dissolved in December 1936 and what had been its business was transferred to a new company, Singer Motors Limited.

In 1938, the three-bearing 9 hp (6.7 kW) OHC engine of 1,074 cc (65.5 cu in) was introduced, the three speed gearbox only had synchro between 2nd and top.

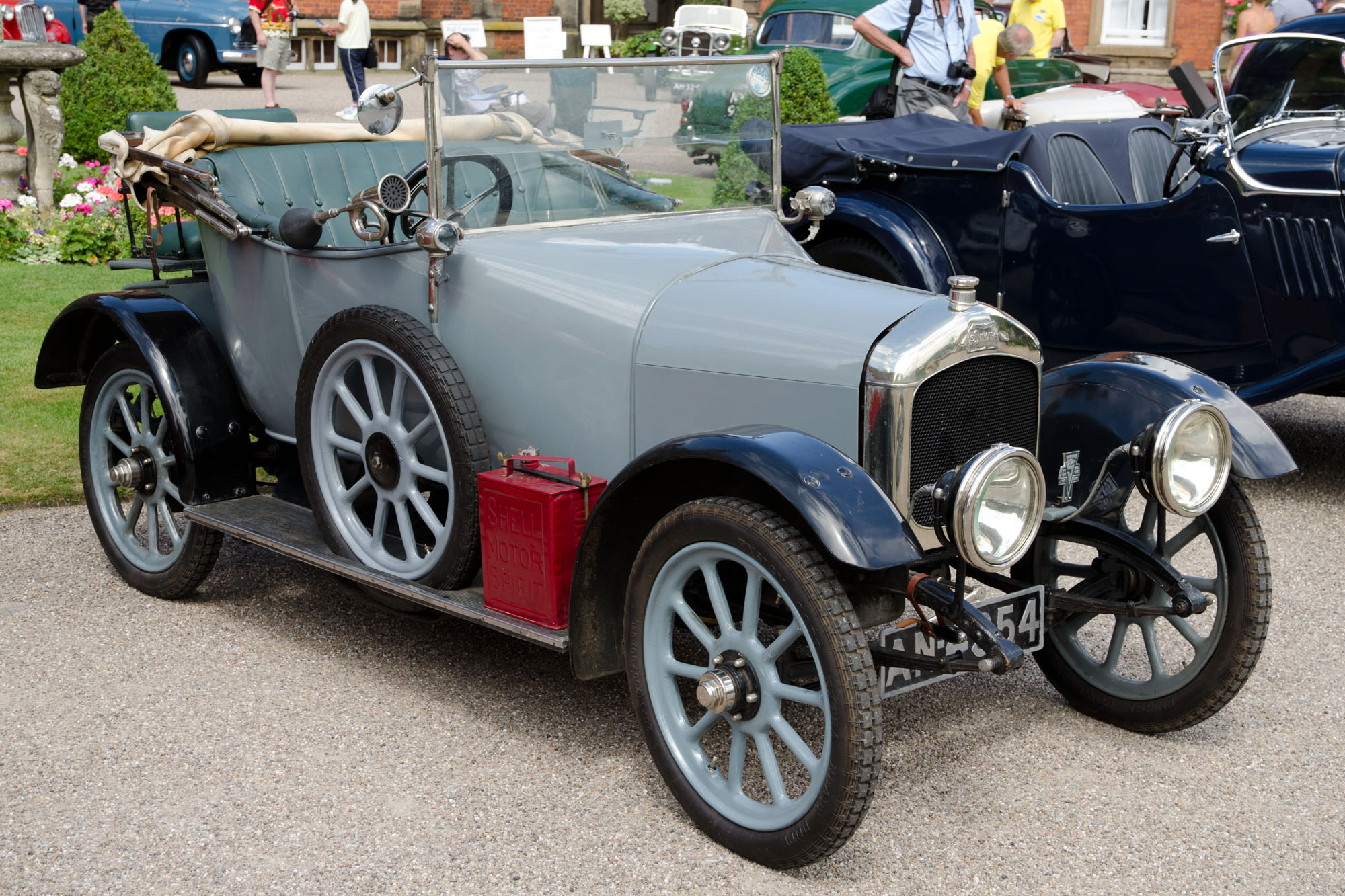
1919 Ten

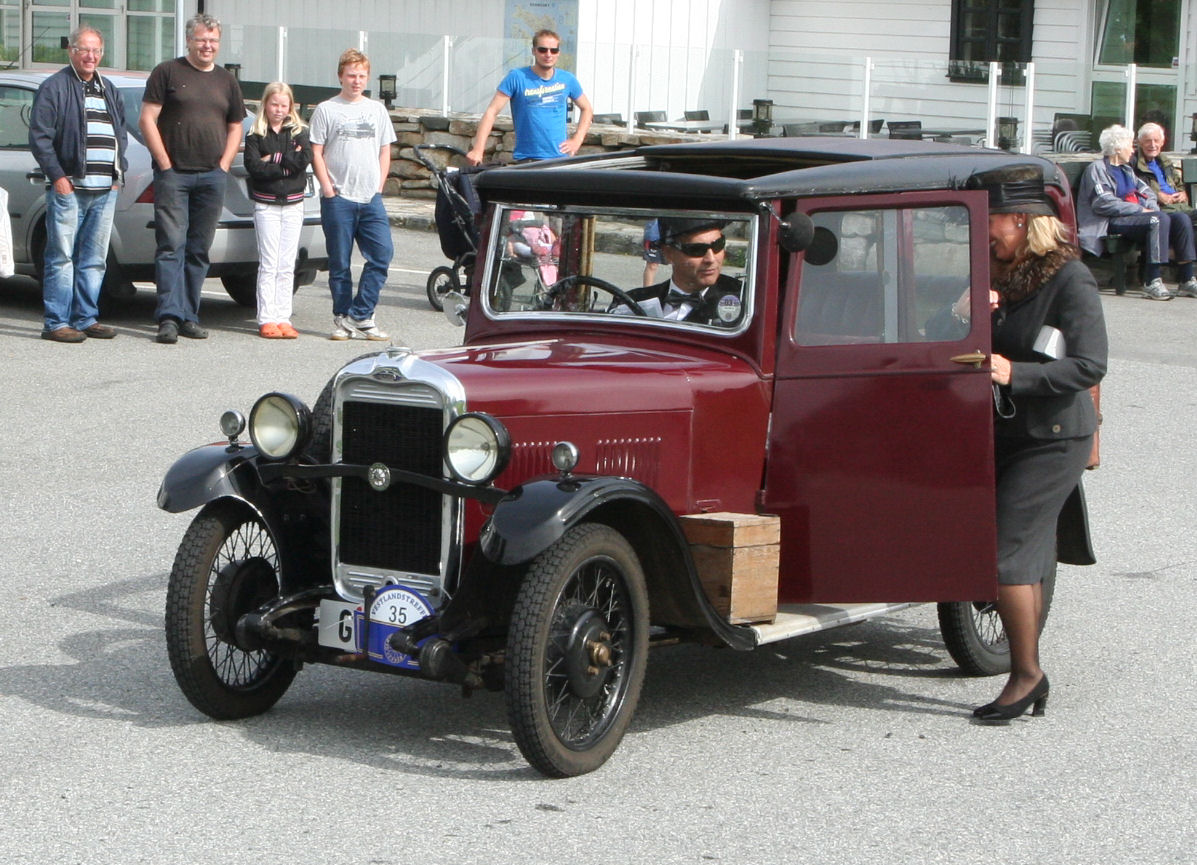
1927 Junior 8

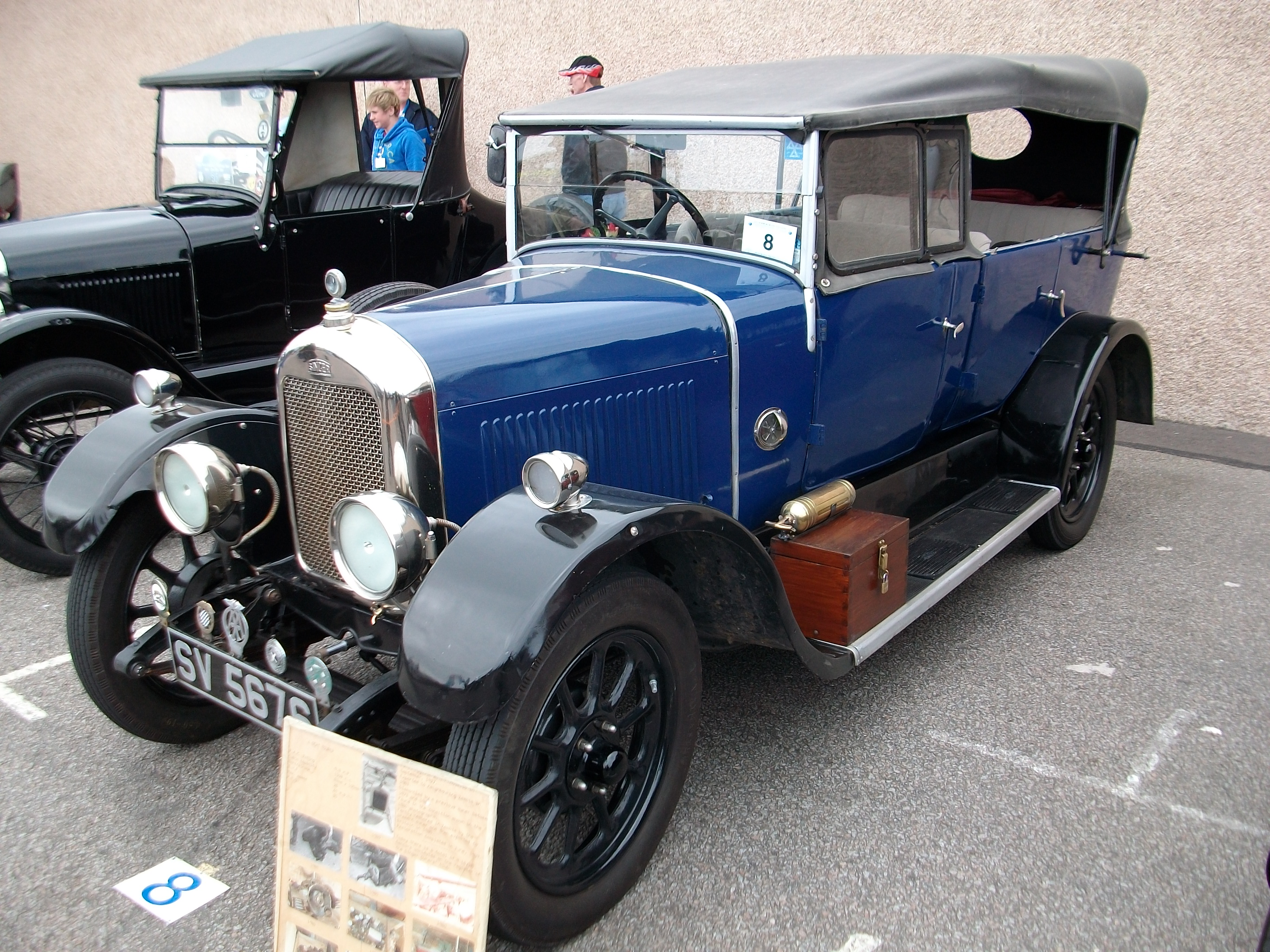
1927 Senior 10/26 tourer

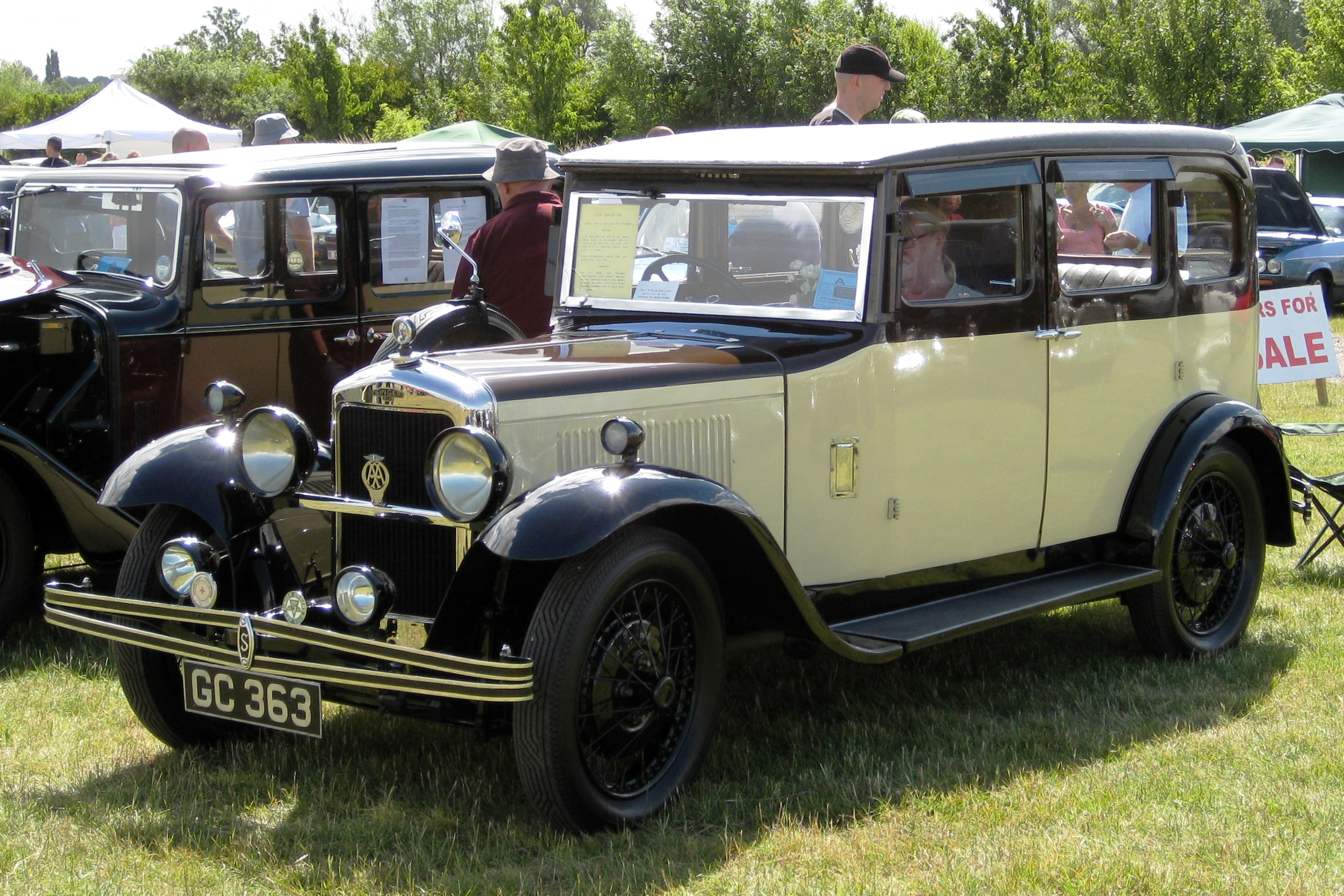
1930 Senior

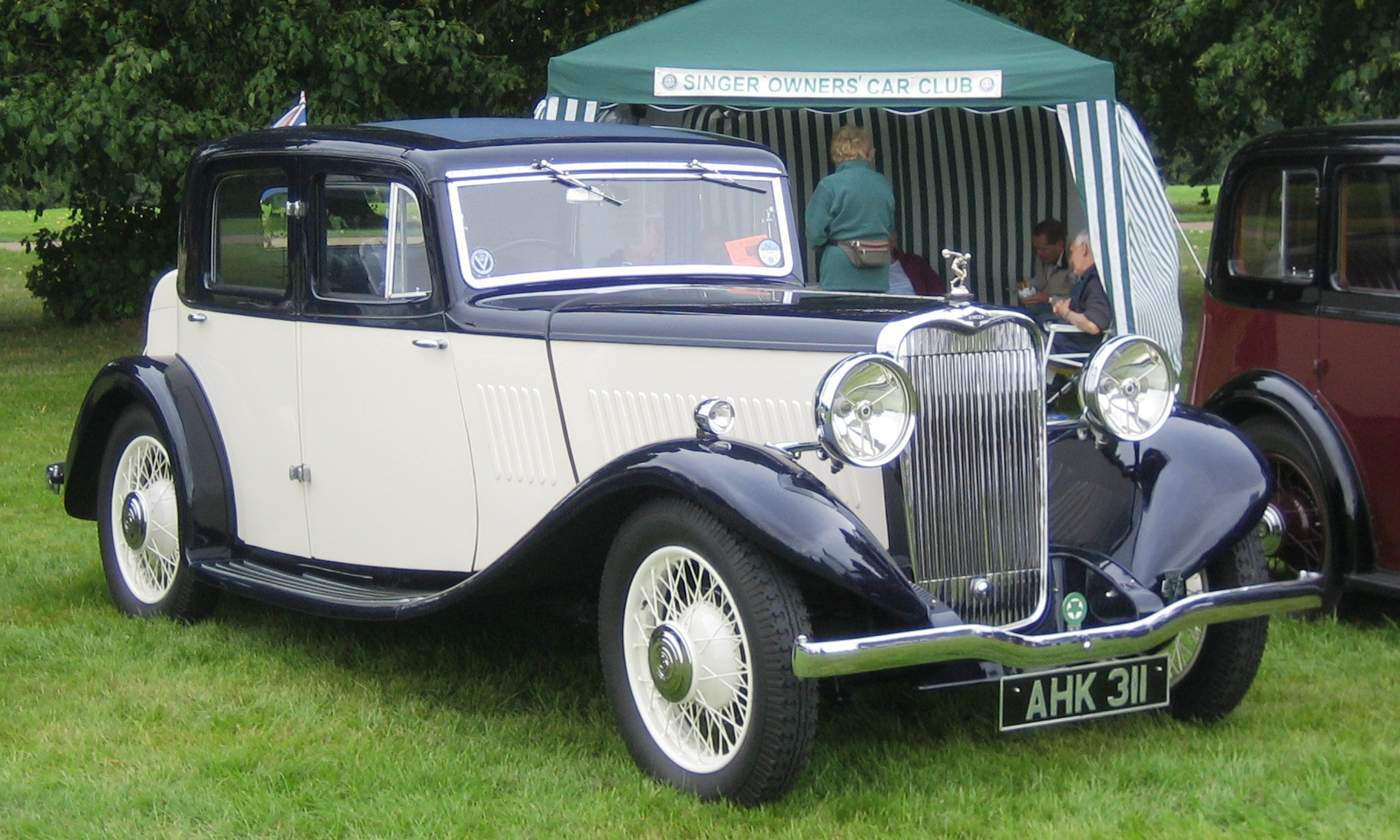
1933 Silent Six Continental sports saloon

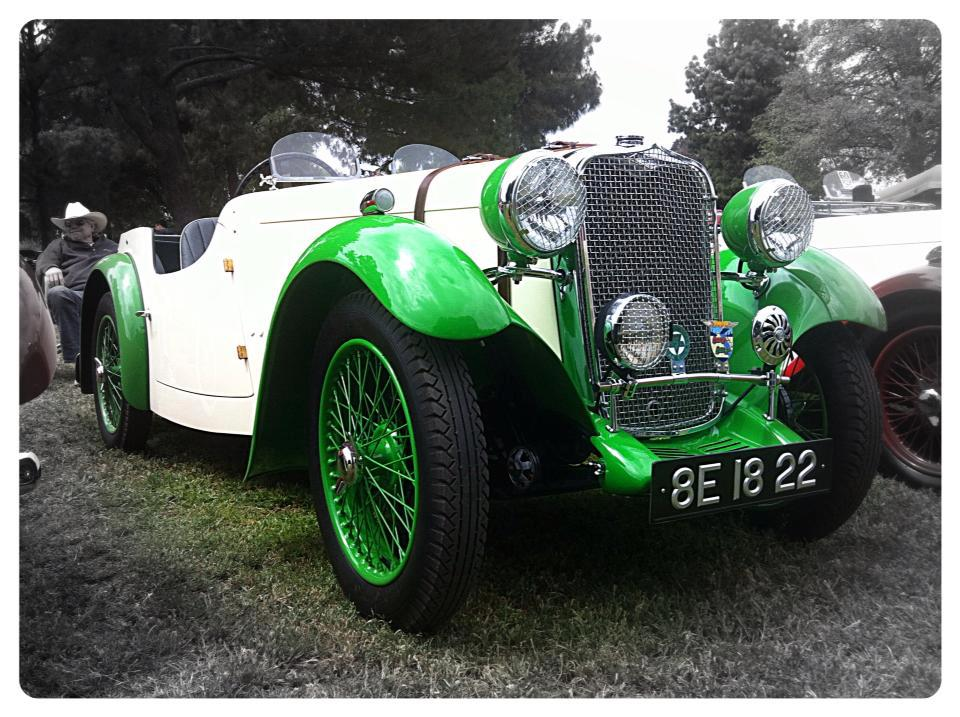
1933 972 cc (59.3 cu in) Nine Sports with helmet wings

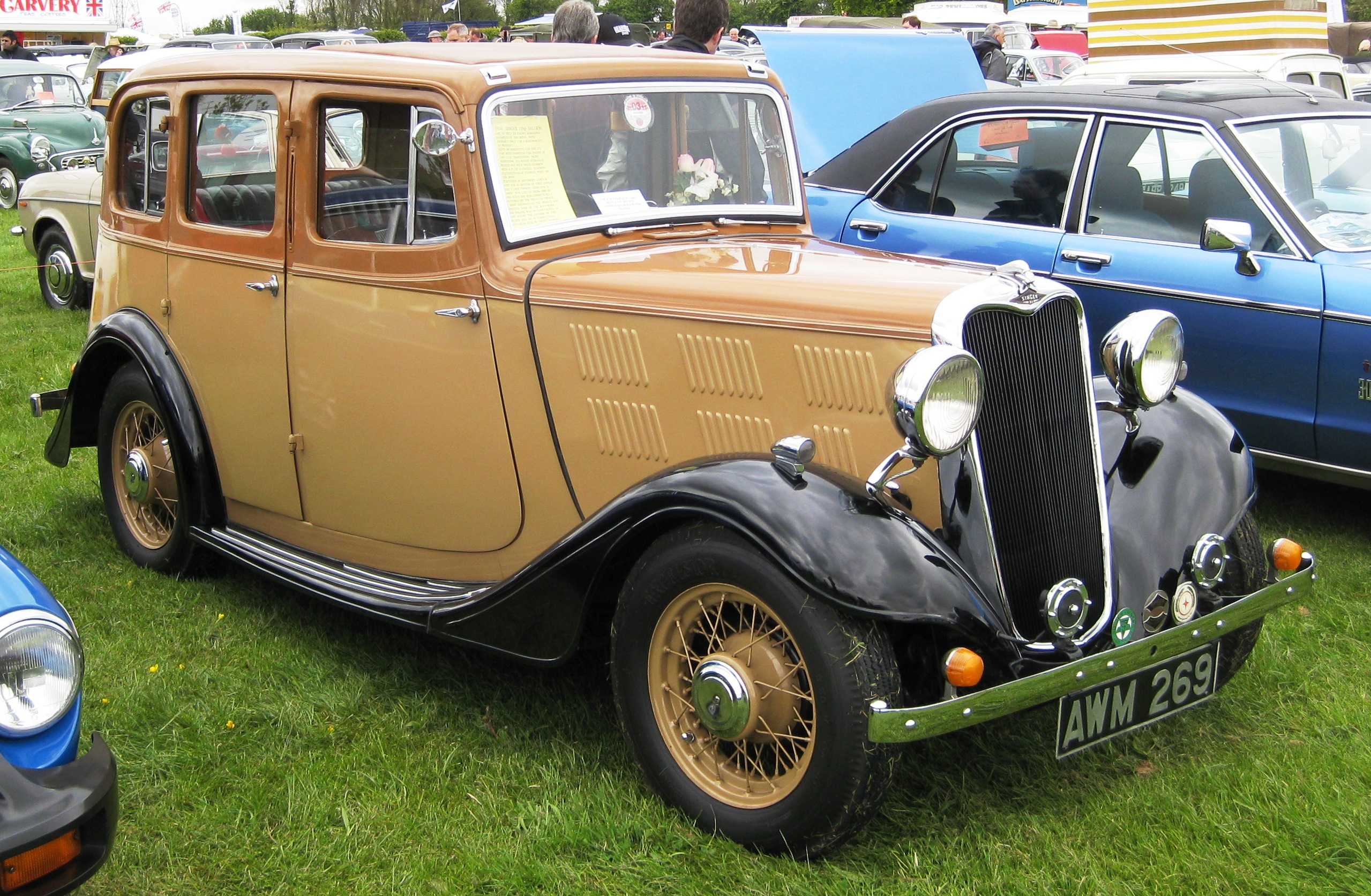
1934 Eleven saloon

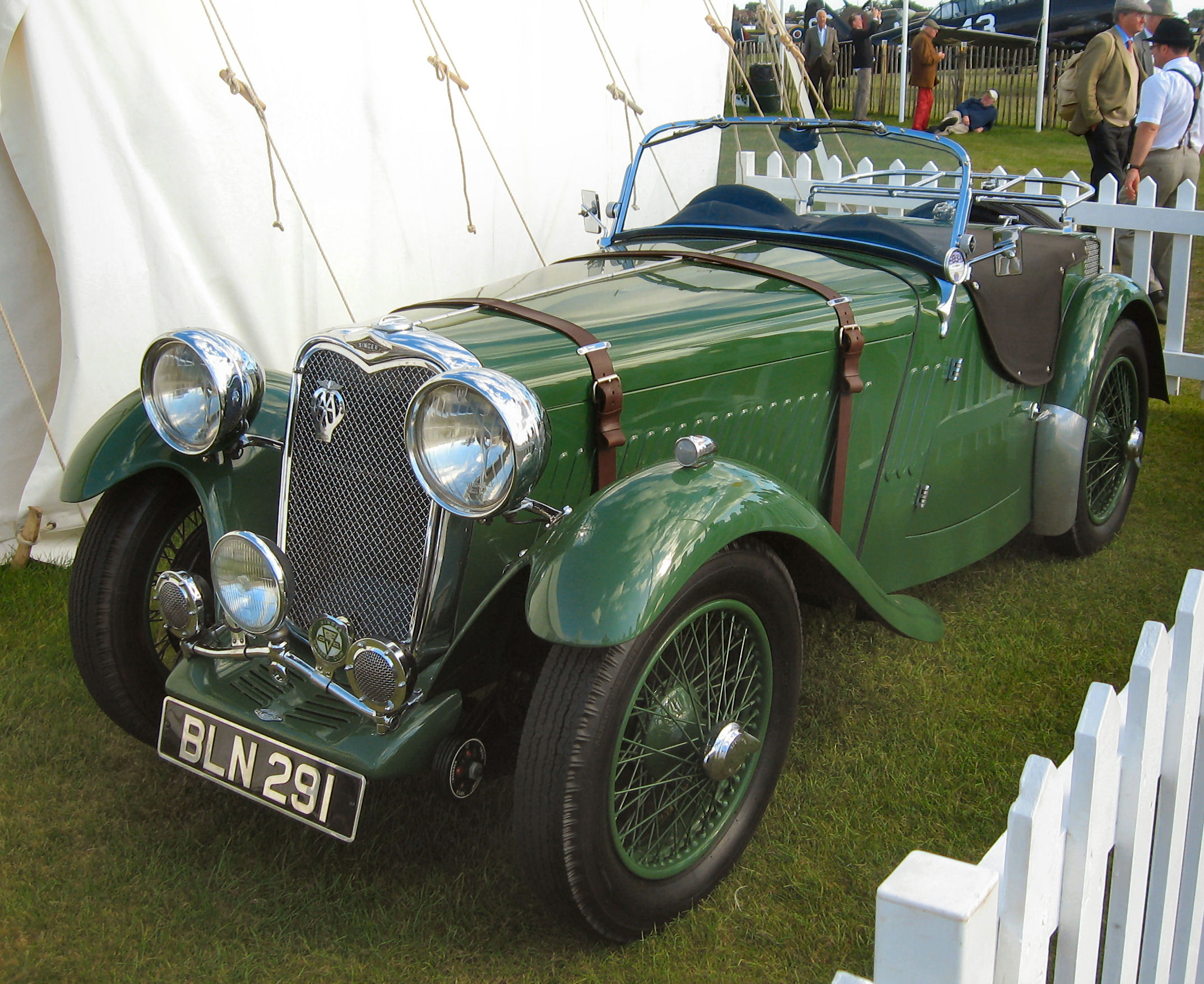
1934 Le Mans 1½-litre 2-seater Sports

==== Singer Motors Limited ====
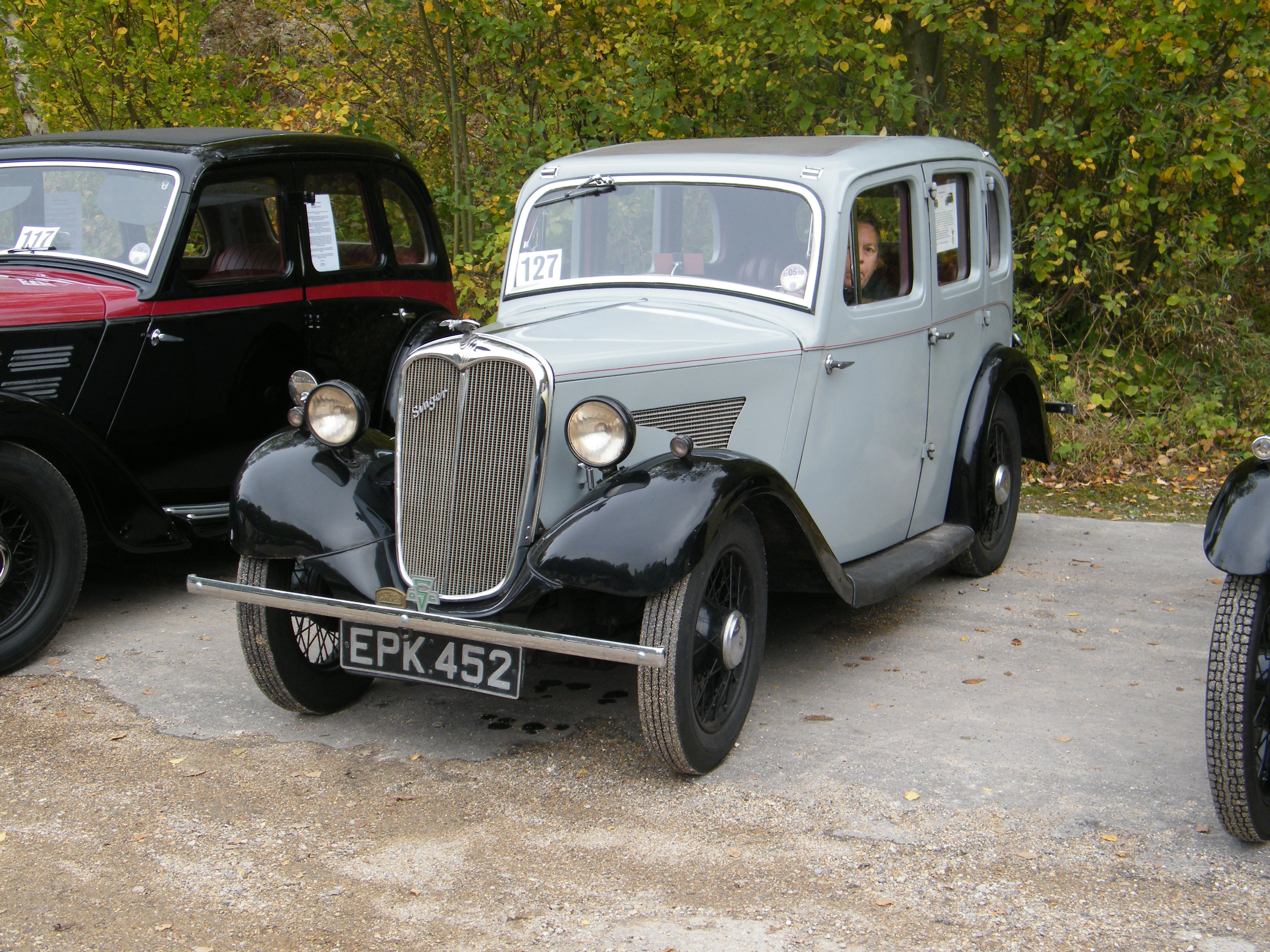
1936 Bantam Nine 4-door

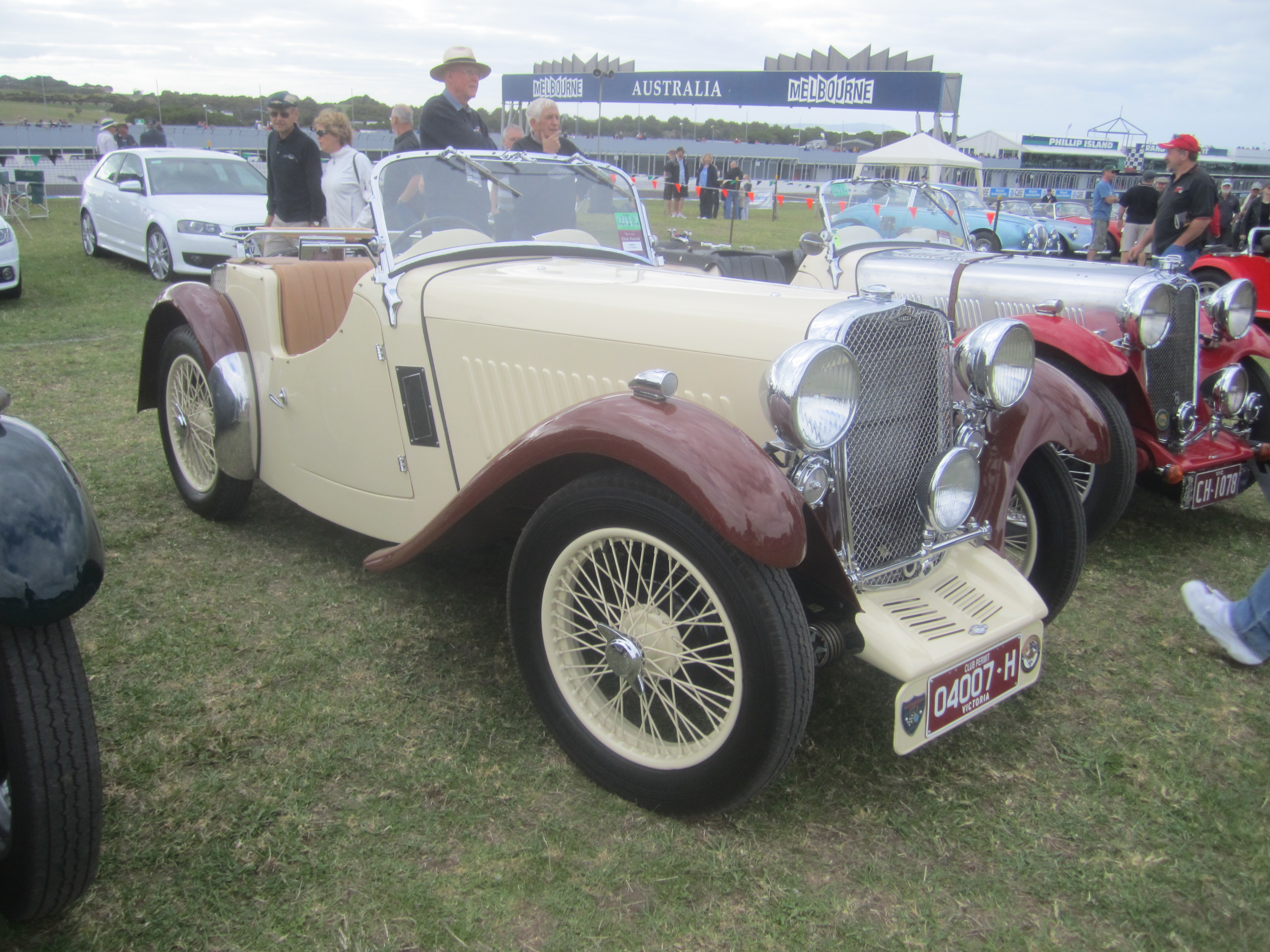
1936 Bantam Nine tourer

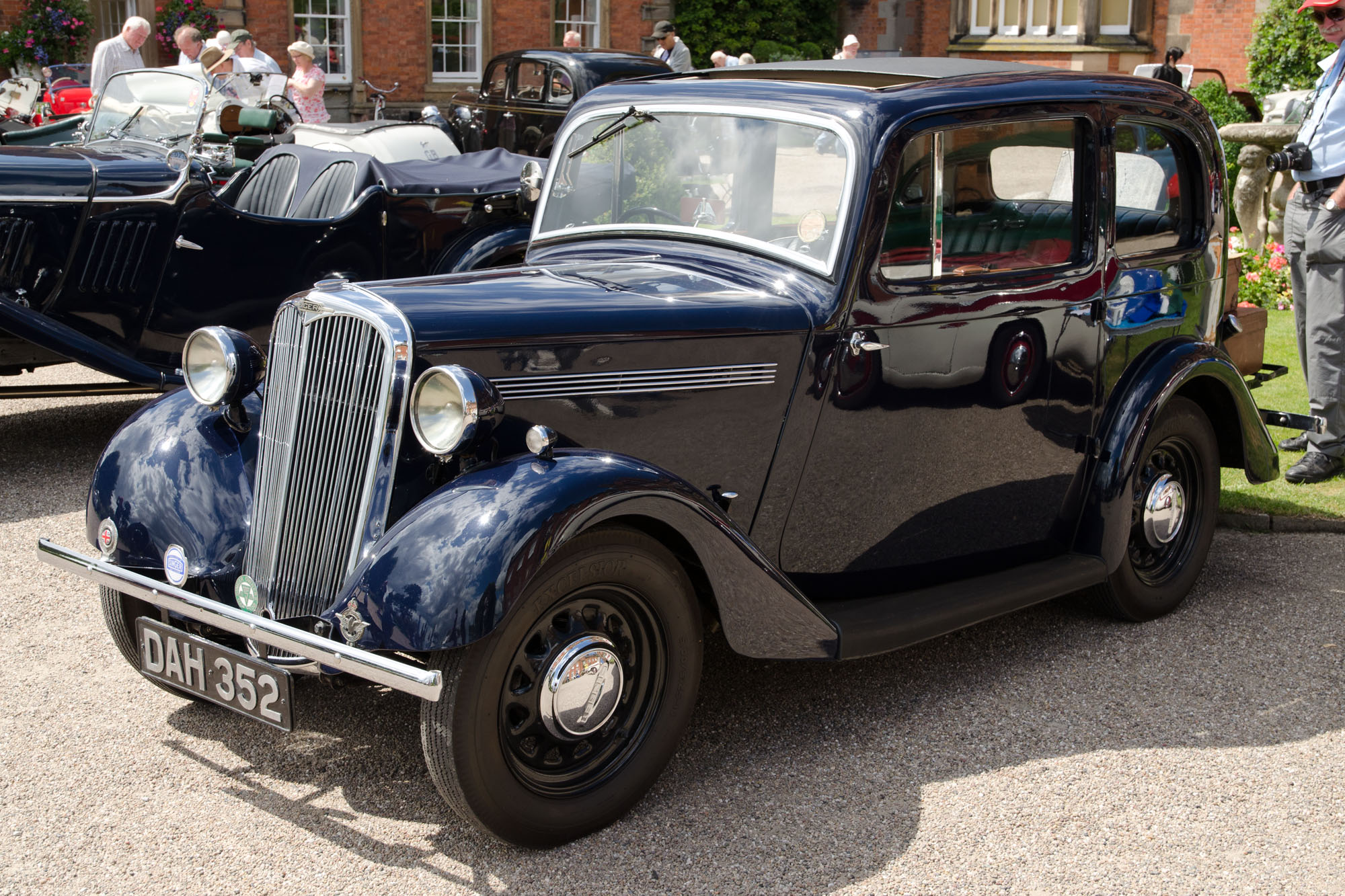
1939 Bantam Nine saloon

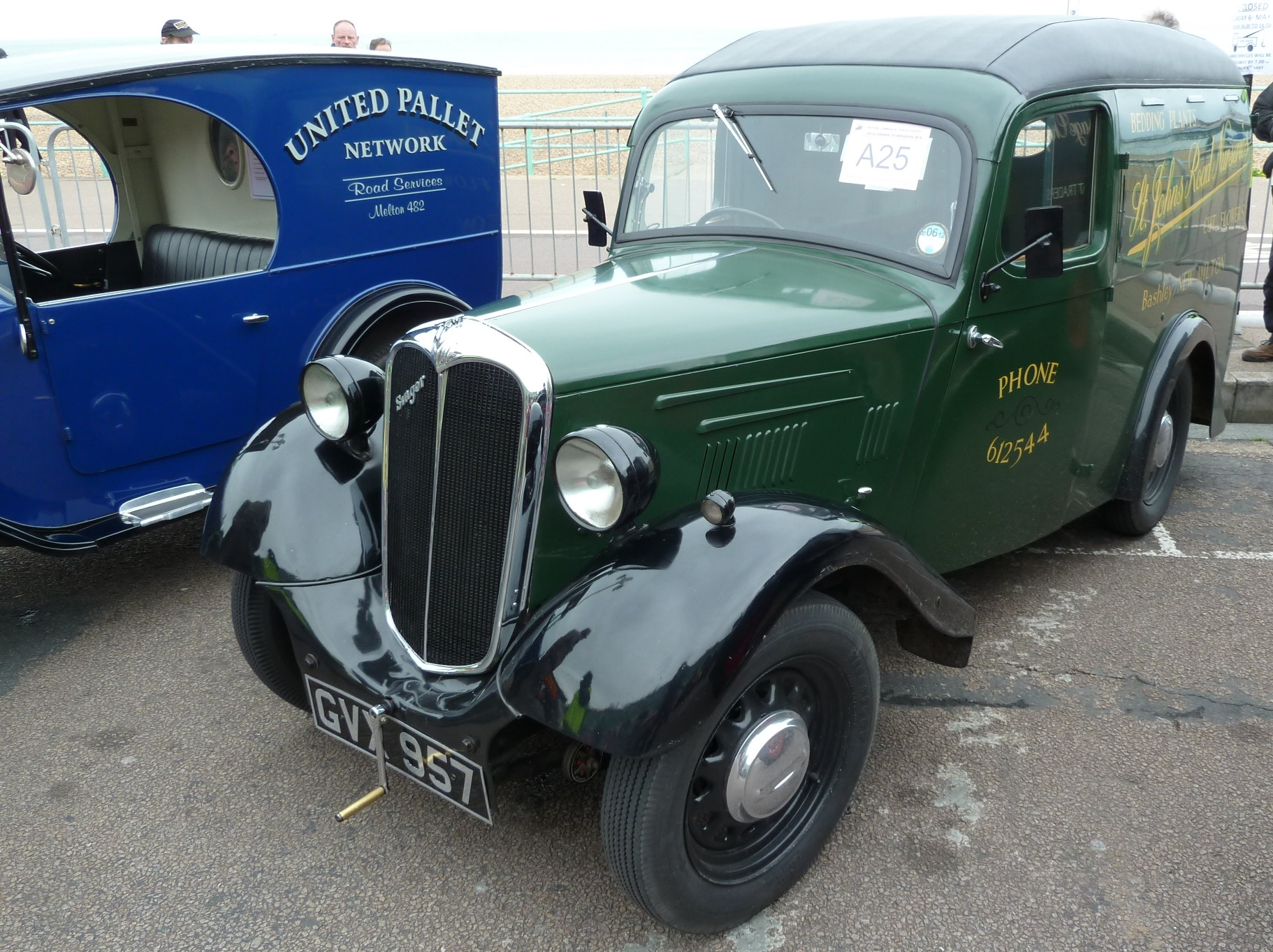
1939 Bantam Nine van

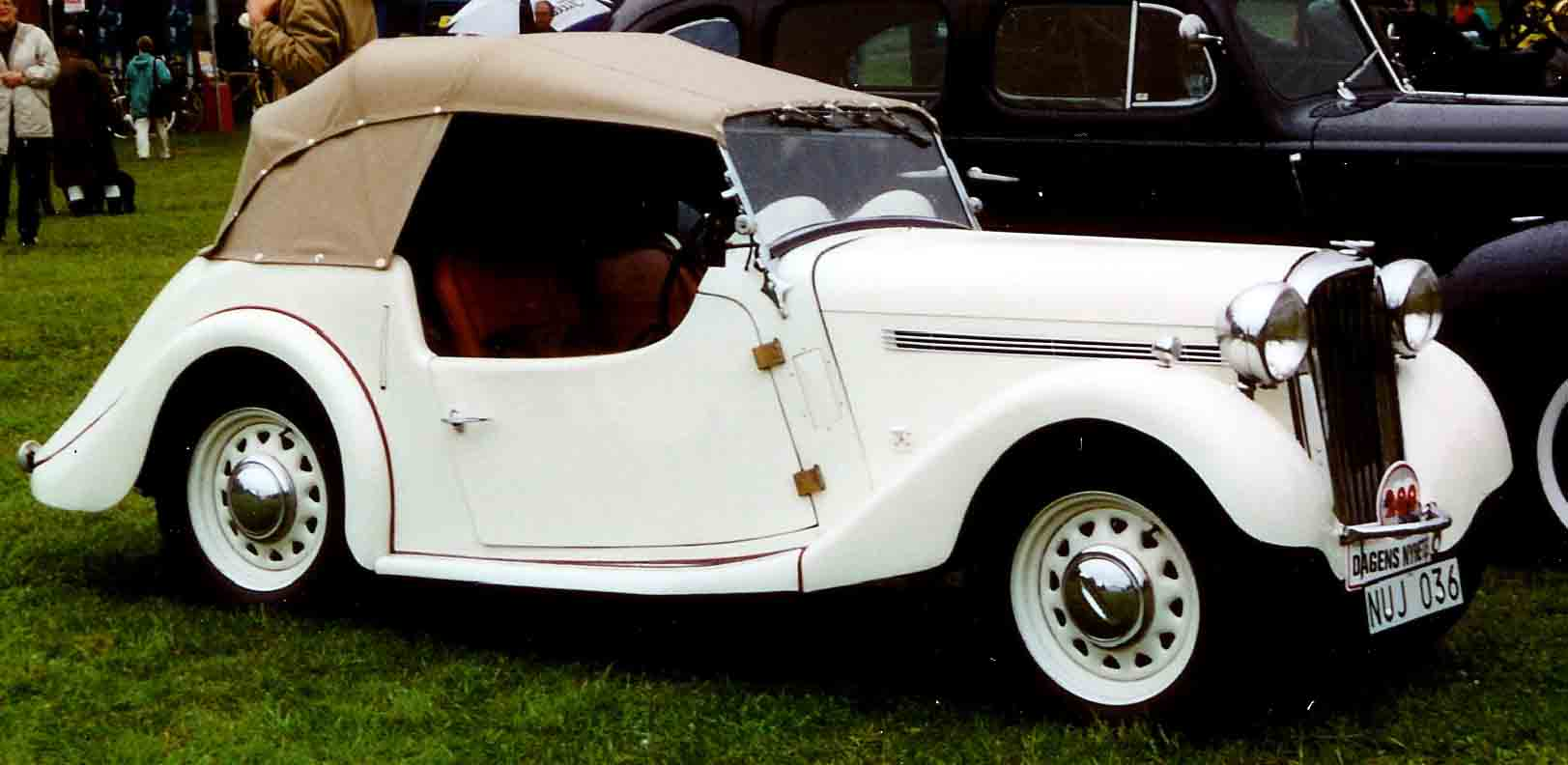
1939 Bantam Nine Roadster

From 1938 to 1955, Singer Motors Ltd supplied new OHC engines (a few 9HP, a 10HP and numerous 12 HPs plus 4-speed gearboxes) for fitment to HRG Engineering Company's sports cars at Tolworth, Surrey - these replaced the 1.5 litre Meadows engines fitted to earlier cars.

After the Second World War, the new Roadster and the Ten and Twelve saloons all returned to production with little change. In 1948, Singer's first streamlined car appeared, the SM1500 (designed by Technical Director Shorter), which featured coil spring IFS. and a separate chassis, still using the SOHC 1500cc engin; It was, however, expensive, at £799, and hopes it would save the company proved in vain.

The SM1500 was given a traditional radiator grille and renamed the Hunter in 1954; the high-priced Hunter was equally in vain. (Though specified with an optional HRG-designed DOHC engine, this was likely never sold.) In the December 2011 edition of Automobile Magazine, a 1954 SM1500 was compared to an MG TD, finding the Singer the superior roadster.

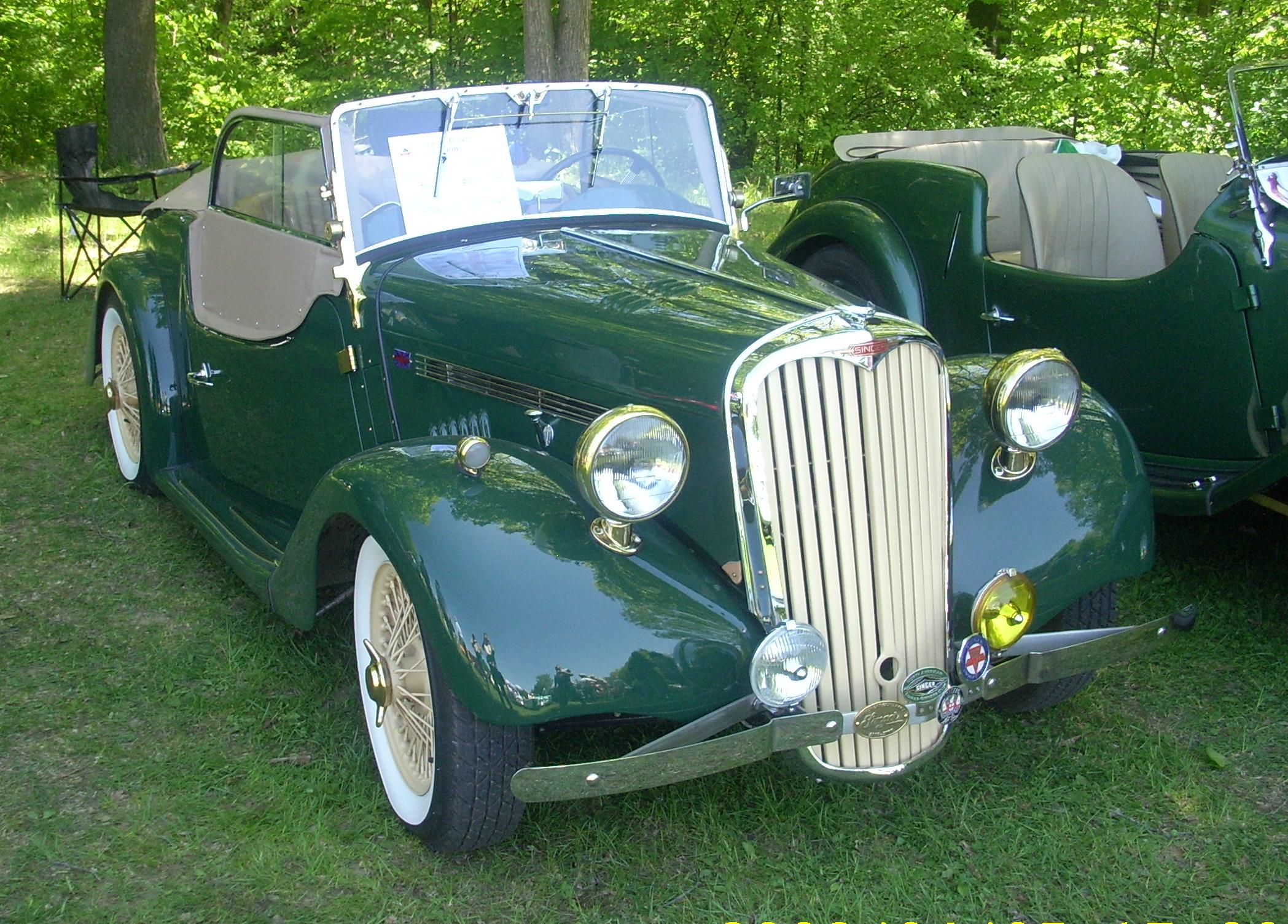
1948 North American-market Nine Roadster

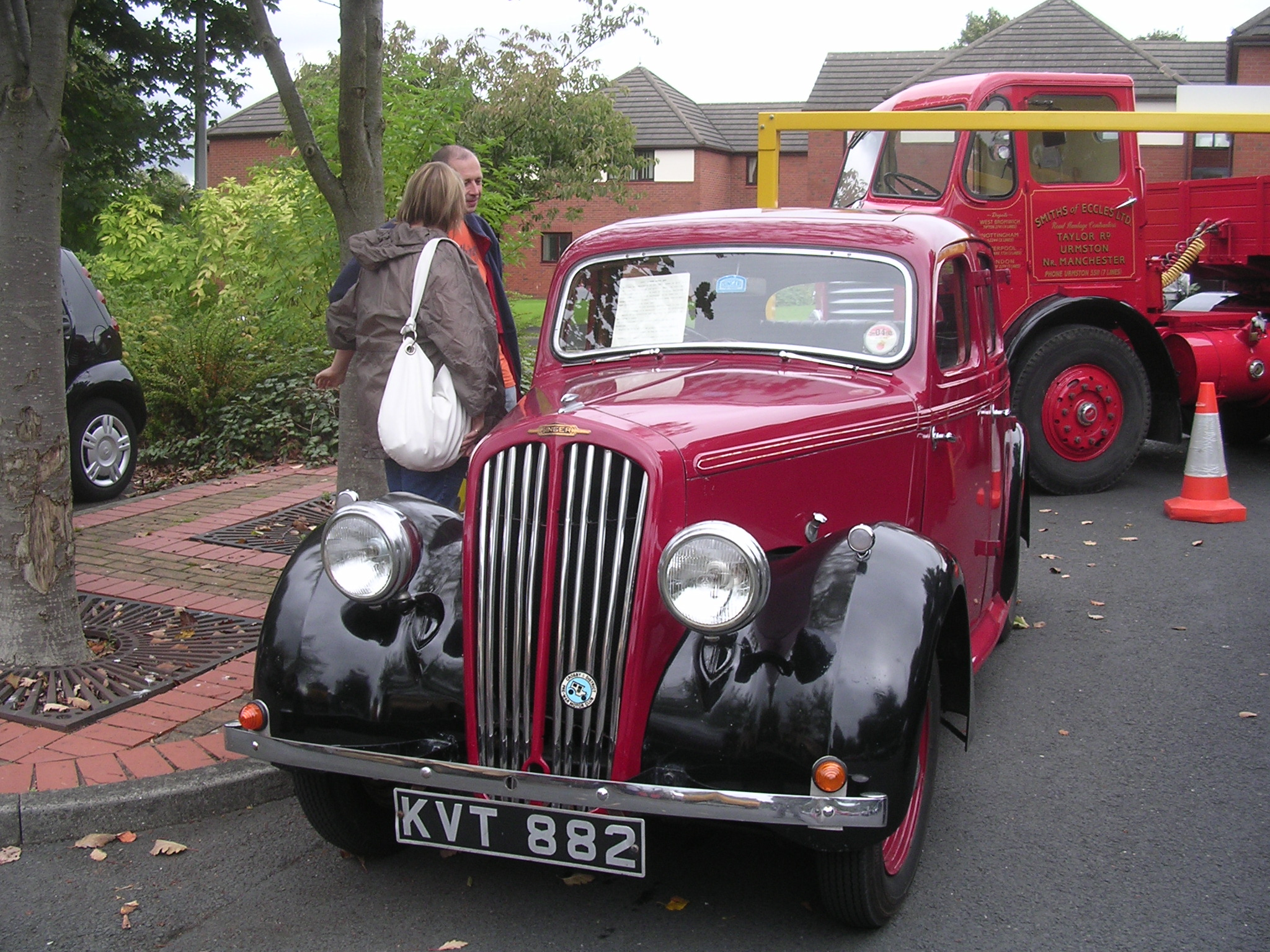
1946 Super Ten

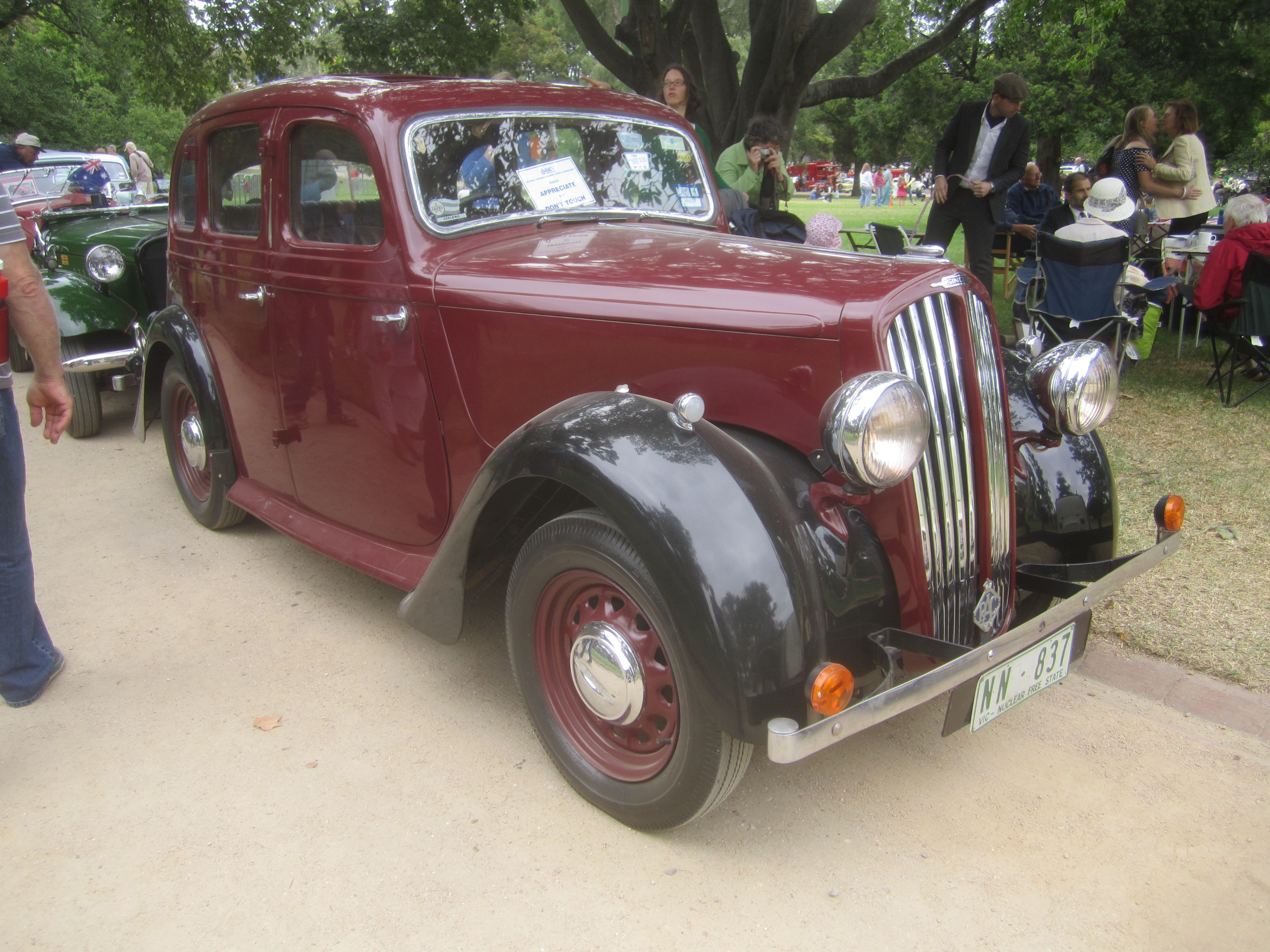
1949 Super Twelve

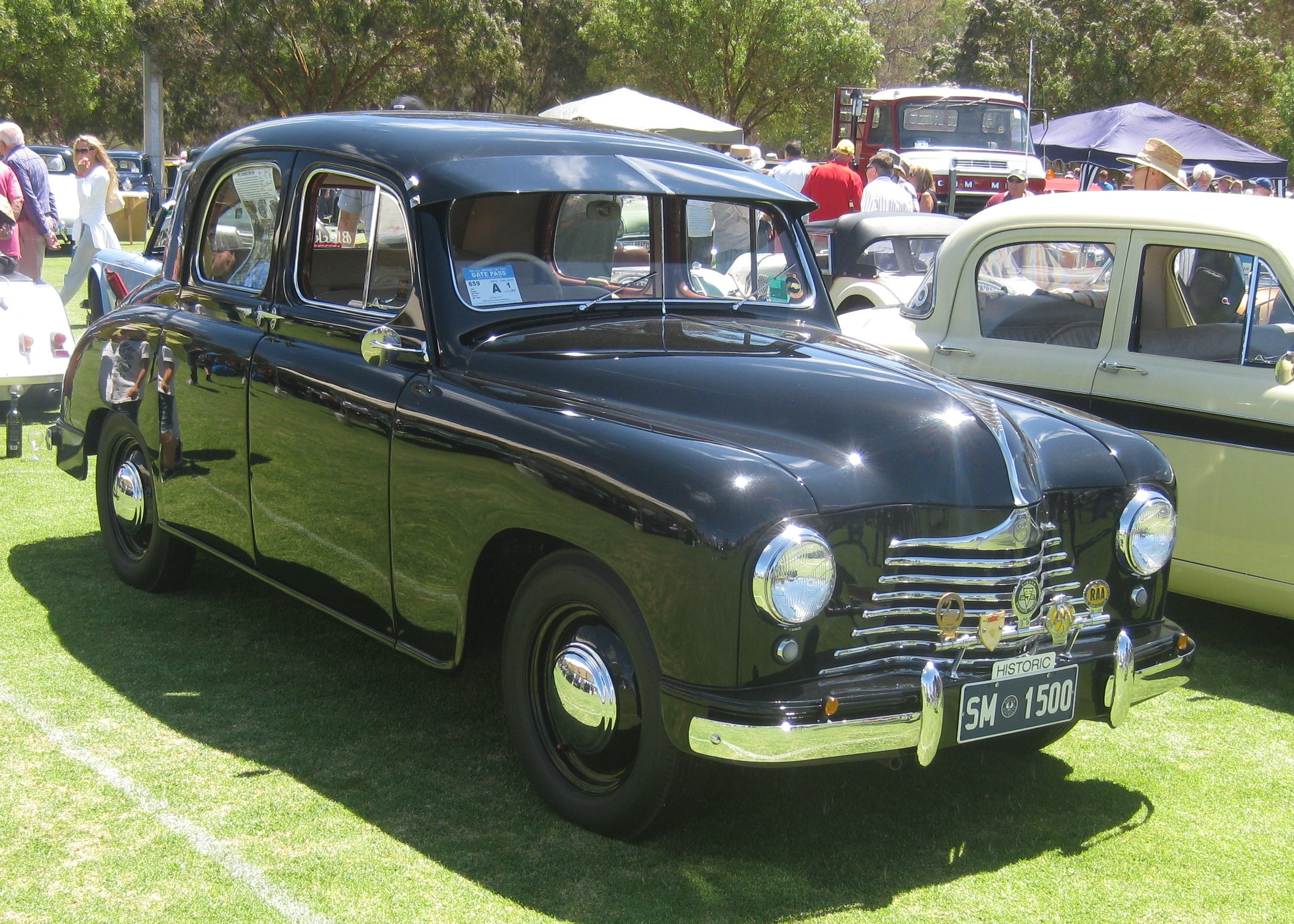
1948–54 SM1500

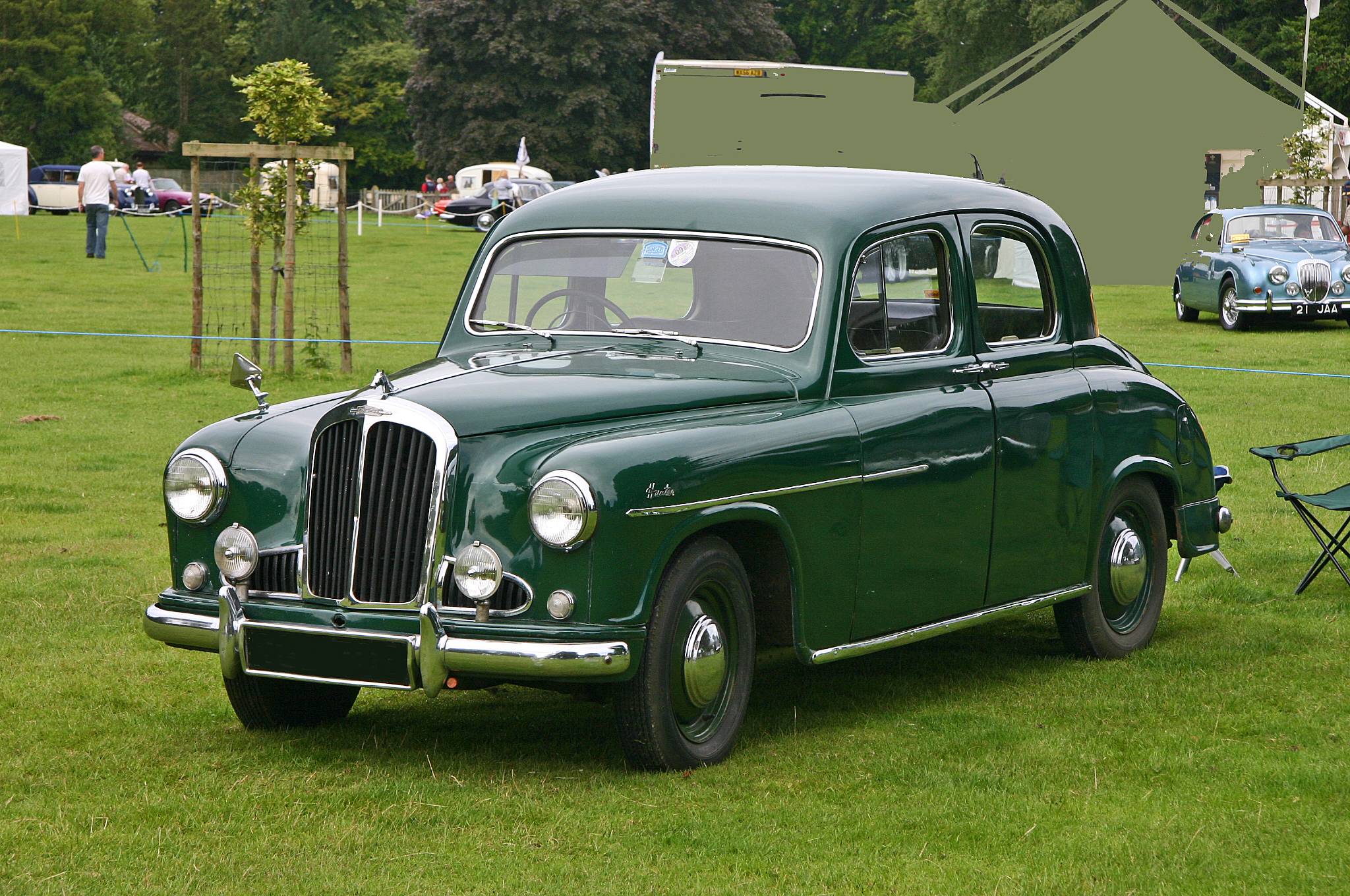
1954–56 Hunter

== Rootes Group ==
By 1955, the business was in financial difficulties and the Rootes Brothers bought it the following year. They had first handled Singer sales just before the First World War. The Singer brand was absorbed into their Rootes Group which had been an enthusiastic exponent of badge engineering since the early 1930s. The next Singer car, the Gazelle, was a more up-market Hillman Minx. which retained the pre-war designed Singer OHV engine for the I and II versions until 1958, when the IIA was given the Minx pushrod engine. The Vogue, which ran alongside the Minx/Gazelle from 1961, was based on the Hillman Super Minx with differing front end styling and more luxurious trim.

After 1958, all Singer products were mere badge-engineered models.

By 1970, Rootes were themselves struggling financially. They had been acquired by the American Chrysler corporation, and founder (by then Sir) William Rootes had died in 1964. In April 1970, as part of a rationalisation process, the last Singer rolled off the assembly line, almost 100 years after George Singer built the first cycle. The last car to carry the Singer name was an upmarket version of the rear engined Hillman Imp called the Chamois. With the take over of Rootes by Chrysler begun in 1964 and completed in 1967, many of the brands were set to vanish and use of the Singer name ended in 1970. The site of the Singer factory in Coventry is now occupied by Singer Hall, a hall of residence for Coventry University.

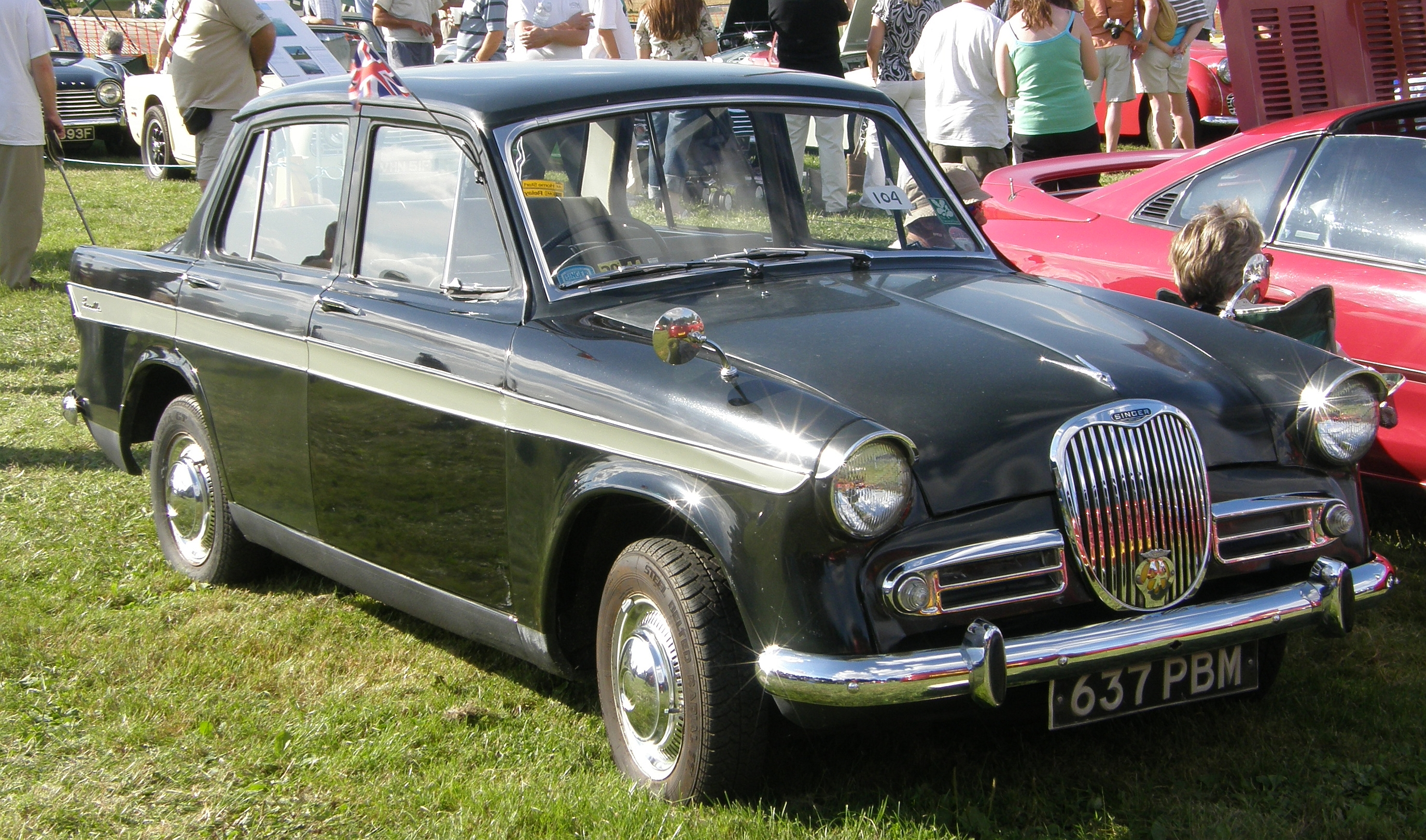
Gazelle Mark V

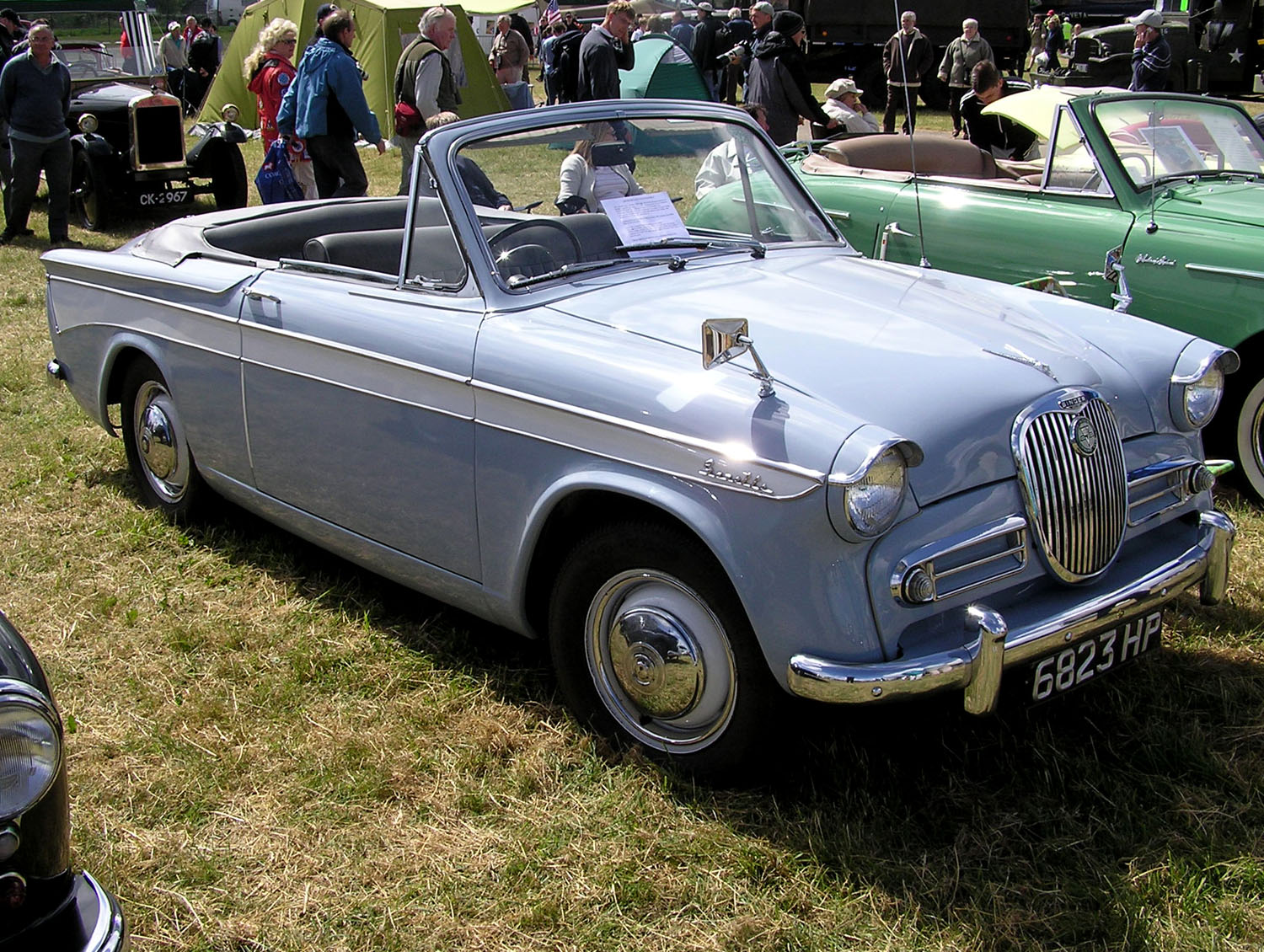
1960 Gazelle Convertible

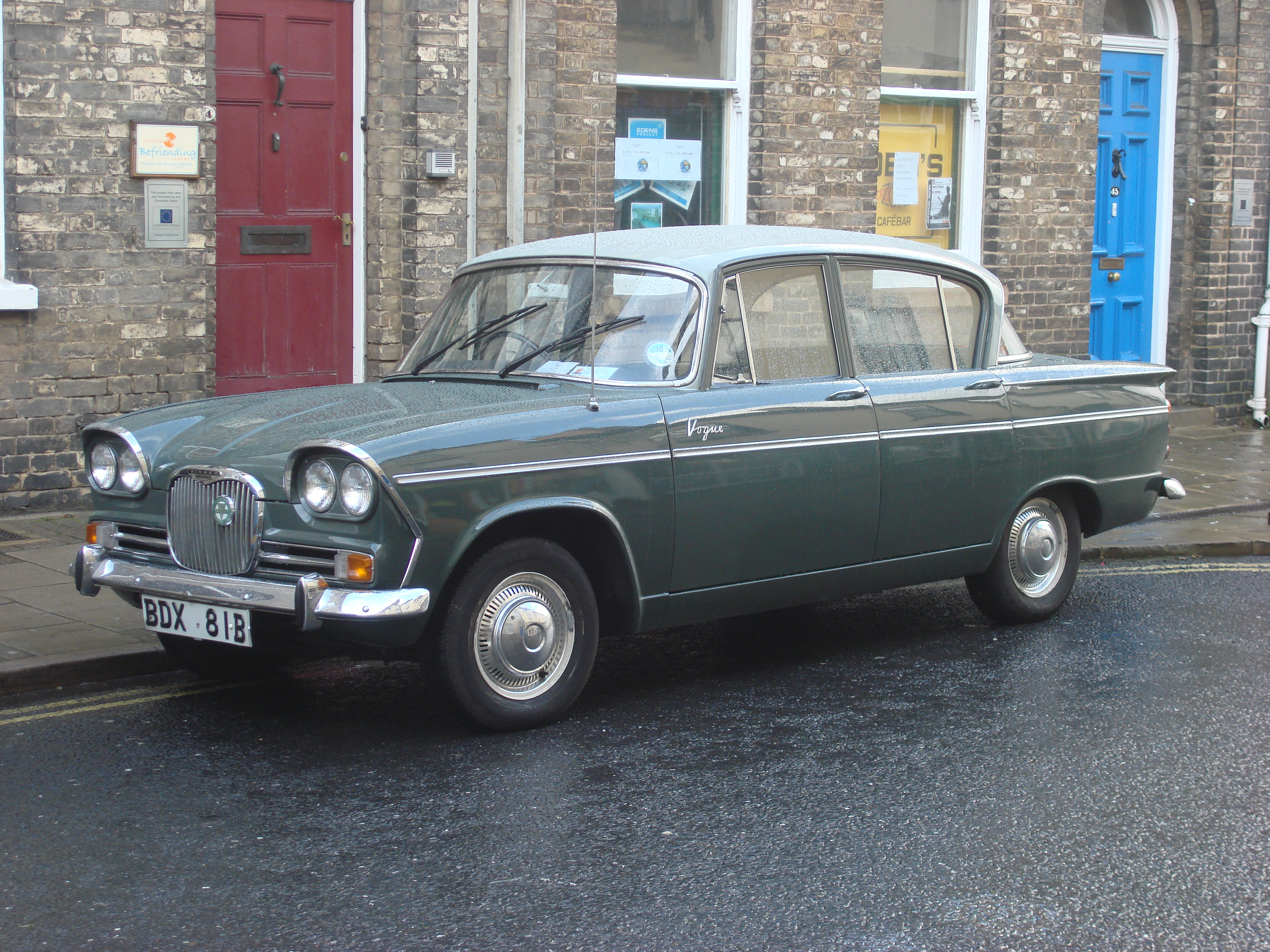
1962 Vogue

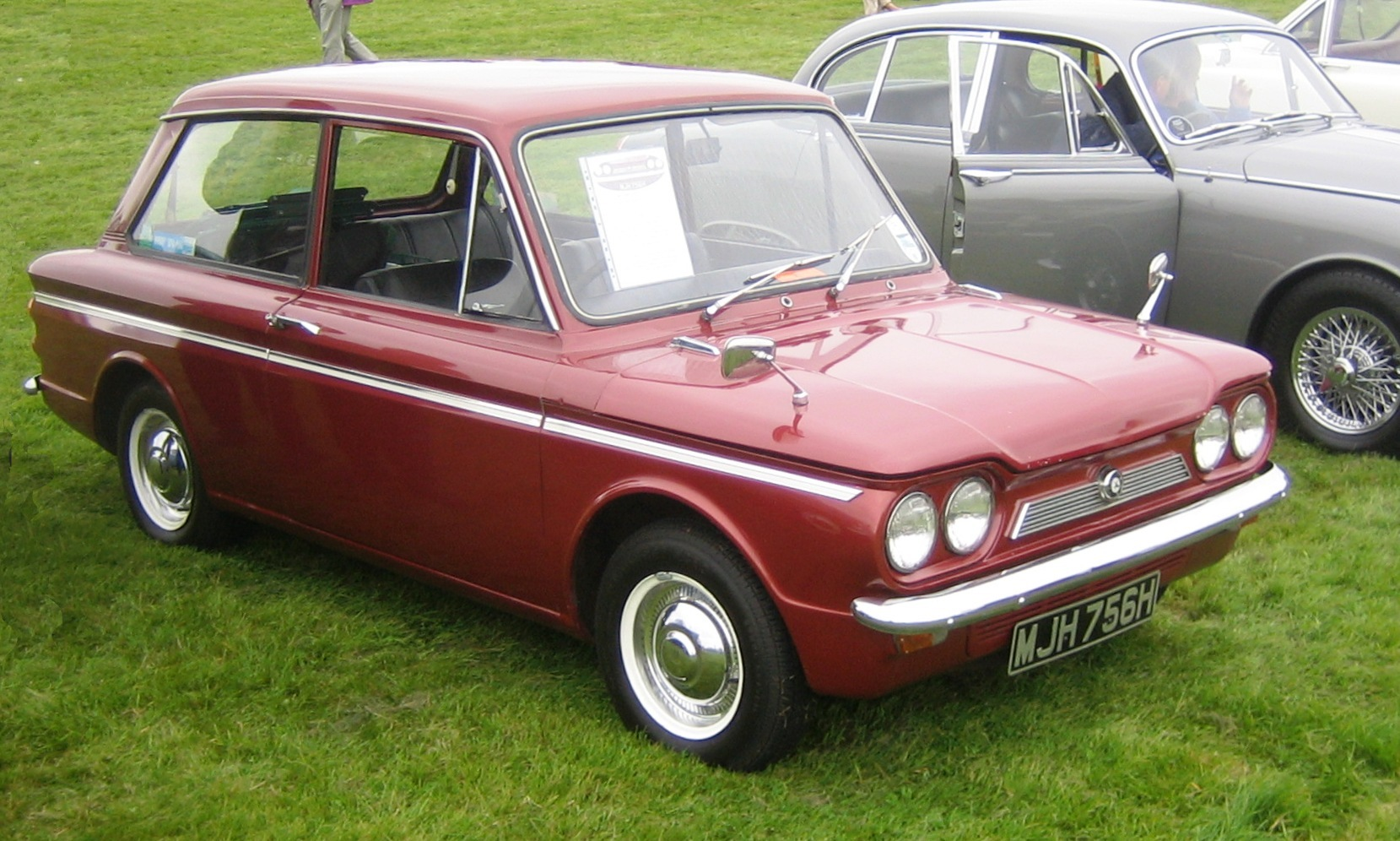
1965–70 Chamois

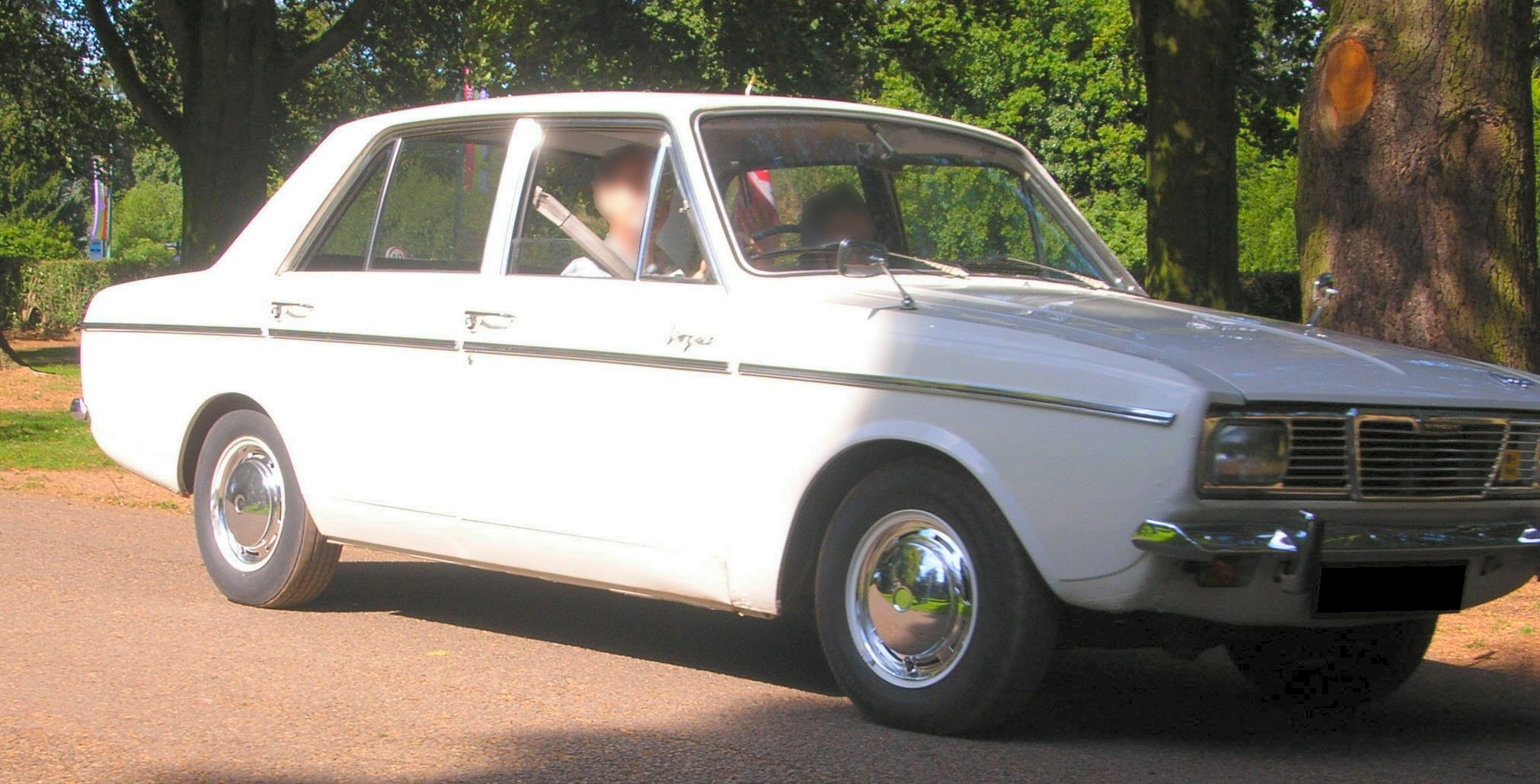
1968 Vogue

== Models ==
The main models produced were:
e. & o.e.

name	cylinders	cubic capacity	bore and stroke	tax horsepower	power output	years in production
Eight/Ten	2 sv	1,400 cc (85 cu in)	95 x 100	11.19	-	1905
Seven/Nine	2 sv	905 cc (55 cu in)	80 x90	7.94	-	1906–10
Twelve/Fourteen	2 sv	2,356 cc (144 cu in)	100 x 150	12.4	-	1906
Twelve/Fourteen	4 sv	1,810 cc (110 cu in)	80 x 90	15.87	-	1906–10
Ten	3 sv	1,358 cc (83 cu in)	80 x 90	11.9	-	1907
Twelve/Fifteen	4 sv	2,438 cc (149 cu in)	84 x 110	17.5	-	1907
Twenty/Twenty-two	4 sv	3,686 cc (225 cu in)	95 x 130	22.38	-	1907
Twenty/Twenty-five	4 sv	3,456 cc (211 cu in)	100 x 110	24.8	-	1908–10
Sixteen	4 sv	2,497 cc (152 cu in)	85 x 110	17.92	-	1909
Sixteen/Twenty	4 sv	2,799 cc (171 cu in)	90 x 110	20.09	-	1910
Twenty/Twenty-five	4 sv	4,712 cc (288 cu in)	100 x 150	24.8	-	1910
Fifteen	4 sv	2,614 cc (160 cu in)	80 x 130	15.87	-	1911–14
Twenty	4 sv	3,308 cc (202 cu in)	90 x 130	20.09	-	1911–15
Fourteen	4 sv	2,389 cc (146 cu in)	78 x 125	15.09	-	1912–14
Ten	4 sv	1,096 cc (67 cu in)	63 x 88	9.84	-	1912–16
Twenty-five	4 sv	4,084 cc (249 cu in)	100 x 130	24.8	-	1913–14
Senior	4 sv	2,614 cc (160 cu in)	80 x 130	15.87	30.2 bhp (22.5 kW; 30.6 PS) @ 2,150 rpm	1915

World War I

name	cylinders	cubic capacity	bore and stroke	tax horsepower	power output	years in production
Ten	4 sv	1,097 cc (67 cu in)	63 x 88	9.84	-	1919–23
Fifteen	6 sv	1,991 cc (121 cu in)	65 x 100	15.72	-	1921—1925
Ten/Twenty-six	4 ohv	1,308 cc (80 cu in)	63 x 105	9.84	-	1925–27
Eight	4	847 cc (52 cu in)	56 x 86	7.78	-	1926
Junior	4 sohc	850 cc (52 cu in)			-	1926–35
Fourteen/Thirty-four	6 ohv	1,776 cc (108 cu in)	63 x 95	14.76	-	1926
Fourteen/Thirty-four	6 ohv	1,792 cc (109 cu in)	65 x 90	15.72	-	1926
Six	6				-	1927
Eight Junior	4 ohc	848 cc (52 cu in)	56 x 86	7.78	16.5 bhp (12.3 kW; 16.7 PS) @ 3,250 rpm	1927–32
Ten	4	1,261 cc (77 cu in)	65 x 95	10.48	-	1927–32
Senior	4	1,571 cc (96 cu in)	69 x 105	11.81		1927–30
Singer 16	6 ohv	1,920 cc (117 cu in)	65.5 x 95	15.96	-	1929
Senior Six(Light Six)	6 sv	1,792 cc (109 cu in)	65 x 90	15.72	-	1930—31
Super Six	6 ohv	1,920 cc (117 cu in)	65.5 x 95	15.96	-	1930–31
2-litre	6 sohc	2,050 cc (125 cu in)	69.5 x 90	17.97	45 bhp (34 kW; 46 PS) @ 3,600 rpm	1933
Nine	4 sohc	972 cc (59 cu in)	60 x 86	8.93	31 bhp (23 kW; 31 PS) @ 4,800 rpm	1933–37
Nine Le Mans	4 sohc	972 cc (59 cu in)	60 x 86	8.93	35 bhp (26 kW; 35 PS) @ 4,500 rpm	1935–36
Nine Special Speed	4 sohc	972 cc (59 cu in)	60 x 86	8.93	38 bhp (28 kW; 39 PS) @ 5,000 rpm	1935
Twelve	4 sohc	1,442 cc (88 cu in)	69.5 x 95	11.98	32 bhp (24 kW; 32 PS) @ 3,600 rpm	1933–35
1½ litre Le Mans	6 sohc	1,493 cc (91 cu in)	59 x 91	12.95	48 bhp (36 kW; 49 PS) @ 4,600 rpm	1933–37
Fourteen Six	6 sohc	1,612 cc (98 cu in)	60 x 95	13.39	-	1933
Silent Six	6 sohc	2,162 cc (132 cu in)	69.5 x 95	17.97	-	1934
Continental	6 sohc	2,162 cc (132 cu in)	69.5 x 95	17.97	-	1934
Kaye Don Special	6 sohc	2,162 cc (132 cu in)	69.5 x 95	17.97	-	1934
Eleven fluidrive	4 sohc	1,459 cc (89 cu in)	66.5 x 105	11	39 bhp (29 kW; 40 PS) @ 4,000 rpm	1934–37
Eleven Airstream	4 sohc	1,584 cc (97 cu in)	69.5 x 105	11.98	39 bhp (29 kW; 40 PS) @ 4,000 rpm	1934–36
Sixteen Six ifs fluidrive	6 sohc	1,993 cc (122 cu in)	65 x 100	15.72	-	Aug 1934 onward
Silent Six	6 sohc	2,366 cc (144 cu in)			-	1934 onward
Bantam Nine	4 sohc	972 cc (59 cu in)	60 x 86	8.93	30 bhp (22 kW; 30 PS) @ 4,200 rpm	1936–38

——————————————————————————————————————————————

December 1936: Singer & Co Limited dissolved;
business transferred to Singer Motors Limited

——————————————————————————————————————————————

name	cylinders	cubic capacity	bore and stroke	tax horsepower	power output	years in production
Twelve	4 sohc	1,525 cc (93 cu in)	68 x 105	11.47		1937–39
Bantam Nine	4 sohc	1,074 cc (66 cu in)	60 X 95	8.93	30 bhp (22 kW; 30 PS) @ 4,200 rpm	1938–40
Nine	4 sohc	1,074 cc (66 cu in)	60 X 95	8.93	30 bhp (22 kW; 30 PS) @ 4,200 rpm	1938–1947
Ten	4 sohc	1,193 cc (73 cu in)	63.25 x 95	9.92	37 bhp (28 kW; 38 PS) @ 5,000 rpm	1938–48
Super Ten	4 sohc	1,193 cc (73 cu in)	63.25 x 95	9.92	37 bhp (28 kW; 38 PS) @ 5,000 rpm	1938–48
9 Roadster	4 sohc	1,074 cc (66 cu in)	60 x 95	8.93	36 bhp (27 kW; 36 PS) @ 5,000 rpm	1939–40 1946–49

World War II

name	cylinders	cubic capacity	bore and stroke	tax horsepower	power output	years in production
Super Twelve	4 sohc	1,525 cc (93 cu in)	68 x 105	11.47	43 bhp (32 kW; 44 PS) @ 4,000 rpm	1947–1949
9 Roadster series 4A	4 sohc	1,074 cc (66 cu in)	60 x 95	-	36 bhp (27 kW; 36 PS) @ 5,000 rpm	9/1949–10/50
9 Roadster series 4AB	4 sohc	1,074 cc (66 cu in)	60 x 95	-	36 bhp (27 kW; 36 PS) @ 5,000 rpm	10/1950–1/53
9 Roadster series 4AC	4 sohc	1,194 cc (73 cu in)			48 bhp (36 kW; 49 PS) @ 4,200 rpm	1950–1953
SM Roadster series 4AD	4 sohc	1,497 cc (91 cu in)	73 x 89.4	-	58 bhp (43 kW; 59 PS) @ 4,600 rpm	1951–1955
SM1500 saloon	4 sohc	1,525 cc (93 cu in)	68 x 105	11.47	43 bhp (32 kW; 44 PS) @ 4,000 rpm	1948–51
SM1500 saloon	4 sohc	1,497 cc (91 cu in)	73 x 89.4	-	58 bhp (43 kW; 59 PS) @ 4,600 rpm	1951–54
½ ton Utility circa 1952	4 sohc	1,497 cc (91 cu in)	73 x 89.4	-	-	circa 1952
Hunter	4 sohc	1,497 cc (91 cu in)	73 x 89.4	-	58 bhp (43 kW; 59 PS) @ 4,600 rpm	1954–56
Hunter 75	4 sohc	1,497 cc (91 cu in)	73 x 89.4	-	75 bhp (56 kW; 76 PS) @ 5,250 rpm	1955–56
SMX prototype	4 sohc	1,497 cc (91 cu in)	73 x 89.4	-	48 bhp (36 kW; 49 PS) @ 4,500 rpm	1956

——————————————————————————————————————————————

December 1955: Singer Motors joins Rootes Group

——————————————————————————————————————————————

name	cylinders	cubic capacity	bore and stroke	tax horsepower	power output	years in production
Gazelle I	4 sohc	1,497 cc (91 cu in)	73 x 89.4		52.5 bhp (39.1 kW; 53.2 PS) @ 4,500 rpm	1956–57
Gazelle II	4 sohc	1,497 cc (91 cu in)	73 x 89.4		52.5 bhp (39.1 kW; 53.2 PS) @ 4,500 rpm	1957–58
Gazelle IIA	4 ohv	Rootes engine 1,494 cc (91 cu in)	79 x 76.2		60.2 bhp (44.9 kW; 61.0 PS) @ 4,500 rpm	1958
Gazelle III	4 ohv	1,494 cc (91 cu in)	79 x 76.2		60 bhp (45 kW; 61 PS) @ 4,500 rpm	1958–59
Gazelle IIIA	4 ohv	1,494 cc (91 cu in)	79 x 76.2		64 bhp (48 kW; 65 PS) @ 4,600 rpm	1959–60
Gazelle IIIB	4 ohv	1,494 cc (91 cu in)	79 x 76.2		60 bhp (45 kW; 61 PS) @ 4,500 rpm	1960–61
Gazelle IIIC	4 ohv	1,592 cc (97 cu in)	81.5 x 76.2		63 bhp (47 kW; 64 PS) @ 4,100 rpm	1961–63
Gazelle V	4 ohv	1,592 cc (97 cu in)	81.5 x 76.2		67 bhp (50 kW; 68 PS) @ 4,100 rpm	1963–65
Gazelle VI	4 ohv	1,725 cc (105 cu in)	81.5 x 76.2		62.5 bhp (46.6 kW; 63.4 PS) @ 4,200 rpm	1965–67
New Gazelle	4 ohv	1,725 cc (105 cu in)	81.5 x 76.2		62.5 bhp (46.6 kW; 63.4 PS) @ 4,800 rpm 74 bhp (55 kW; 75 PS) @ 5,000 rpm	1967–70
Vogue I	4 ohv	1,592 cc (97 cu in)	81.5 x 76.2		66 bhp (49 kW; 67 PS) @ 4,800 rpm	1961–62
Vogue II	4 ohv	1,592 cc (97 cu in)	81.5 x 76.2		66 bhp (49 kW; 67 PS) @ 4,800 rpm	1963–64
Vogue III	4 ohv	1,592 cc (97 cu in)	81.5 x 76.2		78.5 bhp (58.5 kW; 79.6 PS) @ 5,000 rpm	1964–65
Vogue IV	4 ohv	1,725 cc (105 cu in)	81.5 x 82.55		80 bhp (60 kW; 81 PS) @ 5,000 rpm	1965–66
New Vogue	4 ohv	1,725 cc (105 cu in)	81.5 x 82.55		80 bhp (60 kW; 81 PS) @ 5,000 rpm	1966–70
Chamois	4 ohv	875 cc (53 cu in)	68 x 60.375		39 bhp (29 kW; 40 PS) @ 5,000	1965–70

== See also ==
- Premier Motorcycles
- George E. Stanley
- List of car manufacturers of the United Kingdom

== Sources ==
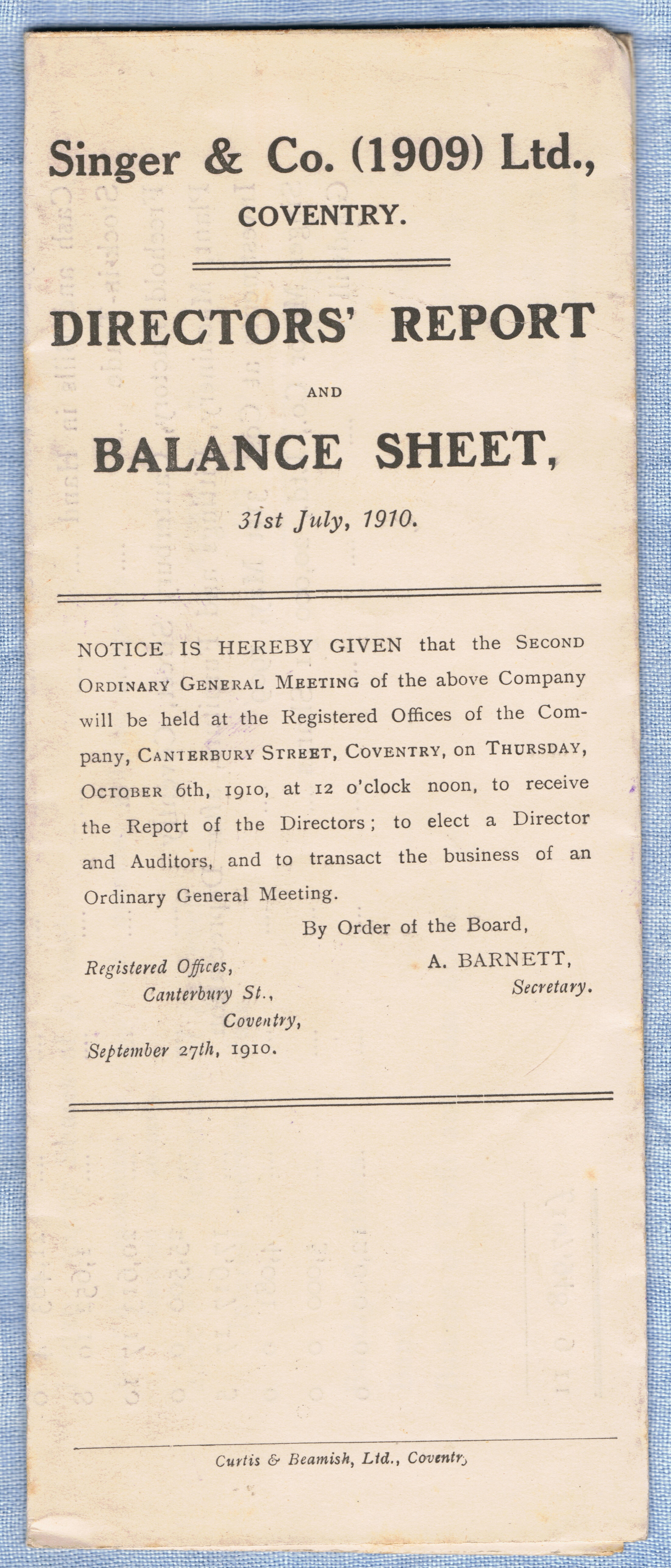
Cover of Singer & Co. (1909) Ltd., directors' report, 31 July 1910.

- Kevin Atkinson The Singer Story, Cars, Commercial Vehicles, Bicycles, Motorcycles; Veloce Publishing ISBN 9781874105527
- Wise, David Burgess. "Singer: A Car for Every Purse and Purpose" in Ward, Ian, Executive Editor. The World of Automobiles, Volume 18, pp. 2064-71. London: Orbis, 1974.
