= Singer SM1500 =

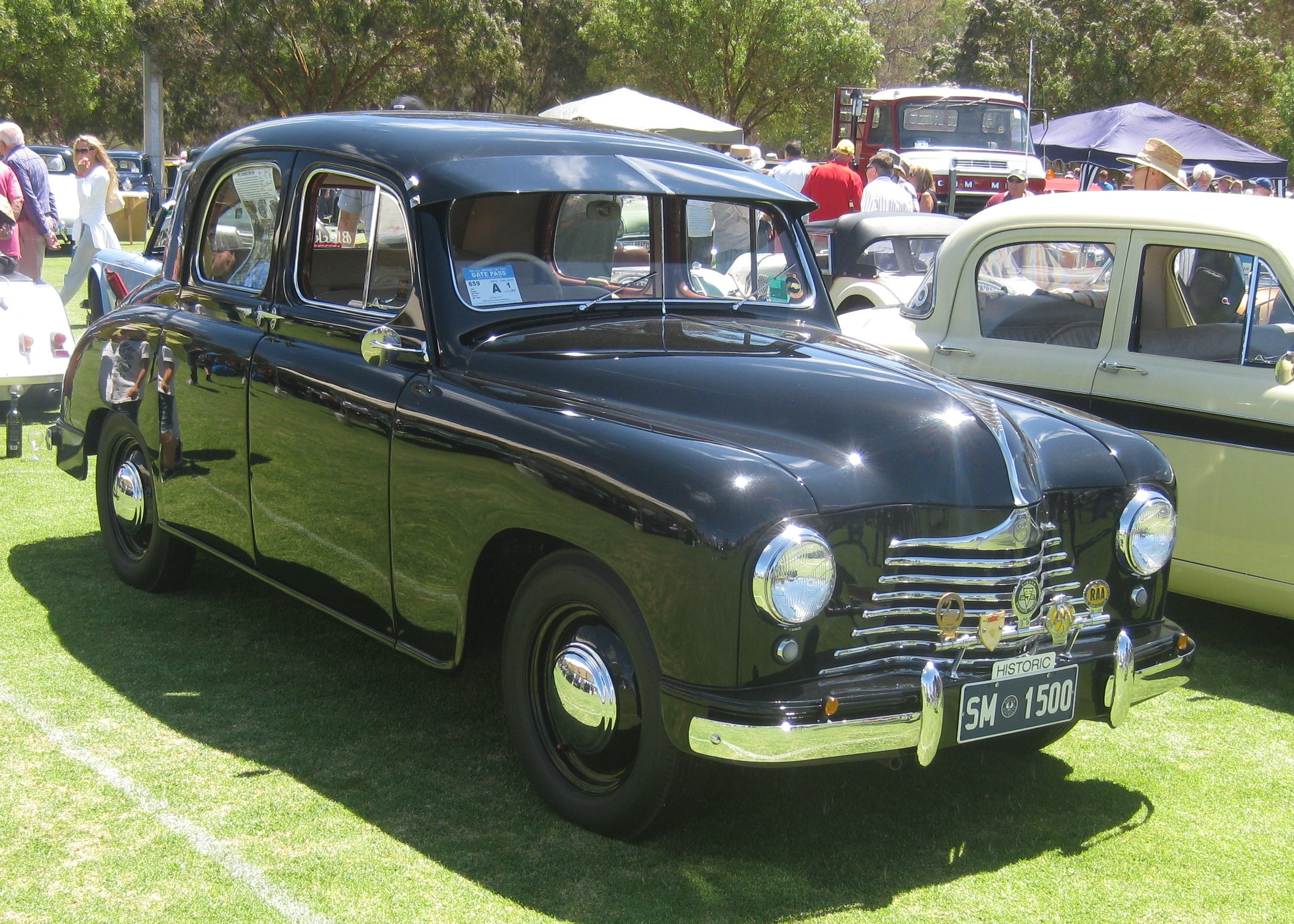
- SM1500 early model before headlamps were raised

Overview
- Manufacturer: Singer Motors
- Production: 1948–1954; 17,382 produced

Body and chassis
- Class: Small family car (C)
- Body style: 4-door saloon 2-door coupé utility

Powertrain
- Engine: 1,506 and 1,497 cc overhead cam
- Transmission: 4-speed manual

Dimensions
- Wheelbase: 107 in (2,718 mm)
- Length: 176 in (4,470 mm)
- Width: 63 in (1,600 mm)
- Height: 64 in (1,626 mm)

Chronology
- Predecessor: Singer Super Ten; Singer Super Twelve
- Successor: Singer Hunter (see below)

The Singer SM1500 is a small family car produced by Singer Motors from 1948 to 1956. The first new design produced by Singer after World War II it was planned to replace their Super Ten and Super Twelve.

Following a minor facelift in 1952 the SM1500 was given a traditional Singer radiator grille in 1954 and in that form, known as a Singer Hunter, it remained in production until shortly after the business was sold to Rootes Securities at the beginning of 1956. The sturdy Singer engine was briefly installed in a modified Hillman Minx named Singer Gazelle.

== Design and development ==
Both the completion of a first prototype and a general description of the new unnamed car were announced in November 1947 and an early production car was displayed at the Earls Court Motor Show in October 1948. Singer's first demonstrators were sent overseas at Christmas time 1948. Production finally commenced just before the end of July 1949 with export-only deliveries beginning after that.

The chairman explained to the shareholders' meeting in December 1950 that Singer made no motor vehicles from March 1940 until after the end of the war and for this reason the SM1500 employed and was built using out-dated pre-war technology.

== SM1500 ==
Singer's SM1500 had a pressed-steel body mounted on a separate chassis with at the front a Packard designed coil spring independent suspension built under licence. The brakes were hydraulically operated using a Lockheed system with 9 in (229 mm) drums. The four-speed gearbox had a column change which made it difficult or impossible to select second and reverse. "Many an exasperated driver rammed his knuckles into the mock-wood-painted metal dashboard in the attempt".

The car was almost unique among British volume-produced saloons in featuring an overhead camshaft engine though both Wolseley's postwar cars and the Morris Six MS did also use Wolseley's normal single overhead camshafts. Singer's engine was based on the one used in the Super 12 but with larger bore and shorter stroke, giving a capacity of 1506 cc. From 1951 the stroke was further reduced to give a capacity of 1497 cc to bring it into the sub 1500 class. From 1952 a 58 bhp (43 kW) twin-carburettor version was available for an extra £28. It was reported that the engine block was so tough that the manufacturers were happy to quote 65,000 miles (105,000 kilometers) as a "normal" interval between rebores.

The body was styled by Leo Shorter, Singer's chief engineer since 1937. He had been inspired by Howard Darrin's 1946 Kaiser-Frazer. Shorter lacked Darrin's flair and "produced one of the ugliest saloons of its period".

Inside, the car had a bench front seat with folding armrest and was optionally covered in leather. The metal trim was given a wood-grain finish. The car was considered well equipped in 1952, with a "heating and demisting unit" fitted as standard.

The SM1500 as well as spacious and stable was sturdy and reliable but all the controls were too heavy for most women and the steering column gear change defeated many. At first, it sold well and was used by some police forces. It became a popular choice for provincial taxis but in the longer term there were fewer and fewer buyers. Full-width bodies became common and the car was over-priced.

=== Face-lift ===
In 1952 the car was face-lifted with a reworked grille and raised headlamps. Offered only as an optional extra was leather upholstery for slightly less than £39 (UK market). Otherwise the interior trim used Vynide, "a plastic material".

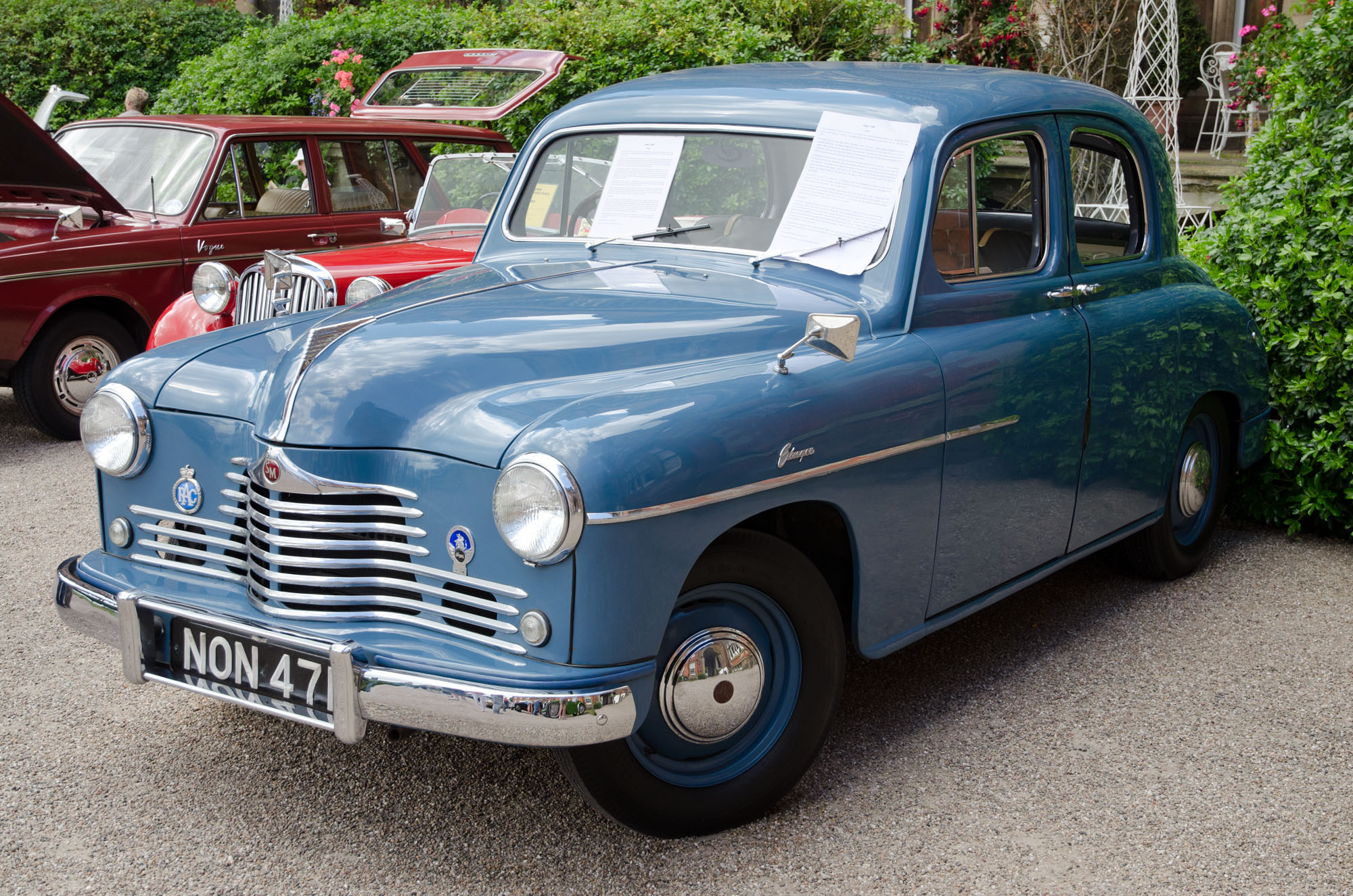
raised headlamps, wider grille

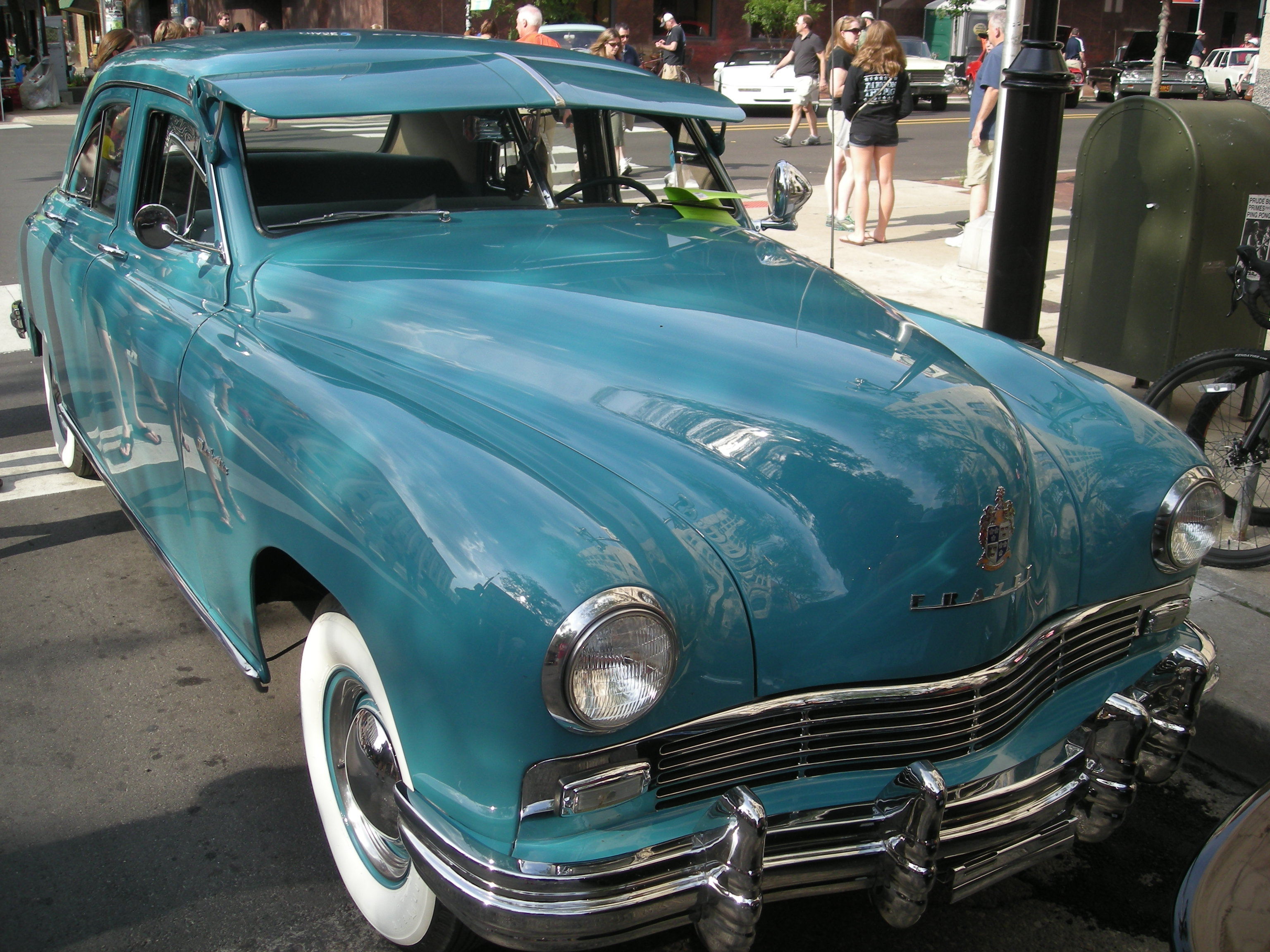
1948 (Kaiser-) Frazer Manhattan

A twin-carb version tested by The Motor magazine in 1952 had a top speed of 76 mph (122 km/h) and could accelerate from 0-60 mph (97 km/h) in 23.5 seconds. A fuel consumption of 22.5 miles per imperial gallon (12.6 L/100 km; 18.7 mpg_{‑US}) was recorded. The test car cost £1168 including taxes. A single carb version tested by The Autocar Magazine that same year managed a top speed of only 71 mph (114 km/h), a 0-60 mph (97 km/h) time of 27.9 seconds and an impressive overall fuel consumption figure for the road test of 29 miles per imperial gallon (9.7 L/100 km; 24 mpg_{‑US}).

A coupé utility variant was produced. It was advertised in Australia as "specially designed for Australian conditions".

17,382 SM1500 cars were made.

== Singer Hunter ==
Singer Hunter
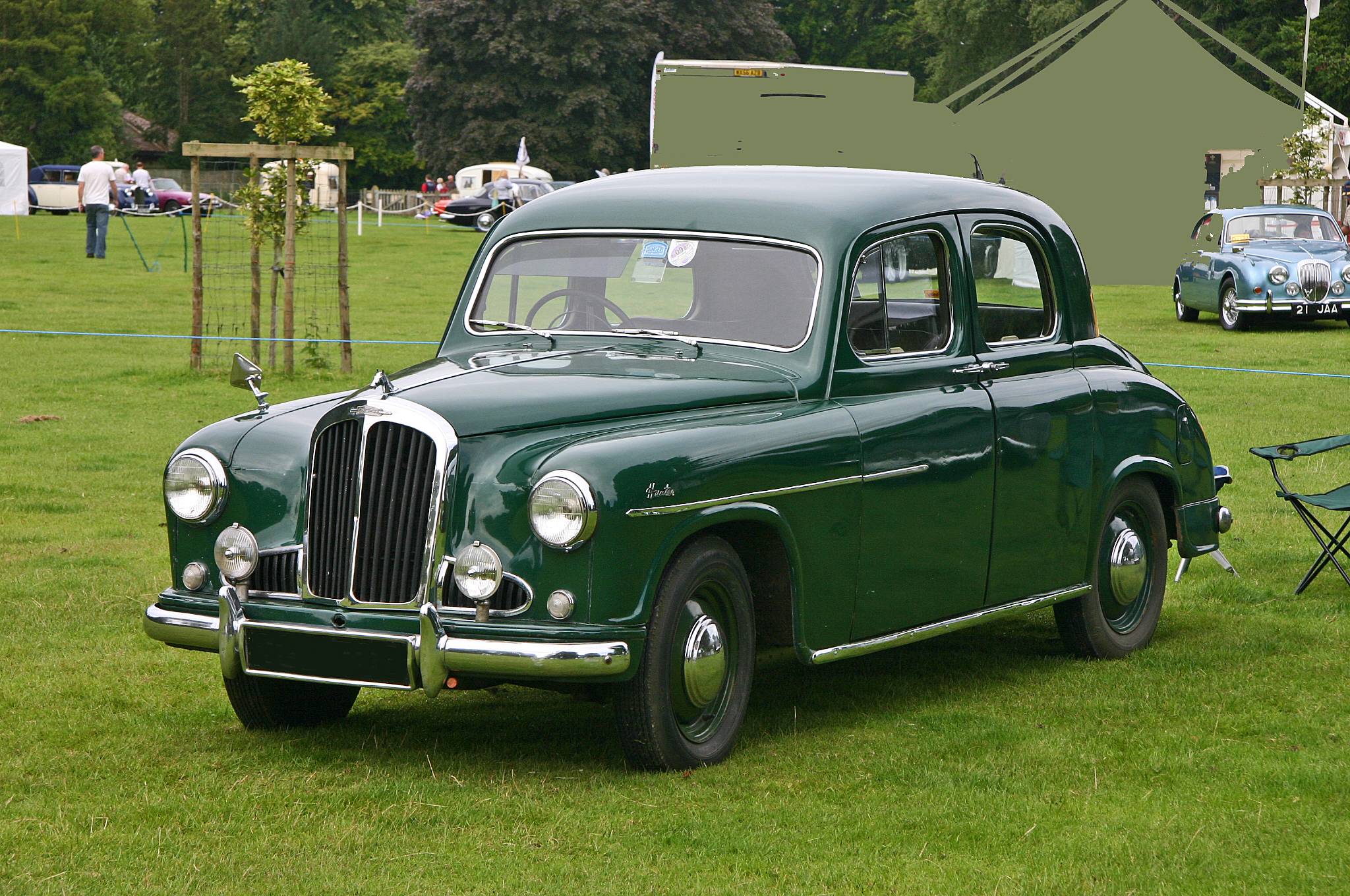
- Singer Hunter

Overview
- Manufacturer: Singer Motors Limited
- Also called: Singer 14/50 (Australia)
- Production: 1954-1956; 4,750 produced

Body and chassis
- Class: Large family car (D)
- Body style: 4-door saloon

Powertrain
- Engine: 1,497 cc overhead cam

Chronology
- Predecessor: Singer SM1500
- Successor: Singer Gazelle

In September 1954 the car was re-branded as the Singer Hunter with a traditional radiator grille and fibreglass bonnet lid. The Hunter was well equipped with twin horns and screenwash as standard. A horse-head mascot was fitted over the radiator. 4772 Hunters were made.

The Times motoring correspondent tested the new model and reported in June 1955, under the headline "Reversion to "Traditional" Radiator Shell" followed by "Cushioned Comfort", that this car was intended for the motorists who are prepared to pay for a rather better finish and more complete equipment than usually available in cars of this size.

He remarked that the Singer was unusual in having a completely flat windscreen — less expensive to replace — and a good view through it was spoiled by unusually thick pillars, door surround and ventilator window surround. He put the car's fast cruising speed at 67 mph. Top gear acceleration was excellent and the engine quiet beneath its plastic bonnet. The steering column gear lever was "rather stiff". A central old-fashioned floor-mounted lever was now available.

The car's outstanding feature was its springing, its ride smoother than most cars provide.

=== Hunter S and Hunter 75 ===
New models were announced for the October 1955 Earls Court Motor Show, a more basic model, the Hunter S, and a more powerful Hunter 75 which had a twin overhead camshaft engine (using an HRG designed cylinder head). Very few, possibly 20, of the 75s were made before the range was cancelled. The Singer Gazelle was announced in September 1956 but the Hunter remained available.

Singer Hunter

The Hunter name was revived by Rootes in 1966 for their Rootes Arrow range, in the form of the Hillman Hunter.

== In popular culture ==
A Hunter appears in the film Fire Maidens from Outer Space by Cy Roth, which has been called one of the worst films ever made by some critics.
