= Singer Twelve =

The Singer Twelve name was used for several automobiles produced by Singer Motors. The "Twelve" in the name referred to the taxation horsepower rating in the United Kingdom.

== Singer Twelve-Six (1932) ==
The Twelve-Six was powered by a 1476 cc six-cylinder side-valve engine and was available as either a four-door saloon or four-seat open tourer. A four-speed transmission was fitted.

== Singer Twelve-Four (1933-1934) ==
The new version of the Twelve used a four-cylinder 1440 cc side valve engine, essentially an enlarged version of that fitted to the 1931 Singer Ten. Drive was to the rear axle via a four-speed transmission. Braking was at first by a mechanical system replaced by hydraulics in 1934. It could be had in Saloon, Saloon de-luxe or coupe de luxe versions. The de-luxe option gave the owner all round safety glass, leather upholstery and bumpers. In 1934 the de-luxe also mfeatured clutchless gear changing.

The number made is not known.

== Singer Twelve (1937-1939) ==
The 1937 car had a 1525 cc overhead camshaft, four-cylinder engine. The car had a separate chassis that was conventional using beam axles and semi-elliptic leaf springs all round and hydraulic brakes. The wheels were of the pressed steel type. The car was available as a standard saloon, Super saloon (from 1938) or drophead coupe.

== Super Twelve (1947-1949) ==
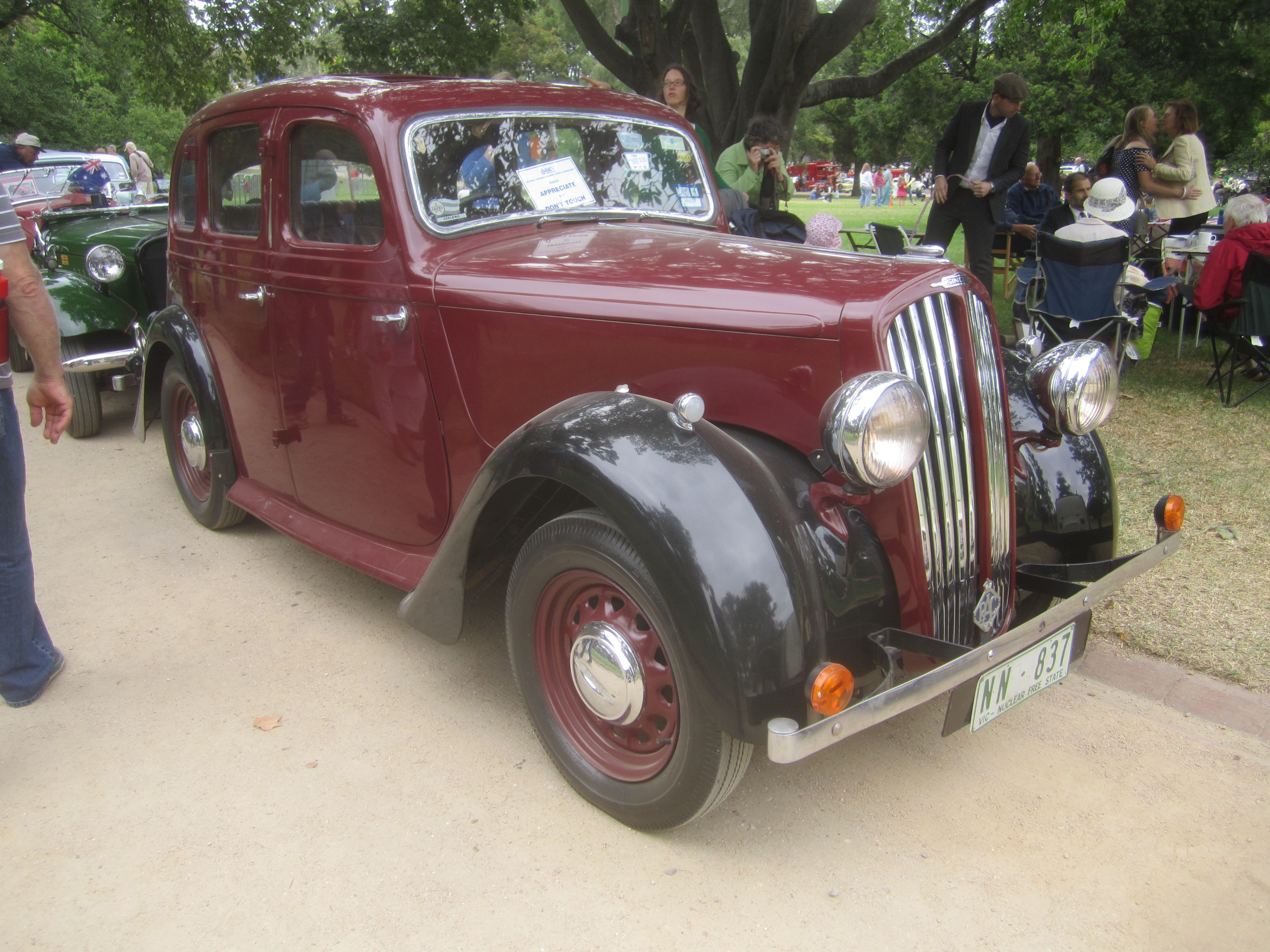
1949 Singer Super Twelve

After World War II the car was re-launched in 1947 as the Super Twelve with the drophead also still available. The standard saloon was no more.

A top speed of 68 mph (110 km/h) was possible.

1098 were built post war.
