= Beatrice Blore =

First woman to drive up the Great Orme

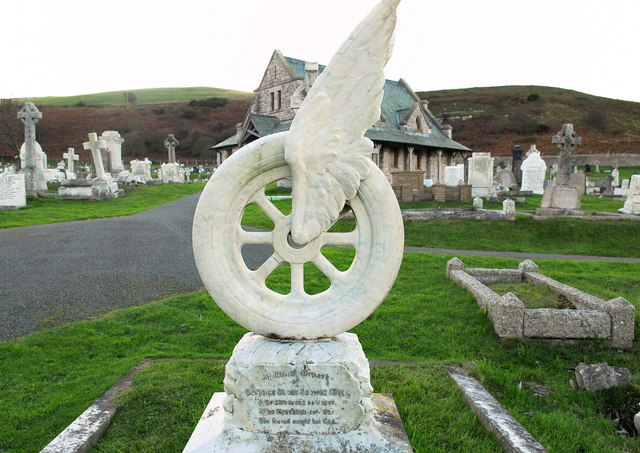
- Born: 26 December 1886; Middlesbrough
- Died: November 23, 1921 (aged 34); Penmaenmawr
- Burial place: St. Tudno's Church, Llandudno
- Other names: Beatrice Blore Browne
- Known for: First woman to drive a car up the Great Orme, Llandudno,

Beatrice Blore Browne (26 December 1886 – 23 November 1921) was the first woman to drive a car up the Great Orme, Llandudno, undertaking the feat in a Singer 10 on 11 July 1914 whilst six months pregnant.

== Early life ==
Beatrice Blore was born on 26 December 1886 in Middlesbrough to Annie (née Harrison) and Herbert Blore. She was known as “Bee” by her family. She had an older brother Arthur, and two older step siblings from her father’s first marriage. Her father worked in management of the pottery industry, was a Poor Law administrator and was involved in the local musical scene. The family lived in a middle-class area of the town. Herbert Blore died age only 49 in 1890.

Beatrice’s mother remarried in 1894 and had two more children. The family moved to Llandudno, a seaside tourist town in North Wales in 1900 after her stepfather Edward Leach got a job as Chief Electrician for the Llandudno Pier, which was part of the town’s tourism offer. He installed its first set of electrical lights and ran a company which installed electricity into houses, at the time it was a new, cutting edge technology. After a fire in 1908, the Leaches moved to Weston-super-Mare but Beatrice and her older brother Arthur remained in Llandudno.

== Adult life ==
Beatrice got a job as a housekeeper/companion to Dr. William Nicol, a widowed medical practitioner with a range of business interests in the town including the Llandudno Pier Company and the North Wales Silver Motor Company. One of his colleagues in the latter business was George Wilkin Browne.

The Silver Motor Company sold cars and ran taxi and bus services and George Browne had a reputation for driving racing cars. It was believed in the locality that he held a track speed record at the Brooklands racecourse. He applied to become a member of the Institute of Mechanical Engineers in 1910. He also had a previous career in Manchester that ended in two court cases, and a wife and two children who did not join him in Llandudno. Beatrice Blore and George Browne began a relationship in the early 1910s, having met through her employer.

By January 1914, Beatrice Blore was pregnant with Browne’s child. As he was still married to his first wife, they were not able to marry. In May, Browne was appointed Managing Director of the North Wales Silver Motors Ltd at £500 a year and a profit share.

== Driving up the Great Orme ==
In June 1914, Browne dreamt up a marketing campaign to sell Singer 10 (10 horse power) cars, a popular model with a good reputation for climbing hills and speed. They cost £195. Browne had entered the cars in races at Colwyn Bay and had either won or came second, and used the results in the garage's marketing. Wanting to build on the success of this marketing campaign, he then decided that getting his partner Beatrice Blore to drive up Llandudno’s Great Orme, a headland with a 1 in 3 incline would be real proof of the car’s efficiency. The Great Orme Tramway opened in 1902 to aid tourists ascend the very steep slopes. Women motorists were still rare and subject to a lot of media interest.

On 11 July 1914, a crowd gathered to watch Beatrice Blore drive a Singer 10 up the Great Orme. By this date, she was 6 months pregnant. She succeeded in the difficult drive and the car she drove was subsequently displayed at the garage.

== Later life ==
Three months later on 25 October 1914, Beatrice Blore gave birth to her daughter Beatrice Browne in Prestatyn. By this time, despite her driving feat and the publicity around it, George’s business had got into trouble and he was listed as a Commercial Traveller on the birth certificate.

The couple stayed together but Beatrice only took his surname by deed poll six years later, when she was diagnosed with breast cancer. It is assumed that she did this to give her daughter an element of legal protection after her death.

Beatrice Blore Brown died in Penmaenmawr on 23 November 1921, aged only 34. Her younger step brother Henry Leach was with her when she died. She left everything (£550) to her daughter and George Browne was appointed as executor. Beatrice was buried in the churchyard of St. Tudno’s church on the Great Orme.

== Legacy ==
George Browne commissioned a winged wheel memorial stone in her memory, but got her birth date wrong on the inscription. It reads 26 September 1887 rather than 26 December 1886. Family legend states that he sent the bill to Beatrice’s relatives as a pointed gesture about their lack of support since she had her daughter out of wedlock.

Local legends explained the dramatic gravestone as commemorating her death when riding a motorcycle or in a car crash.

A prize has been given in Beatrice Blore Browne’s name at the Churchill College Boat Club at Cambridge University for the member who rowed in the first boat in the May Races and received the best examination results of the team. Her name was suggested by her great niece Marcia Miller (née Blore), daughter of Arthur Blore.
