= Singer Gazelle =

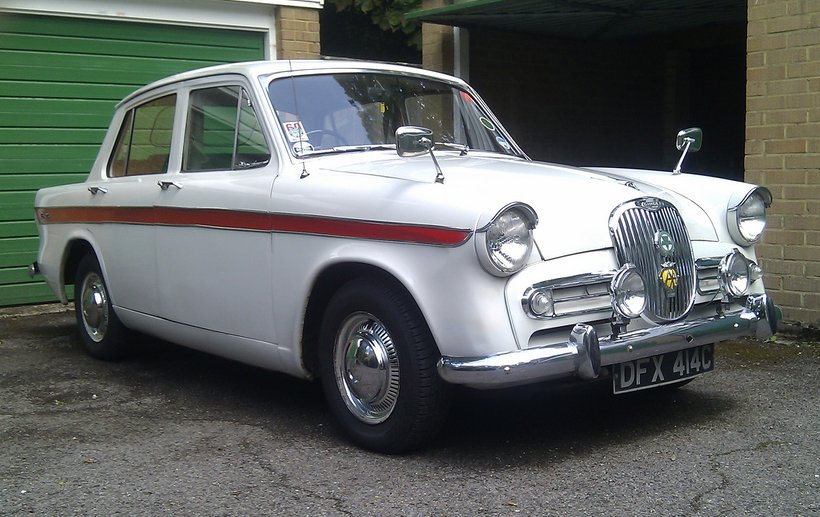
- Singer Gazelle V

Overview
- Manufacturer: Singer (Rootes Group)
- Production: 1956–70

Body and chassis
- Body style: 4-door saloon 2-door convertible 4-door estate car
- Layout: Front-engine, rear-wheel-drive layout

Chronology
- Predecessor: Singer Hunter
- Successor: None

The Singer Gazelle name has been applied to two generations of motor cars from the British manufacturer Singer. It was positioned between the basic Hillman range and the more sporting Sunbeam versions.

== Gazelle I and II ==
Singer Gazelle I & II
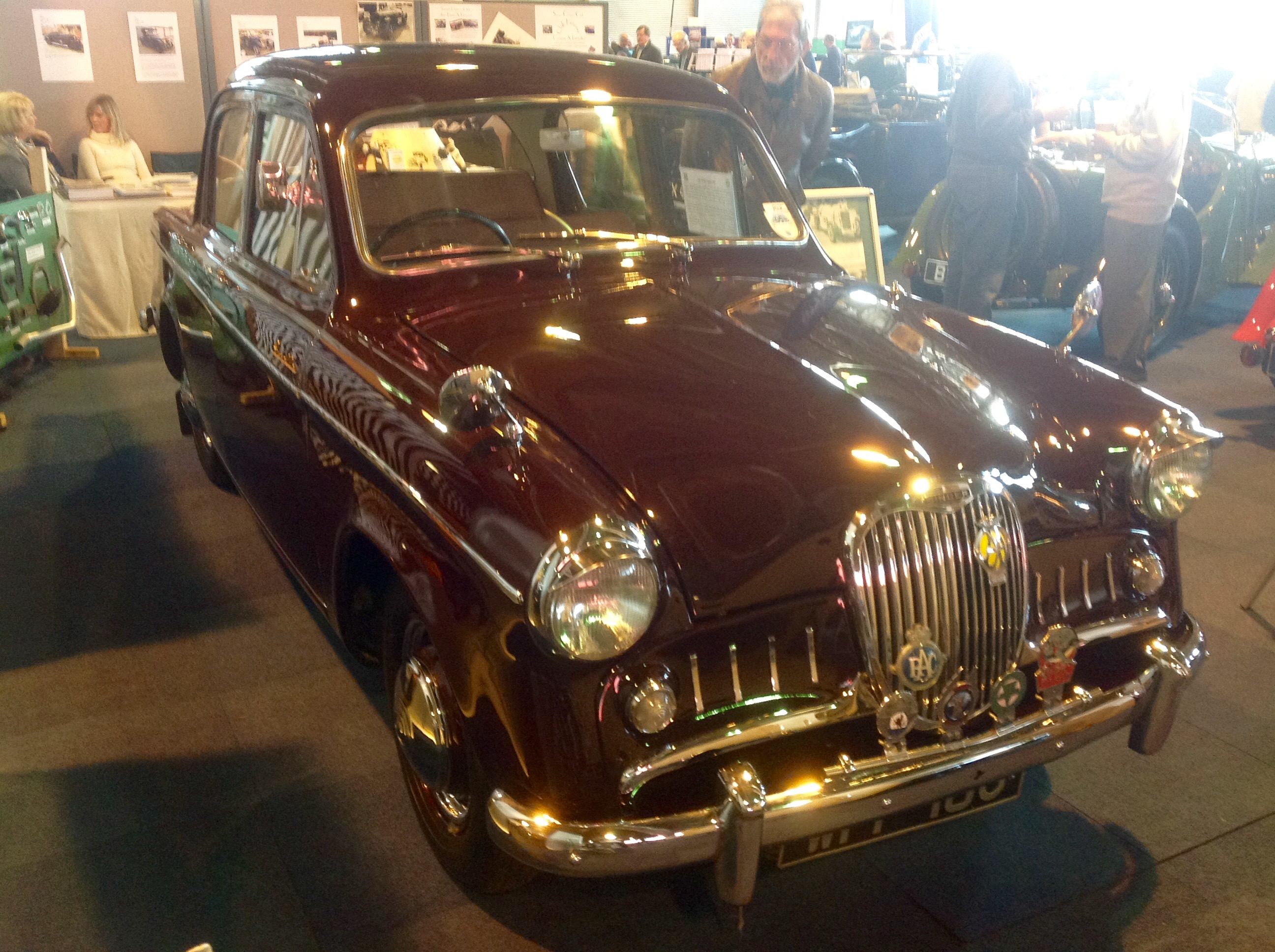
- Singer Gazelle I Saloon

Overview
- Production: 1956–58; 4,344 and 1,582 made

Body and chassis
- Body style: 4-door saloon 2-door convertible 4-door estate car

Powertrain
- Engine: 1497 cc straight-4 overhead cam
- Transmission: 4 speed manual with optional overdrive

Dimensions
- Wheelbase: 96 in (2,438 mm)
- Length: 163.5 in (4,153 mm)
- Width: 60.75 in (1,543 mm)
- Height: 60 in (1,524 mm)

Chronology
- Predecessor: Singer Hunter

The Gazelle was the first Singer to be produced following the take-over of the Singer company by the Rootes Group in 1956 and was a version of the mainstream Hillman Minx differing mainly in retaining the Singer overhead cam engine. Externally the only significant difference was a restyled nose based around a traditional Singer grille. The new car was announced in late September 1956.

The body style followed by the Gazelle between 1956 and 1967 came to be known as the "Audax" body, with significant input from the US based Loewy design organisation, highly regarded at the time partly on account of Loewy's input to several iconic Studebaker designs.

The Gazelle was initially offered in saloon and convertible body styles. The Gazelle Series II, offered from autumn 1957, was also available as an estate car, and had optional overdrive and larger fuel tank. For the Series II the front was changed to include horizontal chrome vents incorporating side lights and indicator lights on either side of the oval centre grille.

The suspension was independent at the front using coil springs while at the rear was a live axle and half elliptic leaf springs. The steering gear used a worm and nut system.

As standard, the car had a bench front seat but individual seats were available as an option. To allow for the bench seat, the handbrake lever was between the seat and the door.

The convertible version had a two position hood where it could be either completely lowered or rolled back to just behind the front seats described as the coupé de ville position. All side windows could be completely lowered. To compensate for the loss of body rigidity by the removal of the roof, extra cross bracing was fitted under the car.

A car with overdrive was tested by the British magazine The Motor in 1957. It had a top speed of 78.0 mph (125.5 km/h) and could accelerate from 0-60 mph (97 km/h) in 24.8 seconds. A fuel consumption of 33.5 miles per imperial gallon (8.4 L/100 km; 27.9 mpg_{‑US}) was recorded. The test car cost £1016 including taxes of £332. This included the optional overdrive, heater and radio.

== Gazelle IIA to IIIC ==
Singer Gazelle IIA to IIIC
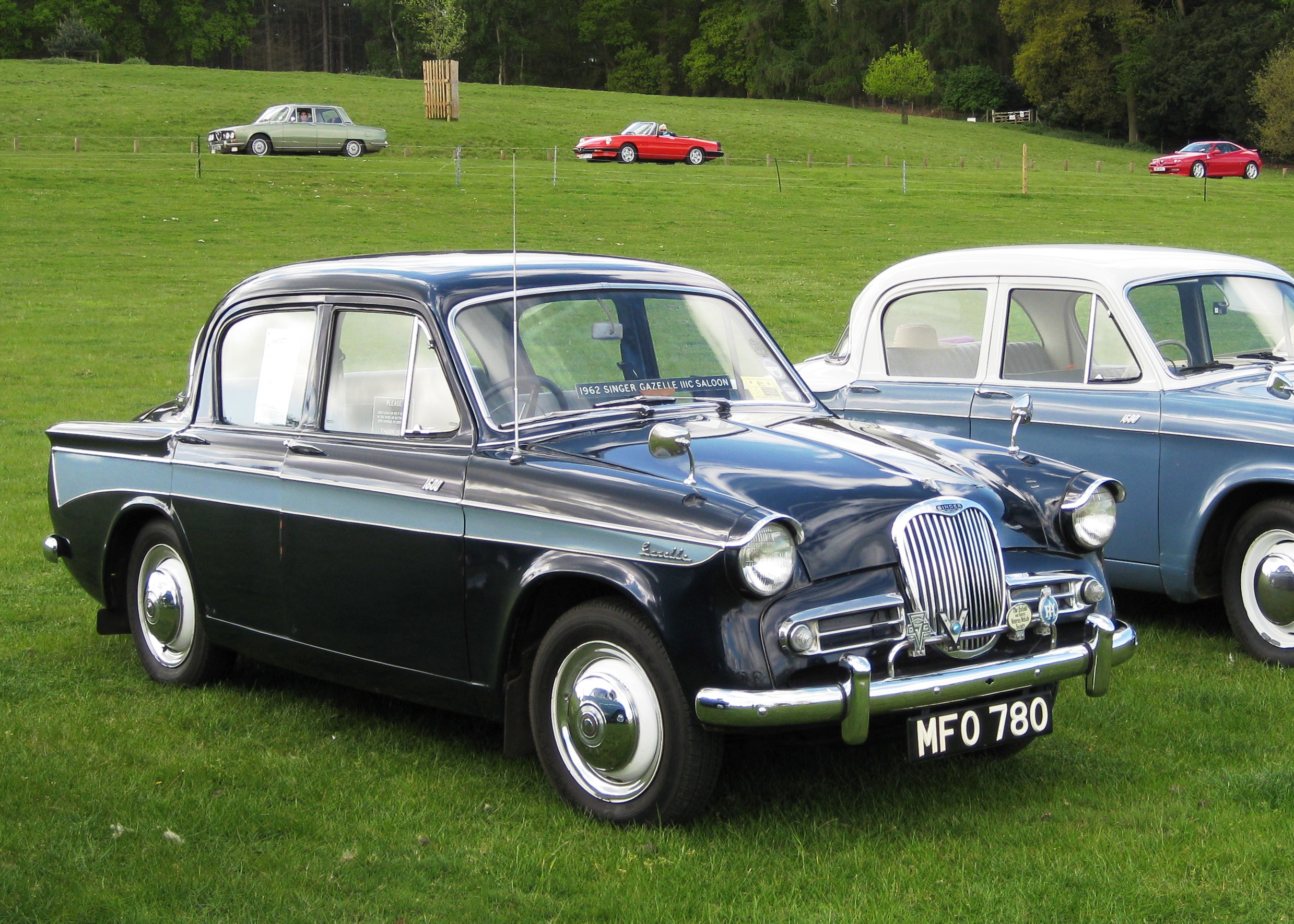
- Singer Gazelle IIIC Saloon of 1962

Overview
- Production: 1958–63; 3,824, 10,929, 12,491, 13,272 and 15,115 made

Body and chassis
- Body style: 4-door saloon 2-door convertible 4-door estate car

Powertrain
- Engine: 1494 cc (1592 cc on the IIIC) straight-4 overhead valve
- Transmission: 4 speed manual with optional overdrive or automatic

Dimensions
- Wheelbase: 96 in (2,438 mm)
- Length: 163.5 in (4,153 mm)
- Width: 60.75 in (1,543 mm)
- Height: 57.25 in (1,454 mm)

The Gazelle II was re-designated as the IIA in 1958. The standard Hillman pushrod overhead valve engine replaced the Singer overhead cam unit. The new engine was more powerful, developing 56 bhp against 49 bhp.

In line with Rootes Group policy, the car kept getting small upgrades each with a new designation. In September 1958 the Gazelle, now re-designated III, received better seats, enhanced at the front by a folding central arm rest. A new two-tone paint became available with this upgrade.

The IIIA, introduced September 1959, gained small tail fins and a larger windscreen. The engine was upgraded with twin Solex carburettors replacing the single Solex, distinguishing it from the Minx, and lifting output to 60 bhp. Home market cars got a floor gear change and as well as overdrive, Smith's Easidrive automatic transmission also became an option.

Autocar Magazine carried out a Used Car Test, No.214 in their famous series, on a Singer Gazelle III first registered on 2 January 1961. What is not made clear is whether this was a Gazelle IIIb or an earlier Gazelle IIIa model, fitted with the twin carburettors. In comparison with the new Gazelle IIIb tested on 17 March 1961, it reached 0-60 mph in 23.9secs, compared with the used car at only 19.9secs. A 4sec saving. The standing quarter mile was also covered in 21.3sec. compared with 22.2 for the new IIIb model.

The IIIB, launched September 1960, reverted to a single carburettor which improved fuel consumption and facilitated servicing "in remoter territories". The IIIB also received a new back axle featuring a hypoid bevel in place of the former model's spiral bevel.

The IIIC, launched July 1961, was fitted with a larger engine of 1592 cc developing 53 bhp. The convertible was discontinued in February 1962 followed by the estate car in March 1962.

A Series III convertible with the 1494 cc engine was tested by The Motor in 1959. It was recorded as having a top speed of 83.4 mph (134.2 km/h) and could accelerate from 0-60 mph (97 km/h) in 21.2 seconds. A fuel consumption of 32.5 miles per imperial gallon (8.7 L/100 km; 27.1 mpg_{‑US}) was recorded. The test car cost £1,003 including taxes of £295. This included the optional overdrive. The convertible cost £67 more than the saloon.

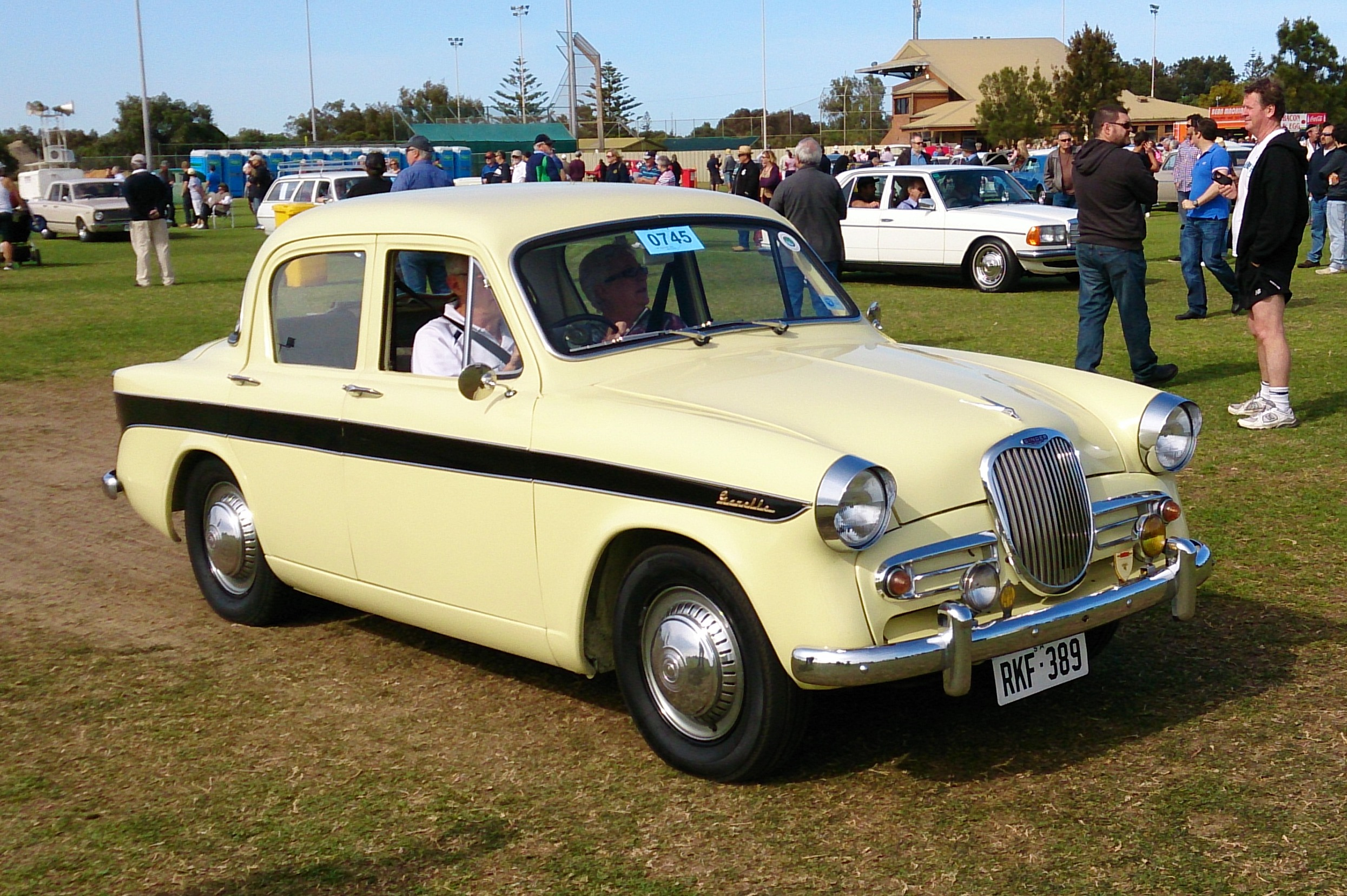
Singer Gazelle III Saloon

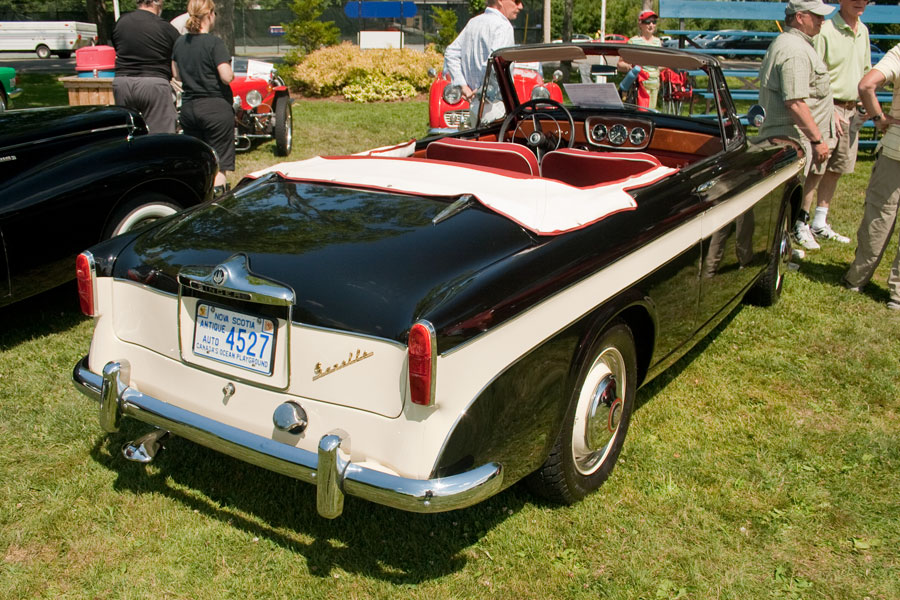
Singer Gazelle III Convertible

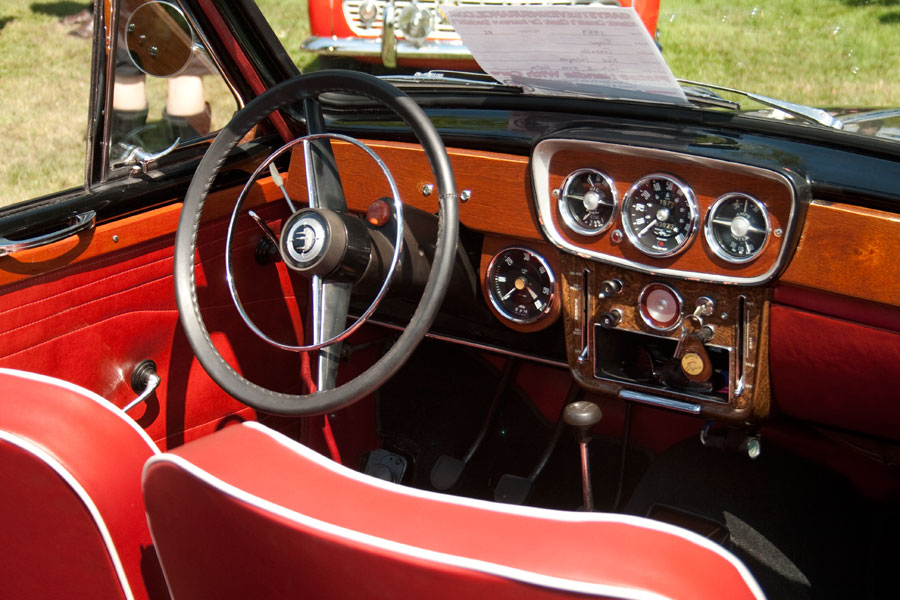
Singer Gazelle III Convertible

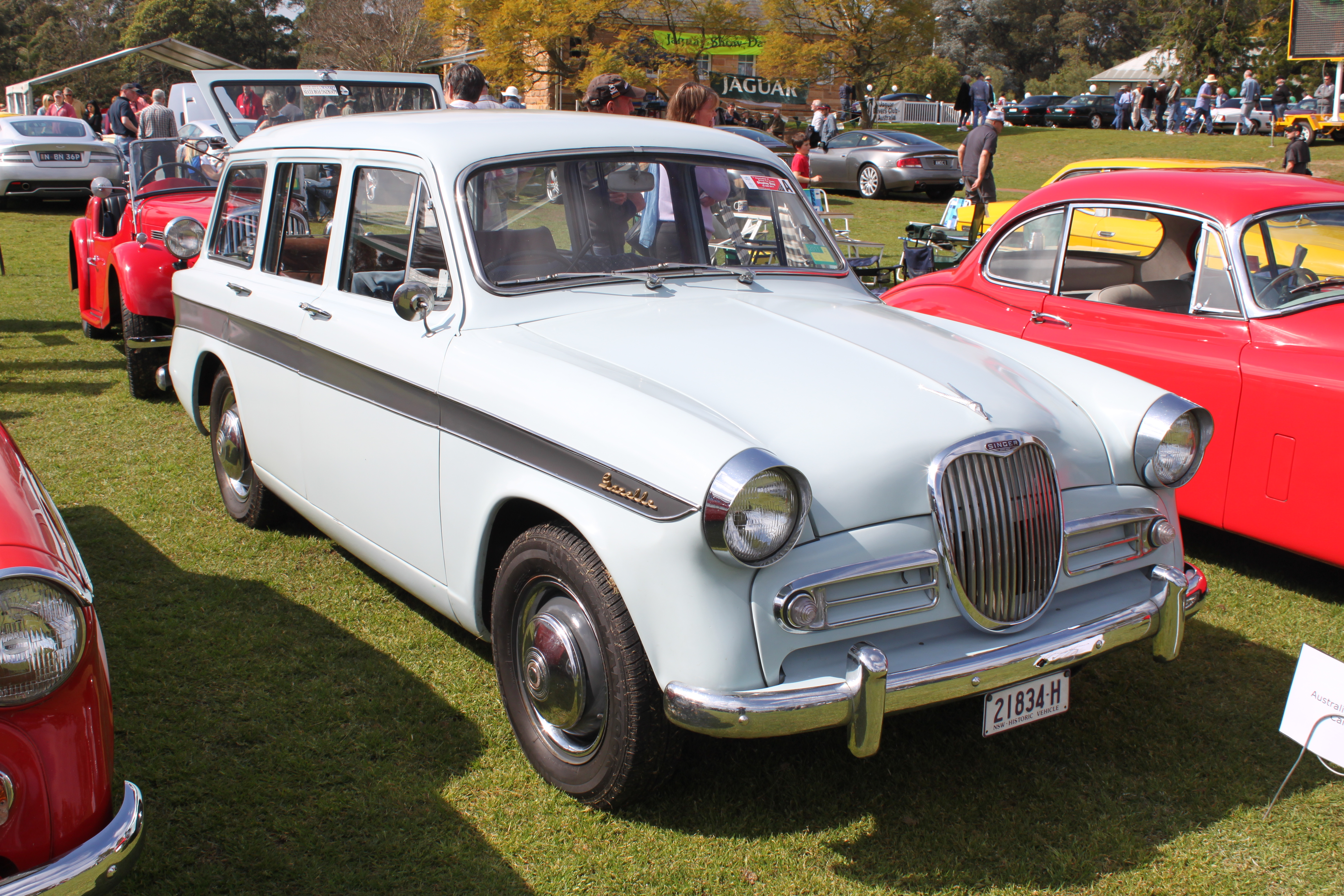
Singer Gazelle III Station Wagon (Australia)

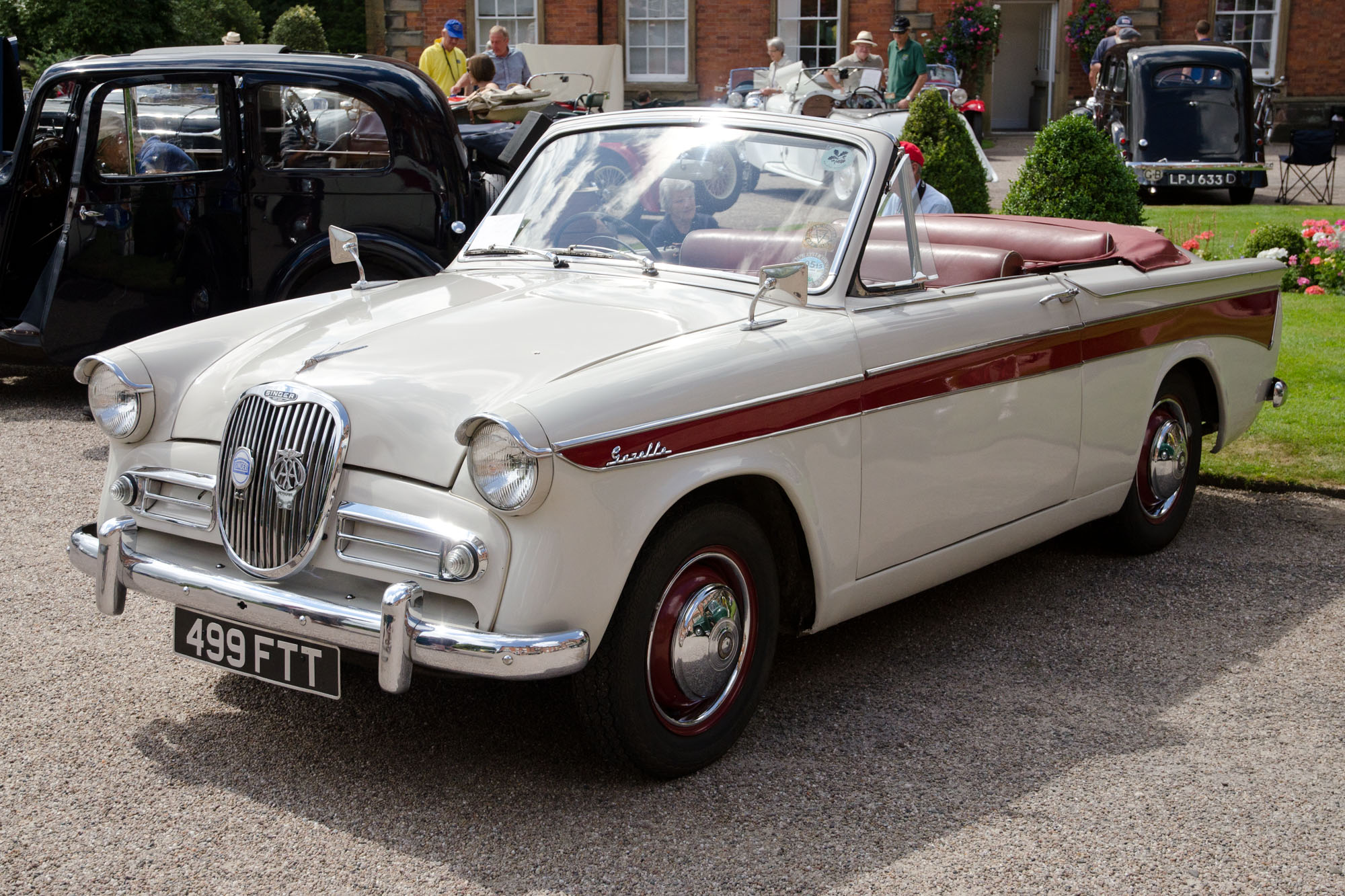
Singer Gazelle IIIA Convertible of 1960

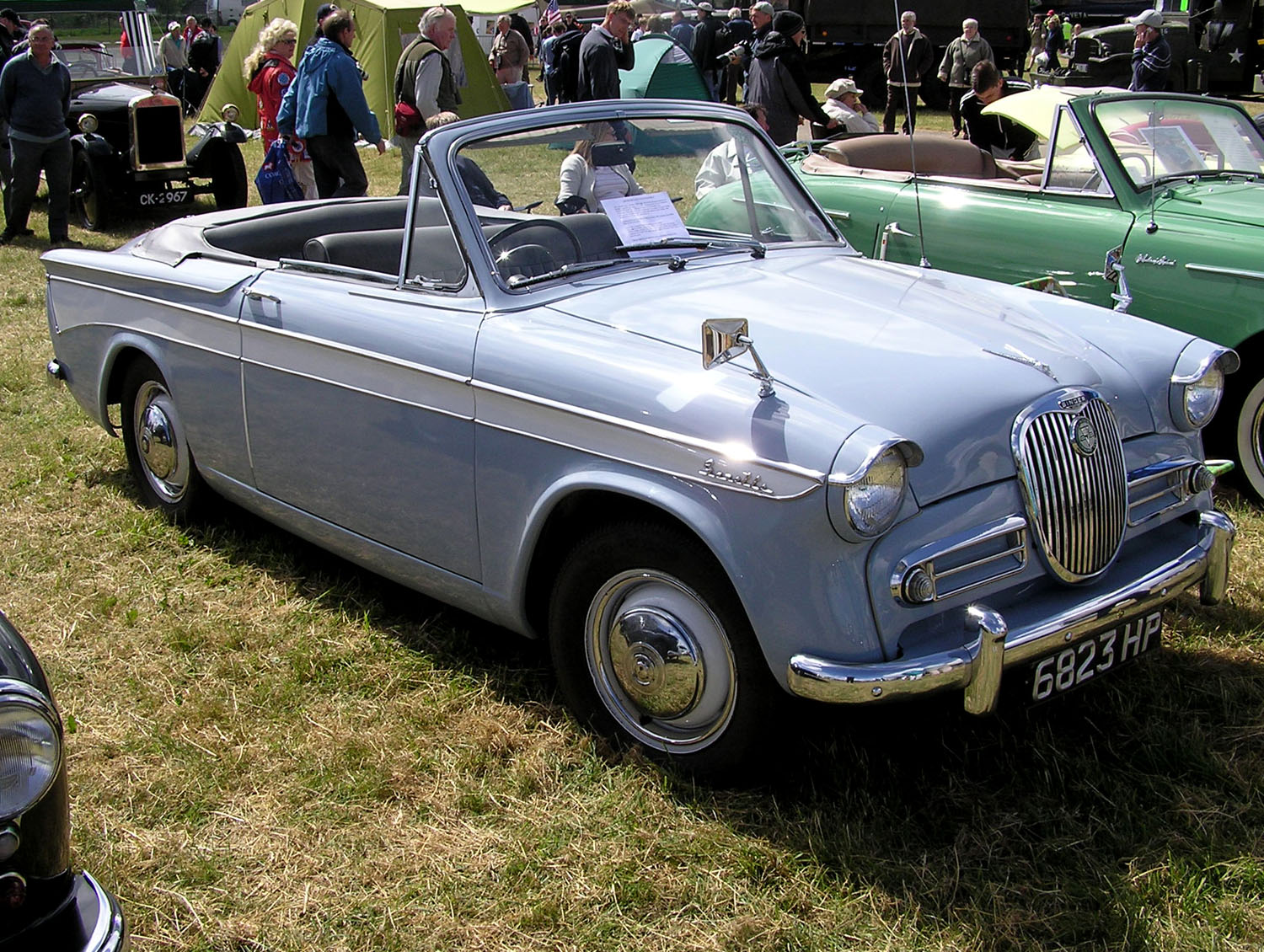
Singer Gazelle IIIB Convertible of 1960

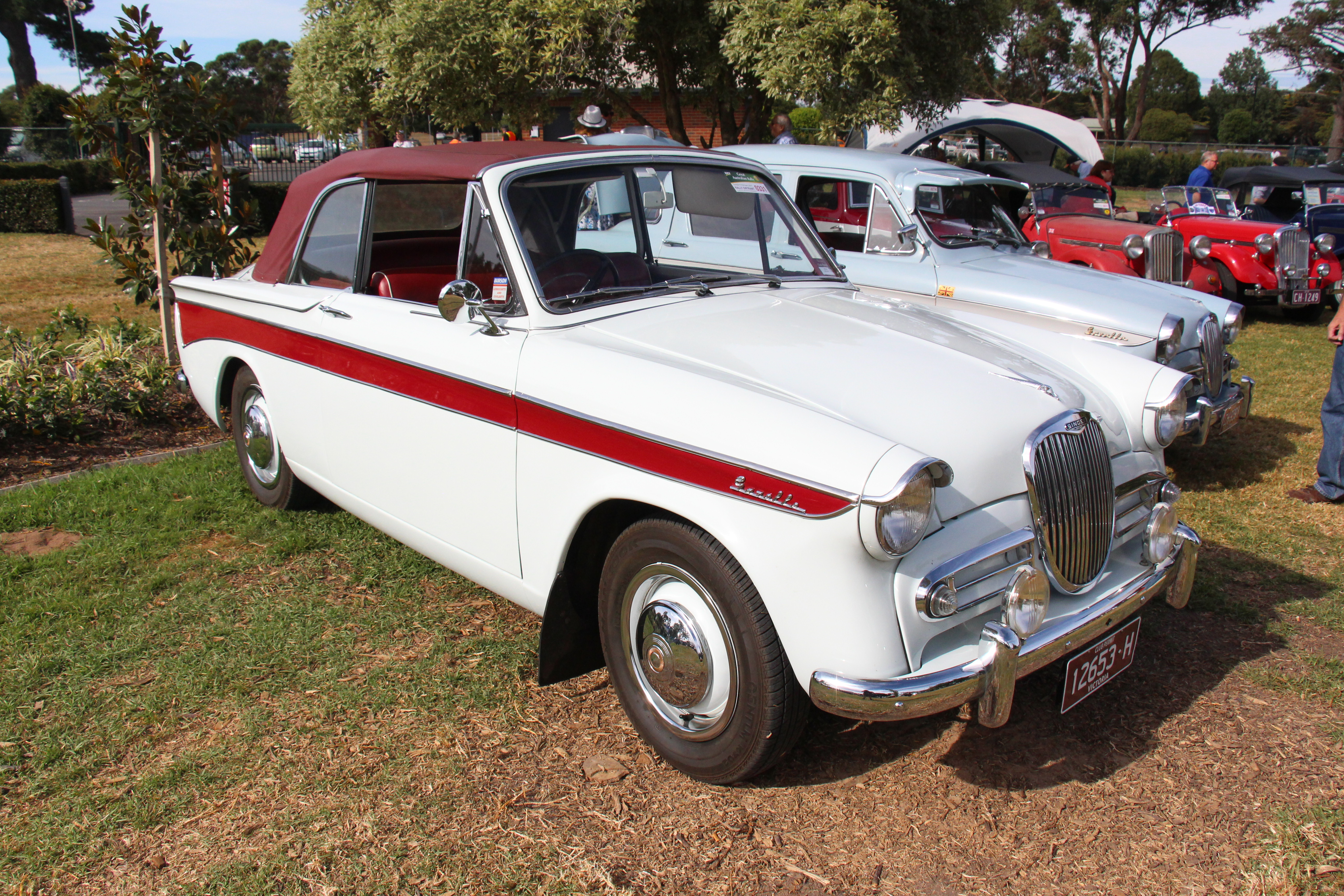
Singer Gazelle IIIC Convertible

== Gazelle IV ==
In July 1961 the Rootes Group released the new Singer Vogue, using the body of what was intended to be the Gazelle IV. As a consequence, the Gazelle IV designation was not used.

== Gazelle V ==
Singer Gazelle V
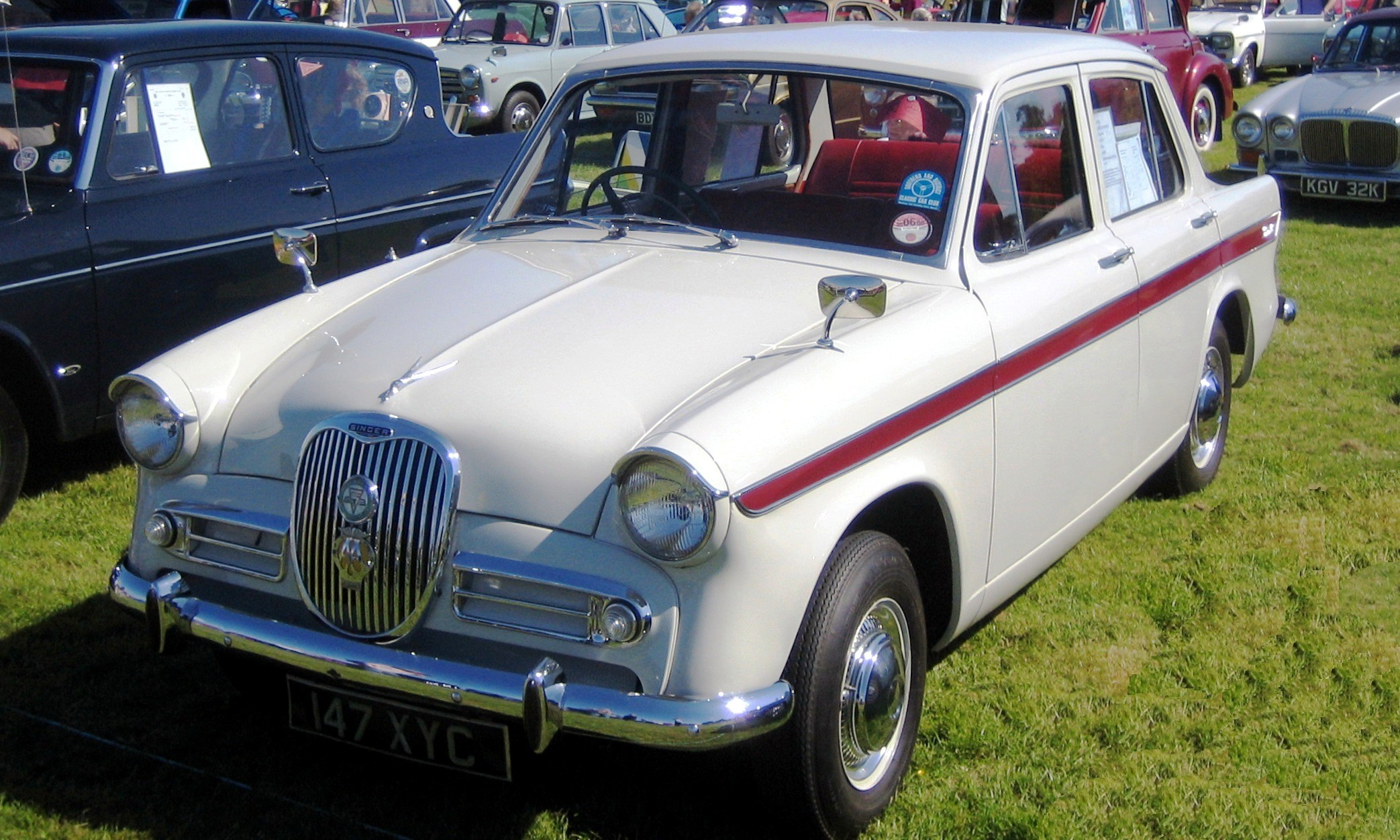
- Singer Gazelle V

Overview
- Production: 1963–65; 20,022 made

Body and chassis
- Body style: 4-door saloon

Powertrain
- Engine: 1592 cc straight-4 overhead valve
- Transmission: 4 speed manual with optional overdrive or automatic

Dimensions
- Wheelbase: 96 in (2,438 mm)
- Length: 164.5 in (4,178 mm)
- Width: 60.75 in (1,543 mm)

The Gazelle V was introduced in August 1963, following the Hillman Minx update. It had an updated body with longer rear doors and no longer having a wrap-around rear window.

The front brakes became discs and from 1964 it gained a new gearbox with synchromesh on first gear. The optional Borg Warner automatic got a floor mounted selector lever.

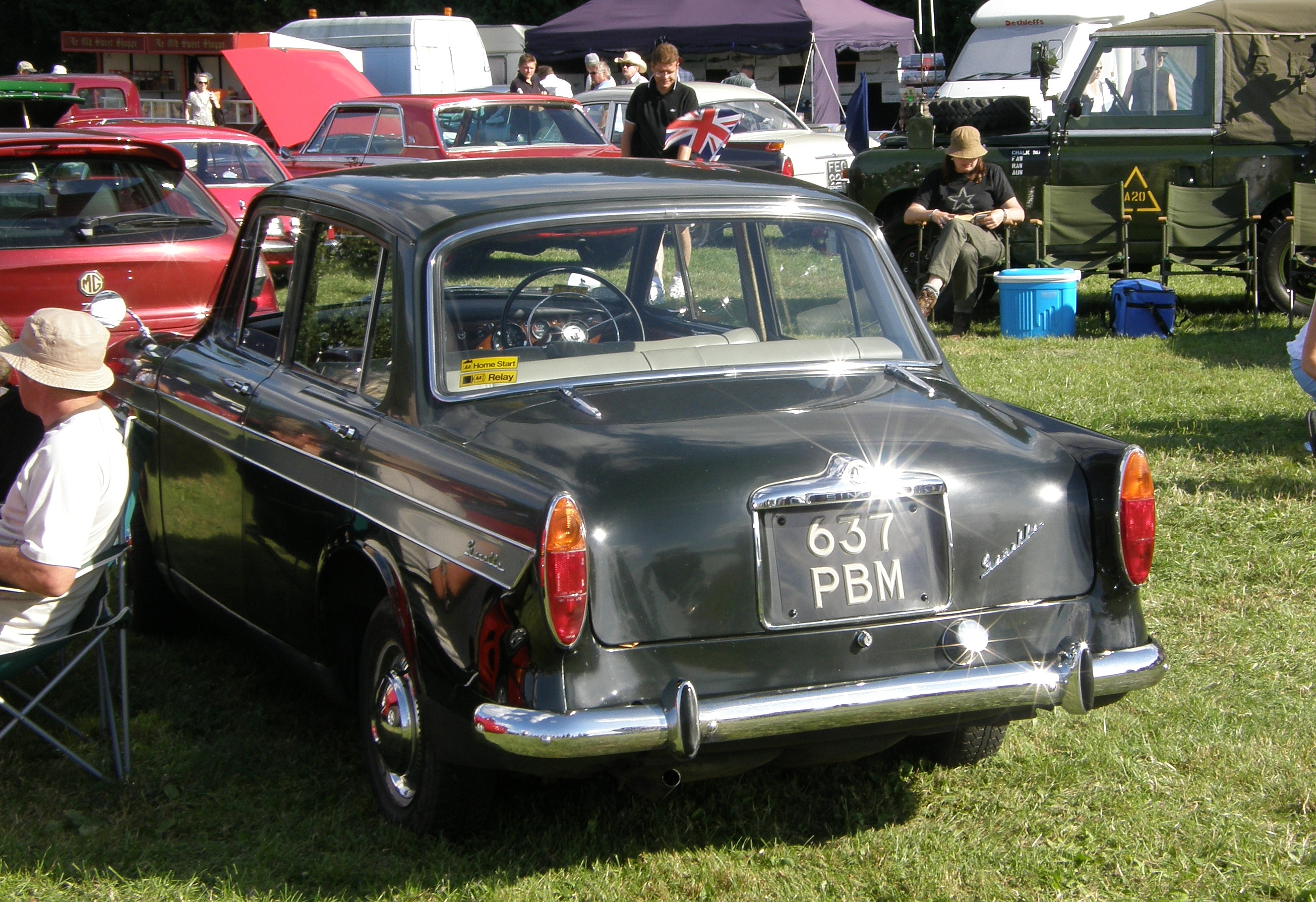
Singer Gazelle V of 1964

== Gazelle VI ==
Singer Gazelle VI
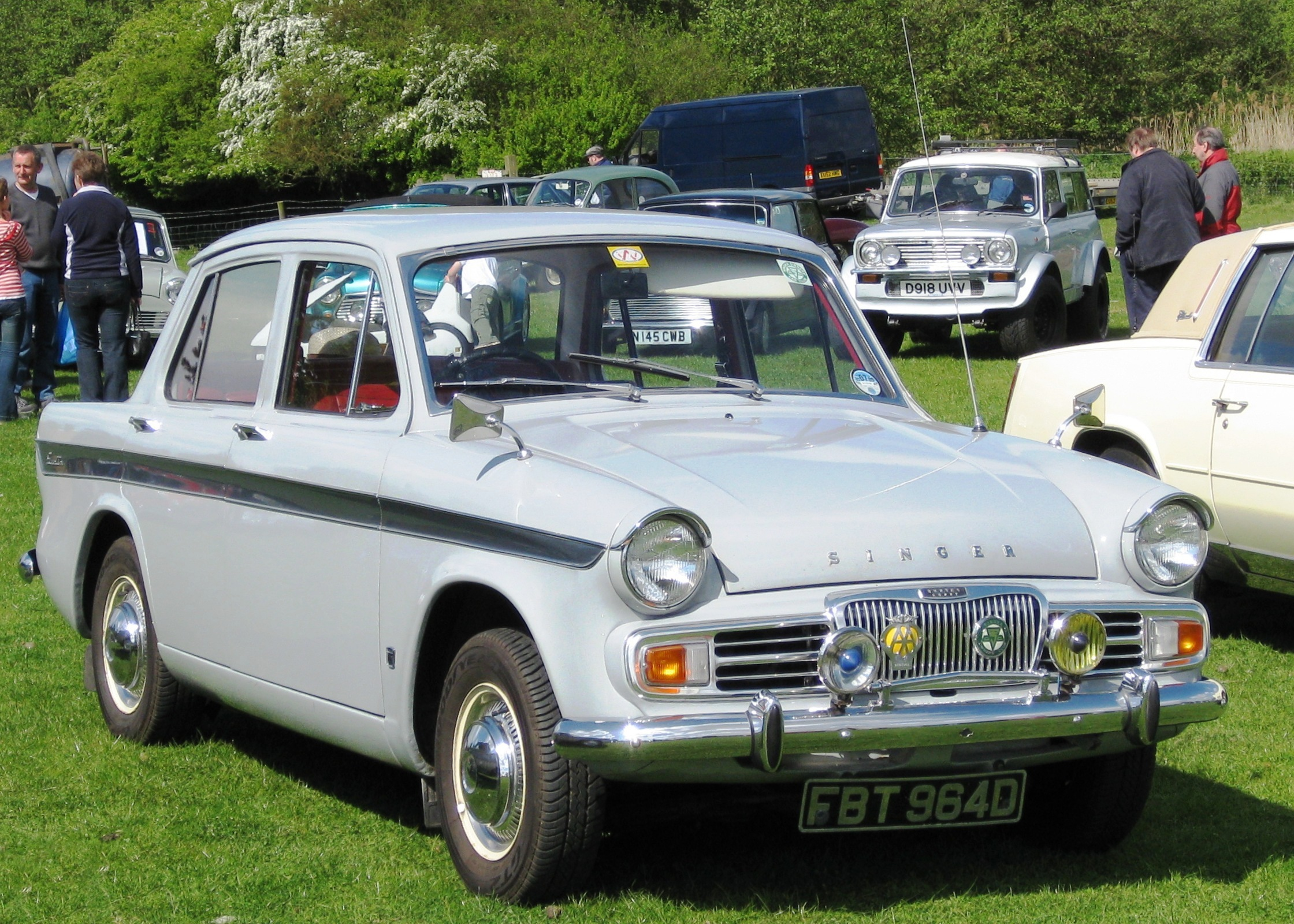
- Singer Gazelle VI

Overview
- Production: 1965–67; 14,842 produced

Body and chassis
- Body style: 4-door saloon

Powertrain
- Engine: 1725 cc straight-4 overhead valve
- Transmission: 4 speed manual with optional overdrive or automatic

Dimensions
- Wheelbase: 96 in (2,438 mm)
- Length: 166.5 in (4,229 mm)
- Width: 61.75 in (1,568 mm)

The Gazelle VI, which was introduced in 1965, was the last of the "Audax" Gazelles. The engine was all new, with a five-bearing crankshaft and capacity of 1725 cc at first developing 65 bhp but this was later reduced to 59 bhp.

The grille, now rectangular instead of the traditional Singer oval shape, was no longer attached to the opening bonnet but remained fixed to the front panels on opening.

== Gazelle VII ==
Singer Gazelle VII
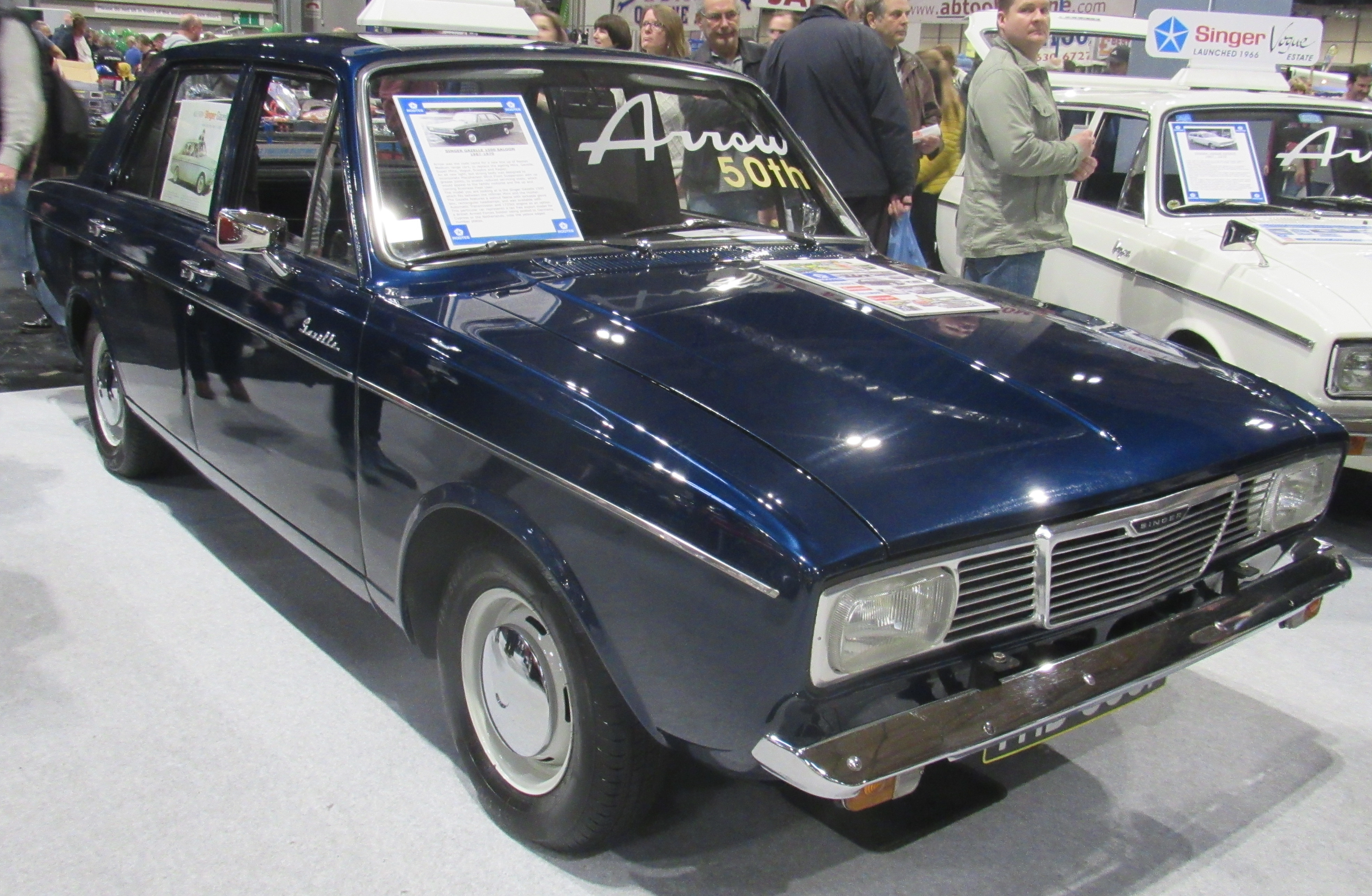
- Singer Gazelle VII

Overview
- Production: 1967–70; 26,846 produced

Body and chassis
- Body style: 4-door saloon
- Related: Hillman Hunter; Singer Vogue

Powertrain
- Engine: 1496 cc straight-4 1725 cc straight-4
- Transmission: manual automatic

The Gazelle VII was introduced in 1967 as one of numerous models in the Rootes Arrow range. It was offered only as a 4 door saloon. Initially available only with automatic transmission and a 1725cc engine, subsequently a manual transmission variant with the 1496 cc engine was introduced. Production ceased in 1970, the last example produced also being the last Singer to be built.

== Australian production ==
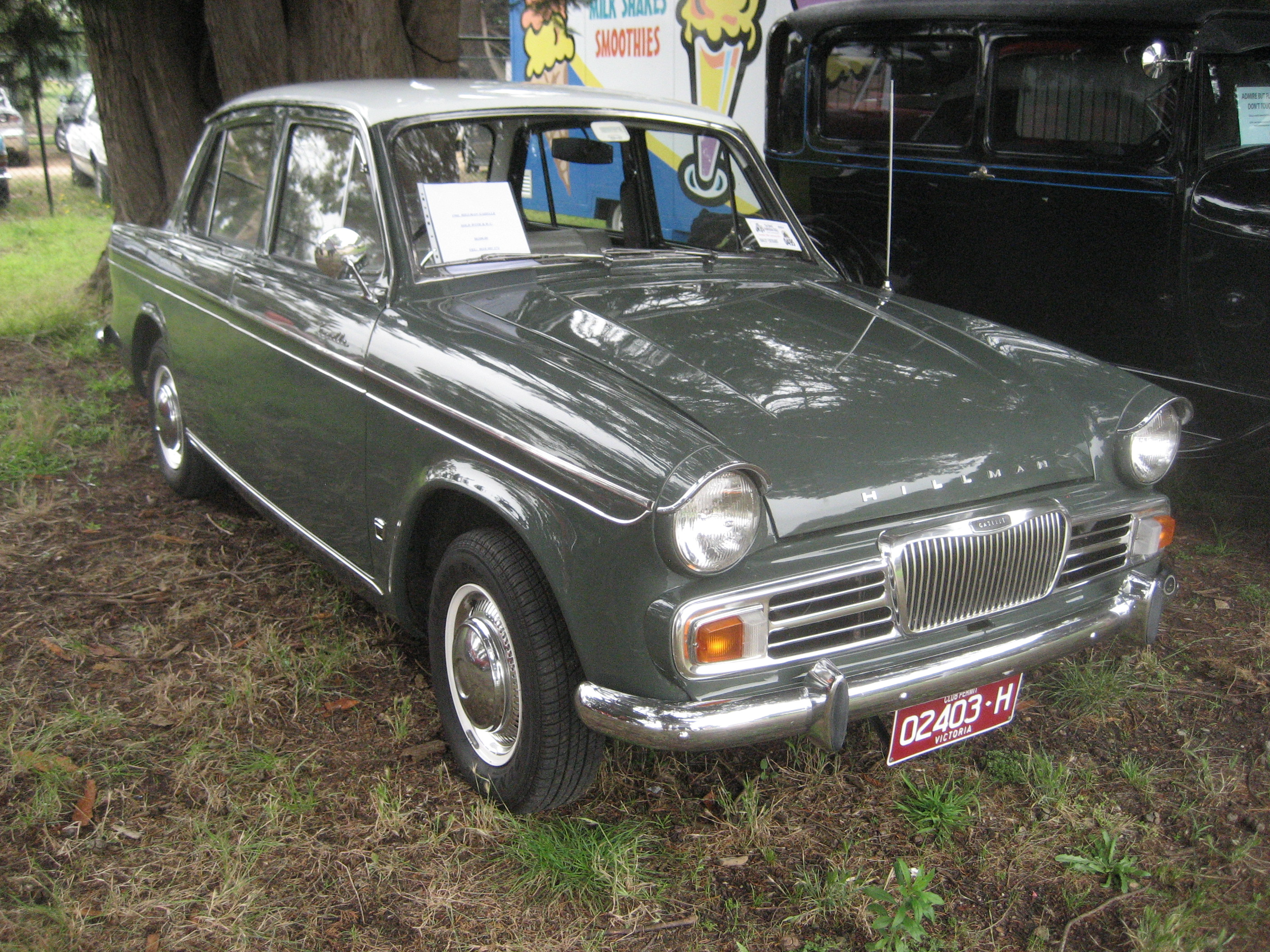
Hillman Gazelle

=== Singer Gazelle ===
The Singer Gazelle was also produced in Australia from 1957 to 1961 by Rootes Australia. It was offered in Sports Saloon, Station Wagon and Estate Van models.

=== Hillman Gazelle ===
Following the purchase of Rootes Australia in 1965, Chrysler Australia produced a variant of the Gazelle VI as the Hillman Gazelle.

== Scale models ==
- Meccano Dinky Toys; No. 168 (production 1959–63), Series 1 Gazelle, (1:44, approximately O scale).
