= Coventry Premier =

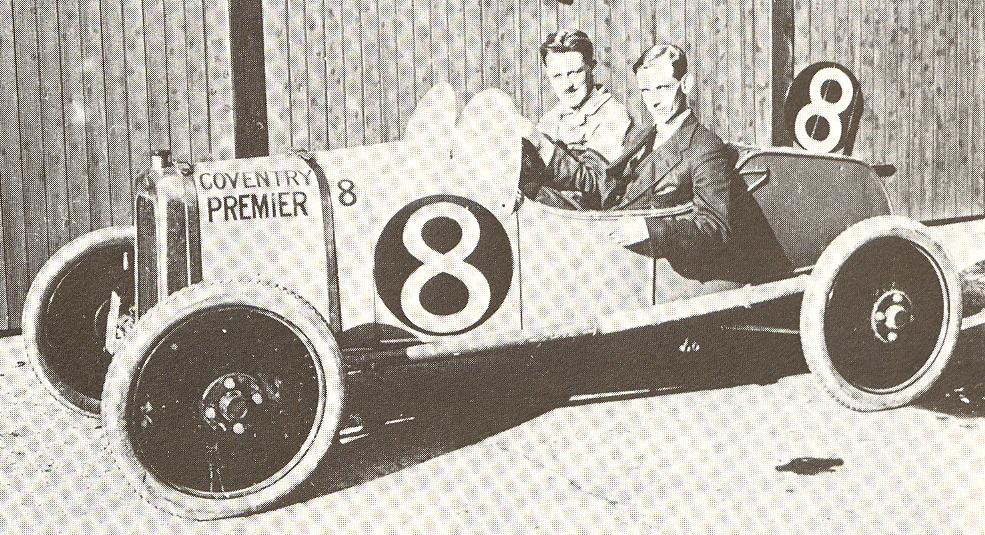
AJ (Jimmy) Dixon and his co-driver in a Coventry Premier at the 1921 200 mile race at Brooklands

Coventry Premier Limited owned a British car and cyclecar manufacturing business based in Coventry from 1912 to 1923. It changed its name from Premier Cycles to Coventry Premier Ltd in November 1914.

== Early Company History ==
The business can trace its origins back to 1875 when William Hillman and William Herbert formed Hillman & Herbert Cycle Co Ltd, as bicycle makers. They were joined in 1876 by George B Cooper and the company renamed Hillman, Herbert & Cooper Ltd, operating out of the Premier Works in Coventry, their Premier brand of cycles being very successful, with the factory covering 3 acres.

In 1891 The Premier Cycle Co Ltd was formed to take over Hillman, Herbert & Cooper as a going concern, however the Premier Cycle Co was wound up later that year. Some time later The New Premier Cycle Co was formed to acquire the business of The Premier Cycle Co. In 1902 this company renamed itself as The Premier Cycle Co Ltd.

In 1914 The Premier Cycle Co Ltd changed its name to Coventry Premier Ltd, and continued as such until sold to Singer in 1920. The Coventry Premier trademark continued to be used by Singer until c1927 when they ceased bicycle production.

William Hillman went on to set up his own Hillman car company in 1907.

== Premier Motorcycles ==
Hillman, Herbert & Cooper started manufacturing motorcycles from 1908.

== Premier Cyclecars ==
The Premier cyclecar was launched in 1912. Described at the 1912 Motor Cycle and Cycle Car Show as 'a smart looking two-seater vehicle with coachwork torpedo-type body at 100 guineas'. The engine was a 998 cc air-cooled V-twin (85mm bore, 88mm stroke) with special heavy flywheel for cyclecar work and Bosch magneto. The transmission included a leather cone clutch and two speed gearbox (with reverse), and the rear axle included a differential, there was enclosed chain drive throughout. The chassis was of 'tubular trussed construction' with half elliptic front springing and quarter elliptic rear. The brakes comprised a foot-operated band brake operating on the transmission countershaft, and two internally expanding brakes on the rear axle operated by the hand brake lever.

The Premier Works was situated in Read Street, Coventry. The original factory buildings no longer survive, but the site in more recent times was the location of a factory used by Lucas Aerospace.

== Light car ==
A proper light car designed by the works manager G.W.A. Brown, who had been with Talbot, was added in 1914 with four-cylinder engine of 1592 cc and shaft drive. Testing of the 4-cylinder car continued during the war, but when peacetime production restarted in 1919 it did not appear. Brown had moved to Arrol-Johnston in 1917. Instead the company launched the 8 hp Super Runabout two-seat, three-wheeled cyclecar with 1056 cc, water-cooled, V twin engine, shaft drive to a rear-mounted gearbox and chain drive to the rear wheels.

== 200 mile Brooklands ==
In 1921 Coventry Premier was bought by Singer and the three-wheeler was replaced by a four-wheeled version using the same engine but now having the gearbox combined with the rear axle, eliminating the chain drive. In 1923 the badge appeared on a basic version of the Singer Ten. The name was no longer used on cars from 1924, but bicycle making continued for a few more years.

AJ "Jimmy" Dixon (Alfred James) of Enfield raced a Coventry Premier (No 8) in the 1921 Brooklands Junior Car Club 200 mile race. He finished in fourth place.

About 500 three-wheel and 1200 four-wheeled cars were made.

== See also ==
- Premier Motorcycles
- Singer Motors
- List of car manufacturers of the United Kingdom
