= Premier Motorcycles =

Premier Cycle Co
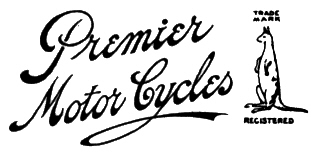
- Industry: Manufacturing and engineering
- Founded: 1908
- Defunct: 1926?
- Fate: 1914 name changed to Coventry Premier
- Successor: 1921 purchased by Singer Motors
- Headquarters: Coventry
- Products: Motorcycles

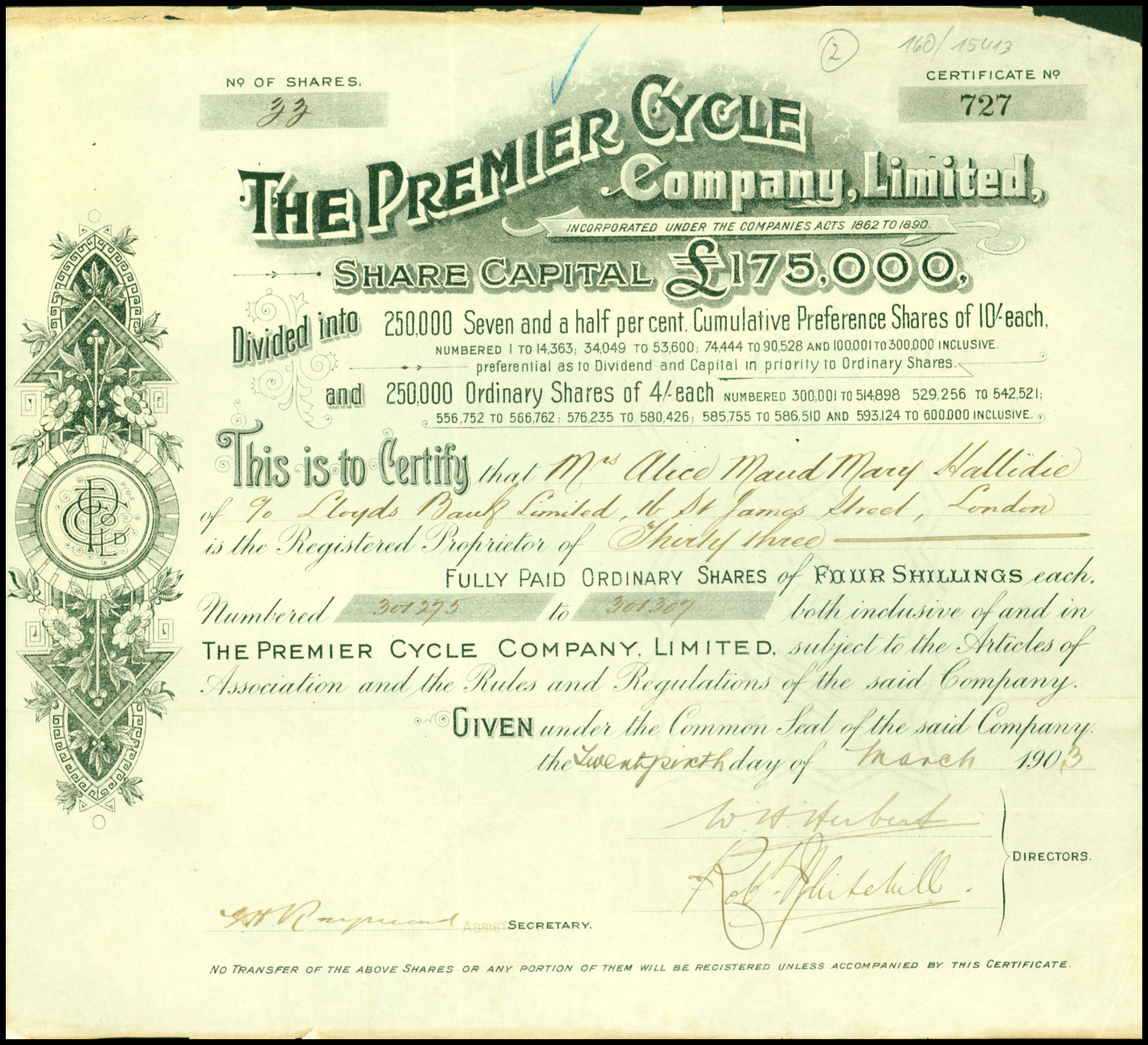
Share of the Premier Cycle Company, issued 26. March 1903

Premier Motorcycles were British motorcycles manufactured by a business founded as a bicycle manufacturer by W. H. Herbert and William Hillman in 1876. Their "Hillman and Herbert Cycle Company" was renamed "Premier Cycle Co." in 1891.

== White & Poppe engine ==
Their first motorcycle was produced in 1908, with a White & Poppe side-valve engine and Chater-Lea front forks. They made their first V-twin in 1909, followed by a 499 cc single-cylinder machine in 1910.

The business changed its name to "The Premier Cycle Company (Coventry Premier Ltd.)" in 1914.

After the First World War bicycle or motorcycle production was not resumed and the cyclecar business was acquired by Singer Motors in 1921 although Premier motorcycles were produced under licence in Czechoslovakia throughout the 1930s.

== Models ==
Model	Year	Notes
Premier	1908	White & Poppe side-valve engine
Premier 500cc	1909	V-twin
998cc	1913	V-twin

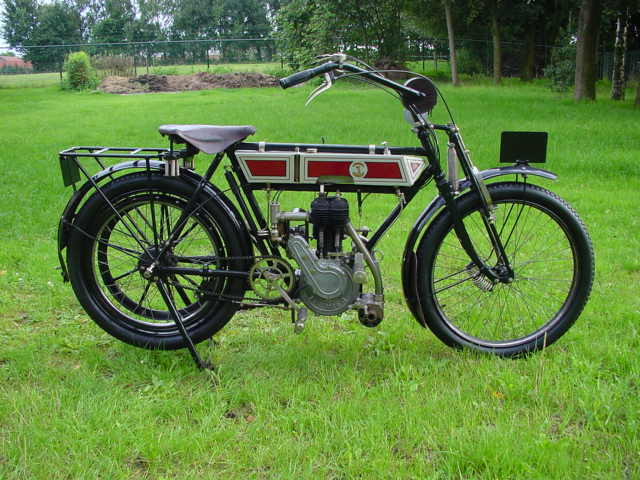
4 hp 500 cc 1911

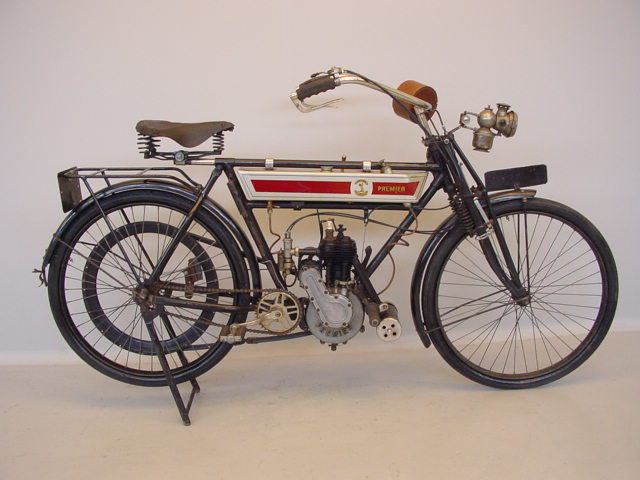
2½ hp 250 cc 1912

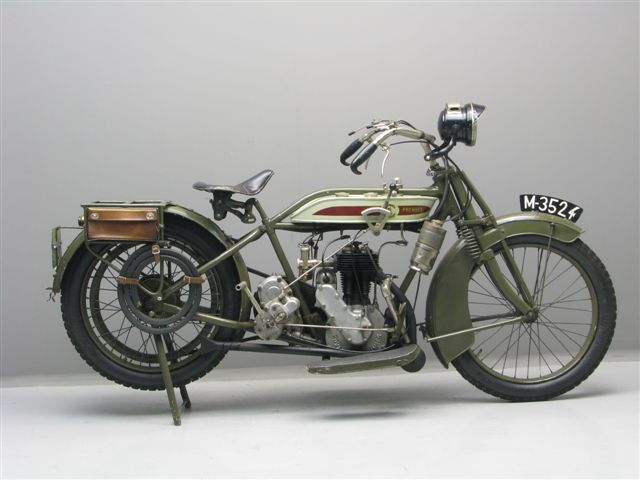
4½ hp 500 cc 1916
