= Singer Ten =

The Singer Ten name was used for several automobiles produced by Singer Motors between 1912 and 1949. The "Ten" in the name referred to the taxation horsepower rating in the United Kingdom.

== Singer Ten (1912-1924) ==
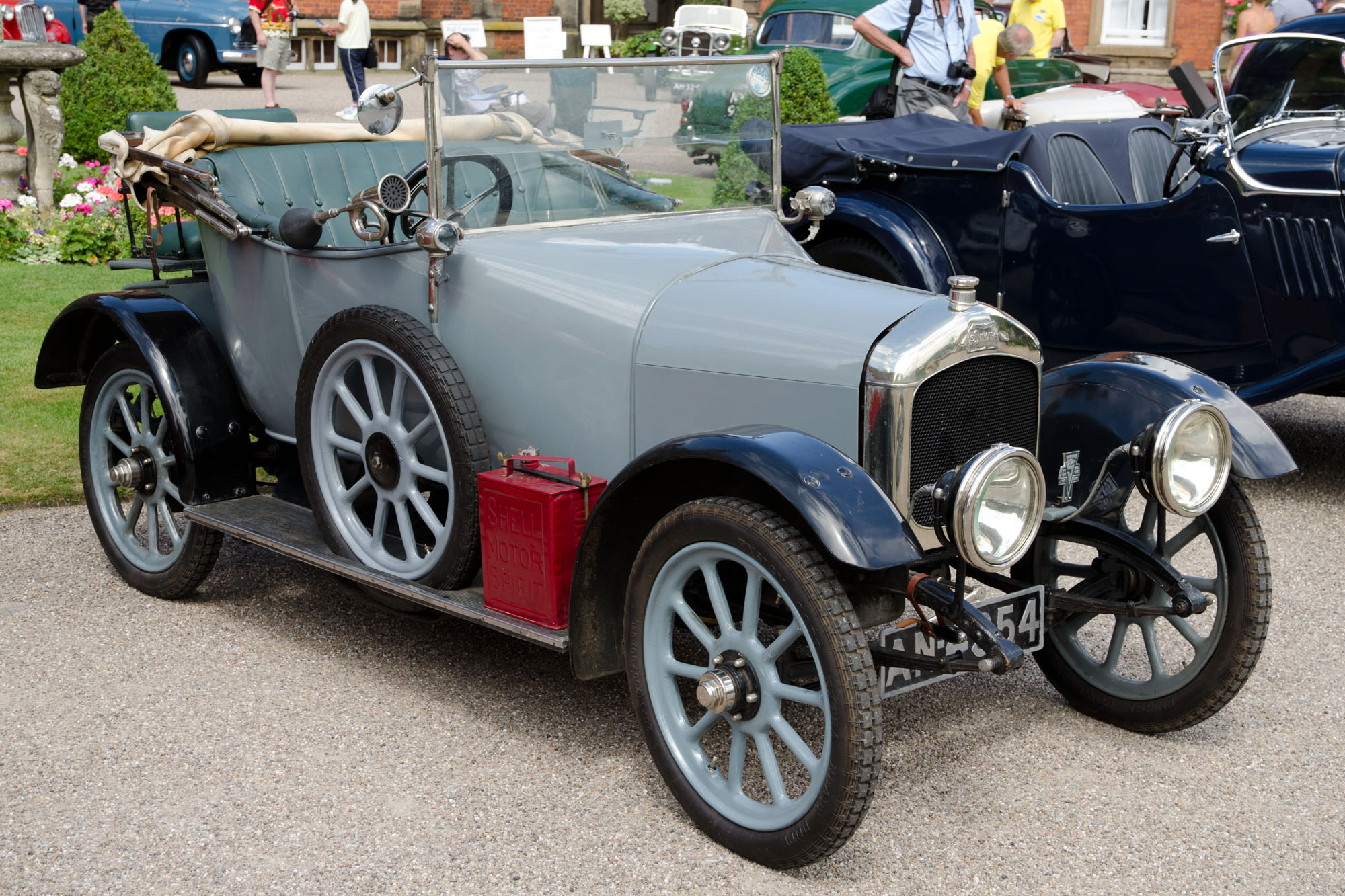
1919 Singer 10

The Ten launched in 1912 was a great success for Singer with possibly as many as 6000 being made. The engine was a four-cylinder unit of 1096 cc initially with side valves but changing to overhead valves in 1923. The three speed transmission was initially located with the rear axle but moved to the centre of the car in 1922 and from 1923 was in-unit with the engine. The chassis had rigid axles front and rear with semi-elliptic leaf springs until 1922 when they changed to quarter elliptic. Braking was on the rear wheels only.

On 11 July 1914, Beatrice Blore drove a Singer Ten car up the cable track of the Great Orme, with a gradient of 1 in 3 in places, becoming the first woman to drive up the steep and challenging headland. She was six months pregnant at the time and the drive was a publicity stunt developed by her partner George Wilkin Browne to help sell the cars at his Llandudno garage, North Wales Silver Motors. The cars were advertised for sale for £195.

A basic version of the car was sold under the Coventry Premier brand in 1923.

== Singer 10/26 (1925-1927) ==
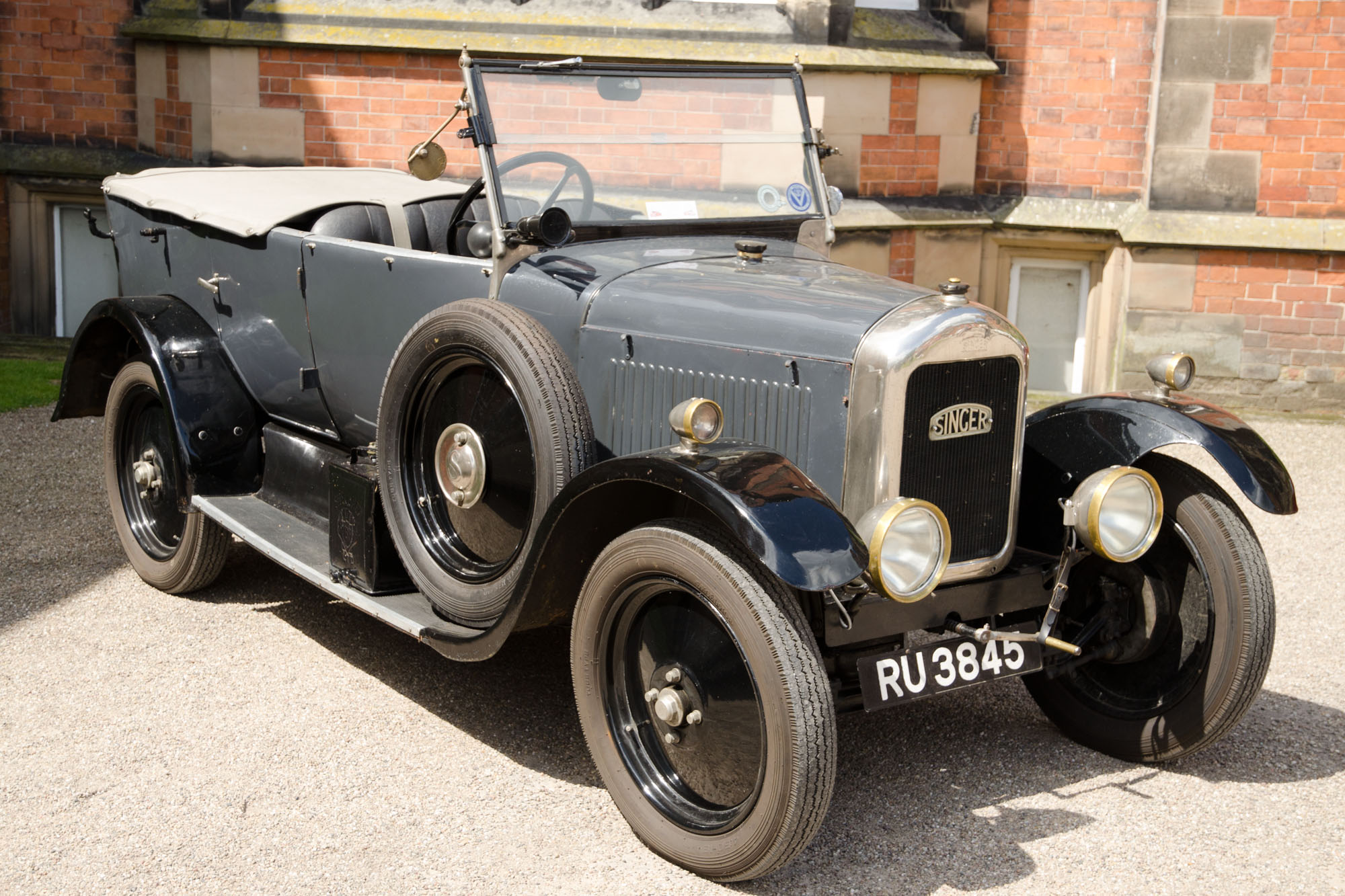
1926 Singer 10/26

The 10/26 was an updated version of the Ten. The engine was enlarged to 1308 cc and rated at 26 bhp. Four wheel brakes were added in 1926. The car could reach 50 mph (80 km/h).

Around 15,500 were made.

== Singer Ten (1931-1932) ==
The Ten name was revived in 1932 for a small car available as a saloon, 4 seat coupé or 4 seat open tourer. The car was powered by a 1261 cc sidevalve engine with coil ignition. The suspension used semi-elliptic springs front and rear and the brakes were mechanically operated. The number made is uncertain.

== Singer Ten and Super Ten (1938-1940) ==
A new Ten was shown at the 1937 London Motor Show with deliveries commencing in 1938. It had an 1185 cc overhead camshaft engine that was essentially an enlarged version of the one used in the Singer Bantam and shared its 95mm stroke. It used a Solex carburettor. Two versions with saloon bodies were available, the basic "Popular" with a three speed gearbox and the Super with four speeds and a remote gearchange. The Popular had leathercloth seat covers but the Super had real leather and also featured a sunroof. Although a version with open coachwork was listed in 1939 it is not known if any were actually made. The Popular was not listed in 1939 and the Super gained a chromium-plated radiator grille. The Solex was replaced by a downdraught SU Carburettor.

The chassis had beam axles front and rear and suspension by half elliptic leaf springs and hydraulic dampers. The brakes used a Lockheed hydraulic system.

== Super Ten (1946-1949) ==
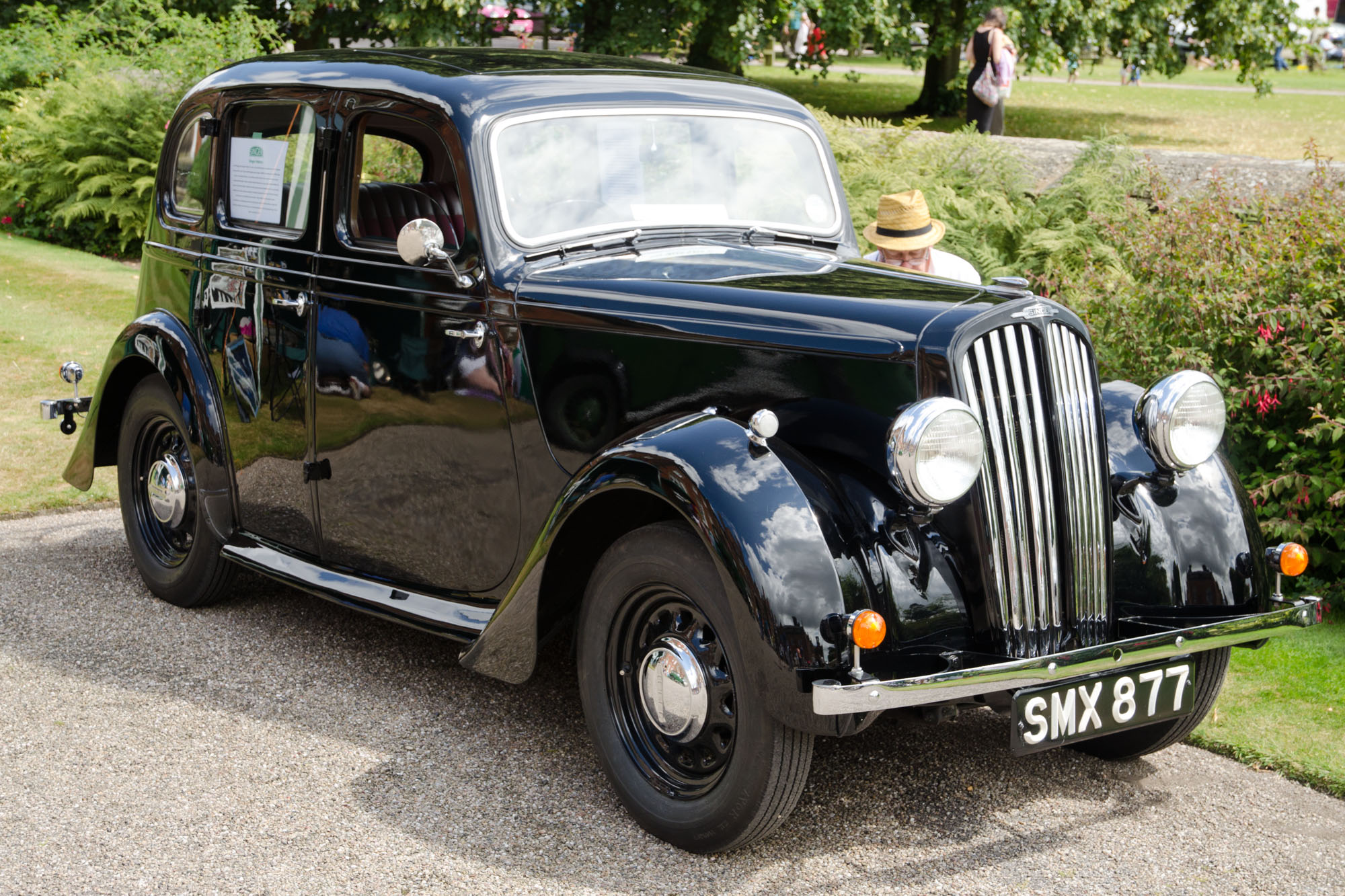
1948 Singer Super Ten

After World War II the car was re-launched in January 1946 with a slightly larger 1194 cc engine developing 37 bhp and a revised gearbox. Only the Super Ten was listed. Exports restarted almost immediately with a shipment to Australia in March 1946.

The Super Ten was produced from 1946 to 1949. Post War it was only offered as a 4-door saloon, although in Australia a locally-built tourer was also available. A top speed of 62 mph (100 km/h) was possible.

10,497 were built.

The car was replaced by the SM1500 model.
