= Singer Nine =

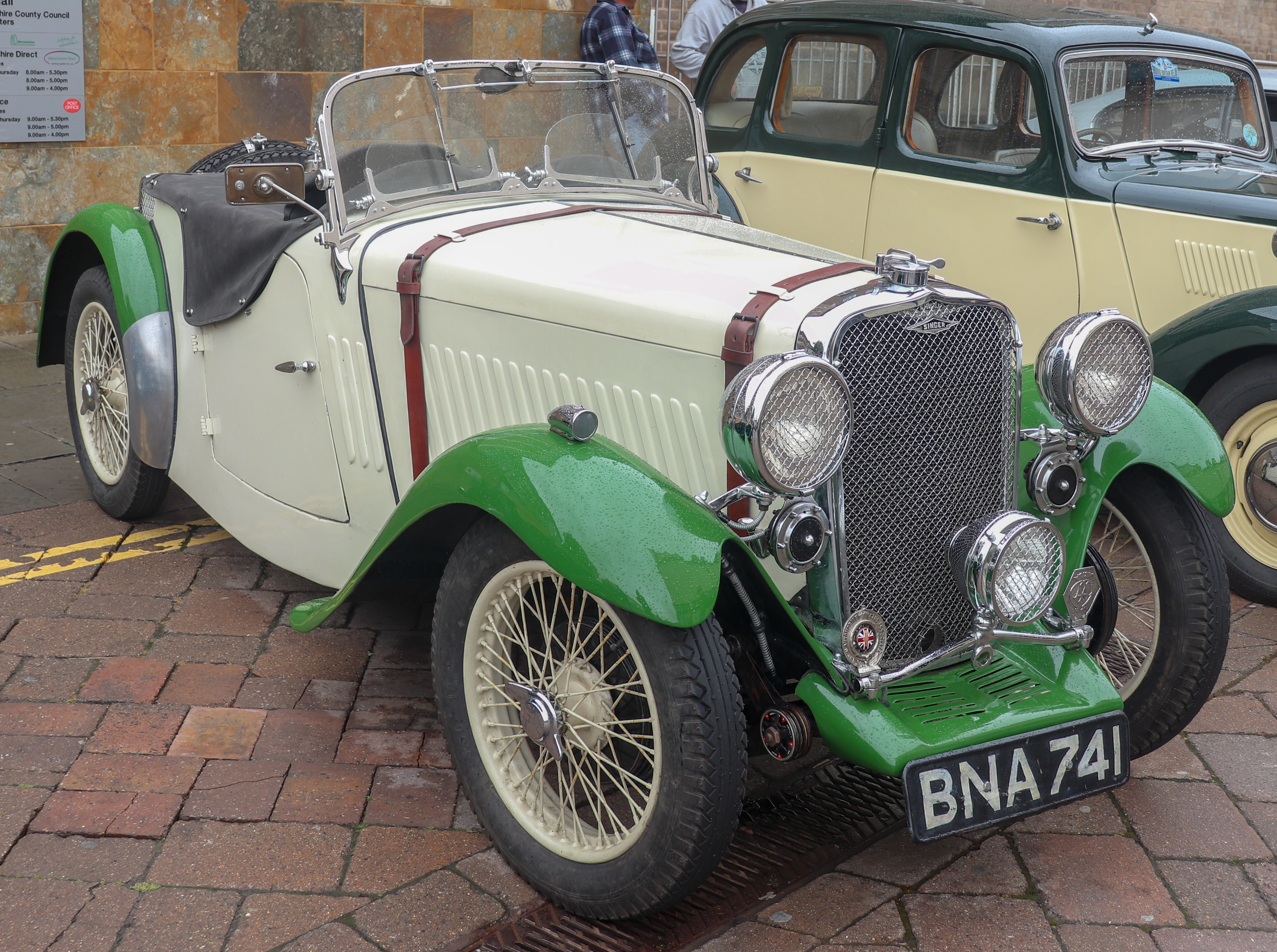
- Late 1933 Singer Nine Sports

Overview
- Manufacturer: Singer & Co Limited then Singer Motors Limited
- Production: 1933–1937
- Assembly: Birmingham and Coventry England

Body and chassis
- Body style: 2/4-door saloon; 2/4-seat sports tourer; 2-seat sports car
- Layout: FR layout

Powertrain
- Engine: 972 cc OHC I4
- Transmission: 4-speed manual

Chronology
- Predecessor: Singer Junior / Junior Nine
- Successor: Bantam Singer Nine

The Singer Nine is a car which was produced by Singer Motors Limited from February 1933 to 1937, and then again from 1939 until 1949 as a Roadster only. It was offered as a new economy model, replacing the earlier Singer Junior series. The "Nine" engine was briefly fitted inside the body of the earlier Junior as a solution to production problems in 1932. The hybrids are known as the "Junior Nine" and are recognisable by the cursive "Nine" badge adorning the radiator stone-guard.

The Singer Nine saloon was replaced by the shorter Bantam Singer Nine in 1936. The sports models were not replaced until 1939 by the Bantam-based tourer, Nine Roadster.

Singer also manufactured six "Nine" 5cwt vans. Only one is known to survive, ironically the survivor had the hardest life overall. It was used by builders Harry Kilminster ltd of Swindon, and was used on some jobs in London during World War 2.

== History ==
The Nine has a 972 cc (59.3 cu in) overhead cam engine, based on earlier design of the 848 cc (51.7 cu in) engine seen in the 8HP Junior. An early version, with notable differences appeared in the aforementioned "Junior Nine", the short-lived interim model shown at the 1931 Olympia Motor Show four months before the Nine's introduction. Power output is 26.5 hp (19.8 kW). Power transmission was through a four-speed manual gearbox.

== Saloon ==
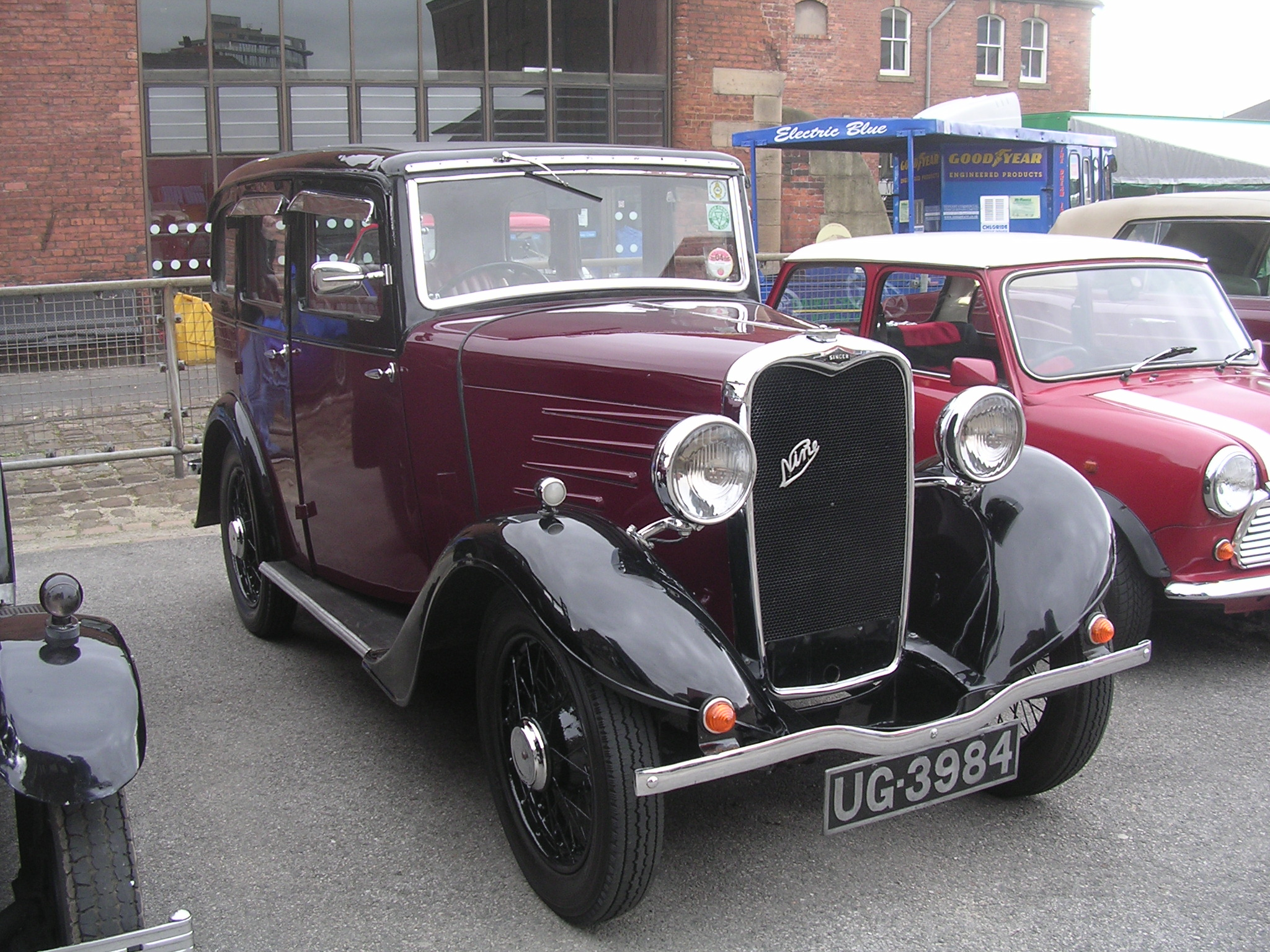
1932 Junior Nine four-door saloon

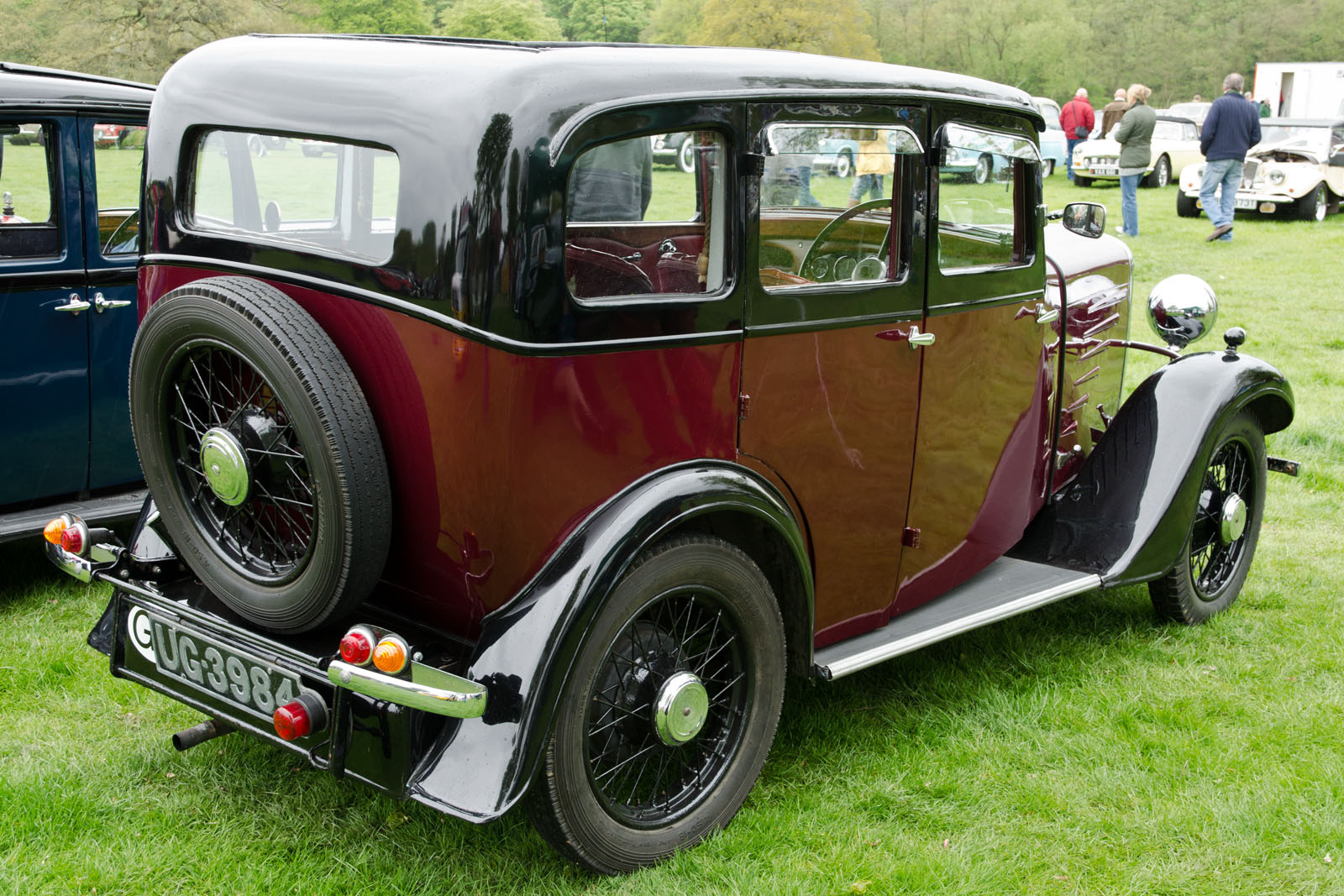

== Nine Sports and variants ==
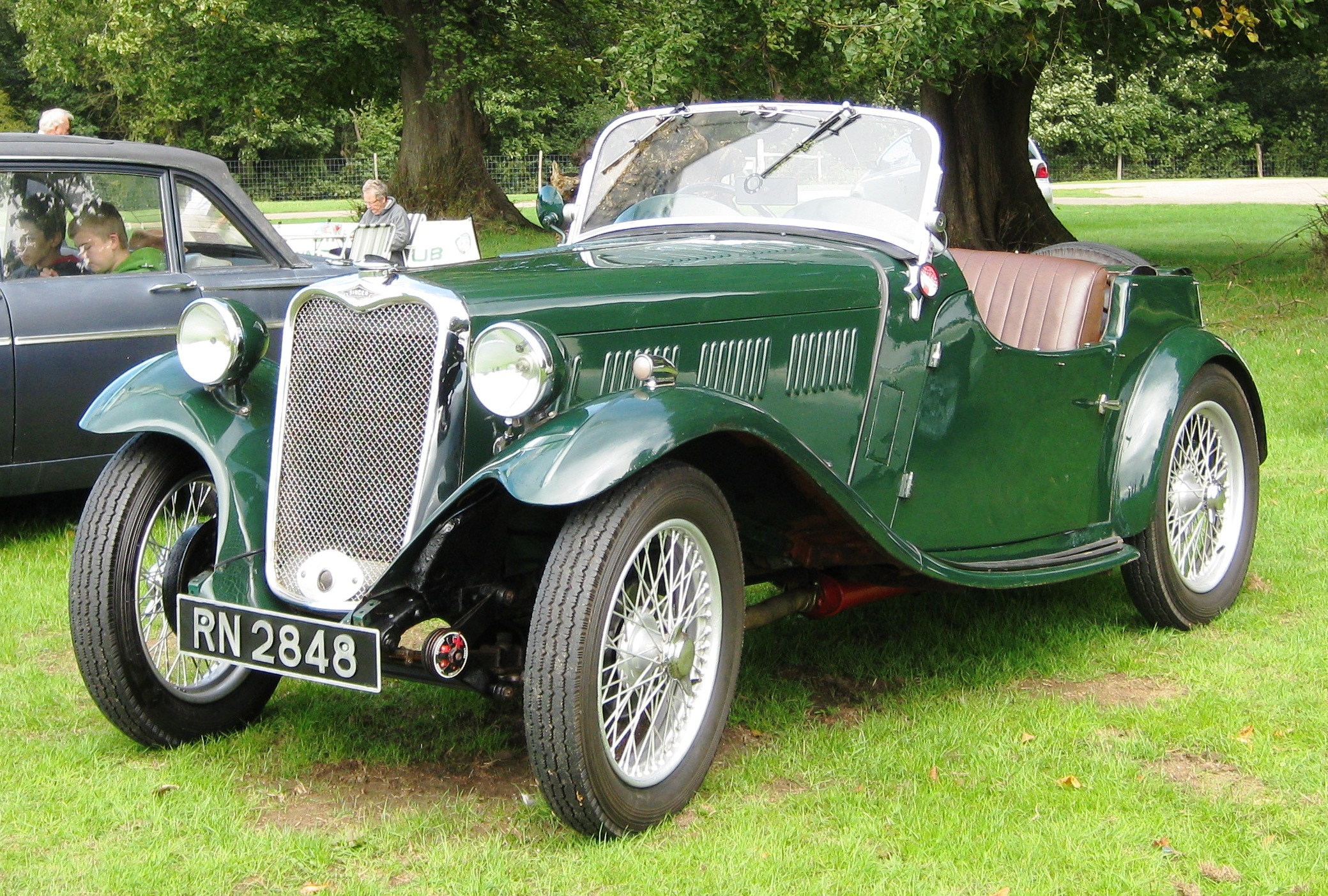
1935 Nine Sports

A four-seat tourer model with abbreviated front wings and no running boards called the "Nine Sports" was also made from October 1933, and one of these managed to finish thirteenth at the 1933 24 Hours of Le Mans race. In 1933, celebrating this moderate success, a new underslung racy two-seat model called the Singer Le Mans appeared. With twin vertical Solex (30 IF) carburettors, the Sports offered 34 hp (25 kW) at 4600 rpm, providing a 66 mph (106 km/h) with the wind screen down - impressive for the era and at a price considerably lower than the competition. The Nine Sports was also used in various other endurance races, finishing second in class in the Alpine 6-days trial (Coupe Internationale des Alpes) in 1933. It is also worth noting that while the engine was listed as 34 bhp at 4600rpm, this is only theoretical, as the two-bearing crankshaft was not capable of reaching this speed. It was inadvisable to approach 3600 rpm, and not to maintain it under any circumstances. The maximum useable and reliably sustainable output from a two-bearing Nine engine is 28 bhp.

For 1934 the front wings were elongated to protect the paintwork on the sides of the car, as the earlier short units were found wanting. For 1935, as the sportier Le Mans gained a four-seater option, running boards appeared on the Nine Sports along with larger doors and a curvier rear end, now nicknamed as the "Long-tail Nine" In 1936, the shorter and simpler Nine-engined Bantam Nine appeared, with an improved three-bearing engine, and in 1937 the Nine was discontinued in favour of this model. However, in 1939 the "Nine" name reappeared on a new Roadster model which depended heavily on the Bantam, meaning that the Nine was to continue in production until into 1949, and as the 4A/4AB until 1953.

=== Le Mans ===
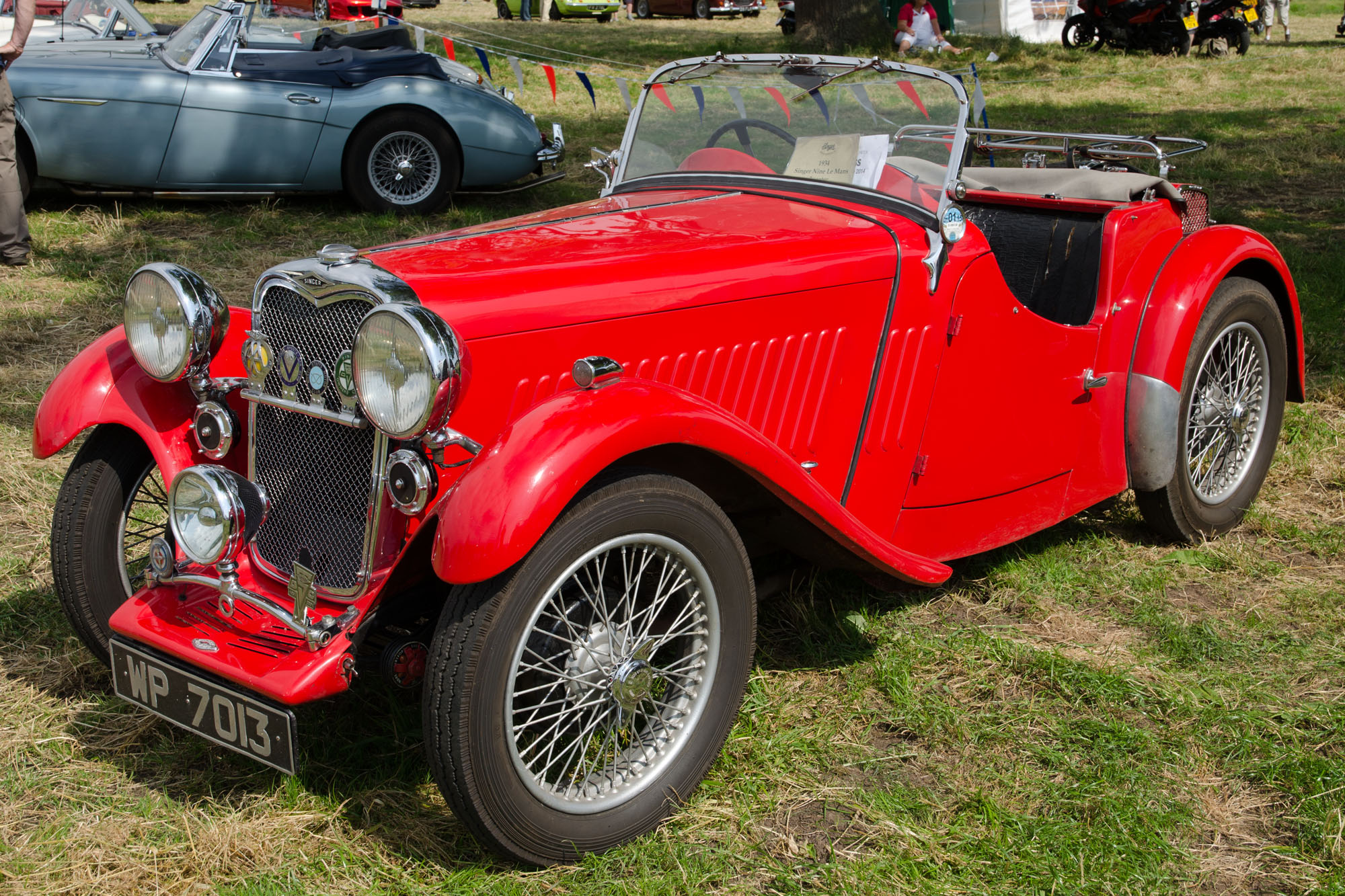
1935 Two-Seater Nine (Incorrect 1933 wings fitted)

Produced from 1933 to 1937, the Nine Le Mans had a higher tuned version of the 972 cc inline-four, with stronger valve tappets, a thicker, sharply angled camshaft paired with flat-back rocker arms, and a bigger and better cooled cast aluminium oil sump of roughly 2 Gallons in capacity. Power climbed to a sustainable 34 hp (25 kW) and a close-ratio gearbox was fitted. The chassis was dropped in the centre after the radiator, and thus underslung at the rear, giving the car a much lower profile relative to the road, as compared to the Sports variant. No running boards, a 12-imperial-gallon (55 L) external fuel tank and twin spare wheels finished the competition appearance, and added valuable weight to the rear axle. As opposed to the competing MGs, the Singer had more powerful and dependable hydraulic Lockheed brakes. The Nine Le Mans, while not particularly successful at the track which gave it its name, clocked up an impressive number of wins at hillclimbs, trials, and various endurance races such as the Liège-Rome-Liège and the Alpine Cup Rally. In 1935 a four-seater version of the Le Mans was also available, somewhat of a hybrid of the Sports and the regular Le Mans.

=== Special Speed ===
Also for 1935, the more spacious and powerful Special Speed version appeared. This had running boards, a bigger 13.5-imperial-gallon (61 L) fuel tank, and a bigger passenger compartment achieved by moving the spare wheels backwards. The Special Speed also received a tuned 38.5 hp (28.7 kW) engine with twin vertical Solex (30 IF) carburettors, a speed cylinder head with angled spark plugs, a heavier cast iron flywheel and a counterbalanced web crankshaft. For 1936 and 1937, the Special Speed replaced the Le Mans model.

=== Le Mans Replica ===
In 1935, Singer added a Le Mans Replica to their catalogue. At more than twice the price of a regular Le Mans, this was intended for an uncompromising owner. In the end, however, only four of these highly tuned lightweight specials were built, and all remained with Singer until after the 1939 racing season. One of these finished as the first one-litre car at the 1935 Le Mans (second in the 1.1 class). The Replica also saw action at Brooklands and at the Donington and Ulster Tourist Trophies. The replica has a 10:1 compression ratio and various other engine modifications. A steel channel-section streamlined body replaced the ash construction, and Electrum was used instead of cast Aluminium, which, when coupled with the engine tuning meant a top speed of over 98 mph (158 km/h). The 1,288 lb (584 kg) weight was 425 lb (193 kg) less than that of a regular Le Mans two-seater. The correct designation is Works Team Car and they were intended for the TT race. Three of the four cars made, ran in the 1935 Le Mans race. In order to be used in the TT race they had to be production models and were advertised as "replicas" of the cars that ran at Le Mans. No more than four replica cars were built, and miraculously, all four of the cars have survived, and three of which still run to this day.

And whilst advertised as "replicas" of the cars that ran at Le Mans, they share very little mechanically, having a different chassis, front axle, body mounting, and an altered ratio for the differential. The "replica" cars are far more powerful and faster than those they were supposedly designed after.

=== Carburettors ===
The vast majority Singer Nines were fitted with Solex 30 IF "down-draught" carburettors. Some were made with 30 FHG horizontal carburettors, but few are known to still exist.. After the Second World War, Solex offered car owners a free upgrade. They sent in their original carburettor, 30 IF or FHG, and in return they would get a modern, cast aluminium 30 FAI (vertical) or 30 AHG (horizontal) to fit to their car. The original carburettors were then melted down and re-cast into their modern equivalents.

A few different carburettors were fitted to various Singer engines in the 30's. The Junior, Nine, 14hp, 1.5 Litre, and 2 Litre engines were mostly fitted with single or twin Solex, depending on the model, with Saloon models bearing single carburettors, however the experimental 1.5 Litre Crossflow engine was fitted with triple SU's. Only 72 of these cars were made, and the first 12 produced were fitted with the original 1.5 Litre non-crossflow engine. Leaving 60 to be found, of which 8 have been confirmed to exist. Some later Juniors ('30 & '31) were fitted with single SU carburettors as well, however the "Junior Nine" of 1932, made as a stop-gap solution prior to the Nine's production, returned to Solex carburettors.

=== Roadster ===
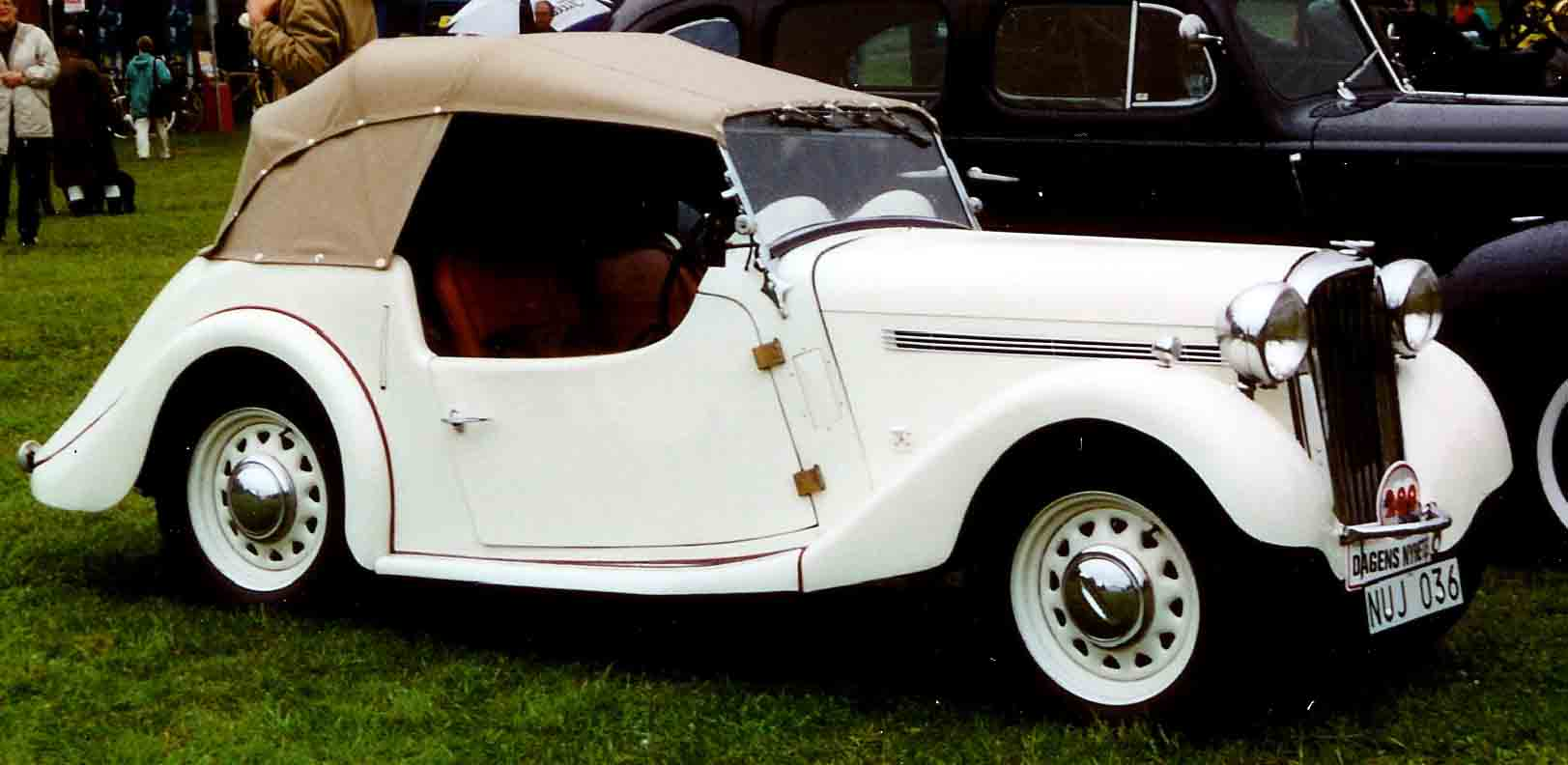
2 / 4 seater 9hp Roadster 1939

The Roadster was a variant of the Bantam Singer Nine. After some years Singer cautiously returned to the sports tourer but not sports car market. The open four-seater Nine Roadster appeared 6 March 1939 with a lightly tuned version of the larger 1074 cc overhead camshaft engine already seen in the Bantam Nine, as well as that car's three-speed gearbox.

Singer Commercials

Singer made a range of commercial vehicles of which only a few examples remain today.

Singer Nine van

The Singer Nine van range was not very popular with only six of them ever produced, of which only one, a 1934 model, is known to survive to this day and is still used as a works vehicle for a small company in Woodhall Spa, Lincolnshire. Recently the details of another Singer Nine van have been found; this van was scrapped in 1953 after suffering a damaged engine. The whereabouts of the other four vans produced have never been found and presumed scrapped at the end of their working lives.

Singer Ten Van

The Singer Ten van was a reasonably well produced model of which only one survives in the Coventry Transport Museum. Its size meant that the model was useful for many of the team events with the Singer racing team. Considering it was a more successful model than the Nine van it is intriguing how only one of these models still survives.
