= Singer Bantam =

Bantam Singer Nine
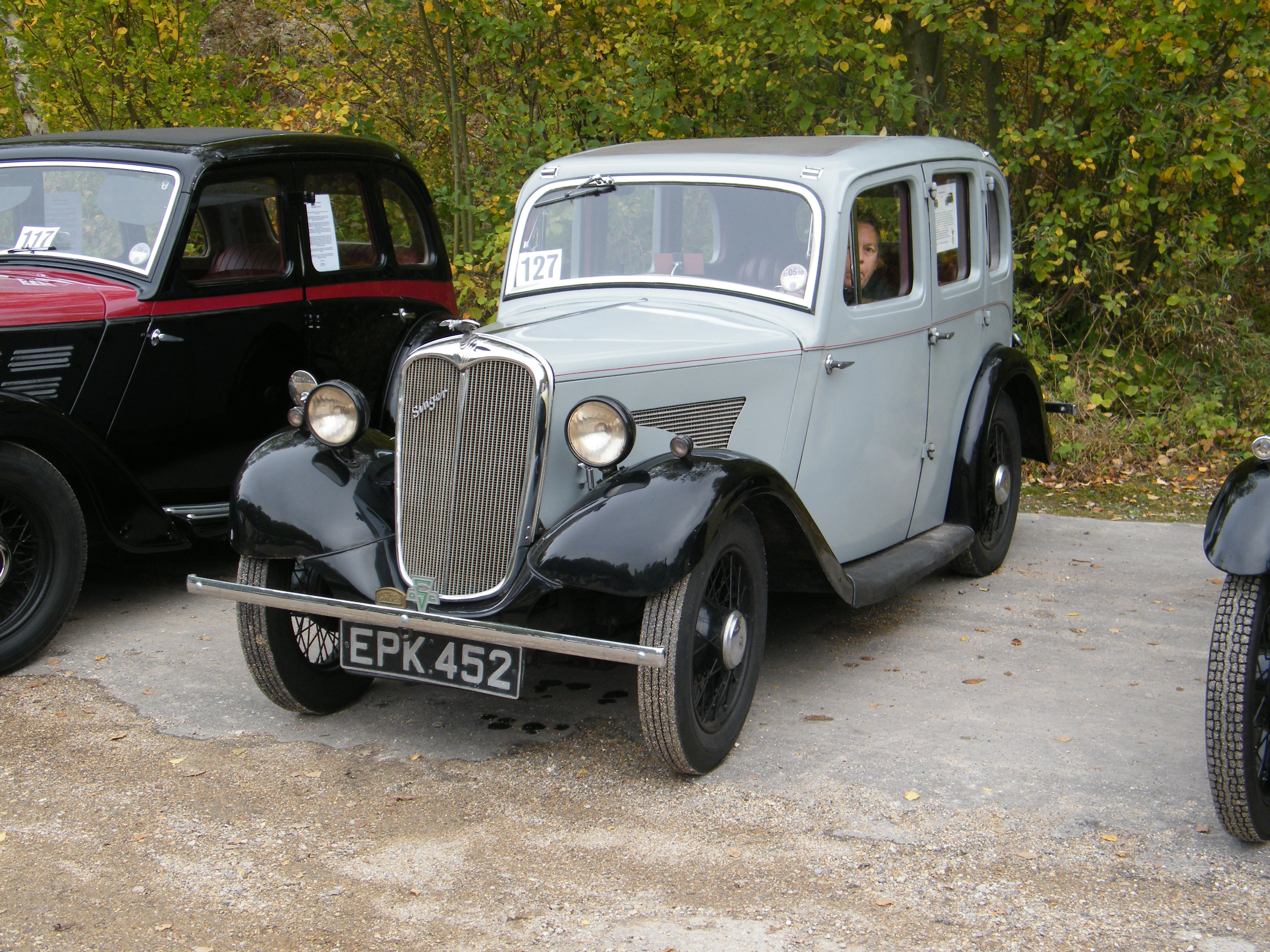
- Bantam 4-door saloon de luxe 972cc 1936 example

Overview
- Manufacturer: Singer Motors Limited
- Production: 1936–1939
- Assembly: Coventry, England

Body and chassis
- Body style: 2-door saloon 4-door saloon 2-door van 2 and 4 seat tourer
- Layout: FR layout

Powertrain
- Engine: 972 cc OHC I4; 1074 cc OHC I4
- Transmission: single-plate dry clutch, 3-speed manual, synchromesh on top and second gears with central control, needle roller bearings hold the driveshaft which leads to a half floating spiral bevel-driven axle which has spur gear differential

Dimensions
- Wheelbase: 91 inches (2311 mm)
- Length: 142 in (3,607 mm) "Bantam" saloon
- Width: 56 in (1,422 mm)
- Height: 63 in (1,600 mm)
- Kerb weight: 15cwt 1,680 lb (760 kg)

Chronology
- Predecessor: Singer Nine
- Successor: none. Singer SM1500; Singer 9 Roadster

Bantam Singer Nine

Overview
- Manufacturer: Singer Motors Limited

Layout
- Configuration: inline four
- Displacement: 972 cc; 1074 cc
- Cylinder bore: 60
- Piston stroke: 86; 95
- Cylinder block material: iron, 2 main bearings
- Cylinder head material: detachable
- Valvetrain: overhead camshaft and valves

Combustion
- Fuel system: horizontal carburettor, electric fuel pump on dashboard
- Oil system: forced
- Cooling system: natural circulation

Output
- Power output: 25.75 @ 4,200 rpm; 30 @ 4,200 rpm; Tax 8.93HP

Chronology
- Predecessor: Singer Nine
- Successor: none

The Singer Bantam is a car which was produced by Singer from 1936 to 1939. It was the first model from Singer to have an all-steel body, by Pressed Steel Company. It was offered as a new economy model at the 1935 Motor Show in London, replacing the earlier Singer Nine series.

== History ==
Derived from the Singer Nine, with styling a close copy of the Ford Model Y, it debuted with two models and two trim levels: 2- and 4-door, either Popular or De-Luxe. All four shared the same basic bodyshell but, whereas the De-Luxe models had a sliding sunroof, the Popular version had a fixed panel in the roof. Other features of the De-Luxe model were leather seats, chrome bumpers, and a rear luggage rack.

The Bantam re-used many existing components from the Singer parts bin. It used the Le Mans' underslung chassis and 972 cc overhead cam engine, although with a lower compression ratio and single Solex carburettor. Power transmission was through a three-speed manual gearbox with synchromesh on third gear. Early models were equipped with wire wheels, while the optional easyclene wheels became standard from 1937. A chromed mascot portraying a flying Bantam chicken was mounted on the radiator surround until this was outlawed by new legislation in 1937.

For 1937 a Tourer model was announced, although few were made and very few survive. The Saloon got an upgrade in 1937 for the 1938 model year. The chassis and suspension were strengthened to take the larger 1074 cc inline-four engine with a stated 30 hp of output, and the brakes were converted to a cable system. The bodyshell remained the same apart from an extra chrome trim strip across the doors and changes to the bonnet louvres.

Many Bantams survive in Australia and New Zealand. Singer exported these vehicles as rolling chassis with complete powertrain. They were mainly bodied by the Flood company in Australia as tourers and roadsters, and this seems to have prompted the development of the roadster model by Singer in 1939, based on the Bantam chassis and engine.

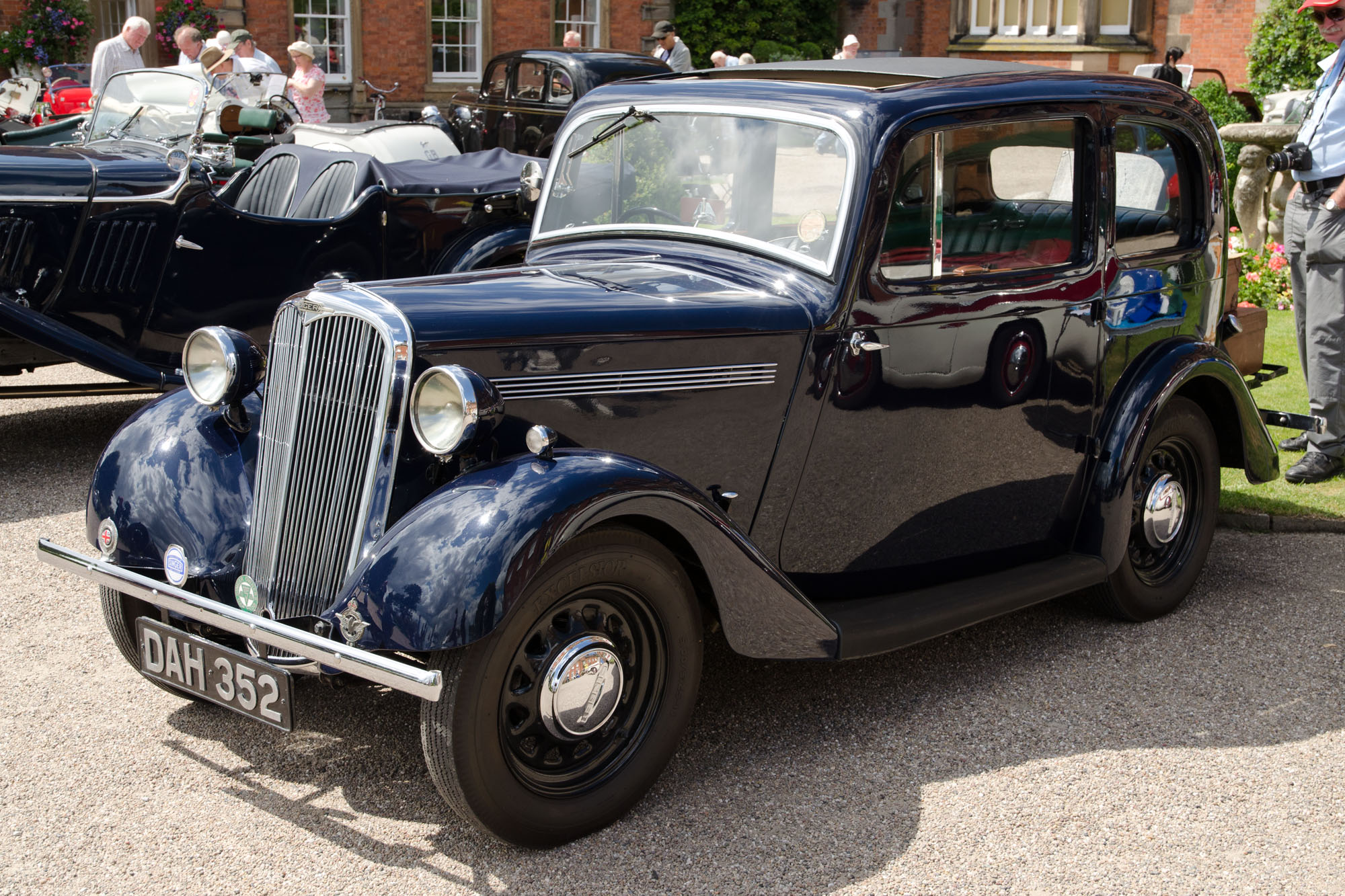
1939 2-door saloon

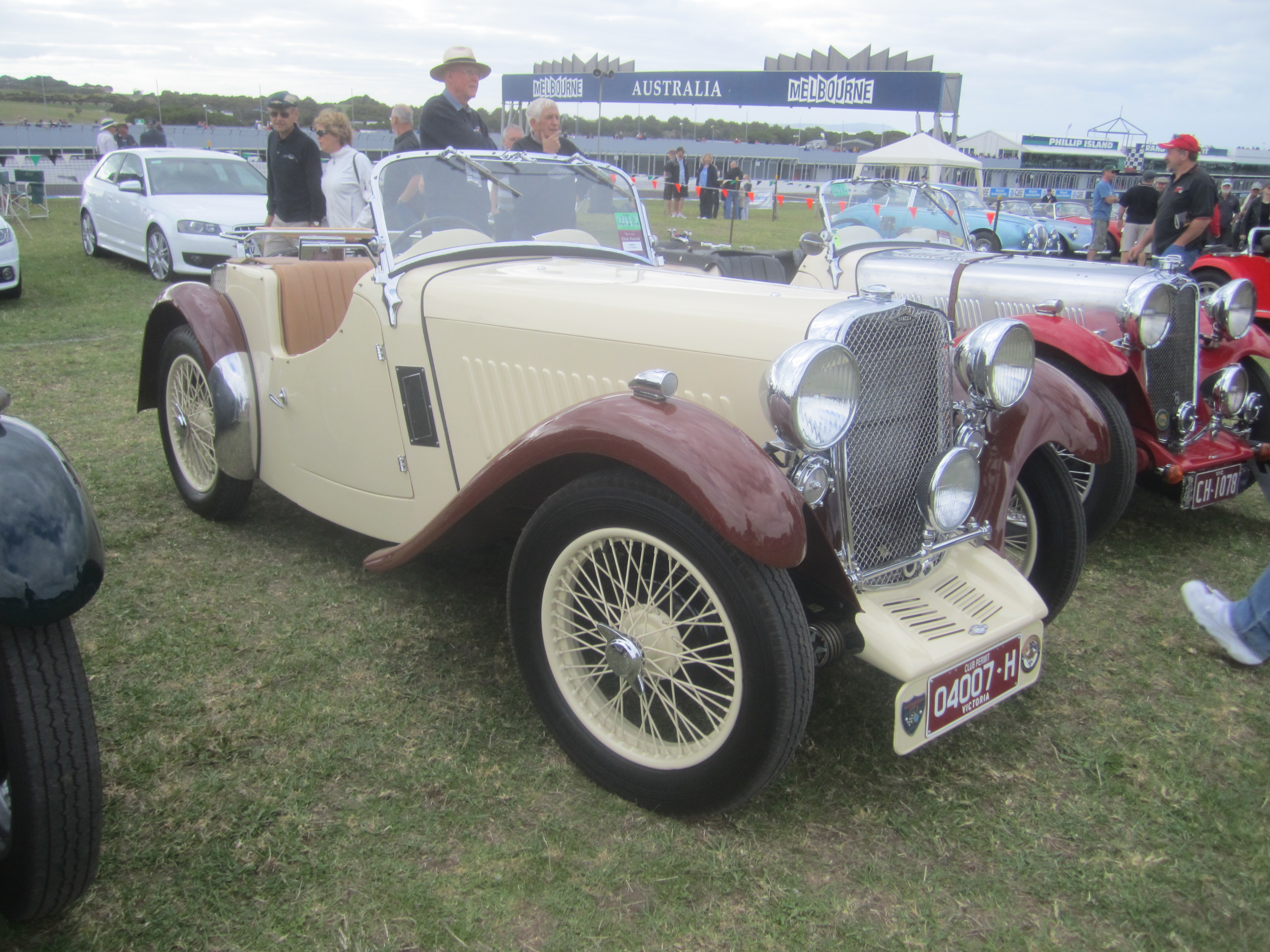
Tourer

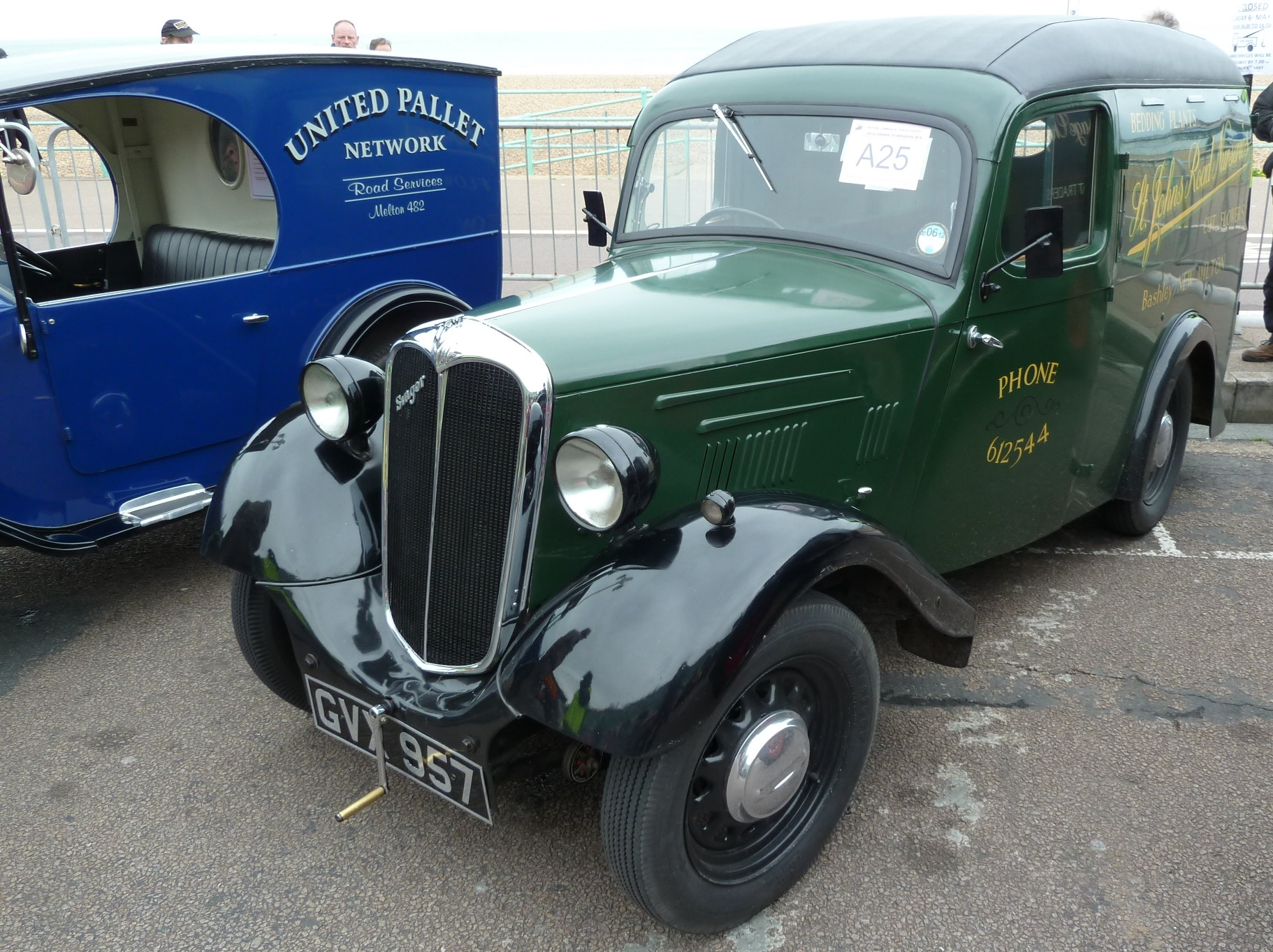
1939 van

== Brakes, suspension and steering ==
The four-wheel brakes are operated hydraulically. They are designed on the Lockheed system. There is also a hand lever fitted with a sensibly shaped trigger to control the back brakes. The springs front and back are half-elliptical with oilite bearings and double-action hydraulic shock absorbers. The rear suspension like the frame passes below the axle. Steering is by worm and nut in a box held by a bracket to the frame.

== Road test ==
The Times' correspondent reported that the engine pulls strongly and quickly lifts vehicle speed. Though not as quiet as a side-valve it sounds and feels efficient. The change speed lever was a little stiff and vague in action. A slight pause is necessary when changing gear to allow the synchromesh to do its job. The brakes proved effective though they pulled towards the nearside. The driver's position is excellent. "The accelerator might be cranked a little more to the right for the benefit of a large and heavy-footed driver". A comfortable top speed (in poor gusty weather) was 60 mph (97 km/h).

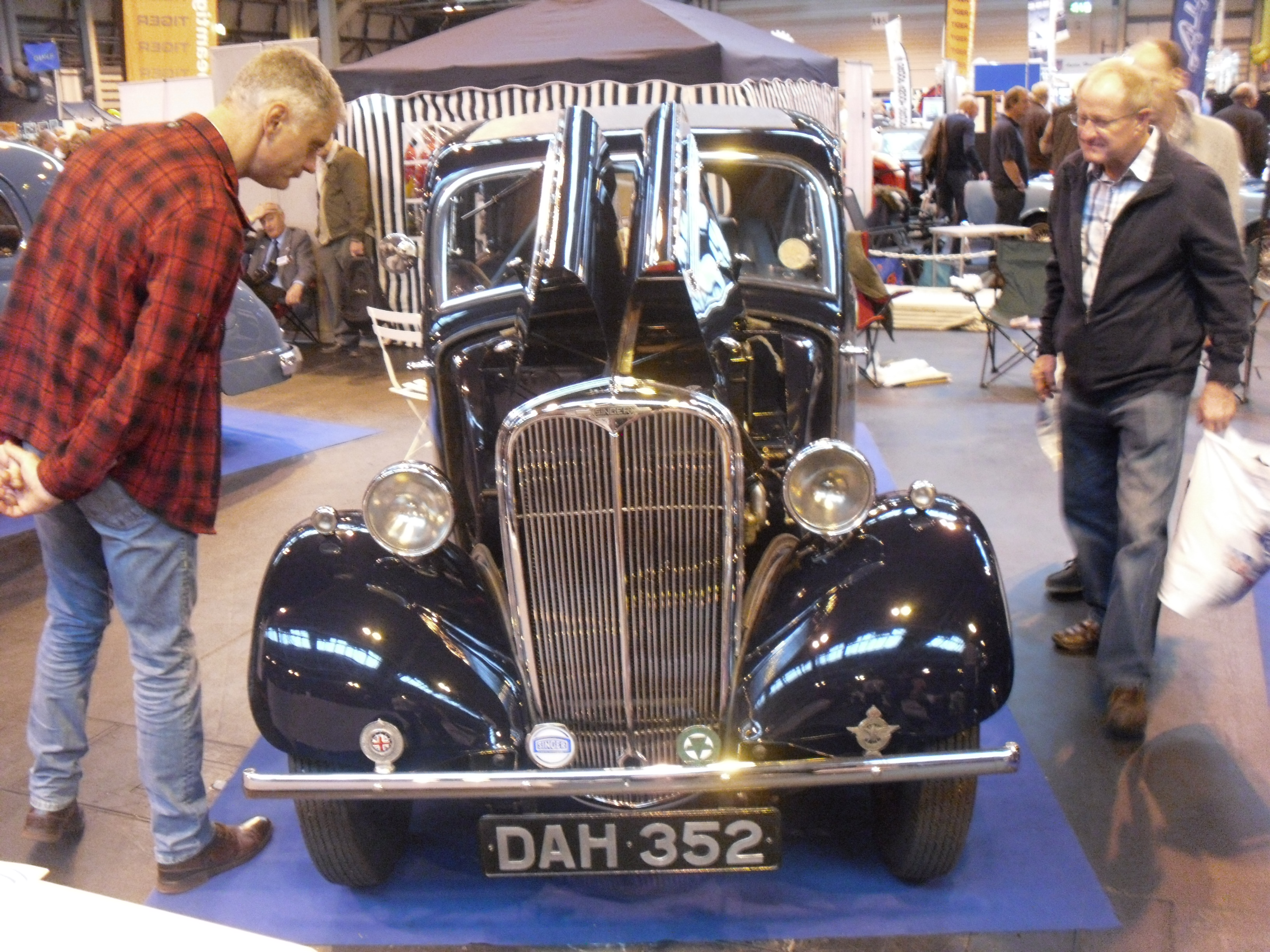
1939 Singer Bantam

== Motor sport ==
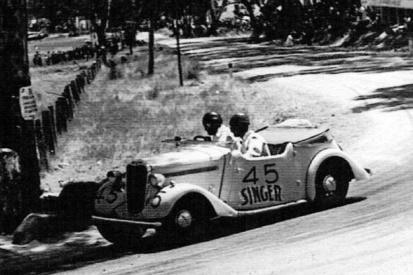
Tom Brady won the 1939 Australian Stock Car Road Championship driving a Singer Bantam

Tom Brady won the 1939 Australian Stock Car Road Championship driving a Singer Bantam.

== Roadster ==
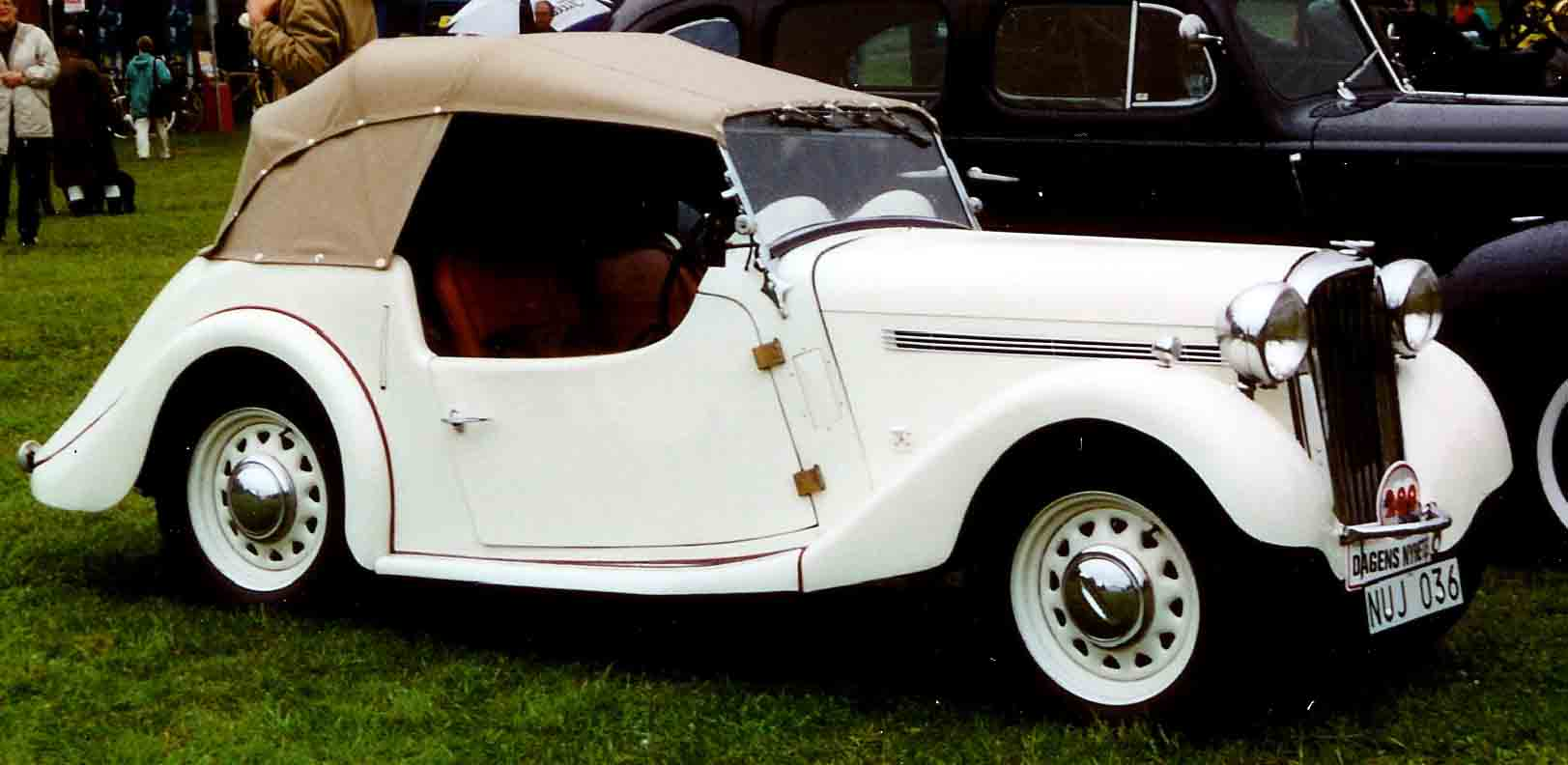
2 / 4 seater 9hp Roadster 1939

In 1939 Singer decided that they needed a more comfortable, but still sporting model in their lineup. Thus, the open four-seater Nine Roadster appeared 6 March 1939 with a lightly tuned version of the larger 1074 cc overhead camshaft engine already seen in the Bantam Nine, as well as that car's three-speed gearbox. In September 1949 the name was changed to Singer 9 Roadster series 4A to herald the introduction of a four-speed transmission, but the model continued to be built in 1.1 litre form until 1953 and in 1½-litre form as Singer SM Roadster until 1955.
