= Singer Roadster =

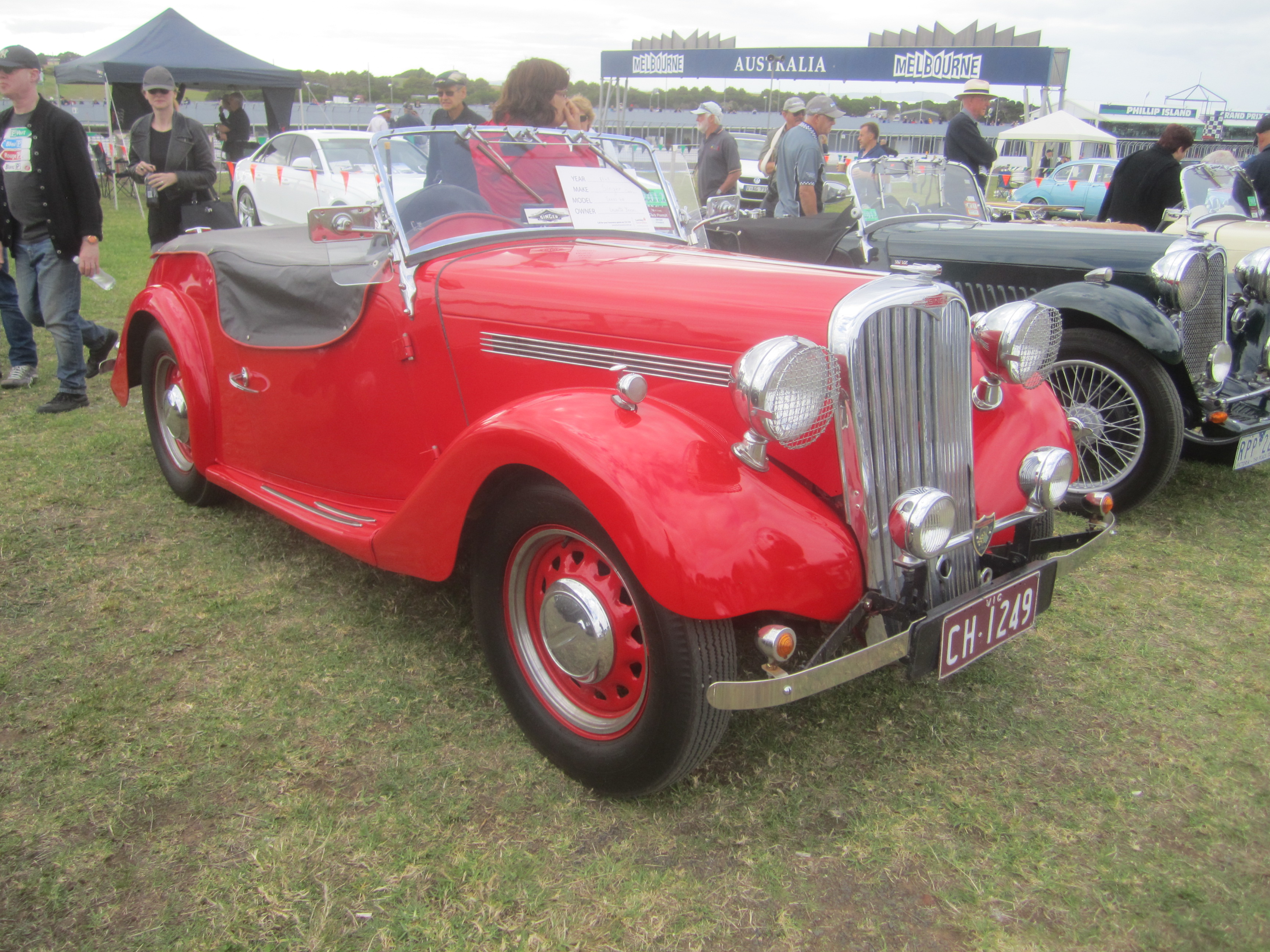
- 1947 Singer 9 Roadster

Overview
- Manufacturer: Singer Motors Limited
- Production: 1939–1955; 12,700 approx produced out of which 63 coach built by James Young
- Assembly: Coventry, England

Body and chassis
- Body style: 2-door convertible
- Layout: FR layout

Dimensions
- Wheelbase: 91 in (2,311 mm)
- Length: 151 in (3,835 mm)
- Width: 58 in (1,473 mm)
- Height: 58 in (1,473 mm)

Chronology
- Predecessor: Singer Bantam tourer
- Successor: none

The Singer Roadster is a nine tax horsepower open 2/4-seater sports-tourer automobile manufactured by Singer from 1939 until 1955. It was launched in March 1939 as an open version of Singer's Bantam saloon and using many Bantam parts.

After less than six months production was suspended for the duration of World War II then restarted with the engine moved forward, more interior space and other minor modifications. The Roadster was upgraded to the 4A model in 1949 with a 4-speed manual gearbox. The short lived 4AB and 4AC models were released in 1950 followed by the 4AD SM Roadster in 1951. Singer Roadsters competed with the MG T series. The flowing lines of the car made it one of the most attractive roadsters in the market. The last cars were made in 1955. A few special Singer 4A car bodies were made by coach maker James Young.

== Singer 9 Roadster 1939-1949 ==
9 Roadster
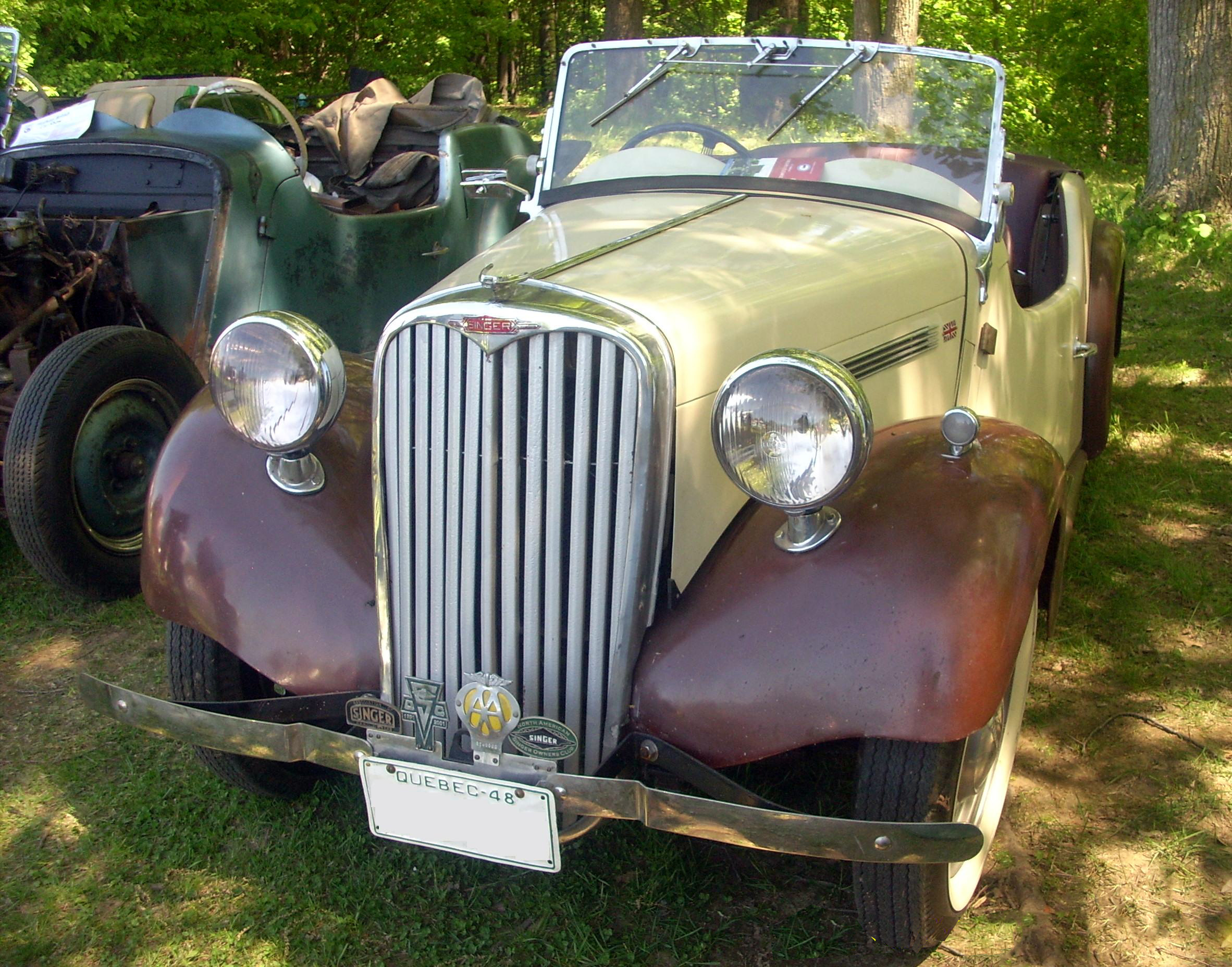
- 1948 Singer 9 Roadster

Overview
- Production: 1939-1949

Powertrain
- Engine: 1074 cc I4
- Transmission: 3-speed manual

Chronology
- Predecessor: Singer Bantam tourer
- Successor: Singer 9 Roadster series 4A see below

Engine Roadster tune Bantam Singer Nine

Overview
- Manufacturer: Singer Motors Limited

Layout
- Configuration: inline four
- Displacement: 1074 cc
- Cylinder bore: 60
- Piston stroke: 95
- Cylinder block material: iron, 2 main bearings
- Cylinder head material: detachable compression ratio 6.9:1
- Valvetrain: overhead camshaft and valves

Combustion
- Fuel system: downdraught S.U. carburettor, electric fuel pump on dashboard
- Oil system: forced
- Cooling system: natural circulation

Output
- Power output: 36 @ 5,000 rpm Tax 8.93HP

Chronology
- Predecessor: Singer Nine
- Successor: none

The original Roadster was an occasional four-seat, two-door tourer, mostly based on the Bantam saloon with a cheery character. It had Singer's overhead camshaft, 1074 cc inline-four engine used in the Bantam range but tuned slightly to give 36 hp (27 kW) at 5000 rpm by fitting a high efficiency "hot-spot" manifold and downdraught SU carburettor, as well as having slightly higher compression. For 1940 sliding glass panels replaced the celluloid in the sidescreens along with other equipment improvements. A chromed front bumper was now standard as were twin aero screens for use when the windscreen was folded flat to reduce frontal area. A fitted suitcase was supplied to take full advantage of the usable space in the luggage compartment. Performance was handicapped by the use of the Bantam's three speed gearbox and top speed was in the order of 65 mph (105 km/h).

Advertising copy incorporated "from the inspiration of the Le Mans model" though the Singer sports-racing link remained deliberately muted after the death of 8 spectators in September 1936's RAC Tourist Trophy on Ireland's Ards Circuit, the Ulster TT. In that era the TT was a handicap and won by either MG or Riley. Unlike the Le Mans the Roadster was designed and built so it could be sold at a moderate price.

The makers claimed a top speed of 70 mph (110 km/h) and acceleration: 0 to 30 mph (48 km/h) in 6 seconds and 0 to 50 mph (80 km/h) in 18 seconds. Standard equipment included a spring steering wheel, concealed spare wheel, 12-volt electrical system and windscreen wipers.

The body was built in the traditional method of aluminium panels fixed to a wooden framework. The suspension used leaf springs and was non independent with rigid axles front and rear. The brakes were mechanically operated.

The successful Roadster re-appeared following the war, in 1946, with these modifications: non-lubricated rubber shackle bushes, improved seating accommodation provided by moving the engine forward and an improved lid at the rear of the body providing a flat platform for luggage. These changes seem to have improved the handling. Better engine mounts and other isolations were introduced, providing a smoother ride and lessening maintenance. Cars began to filter out to the dealers in September 1946. Nearly all post war production was exported the car being popular with the Elite in India and featured in the collections of a few Maharaja's.

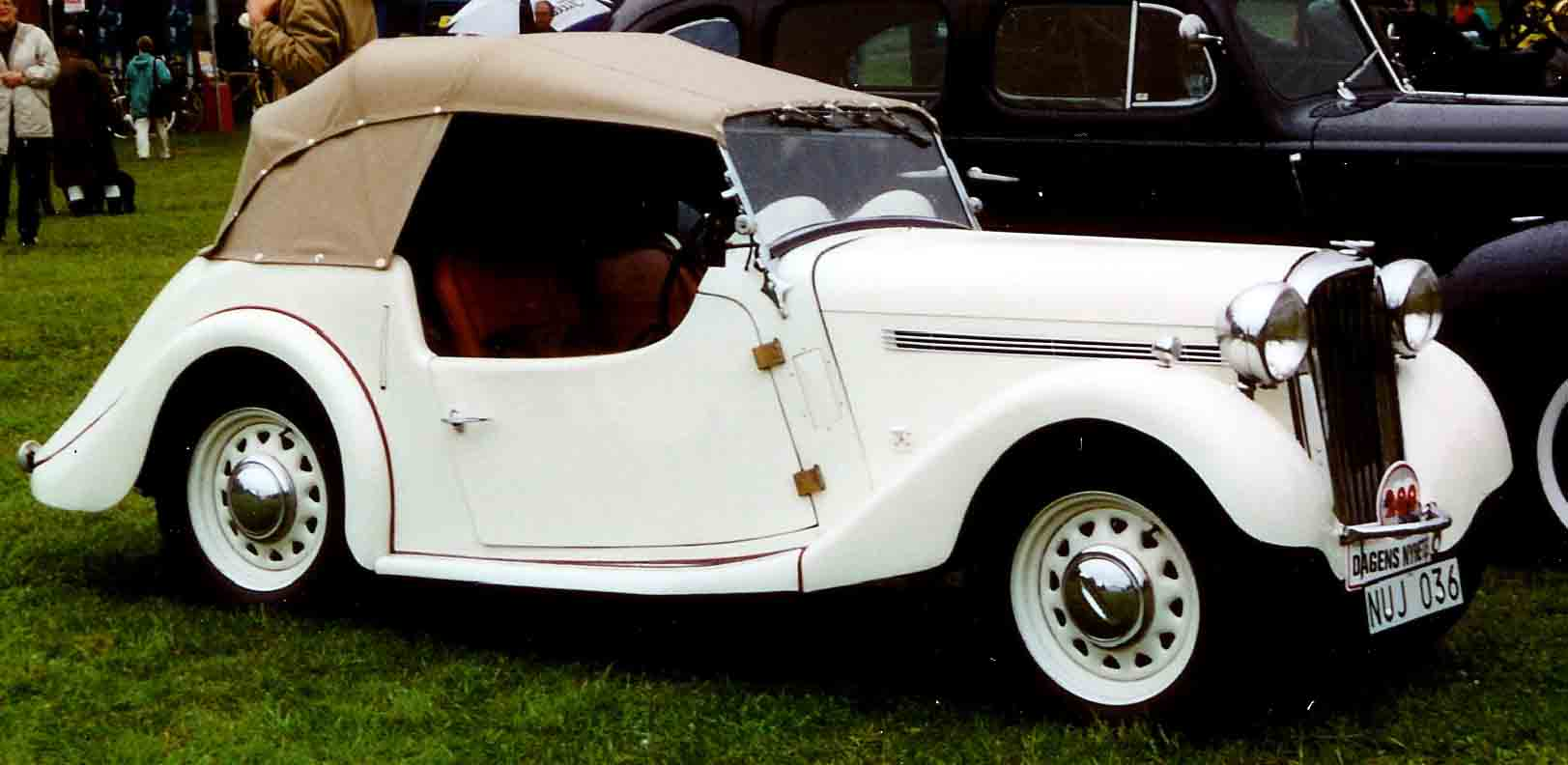
Prewar For 1946 the engine was moved forward leaving more passenger space

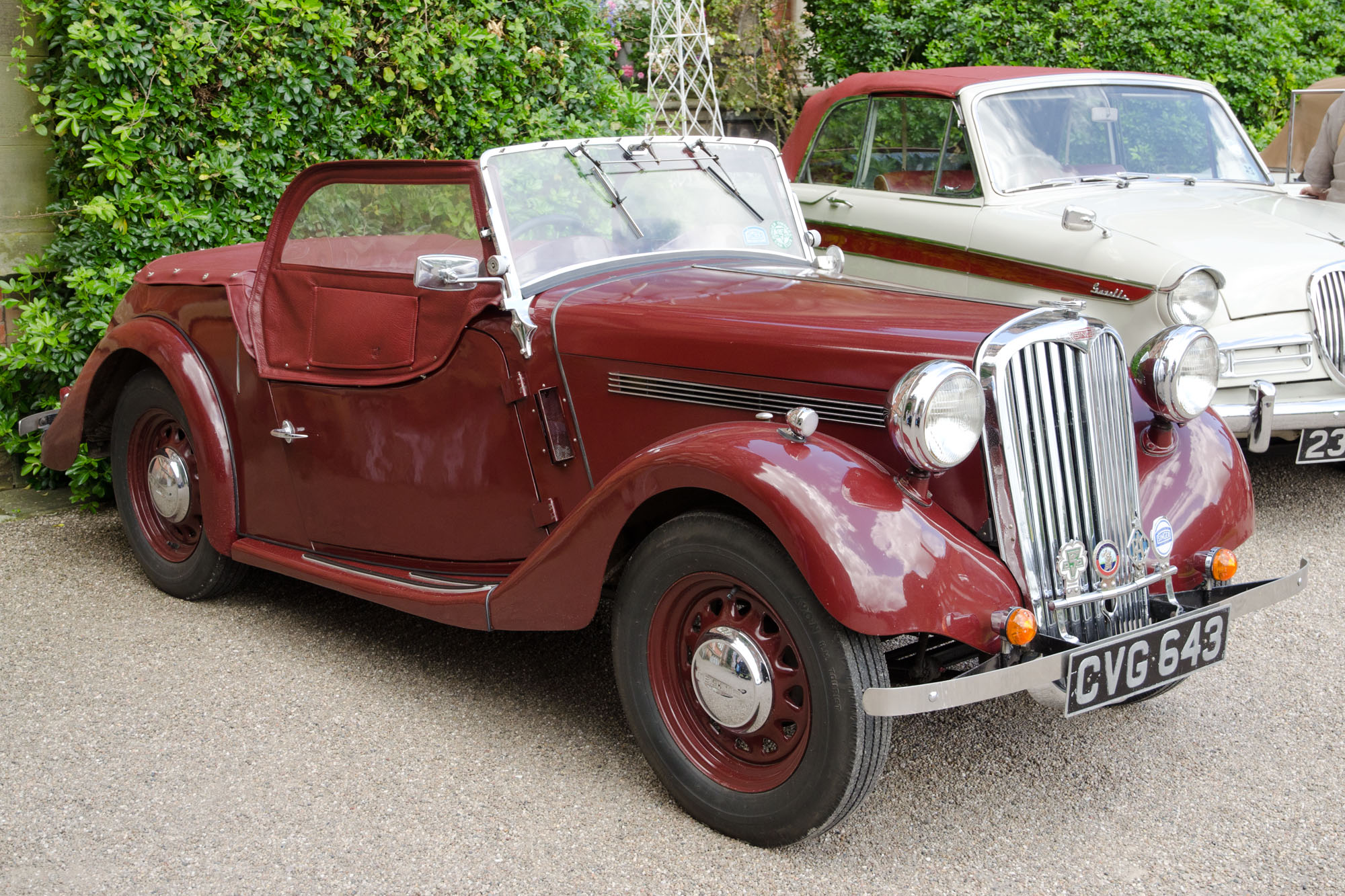
Postwar

== Singer 9 Roadster series 4A 1949-1950 ==
9 Roadster series 4A
- 9 Roadster series 4A 1949

Overview
- Production: 1949-1950; 4122 made

Powertrain
- Engine: 1074 cc I4
- Transmission: 4-speed manual

Chronology
- Predecessor: Singer 9 Roadster
- Successor: Singer 9 Roadster series 4AB; Singer 9 Roadster series 4AC see below

The Roadster was updated to the 1950 4A model in September 1949 by fitting the four speed gearbox from the Singer Hunter. A Solex carburettor replaced the SU used on the previous car, adding one extra horsepower. The driving position was also improved, with easier entry and egress, and the Nine Roadster's awkward gearchange was ameliorated as the gearbox was moved back. The bumpers on the 4A are slightly larger, stronger, and rounded towards the tips.

== Singer 9 Roadster series 4AB and 4AC 1950-1953 ==
9 Roadster series 4AB and 4AC
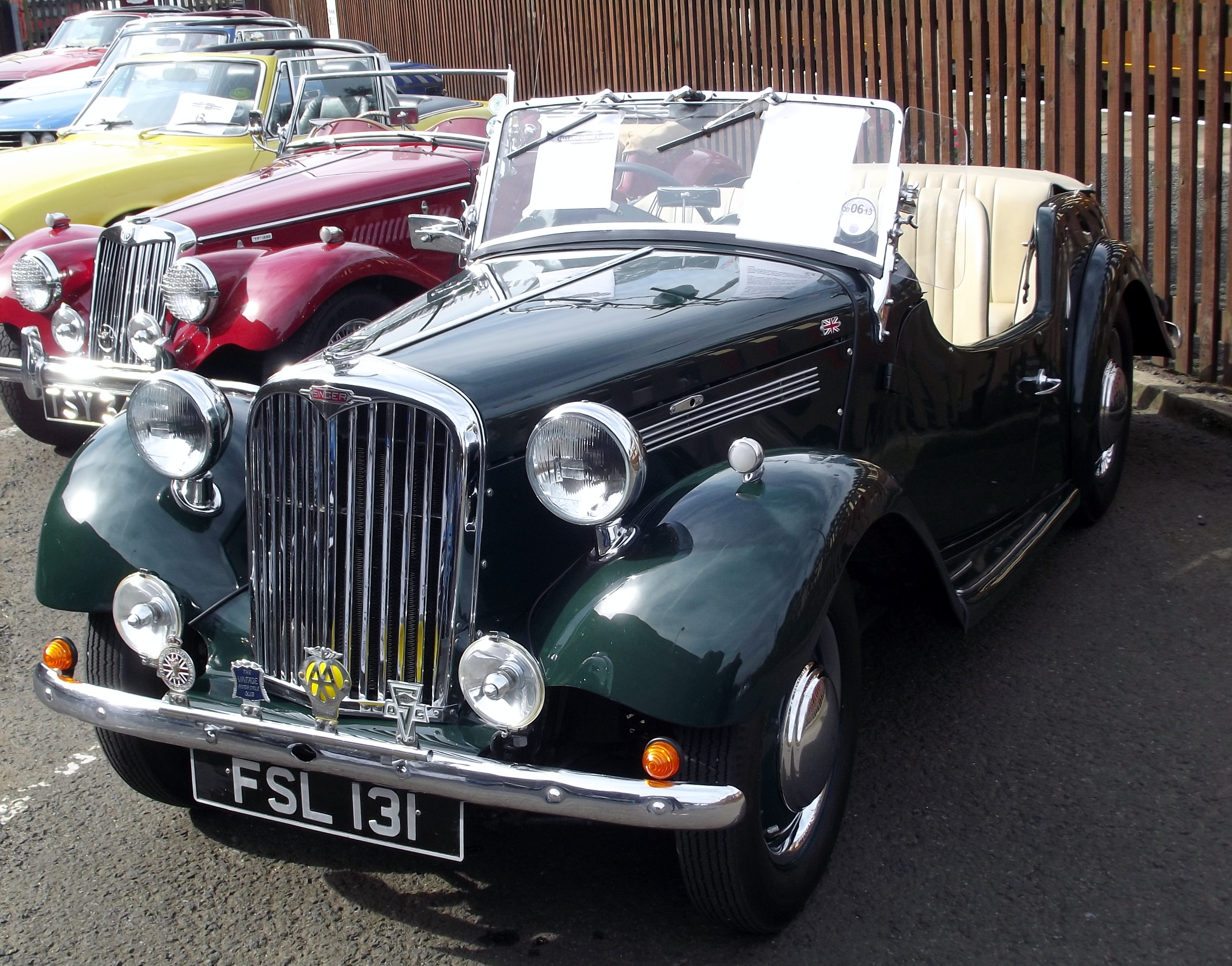
- 9 Roadster series 4AB registered May 1952 1074 cc

Overview
- Production: October 1950-January 1953; 1000 approx made

Powertrain
- Engine: 1074 or 1194 cc SOHC I4
- Transmission: 4-speed manual

Chronology
- Predecessor: Singer 9 Roadster series 4A
- Successor: none. Singer SM Roadster remained in production

By October 1950 the further improved 4AB Roadster appeared. While superficially similar, this has an independent front suspension by coil springs and a hybrid, "hydro-mechanical" brake system by Girling. Externally, there is a shortened bonnet and disc wheels, as well as fixed sides to the bonnet. The fenders were also redesigned, becoming curvier and deeper. The steering box also received alterations, mainly aimed at centering it in the chassis so as to simplify manufacturing alternately right-hand or left-hand driven examples. The 4AB continued in production alongside the larger 4AD until January 1953.

The prototype 4AC (built in about a dozen examples) used a slightly larger 1194 cc engine. This was a down-sleeved version of the 1.5 litre version as fitted to the Singer SM1500, and part of an attempt rationalize Singer's lineup.

registered January 1951 1074 cc

== Singer SM Roadster series 4AD 1½-litre 1951-1955 ==
SM Roadster series 4AD
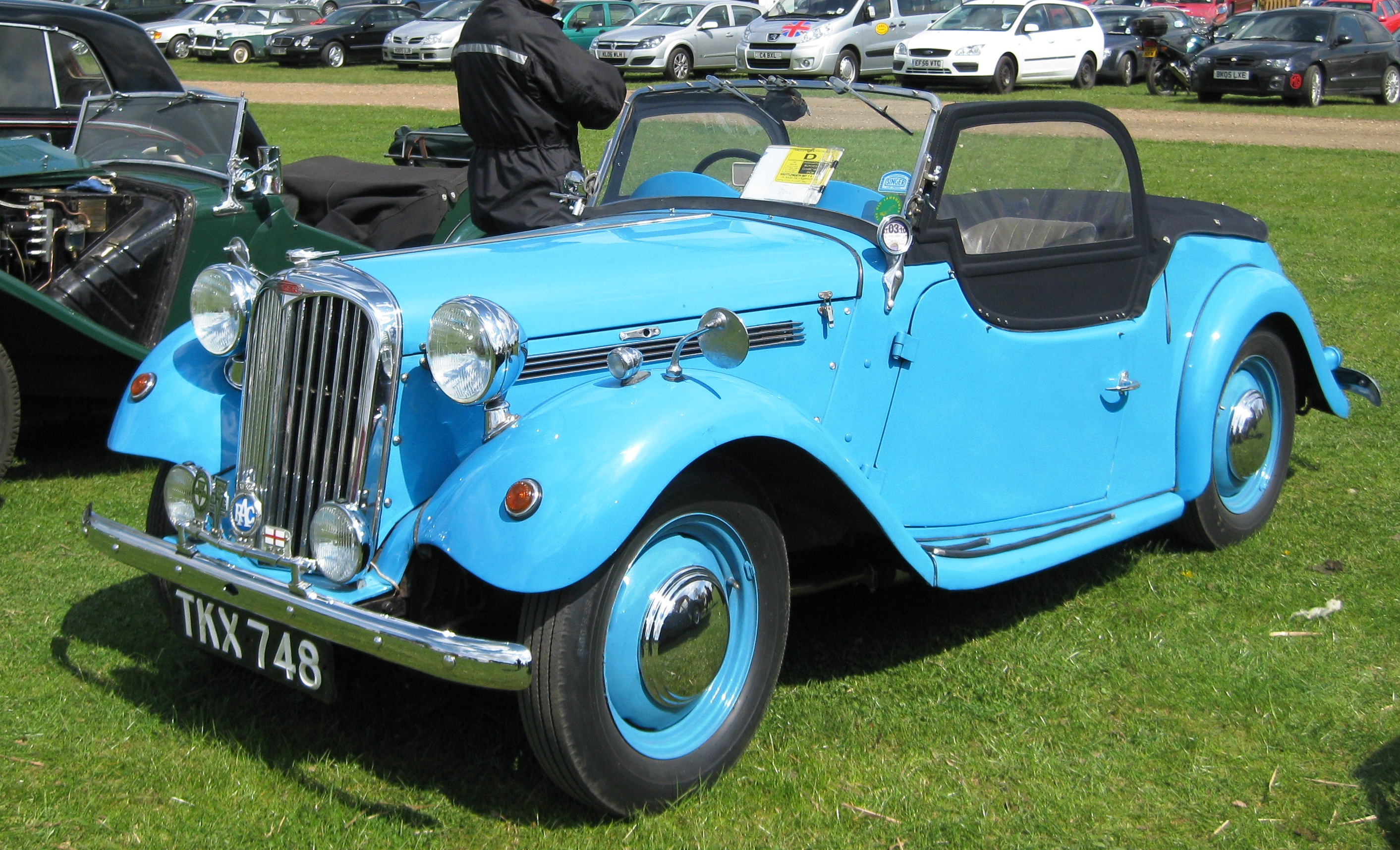
- 1954 Singer SM Roadster series 4AD

Overview
- Also called: Singer SM 1500C (USA)
- Production: 1951-1955; 3440 made

Powertrain
- Engine: 1497 cc 48 bhp I4; 1497 cc 58 bhp I4
- Transmission: 4-speed manual

Chronology
- Predecessor: Singer 9 Roadster series 4A
- Successor: none

The final version of the Roadster, the 4AD, was officially known as the Singer SM Roadster. First seen at the October 1951 Paris Motor Show it was initially intended for export only. It used the 48 hp (36 kW), 1497 cc engine from the SM1500 saloon fitted to a virtually unchanged chassis and body, retaining the hydraulic/mechanical hybrid braking system. A 58 hp (43 kW) twin carburettor engine option was offered from 1953. The 4AD can be told apart from a 4AB by its larger, rounder bumpers, as well as bigger taillights mounted on long stalks.

Although early 4AD production was still all for export, with the smaller 4AB being regularly available in the United Kingdom, from 1953 1.5 litre cars became available on the domestic market as well.

A car tested by The Motor magazine in 1951 had a top speed of 73 mph (117 km/h) and could accelerate from 0-60 mph (97 km/h) in 23.6 seconds. A fuel consumption of 25.8 miles per imperial gallon (10.9 L/100 km; 21.5 mpg_{‑US}) was recorded. No price was quoted for the car as it was for export only.

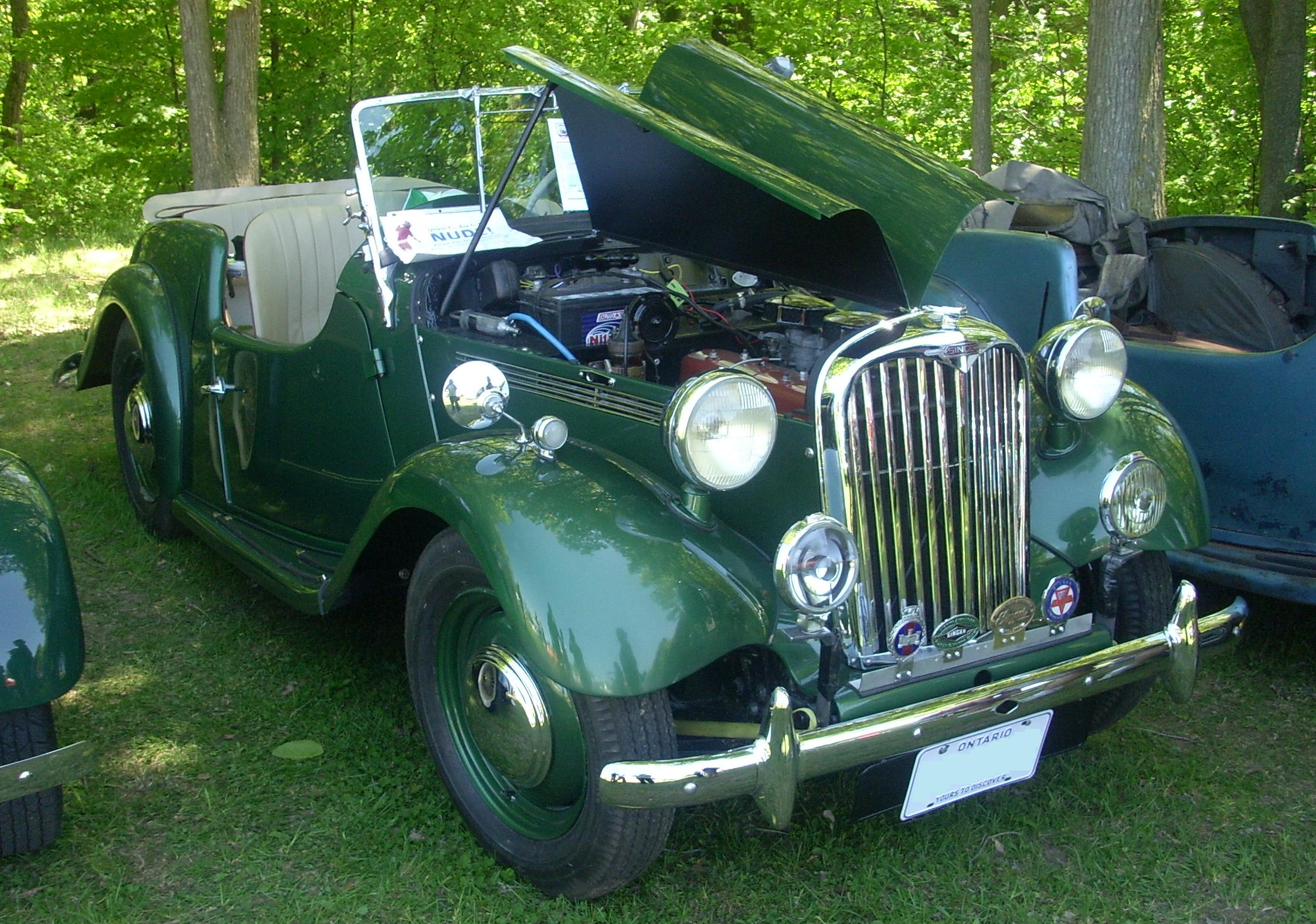
1954 Singer SM Roadster series 4AD, showing the fixed bonnet sides with a divided central portion

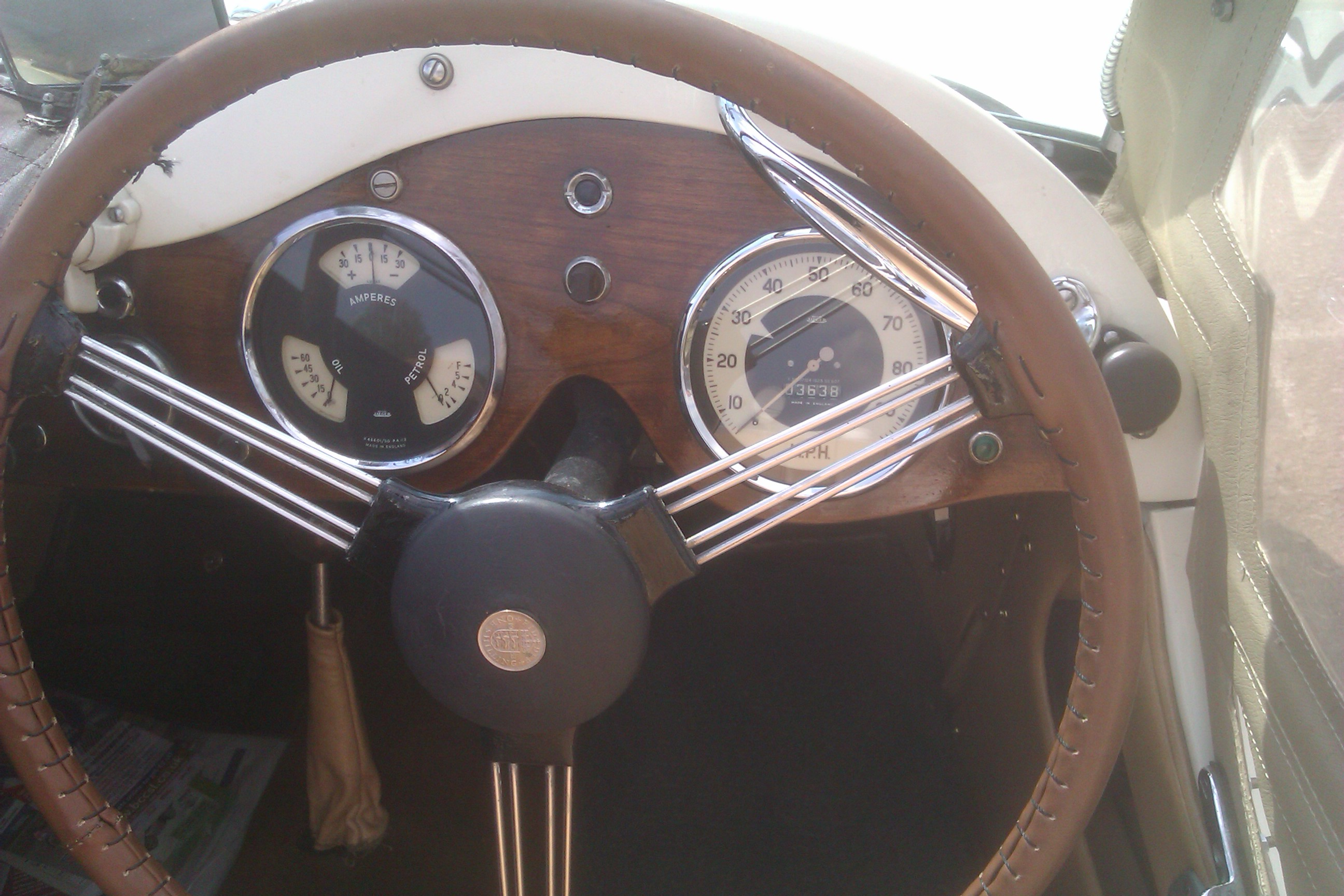
dashboard

== Singer SMX Roadster 1953 ==
This experimental version had a glass fibre body. Displayed at the Earls Court Motor Show in October 1953 probably around 10 were made.

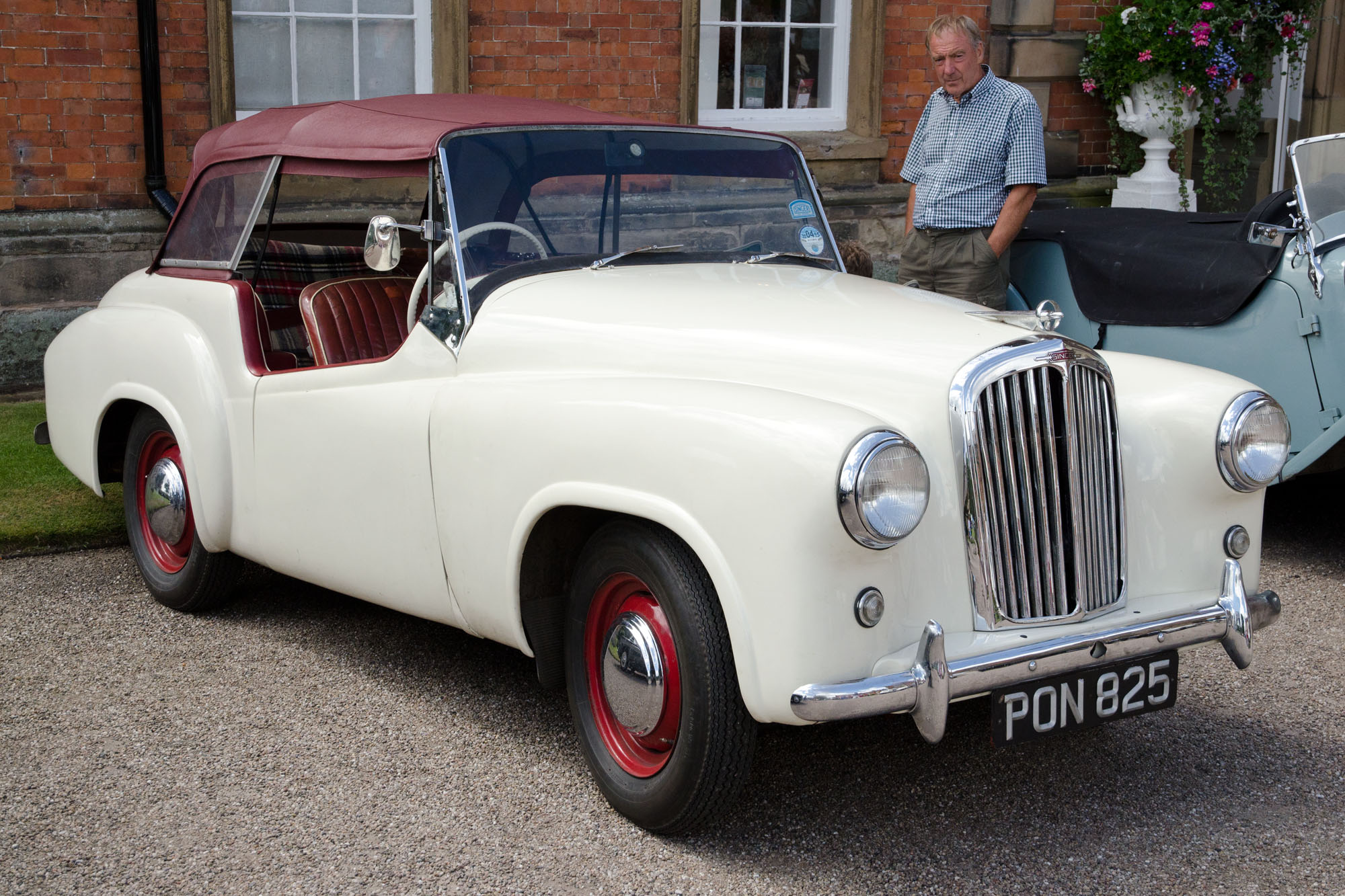
SMX No. 2 registered

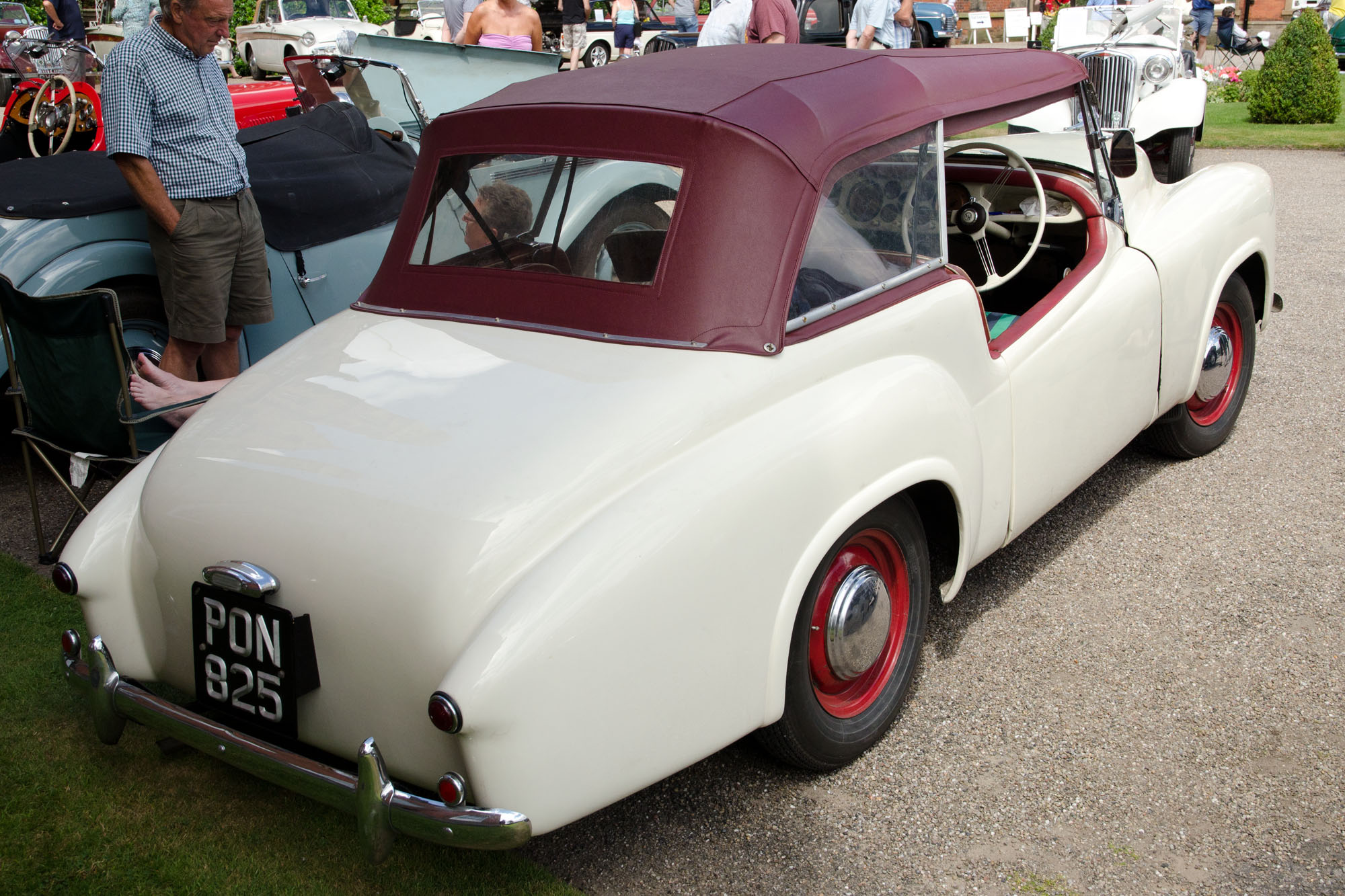
1 January 1955
