= 1939 Australian Stock Car Road Championship =

Layout of the Lobethal Circuit (1937–1948)

The 1939 Australian Stock Car Road Championship took place at the Lobethal Circuit in South Australia on 2 January 1939. The race, which covered a total of 50 miles over six laps of the 8.6-mile course, was conducted under a handicap format where the slowest cars began the race first, while the fastest started last.

The race was open to standard touring and sports cars, fitted with standard equipment and operating on standard first grade fuel. The only modifications permitted to the cars were the raising of the compression ratio and alterations to the suspension.

The race was won by Tom Brady driving a Singer Bantam.

== Results ==
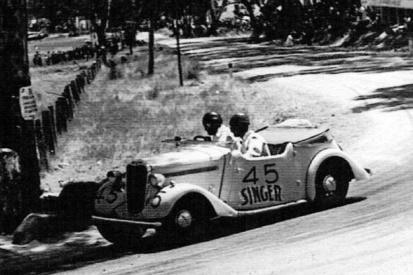
Tom Brady won the championship driving a Singer Bantam

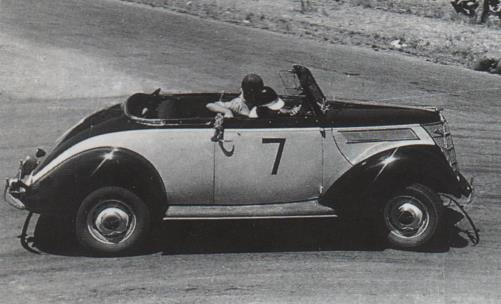
Jack McKinnon placed second driving a Ford V8

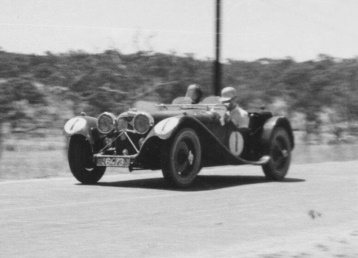
G.Brownsworth placed fourth, set the fastest race time and set the fastest lap driving an SS Jaguar 100

Position	Driver	No.	Car	Entrant	Finishing time	Handicap	Actual racing time	Laps
1	Tom Brady	45	Singer Bantam	T. M. Brady	55:08	11 mins	54:08	6
2	Jack McKinnon	7	Ford V8	J. McKinnon	55:46	3 mins	46:46	6
3	Ted Parsons	5	Ford V8	J. K. Phillips	56:07	3 mins	47:07	6
4	G. Brownsworth	1	SS Jaguar 100	G. Brownsworth	57:27	Scratch	45:27	6
5	D. E. Hutton	15	Morris 8/40	D. E. Hutton	59:15	12 mins	59:15	6
Ret.	R. Uffindell	14	Austin 8	R. Uffindell		12 mins		5
Ret.	Frank Kleinig	3	Hudson	W. A. McIntyre		Scratch		5
Ret.	John Snow	2	Hudson	J. F. Snow		Scratch		5
Ret.	S. A. Osborne	29	MG T-type	S. A. Osborne		5 mins		2
Ret.	Owen Dibbs	12	MG T-type	Mrs C. Jacques		5 mins		2
Ret.	K. N. Brooks	13	Wolseley	K. N. Brooks		5 mins		2
Ret.	Selwyn Haig	10	MG 18/80 "Tiger"	S. R. Haig		4 mins		2
DNS	J. McGowan	9	Ford V8	J. McGowan		3 mins		-

=== Race notes ===
- Race distance: 50 miles
- Number of entries: 18
- Number of starters: 12
- Number of finishers: 5
- Fastest time: G Brownsworth, SS Jaguar 100, 45:27
- Fastest race lap: G Brownsworth, SS Jaguar 100, 7:27, 71 mph
