= Model year =

Production date of a commercial product

The model year (sometimes abbreviated as MY) is a method of describing the version of a product which has been produced over multiple years. The model year may or may not be the same as the calendar year in which the product was manufactured.

== Automobiles ==
=== United States and Canada ===
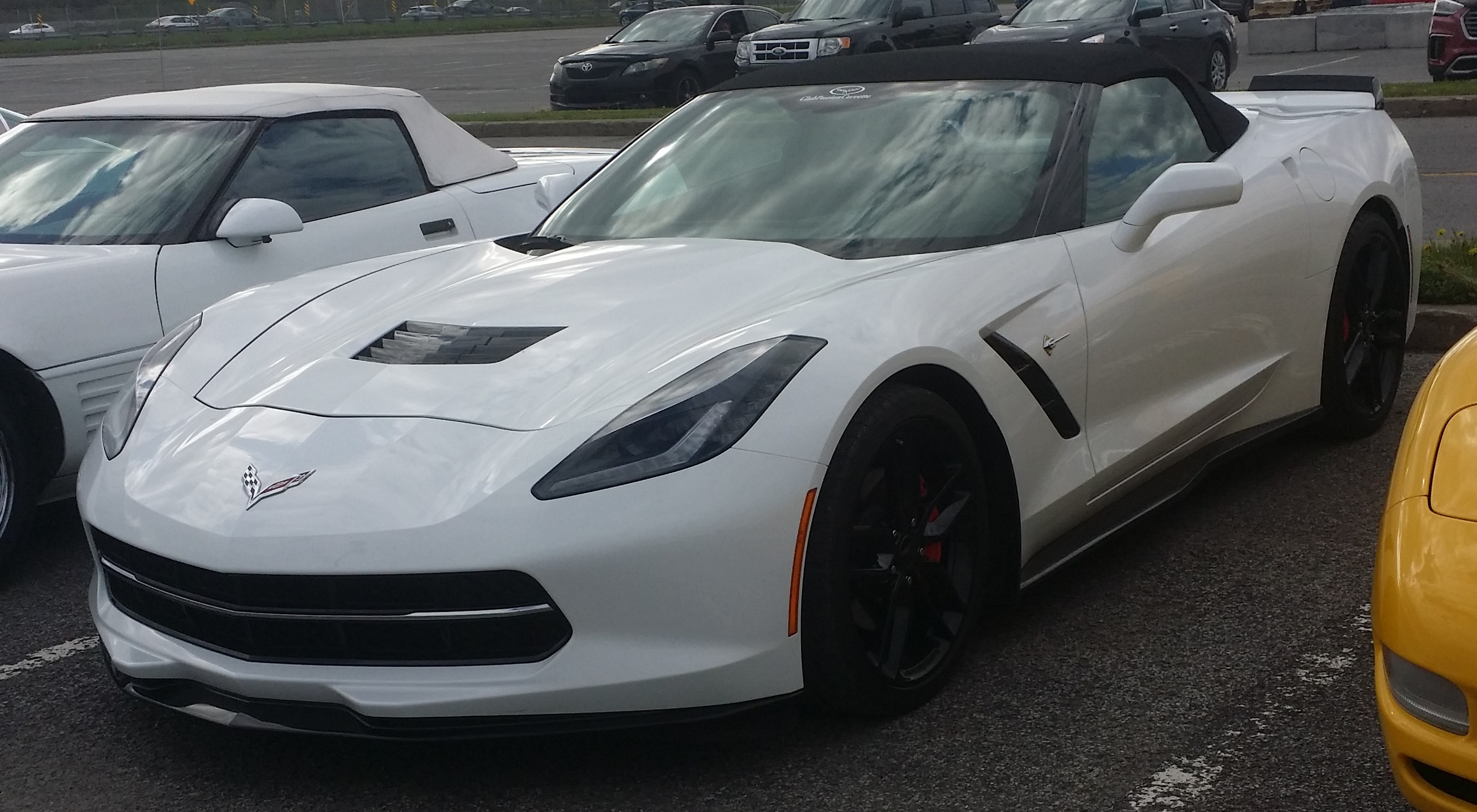
MY2019 Chevrolet Corvette

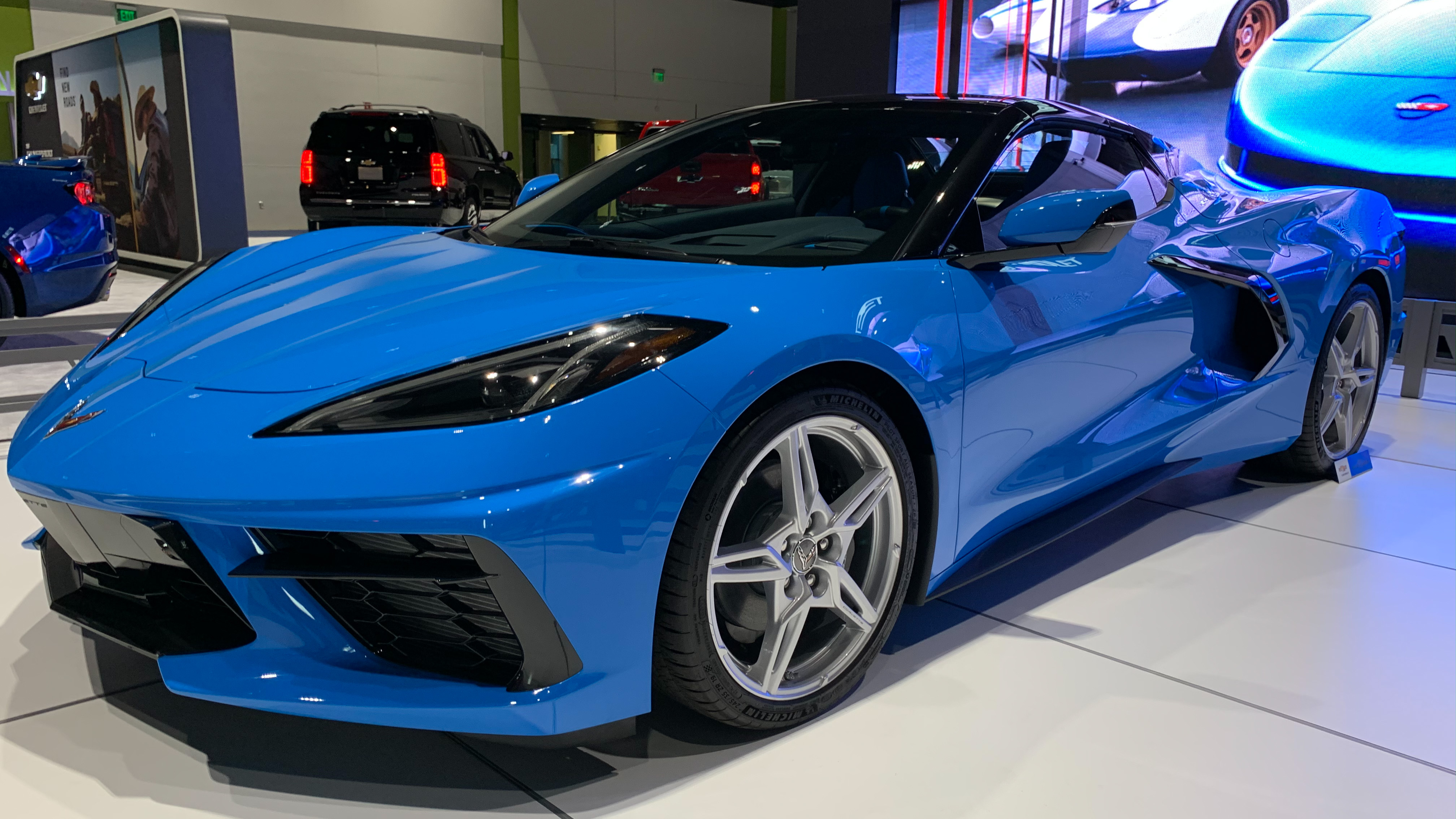
MY2020 Chevrolet Corvette

Automobiles in the United States and Canada are identified and regulated by model year, whereas other markets use production date (month/year) to identify specific vehicles, and model codes in place of the "year" (model year) in the North American make-model-year identifier.

Imported cars use the model year convention in the U.S. and Canada, even when this system is not used for the same cars when sold in other countries.

In technical documents generated within the auto industry and its regulating agencies such as the U.S. National Highway Traffic Safety Administration and United States Environmental Protection Agency and Transport Canada and Environment Canada, the letters MY often precede the year (as in MY2019 or MY93). Even without this prefix, however, in the North American context it is usually the model year rather than the vehicle's calendar year of production that is being referred to.

The new model year typically begins in August to September of the preceding calendar year (though can be as early as January, such being the case for the fourth generation 2022 Acura MDX, which started production in January 2021). This is partly due to the advertising of a new model being coordinated with the launch of the new television season in late September, because of the heavy dependence between television to offer products from automakers to advertise, and the car companies to launch their new models at a high-profile time of year.

The concept of yearly styling updates (a practice adopted from the fashion industry) was introduced to General Motors' range of cars by Alfred P. Sloan in the 1920s. This was an early form of planned obsolescence in the car industry, where yearly styling changes meant consumers could easily discern a car's newness, or lack of it. Other major changes to the model range usually coincided with the launch of the new model year, for example the 1928 model year of the Ford Model A began production in October 1927 and the 1955 model year of the Ford Thunderbird began production in September 1954.

Model year followed with calendar year until the mid 1930s until then president Franklin D. Roosevelt signed an executive order to release vehicle model years in the fall of the preceding year in order to standardize employment in the automotive industry. The practice of beginning production of next year's model before the end of the year has become a long-standing tradition in America.

For purposes such as VINs and emissions control, regulations allow cars of a given model year to be sold starting on January 2 of the previous calendar year. For example, a 2019 model year vehicle can legally go on sale starting January 2, 2018. This has resulted in a few cars in the following model year being introduced in advertisements during the NFL Super Bowl in February. A notable example of an early model year launch would be the Ford Mustang, introduced as an early 1965 model (informally referred to as "1964 1/2") in April 1964 at the World's Fair, several months before the usual start of the 1965 model year in August 1964.

For recreational vehicles, the U.S. Federal Trade Commission allows a manufacturer to assign a vehicle a model year that is up to two years later than its date of manufacture.

=== Other countries ===
In other countries, it is more common to identify specific vehicles by their year and month of production, and cars of a particular type by their generation, using terms such as "Mark III" or by the manufacturer's code for that kind of car (such as "BL" being the code for a Mazda 3 built between November 2008 and June 2013).

In Europe, the lesser use of model years as a descriptor is partly because since the 1980s many vehicles are introduced at the Geneva Motor Show in March, the Frankfurt Motor Show in September or the Paris Motor Show in September. New models have increasingly been launched in June or July.

As with the rest of Europe, the motor industry in the United Kingdom did not regularly make use of model years in the way common in the US, since cars were not as regularly updated or altered. Some exceptions existed; for instance in the 1950s and 1960s the Rootes Group deliberately copied American practice and performed annual small alterations to its key models such as the Hillman Minx and the Humber Super Snipe. However these were still not identified by model years but by Series numbers, sometimes with alphabetical designations (such as the Minx Series IIIA, IIIB and IIIC) to distinguish what were mostly cosmetic updates rather than mechanical or structural improvements. As in America, the British motor industry did generally announce new models (or updates to existing ones) in September. However this was the norm long before it became practice in the US and did not originate with the television season. Instead it began because the long-established practice in the manufacturing industries of the English Midlands, especially Coventry and Birmingham where the British car industry developed out of the established bicycle and machine tool trades, was to close factories and give workers a two-week holiday in August or September. This was used as a chance to renew tooling in the factory and was an ideal time to introduce new products which would begin production when the workers returned and the factory restarted. Thus the working year in the car industry ran from September to September. New or improved models would be announced in the summer and would be displayed at the British Motor Show which was held in October. Here they would be seen by the wider industry and buying public for the first time, just as the cars produced in the previous weeks began reaching the dealerships ready for sale. Therefore, car models intended for sale during, say, 1960, would be announced and displayed in the third quarter of 1959, with sales beginning before the end of the year, and any improvements intended for 1961 would be announced in September 1960 and displayed at the 1960 Motor Show in October.

This convention was not absolute; for instance the original Vauxhall Victor was officially announced in February 1957 with sales beginning later the same month, and subsequent additions and updates to the Victor range were all introduced in February - notably Vauxhall's factory was outside the traditional centre of the industry, being in Luton, and so did not follow the common working calendar. Being owned by General Motors, Vauxhall also generally made minor changes to its cars year by year, even referring to 'model years' in some of its literature, but these did not have the same official weight or significant to buyers as they did in America. During the 1960s, British car makers began giving journalists access to upcoming models earlier in the year to get announcements out ahead of their rivals and clear of the busy September period. This developed into increasingly lavish and sophisticated media and marketing events happening earlier and earlier in the year. Changes to working practices, the in-roads made to the British market by car makers from other countries and the decline in market share by British firms finally led to the tradition of new models being introduced in September being abandoned, although the British Motor Show continued to be held in October.

=== VIN encoding ===
The standardized format of the vehicle identification number (VIN) used in the United States and Canada includes the model year of the vehicle as the 10th digit. The actual date that the vehicle was produced is not part of the VIN, but it is required to be shown on the vehicle safety certification label.

== Other products ==
In addition to automobiles, some other products that often have model years include:

- Airplanes
- All-terrain vehicles
- Bicycles
- Golf carts
- Heavy equipment
- Mobile homes
- Motorcycles
- Recreational vehicles
- Semi-trailer trucks
- Snowmobiles
- Tractors
- Trailers
- Watercraft

== See also ==
- Car model
- Vehicle emission standard
- Cover date
