= Humber Pullman =

Humber Pullman Humber Imperial
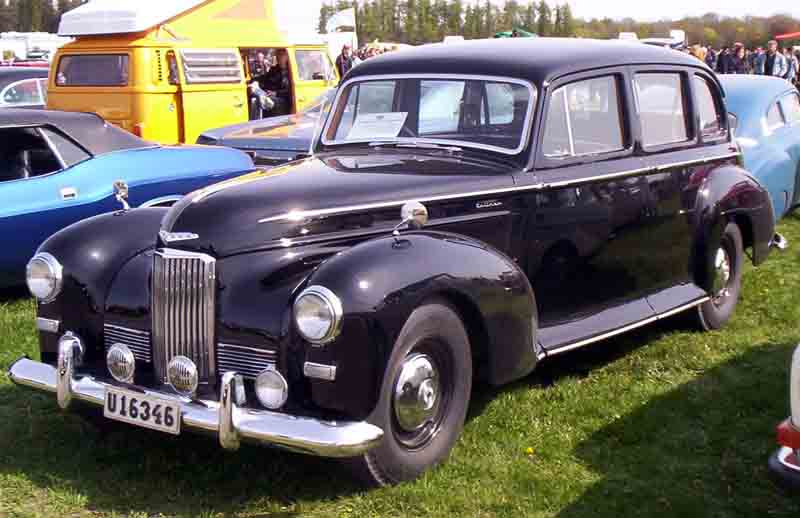
- Post war Humber Pullman

Overview
- Manufacturer: Humber Limited
- Production: 1930–1940; 1945–1954; 1964–1967

Body and chassis
- Related: Humber Snipe

Chronology
- Predecessor: Humber 20/65hp

The Humber Pullman is a four-door limousine which was introduced by the British Humber company in 1930 as a successor to the Humber 20/65 hp and long-wheelbase version of the Humber Snipe.

In 1939 an upgraded version was launched badged as the Humber Imperial, but postwar the car reverted to the Pullman name. Between 1948 and 1954 the car was offered with a central partition (for chauffeured use) as the Pullman, but without a partition it was badged as the Humber Imperial (intended for owner-drivers).

The Pullman / Imperial was not offered for sale to the public during the Second World War; the factory's limited output were used as staff cars. It returned to the market in 1945 and remained in production until 1954.

In 1964 the company revived the Humber Imperial name for a top-of-the-line model based on the Humber Super Snipe. It remained in production through to 1967.

== Before World War II ==
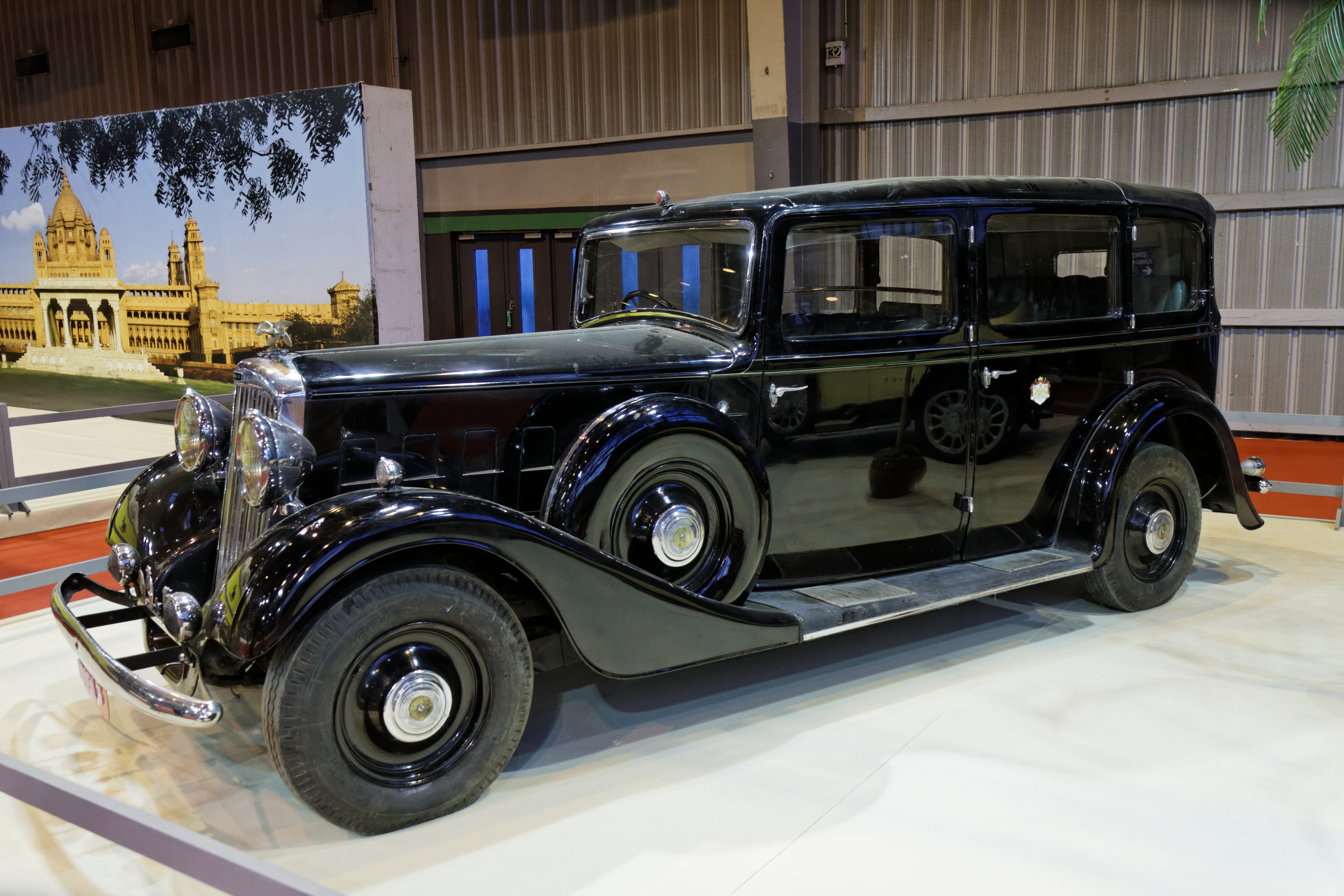
Snipe 80 1934 with landaulette body by Thrupp & Maberly

The 1930 car came with a 3498cc straight six cylinder overhead inlet side exhaust valve engine and a claimed power output of 80 hp (60 kW). The classic limousine style body featured rear- hinged doors and in some respects resembled the Humber Snipe 80 with which it shared its engine, but the Pullman was longer and wider. For this heavy car Humber claimed a top speed of 73 mph (117 km/h). As well as the limousine, Landaulette and Sedanca de Ville bodies were available. Humber, the manufacturer lost its independence in 1931 when the Rootes Group acquired a majority share holding in it. A coupé was added to the body range in 1935 for one year only.

A rebodied Pullman with two-piece V windscreen appeared in 1936, sharing the 132 in (3,353 mm) wheelbase of its predecessor, but with the overall length of the car increased to 196 in (4,978 mm). Engine size was now raised to 4086cc while claimed power was 100 hp (75 kW). The power increase was also evident from the claimed top speed which now edged up to 75 mph (121 km/h). The chassis gained independent front suspension, and hydraulic brakes were fitted in 1940. As well as the factory body options, some cars were supplied in chassis form to independent coachbuilders, especially Thrupp & Maberly.

In 1939 the Pullman was joined by the Humber Imperial or Snipe Imperial which shared the engine with the Pullman, but was built on the 4 in (102 mm) shorter Snipe chassis and correspondingly brisker, with an advertised top speed of 81 mph (130 km/h). The car nevertheless remained spacious, and was favoured for use by British government ministers during the 1940s. Four and Six-light saloons and drophead coupé bodies were available. Civilian availability ended in 1940 when the factory was given over to production of the ’Ironside’ Reconnaissance Car. However, production of the newly introduced "razor-edge" Pullman continued throughout the war for the government and the military.

== After World War II ==
The Pullman returned to the market in 1945 with seven-seat limousine and landaulette bodies, to be replaced in 1948 by a reworked and lengthened version on a lengthened chassis and designated the Humber Pullman Mk II. From 1948 the car was available with or without a partition between the front and rear of the cabin. The version with a division retained the Pullman name, while for the mechanically identical owner-driver version the Humber Imperial name was now revived. The headlamps were no longer standalone but fitted into the wings.

The Mark III version introduced in 1951 was little changed from the Mark II, apart from being even longer and having an all-synchromesh gearbox. At 212 in (5,385 mm) the Mk III Humber Pullman was the same length as the Rolls-Royce Silver Cloud which would emerge from Crewe in 1955. A total of 2200 Mk II and III Pullmans, and 1526 Imperials, were manufactured.

In 1953 more power was offered for the Mark IV Pullmans and Imperials, still with straight six cylinder engines, but now of 4139cc with overhead valves, and published power output of 113 hp (84 kW) or 116 hp (87 kW). Production ended in 1954.

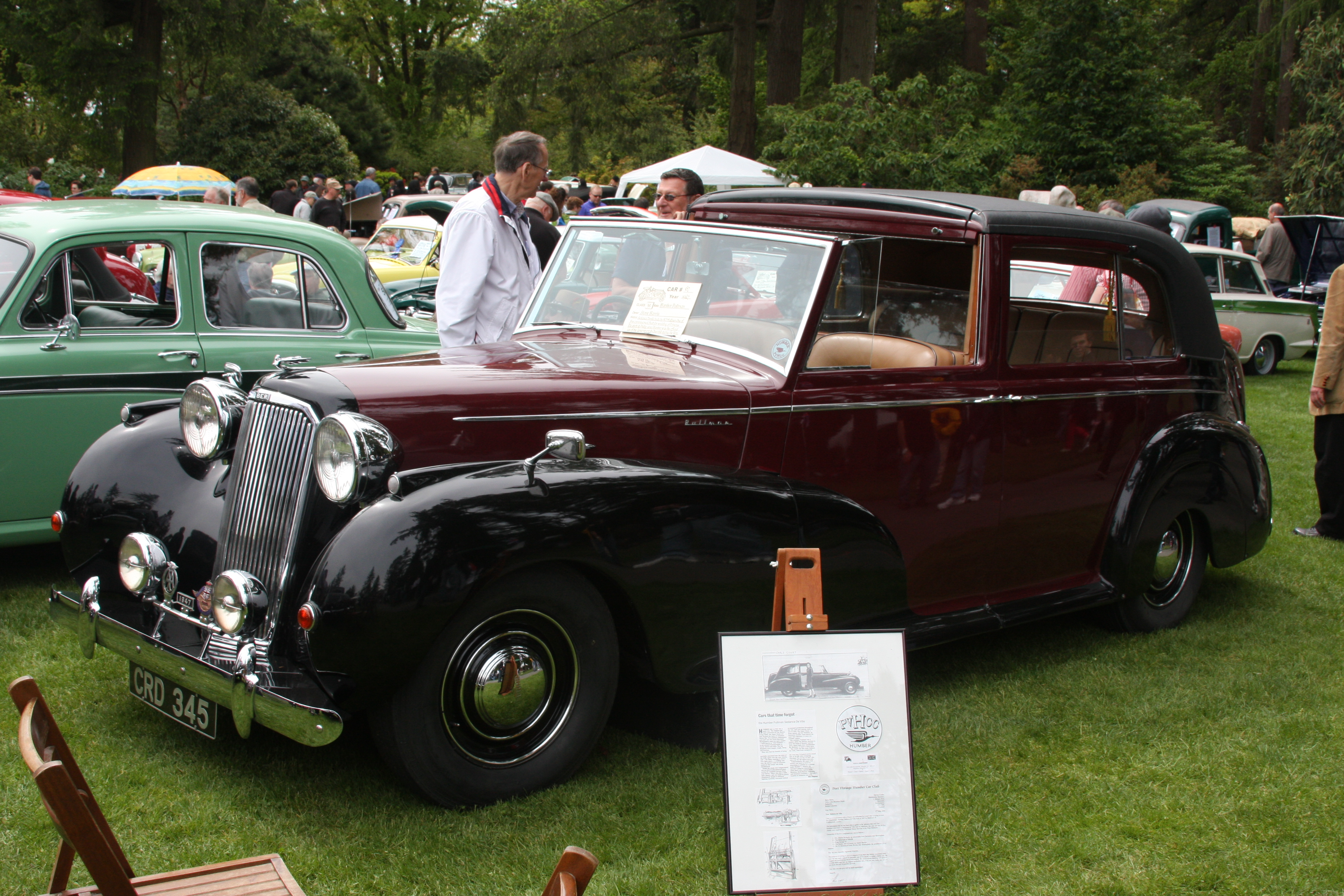
1947 Humber Pullman Sedanca de Ville

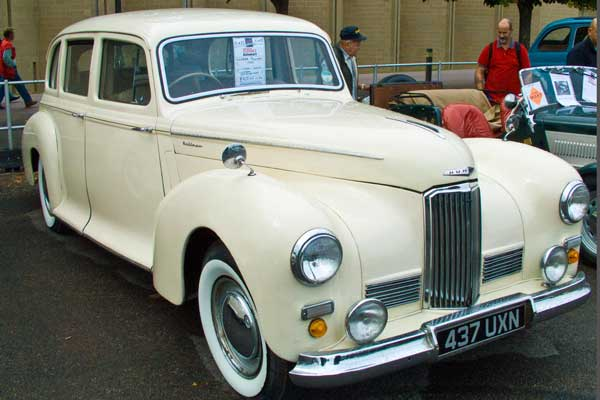
1949 Humber Pullman Mark II

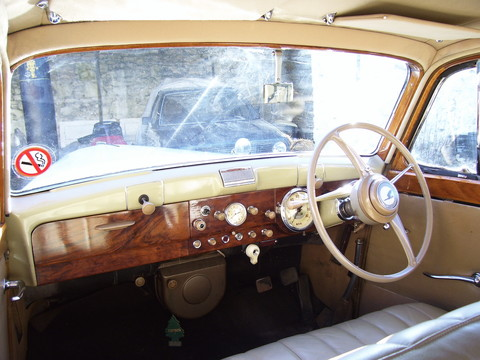
Dashboard of 1949 Humber Pullman MkII

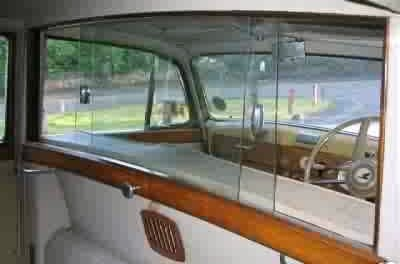
Glass division in 1950 Humber Pullman MkII

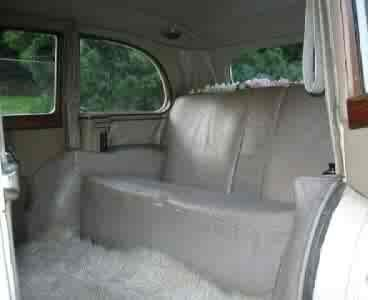
Rear seating of 1950 Humber Pullman MkII

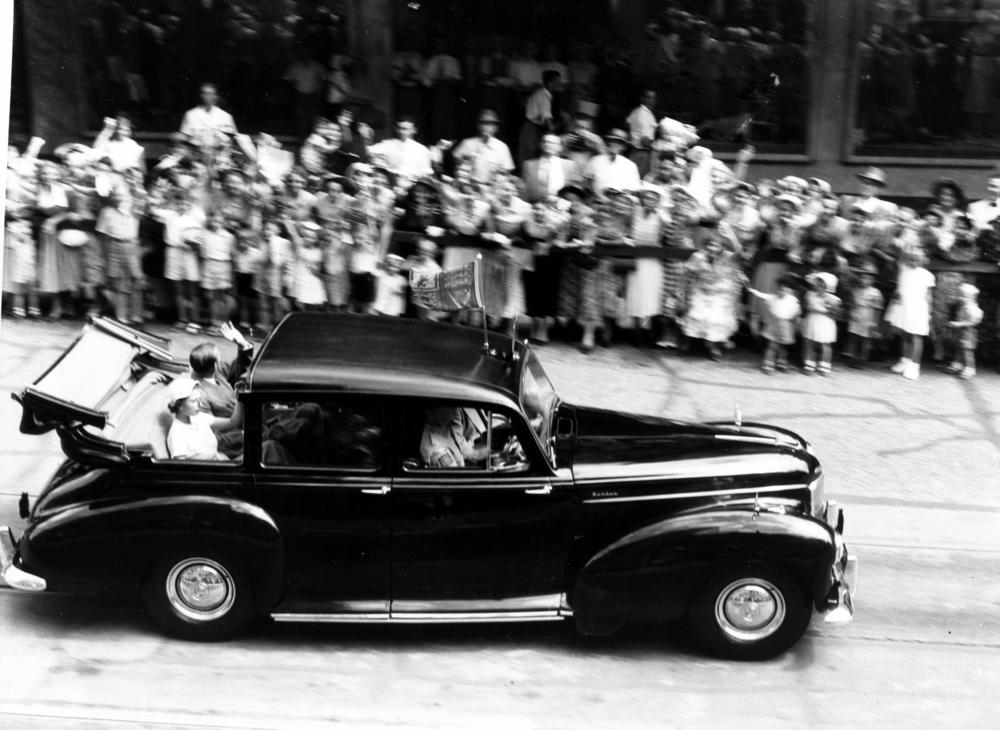
Queen Elizabeth II and Prince Philip in a Humber Pullman, Brisbane, 1954

== Imperial revival ==
In 1964 the company revived the Humber Imperial name for a top-of-the-line Humber Super Snipe, distinguished by a slightly lower different-shaped coupé-like vinyl-clad roof. Automatic transmission was standard and there was a more luxuriously appointed interior. The range of large Humbers, including the Imperial, was withdrawn by Rootes in 1967.

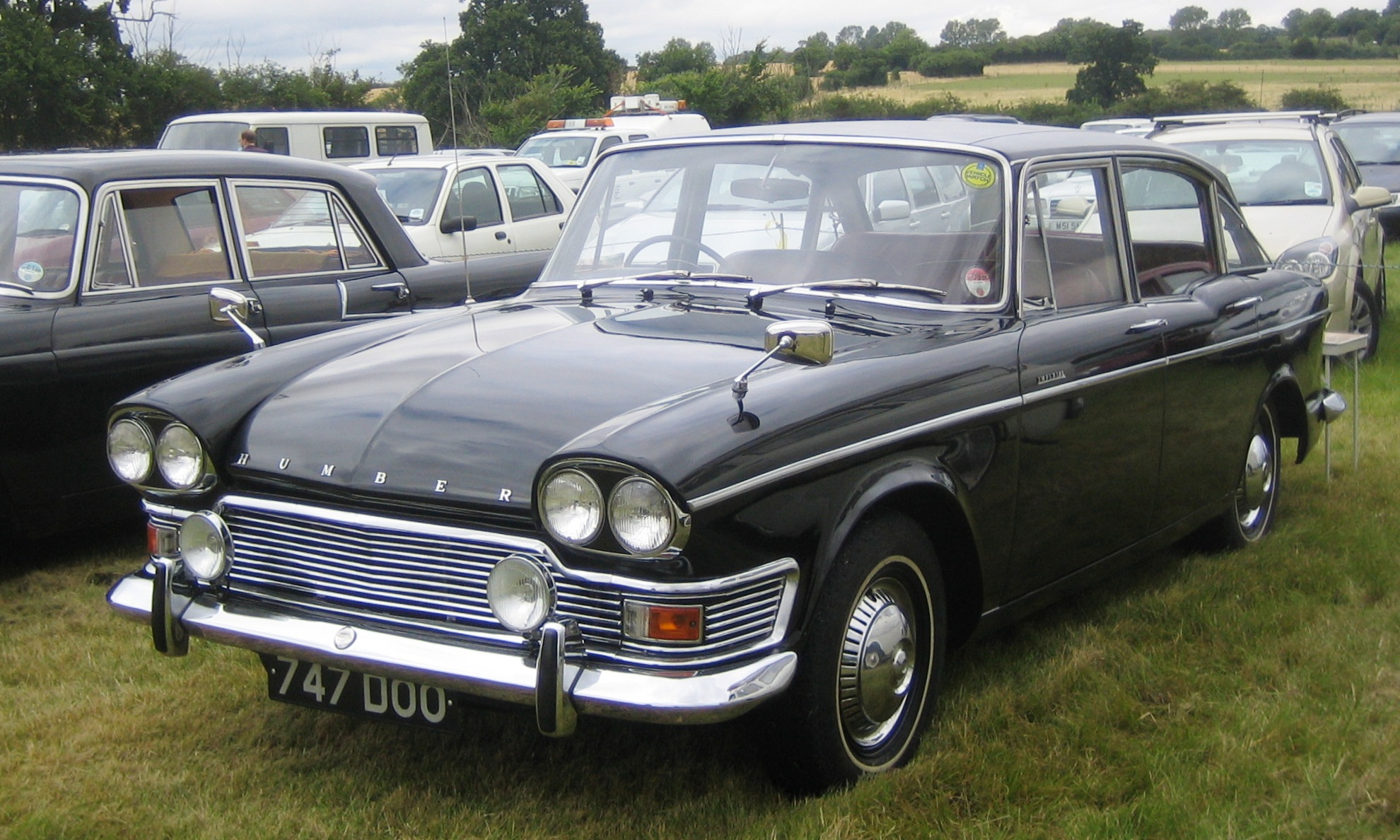
1964-1967 Humber Imperial

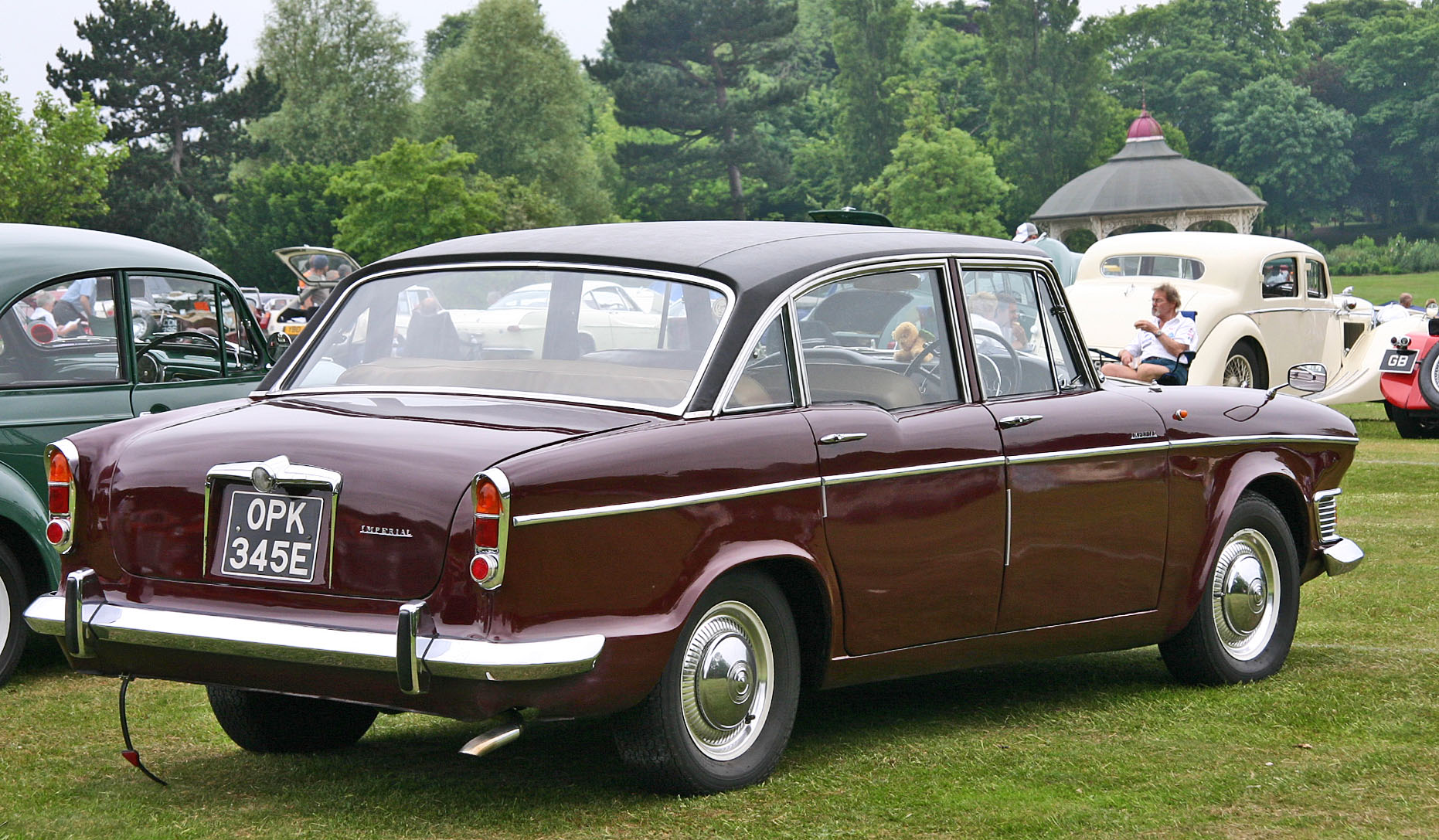
1964-1967 Humber Imperial
