= Humber Snipe =

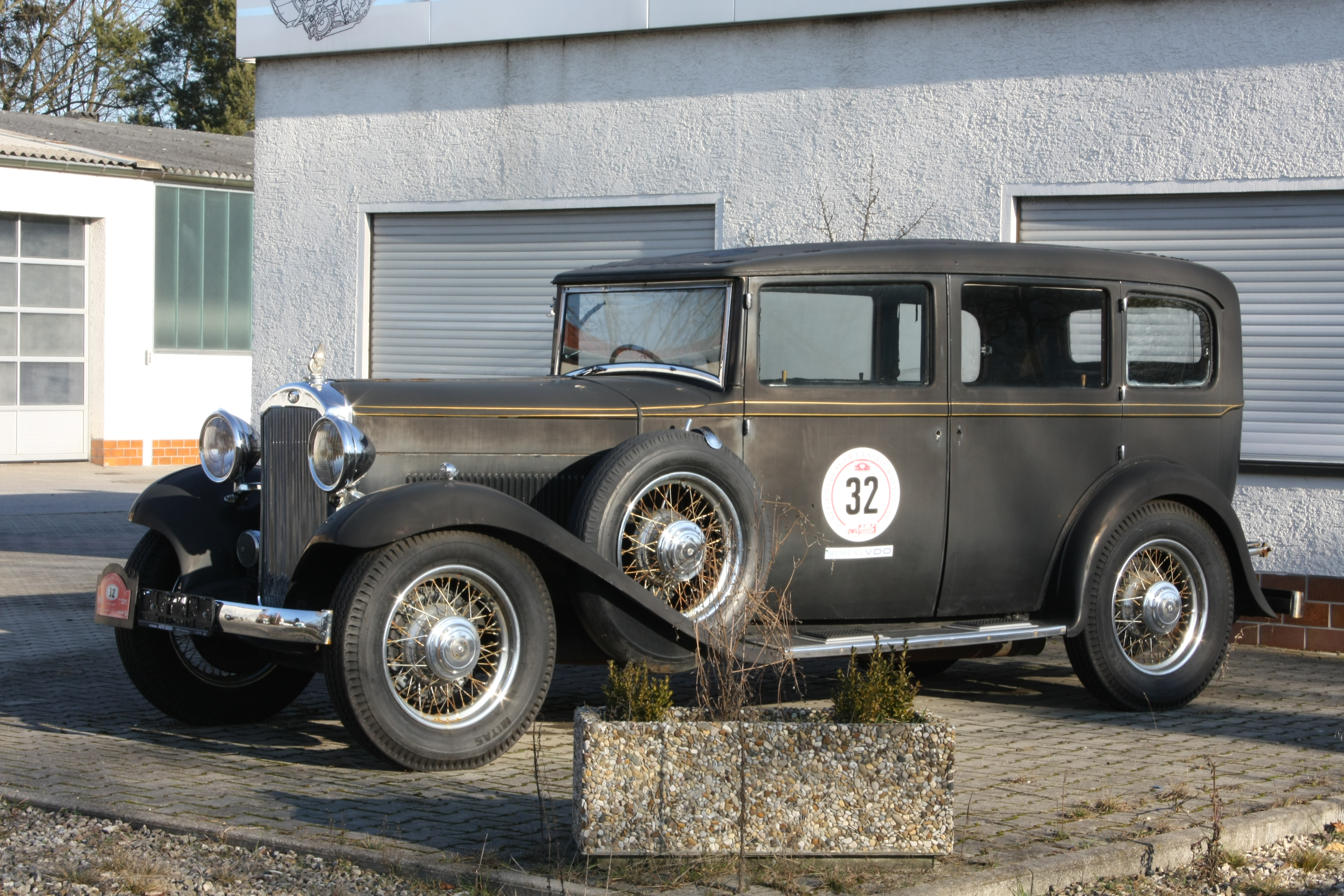
- Snipe saloon early 1932

Overview
- Manufacturer: Humber; Rootes Group (after 1931)
- Production: 1930–1940; 1945–1948

Body and chassis
- Related: Humber Pullman

Chronology
- Predecessor: Humber 20/55hp

The Humber Snipe was a four-door luxury saloon introduced by British-based Humber Limited for 1930 as a successor to the Humber 20/55 hp (which remained in the catalogue as 20/65) at the same time as the similar but slightly longer Humber Pullman.

The first Humber Snipe was launched in September 1929 under the banner headline "Such Cars As Even Humber Never Built Before". It showed the influence of William Rootes' marketing skills following the appointment of Rootes Limited as Humber's "World Exporters" and also a significant similarity to his Hillmans. Almost three years later Humber Limited joined what became known as the Rootes Group as part of a necessary restructure of Humber's capital and ownership in July 1932.

Snipes and, later, Super Snipes became Rootes Group's owner-driver big car offerings until the brand disappeared under Chrysler ownership.

== 1930–1935: Snipe 80 ==
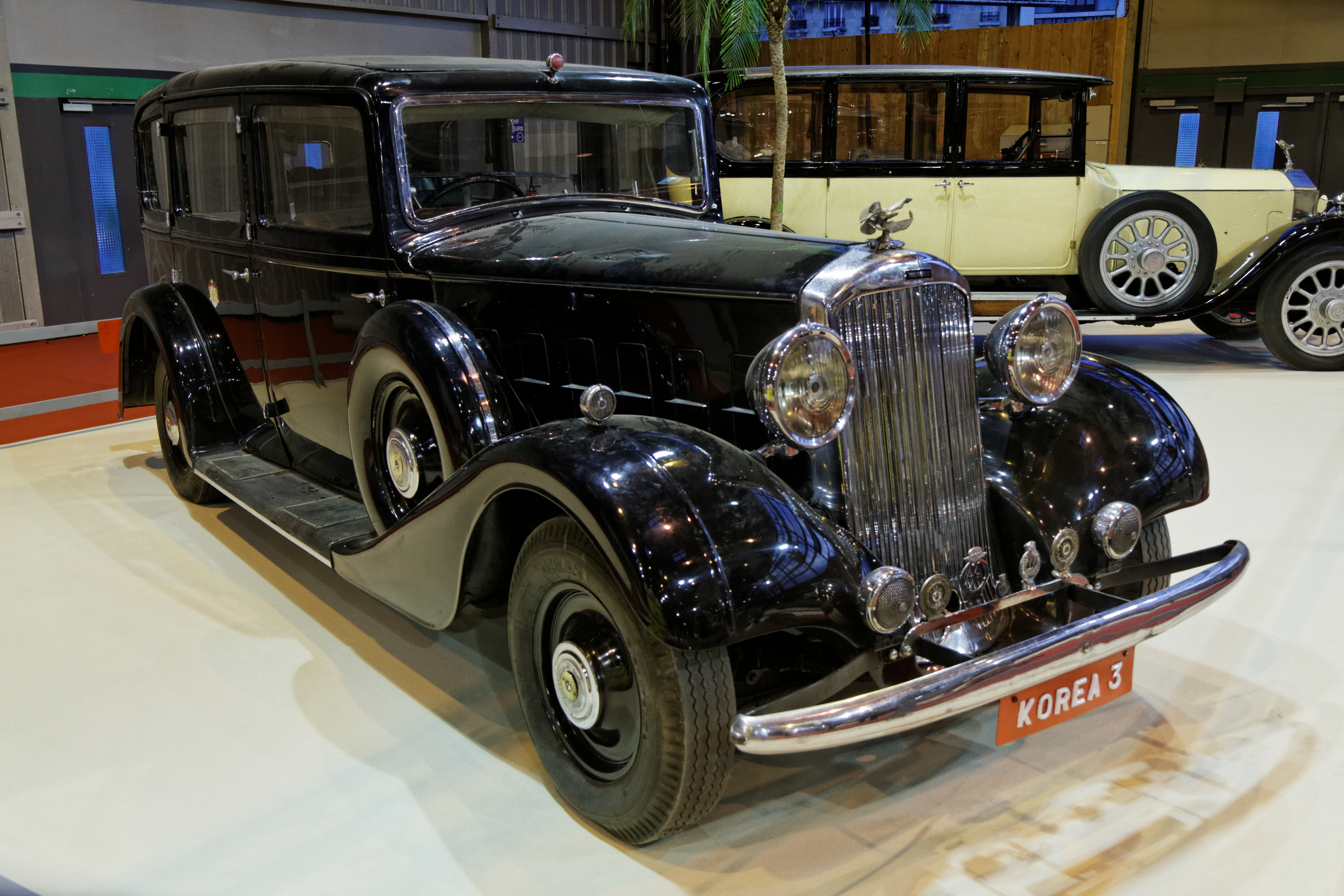
Thrupp & Maberly landaulette 1932

The Snipe, or from late 1932, Snipe 80 featured a 3498-cc six-cylinder engine of 80 mm bore and 116 mm stroke with the overhead-inlet, side-exhaust valve gear that had been a feature of the company's six-cylinder engines since the mid-1920s. A single Stromberg carburettor was fitted. The four speed transmission had a right hand change lever (right hand drive cars) until 1931 when it moved to the centre of the car facilitating the production of left hand drive examples. The shutters on the radiator grille were opened and closed thermostatically to control the flow of cooling air. For 1933 the engine was redesigned to have overhead valves producing an extra 5 bhp. Bendix mechanical brakes were fitted.

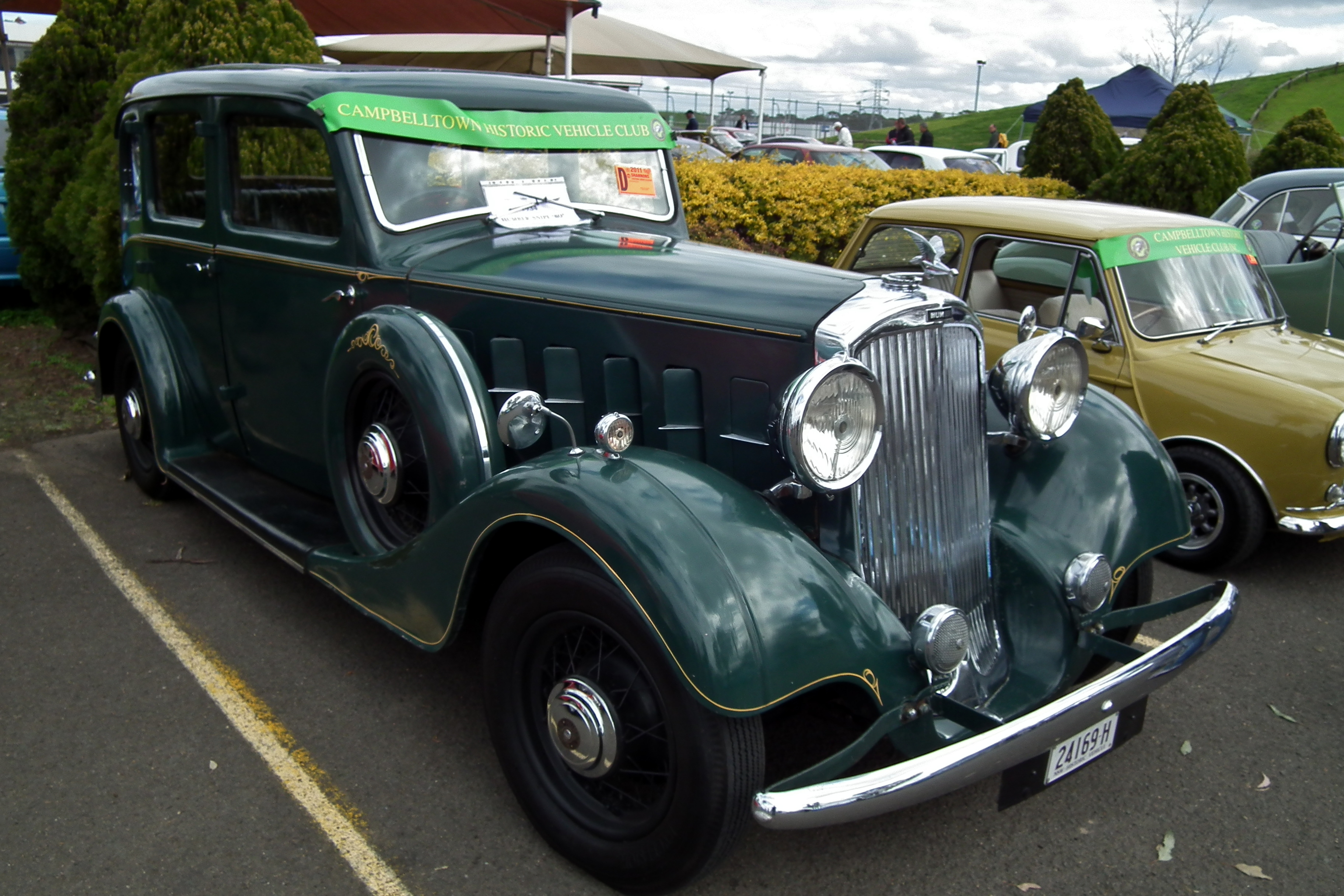
Snipe 80 1934

The conservatively boxy 4 or 6 light saloon body with spare wheels mounted on the front wings incorporated rear-hinged doors for back passengers. A fabric saloon (until 1930), sports saloon, tourer and drophead coupé were also listed and bare chassis were also supplied to outside coachbuilders. In 1930 on the home market the chassis sold for £410, the tourer £495, coupé £565 and saloon £535. With a 120-inch wheelbase and a total length of 173 inches, the car was, by the standards of the British market, larger and more spacious than the average family car such as the more mainstream Hillman Minx of that time, the Hillman business having been acquired by Humber in 1928. With the success of the Snipe, Humber was seen to be succeeding, "where many had failed, in marketing large cars at competitive prices".

There were several minor body updates for 1933 including windscreen wipers mounted below rather than above the screen, recessed direction indicators and two tone paint on the 4-light sports saloon. 1205 of the 1933 models were made.

In 1931, a fleet of Snipes was used by the Prince of Wales on his tour of the West Indies.

The body and chassis were shared with the smaller engined 16-50 (1930–32) and 16-60 (1933) models.

== 1936–1937 ==
In 1936, the wheelbase was increased by 4 inches (10 cm) to 124 inches (3.1 m), while the overall length of the standard-bodied car increased by 2 inches (5.1 cm). The chassis was new with independent front suspension using a transverse spring. A vacuum servo was fitted to the braking system. Body styles available were 4-light and 6-light saloons, a sports saloon and a drophead coupé. The car now featured a side-valve 6-cylinder engine of 4086 cc with a stated output of 100 hp which was later used in the post war Super Snipe. A top speed of 84 mph (135 km/h) was claimed.

2652 were made.

The same chassis and body range was used for the smaller engined Humber 18.

== 1938–1940 ==
Perhaps prompted by concern that the Snipe was outgrowing the wishes of the marketplace, the 1938 Snipe was the smallest-engined Snipe to date, with a wheelbase reduced to 114 in (2.9 m), but the total length was still 175 in (4.4 m), reflecting the more streamlined shape which the body, the same as on the Hillman 14, had now acquired. The six-cylinder side-valve engine of 3180 cc propelled the car to a claimed top speed of 79 mph (127 km/h), reflecting a power-output reduction to 75 hp (56 kW).

1938 changes for the 1939 models saw a new cross braced chassis and hydraulic brakes. The Snipe and its sister model become more firmly differentiated from one another, since the Humber Pullman continued to be offered with the older, more powerful 4086-cc engine.

2706 were made.

== 1940–1945 ==
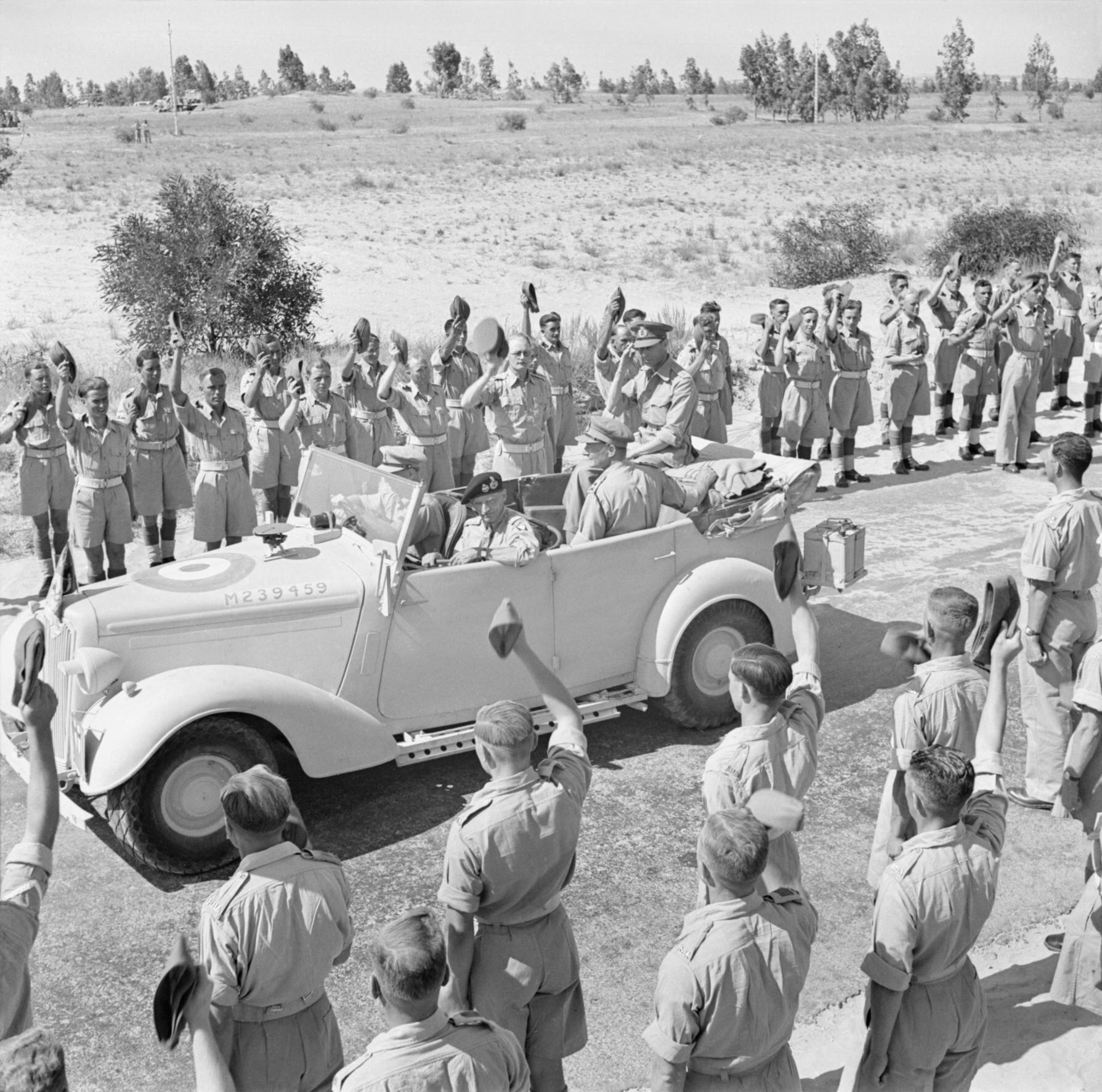
General Bernard Montgomery in his Super Snipe tourer with King George VI

Civilian availability ended in 1940 when the factory was largely given over to production of the Humber Light Reconnaissance Car, also known as the 'Ironside' or 'Humberette'.

Humber saloons based on pre-war designs continued to be built for government use. The militarised Super Snipe was given increased ground clearance, wider track (5 ft 1 inch at the front) and lower pressure 9x13 Dunlop tyres. For use in the desert an open tourer was built.

Humber produced the "heavy utiility" a 2 ton 7cwt 4x4 drive staff car comparable to the Ford WOT2. It used some Snipe components such as the 4-litre engine. It could operate at up to 63 mph (101 km/h) on roads in two wheel drive but change to lower gearing with four wheel drive and go cross-country at up to 40 miles per hour (64 km/h). As well as two staff officer body types it was built as an ambulance and a 8-cwt General Service (GS) truck. Around 6,500 were built up to 1945.

== 1945–1948 ==
Before the end of 1945, Humber had announced its post-war model range. Four models were listed, which closely resembled the Humbers offered just before the war. At the top of the range was the Humber Pullman. The other three models shared a body which, while smaller than that of the Pullman, nevertheless sustained the Humber tradition of offering a lot of car for the money. These were the four-cylinder Humber Hawk and the six-cylinder Humber Snipe and Humber Super Snipe.

The six-cylinder engine of the 1945 Snipe was a side-valve unit, of only 2731 cc. The engine block dated back to the Humber 18 of 1935. Maximum power output and speed were stated respectively as 65 hp and 72 mph (116 km/h). For customers who remembered the Snipe as a more powerful vehicle, the car could also be specified with the 4086-cc 100-hp engine which had been fitted in the 1930s and which was still the standard power unit in the 1945 Humber Pullman. Fitted with this engine, the car was branded as the Humber Super Snipe. When the Humber range was upgraded for 1948, the Snipe was withdrawn, leaving only the Hawk and the Super Snipe listed, alongside the larger Pullman.

1240 were made.

== Humber catalogue entry for 1930 ==
"Such Cars As Even Humber Never Built Before"

"New Season's Models & Prices"
Humber	"Snipe" Touring Car	£495
Humber	"Snipe" Six-Light Weymann Saloon	£535
Humber	"Snipe" Saloon	£535
Humber	"Snipe" Four-Door Weymann Coupé	£545
Humber	"Snipe" Drop-Head Coupé	£565
Humber	"Pullman" Landaulette	£775
Humber	"Pullman" Limousine	£775
Humber	Cabriolet de Ville	£1,095
	(Coachwork by Thrupp & Maberly)	
