= Humber Super Snipe =

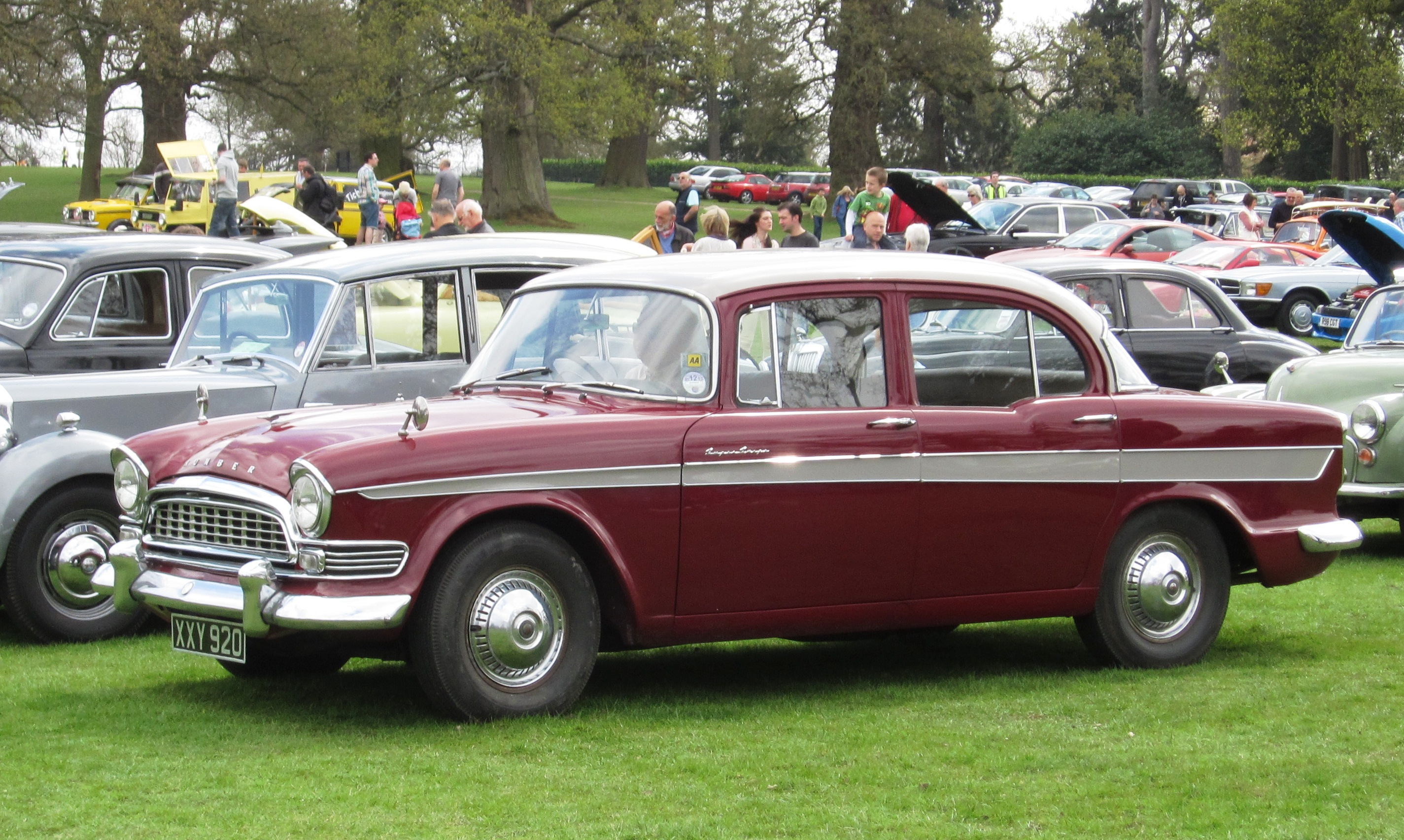
- Humber Super Snipe Series II

Overview
- Manufacturer: Humber (Rootes Group)
- Production: 1938–1967
- Assembly: United Kingdom; Australia; New Zealand

Body and chassis
- Related: Humber Hawk; Humber Snipe; Humber Pullman; Humber Imperial

The Humber Super Snipe is a car which was produced from 1938 to 1967 by British-based manufacturer Humber Limited.

== Pre-war Super Snipe ==
Humber Super Snipe
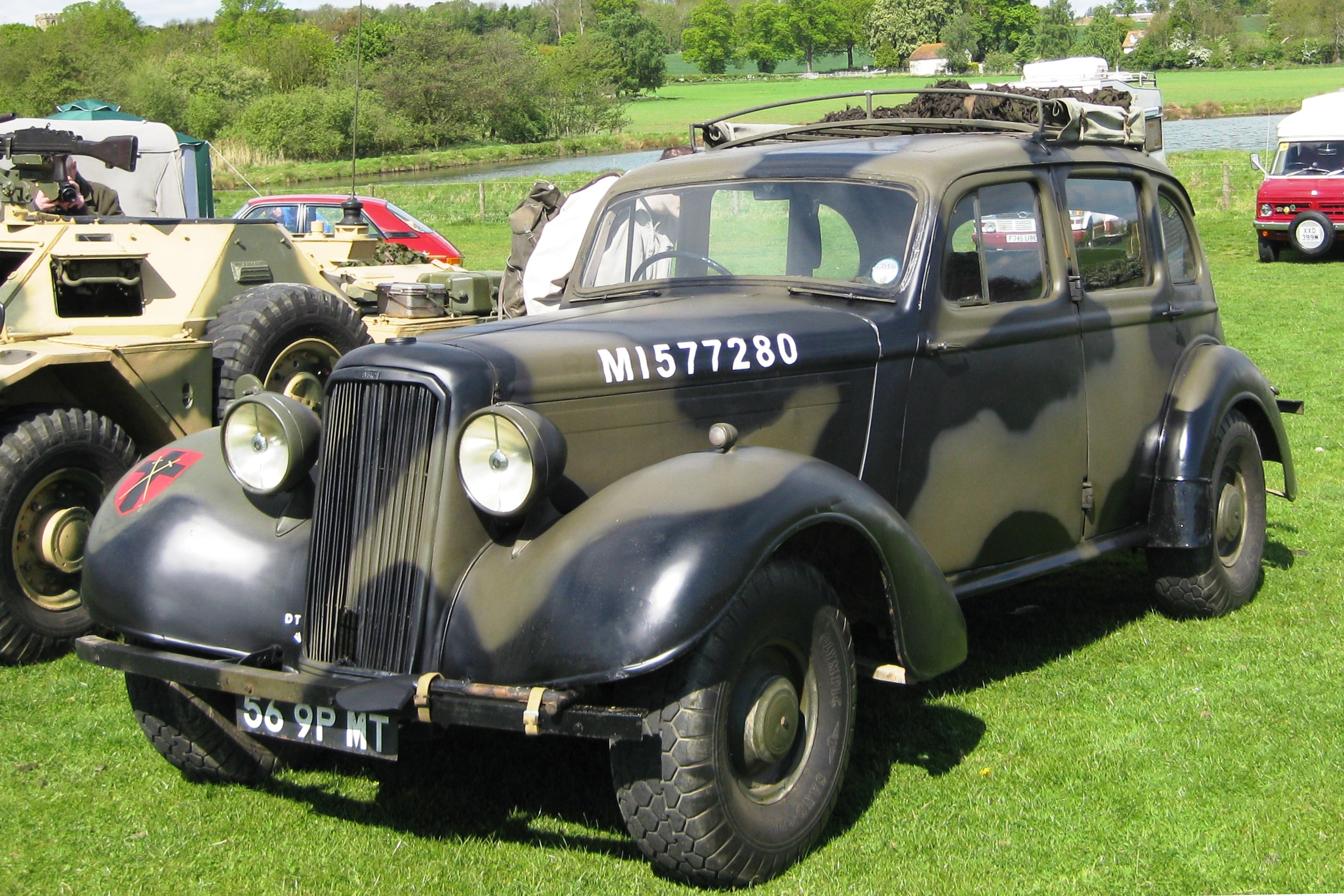
- 1939 Super Snipe in military livery

Overview
- Production: 1938–1940; 1500 (approx) made

Body and chassis
- Body style: 4-door saloon; Sports saloon; Drophead coupé

Powertrain
- Engine: 4086 cc Straight-6 side valve

Dimensions
- Wheelbase: 114 in (2,896 mm)
- Length: 175 in (4,445 mm)
- Width: 70 in (1,778 mm)

Chronology
- Predecessor: Humber Snipe

The Super Snipe was introduced in October 1938, derived by combining the four-litre inline six-cylinder engine from the larger Humber Pullman with the chassis and body of the Humber Snipe, normally powered by a three-litre engine. The result was a car of enhanced performance and a top speed of 79 mph (127 km/h) —fast for its day. Its design was contributed to by American engine genius Delmar "Barney" Roos who left a successful career at Studebaker to join Rootes in 1936.

The Super Snipe was marketed to upper-middle-class managers, professional people and government officials. It was relatively low-priced for its large size and performance, and was similar to American cars in appearance and concept, and in providing value for money.

Within a year of introduction, World War II broke out in Europe but the car continued in production as a British military staff car, designated Car, 4-seater, 4x2, while the same chassis was used for an armoured reconnaissance vehicle, the Humber Light Reconnaissance Car.

=== Military operators ===
- United Kingdom: British Army, Royal Navy, RAF

== Super Snipe Mark I to III ==
Humber Super Snipe Mark I–III
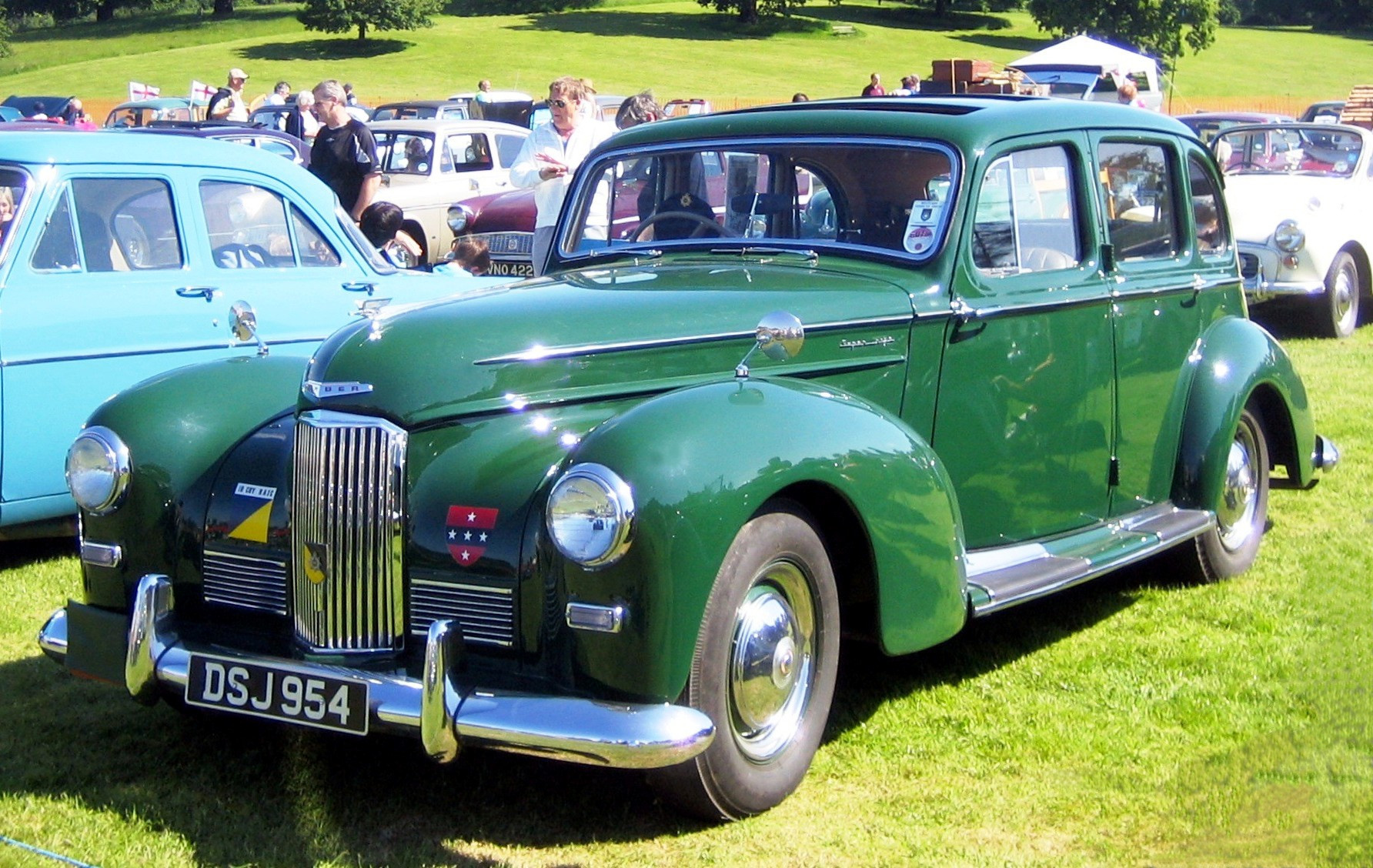
- Humber Super Snipe 1951 ex military

Overview
- Production: 1945–1952 production 3909 (Mk I); 8,361 (Mk II) 8,703 (Mk III)

Body and chassis
- Body style: 4-door saloon; Drophead coupé; Estate car

Powertrain
- Engine: 4086 cc Straight-6 side valve (I to III)

Dimensions
- Wheelbase: 114 in (2,896 mm) (I); 117 in (2,972 mm) (I to III)
- Length: 180 in (4,572 mm) (I); 187 in (4,750 mm) (II); 191 in (4,851 mm) (III)
- Width: 69 in (1,753 mm) (I); 74 in (1,880 mm) (II & III)

In 1946, post-war civilian production resumed and the Super Snipe evolved through several versions, each designated by a Mark number, each generally larger, more powerful, and more modern, until production ended in 1957 with the Mark IVB version.

=== Mk I ===
The Mark I was essentially a 6-cylinder version of the 1945 Humber Hawk, itself a facelifted pre-war car. A version of the 1930s Snipe remained available, with the 1936-introduced 2731 cc engine. However, the standard Super Snipe engine was the 4086cc side-valve engine that had appeared in the Humber Pullman nearly a decade earlier, in 1936, and which would continue to power post-war Super Snipes until 1952. Throughout the years 1936–1952 the maximum power output of the engine was always given by the manufacturer as 100 bhp at 3400 rpm.

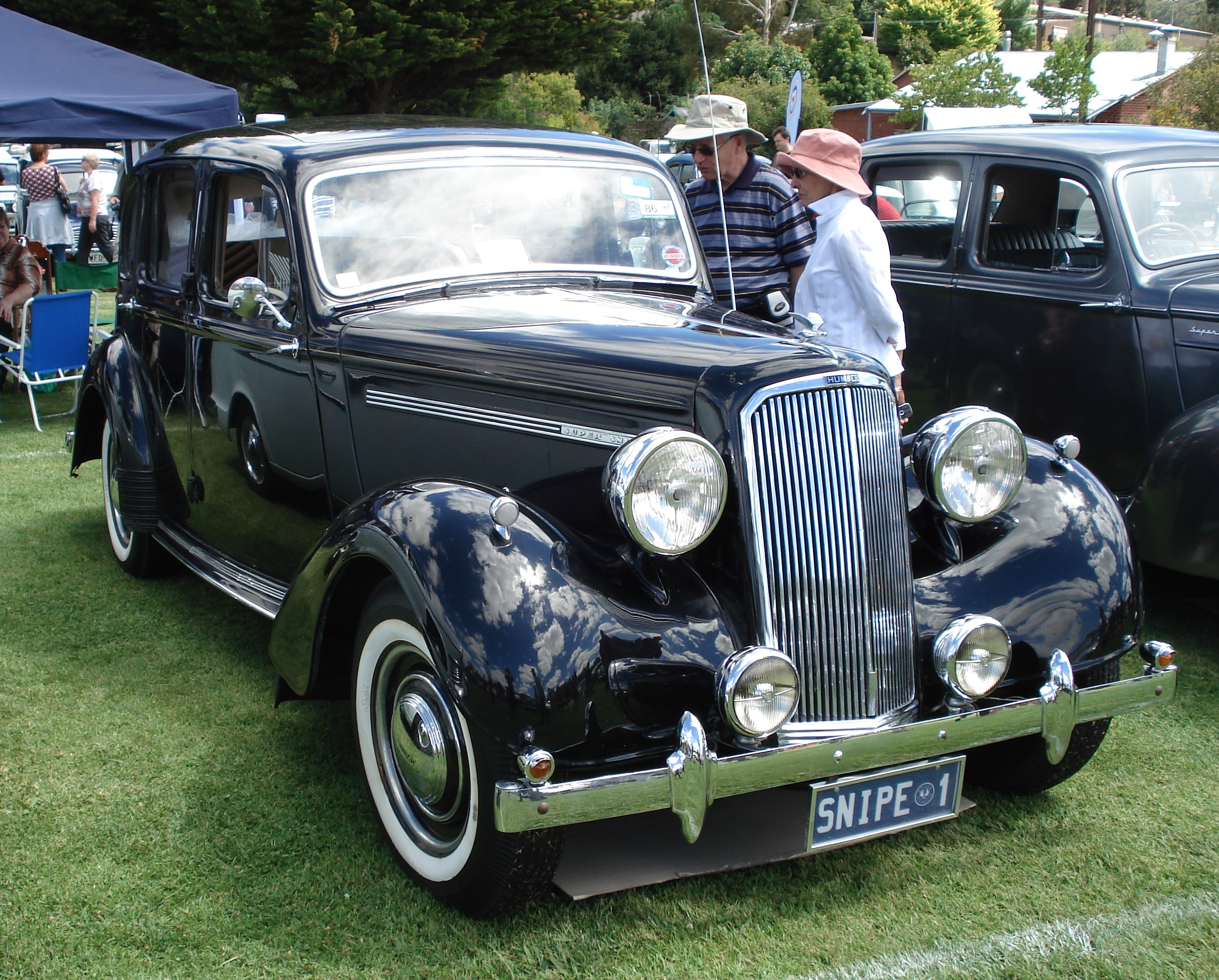
Humber Super Snipe Mark I (1946)

=== Mk II ===
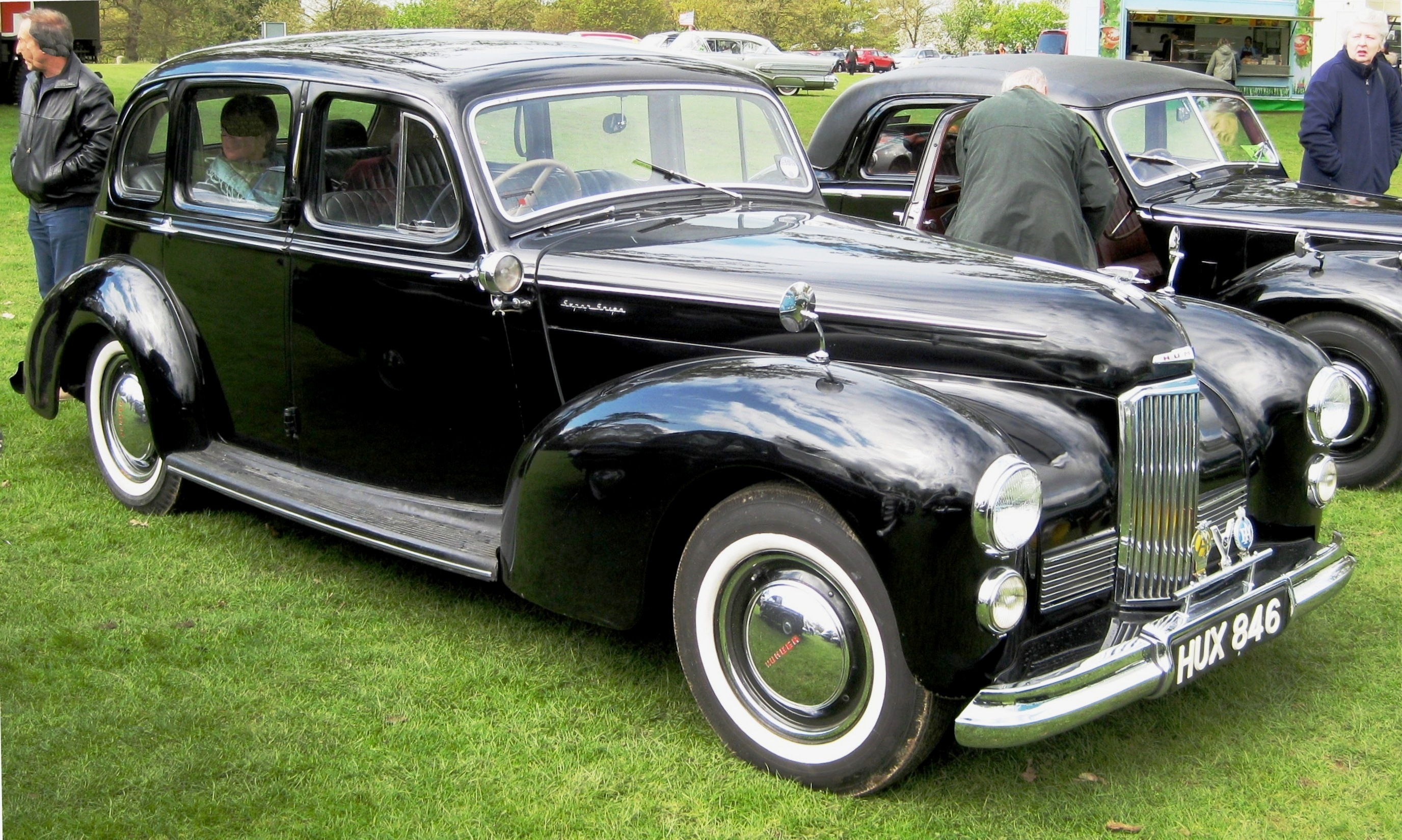
early Humber Super Snipe Mark II 1949

The Mark II announced in mid-September 1948 was mostly redesigned in chassis and body. Now a full six-seater with a bench-type front seat it was given a wider track and a variable ratio steering unit. The gear lever was now mounted on the steering column. Like Humber's Pullman the headlights were fitted into the wings and running-boards were re-introduced. The transverse-spring independent suspension, first introduced on the Snipe and Pullman in 1935, continued but with 14 leaves instead of eight.

The smaller-engined Snipe was discontinued. Early Mark II Super Snipes can be distinguished by round lamps below the head lamps. The left one was a fog lamp, and the right one was a "pass" lamp with a low narrow beam for passing cars when using dipped headlights. These were dropped in 1949 in favour of rectangular side lamps which were continued in the Mark III.

The Times motoring correspondent tested the new car at the end of 1948. The spare wheel was criticized as being difficult to extract and the indirect gears were, he thought, not as quiet as they might be. Overall the finish reflected the excellent taste that distinguished Rootes Group products

125 drophead coupés were made by Tickford in 1949 and 1950.

1949 drophead coupé by Tickford
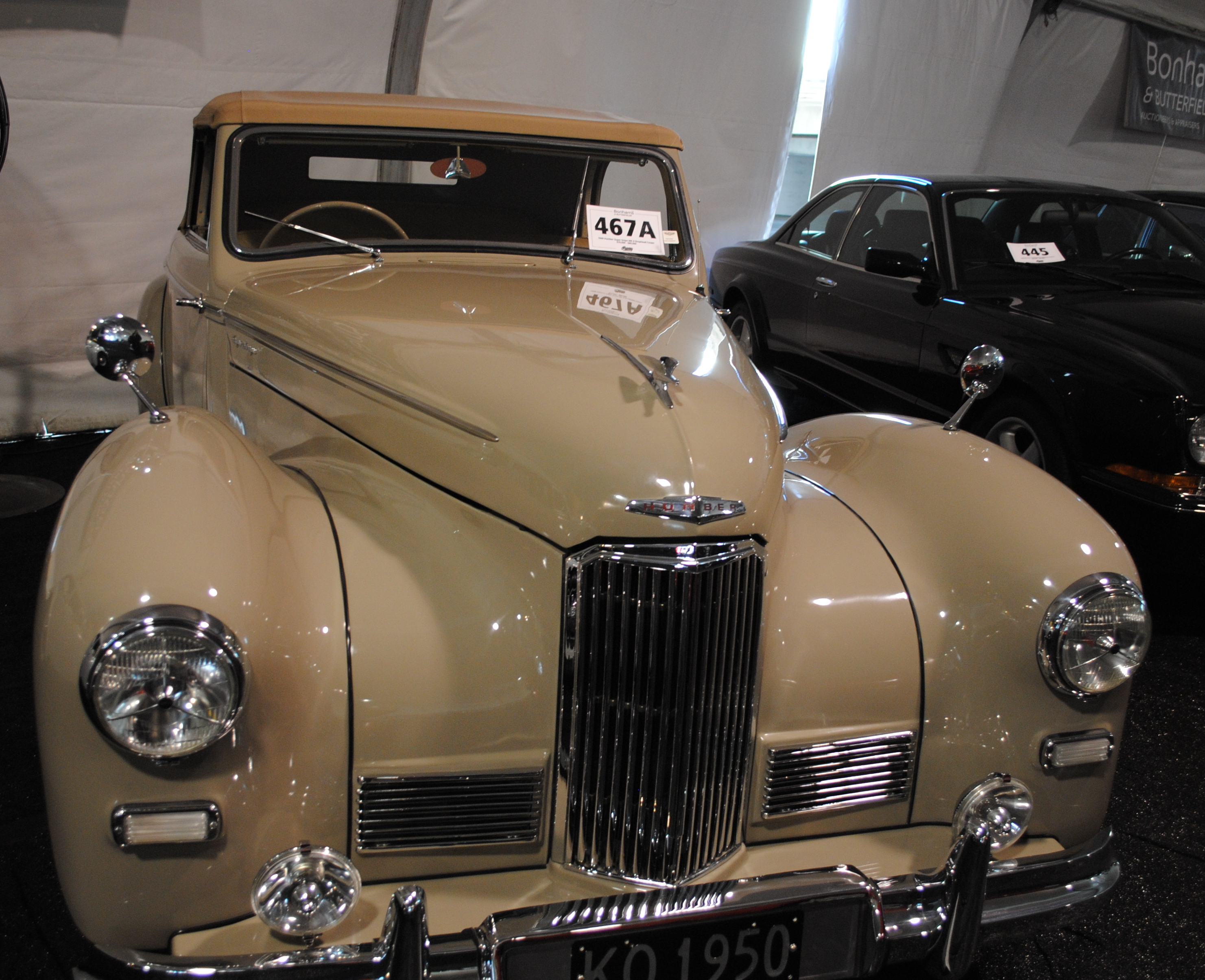

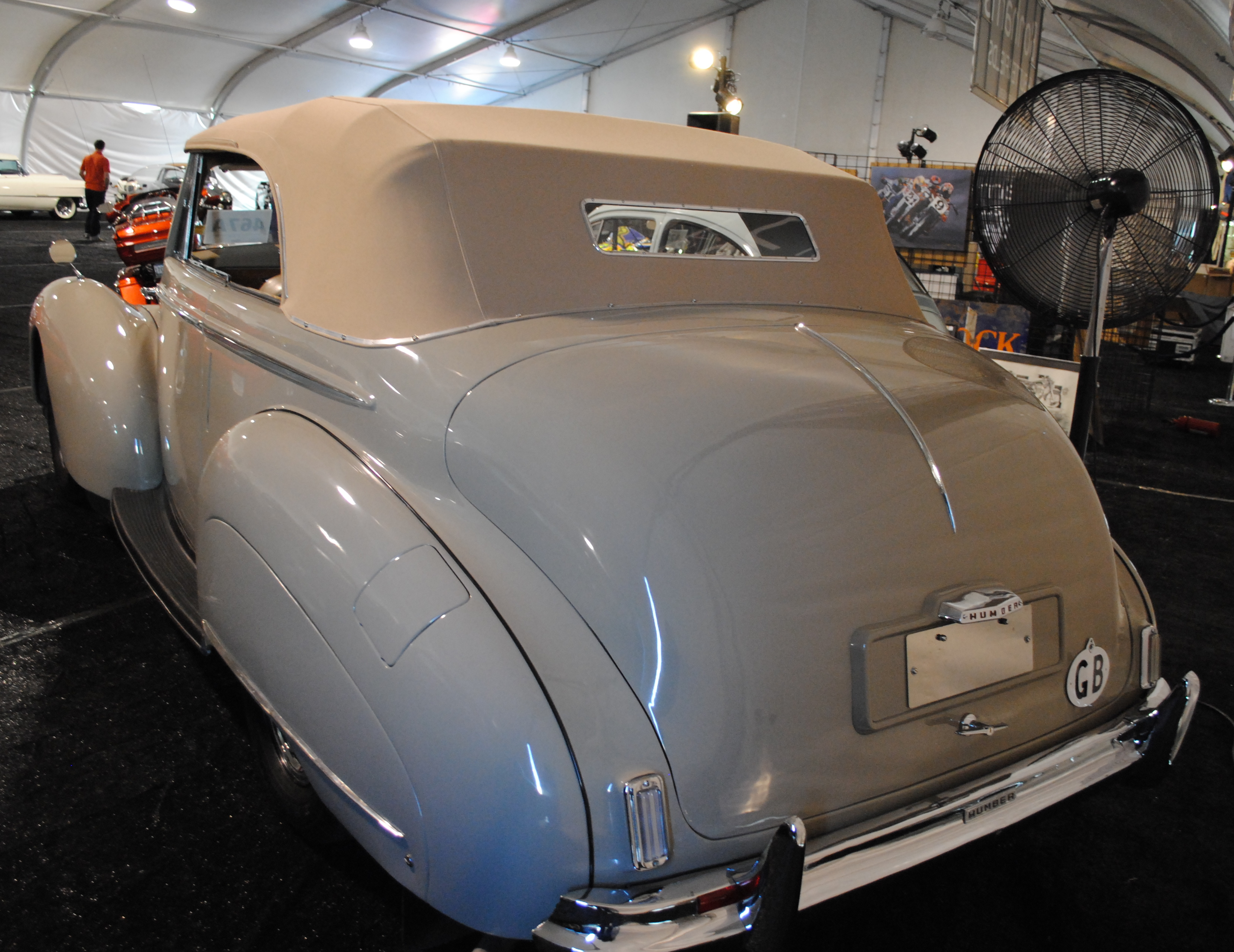

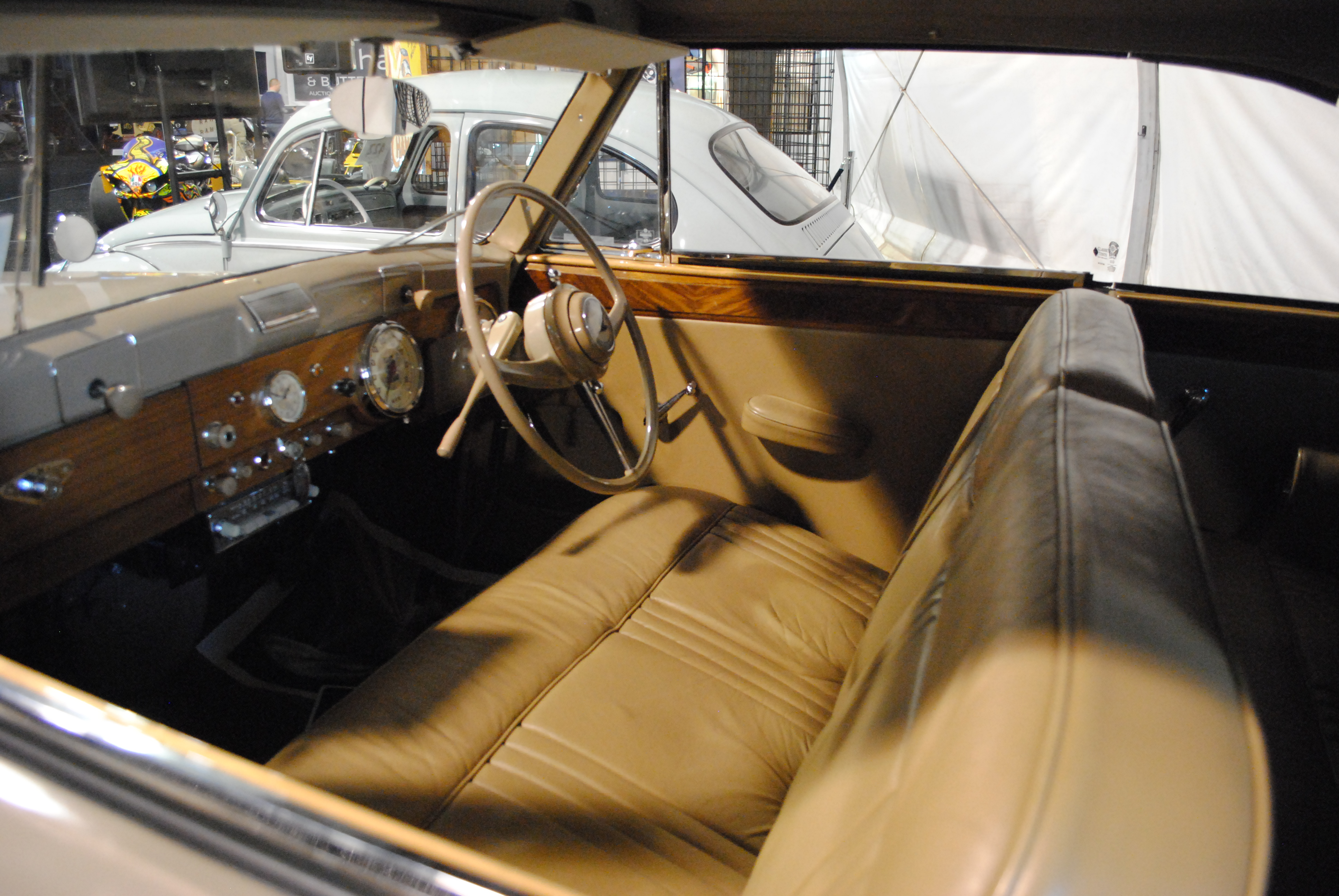

=== Mk III ===
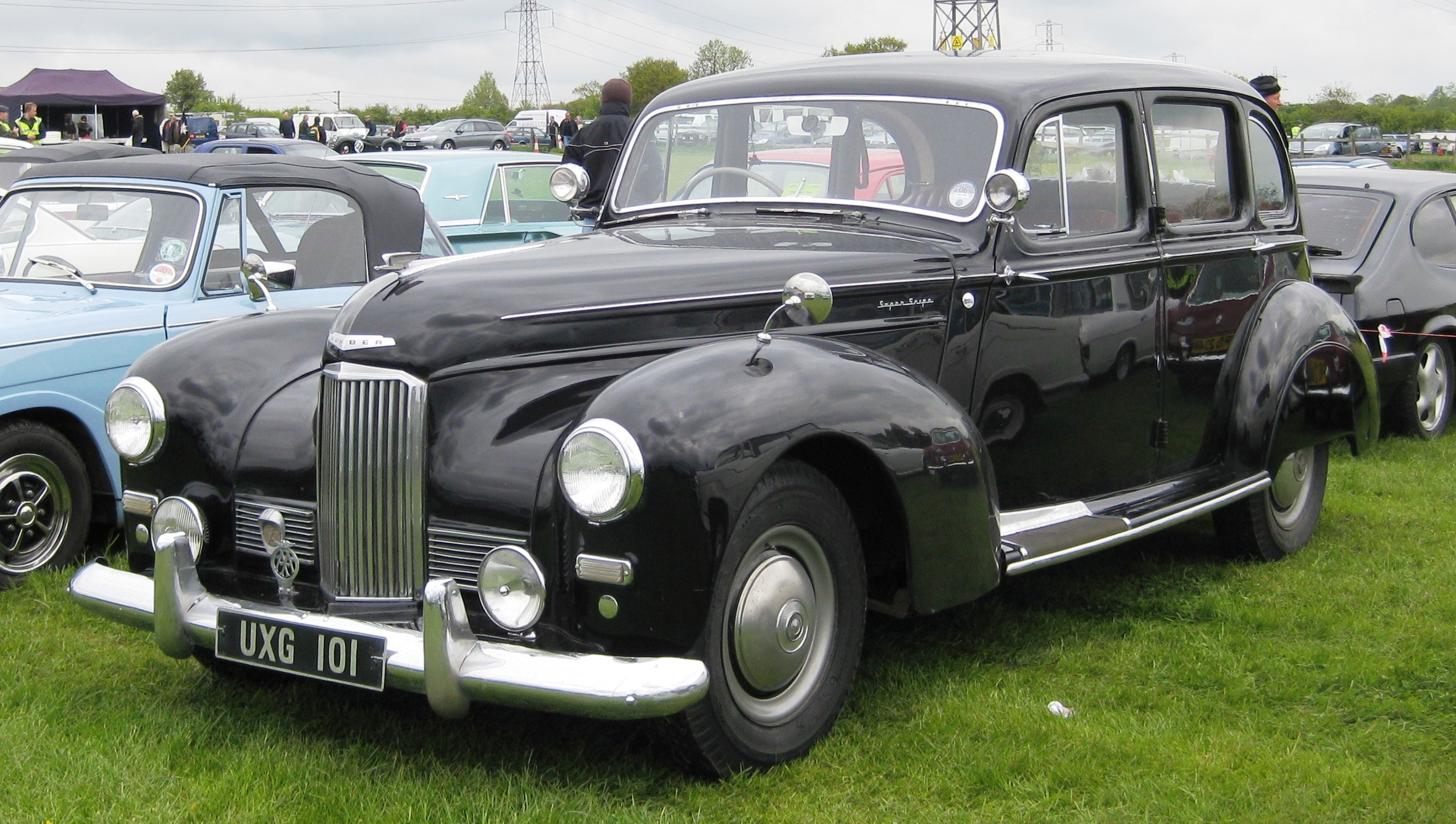
Humber Super Snipe Mark III 1952

The Mk III followed in August 1950. Easily identifiable by spats over the rear wheels it had a Panhard rod added to the rear suspension which limited sideways movement of the rear wheels and so permitted the use of softer springs. The 1950 car can be readily distinguished from the previous model by the simpler dome-shaped bumpers and the rectangular stainless-steel foot-treads on the running-boards.

A Mk III tested by The Motor magazine in 1951 had a top speed of 81.6 mph (131.3 km/h) and could accelerate from 0-60 mph (97 km/h) in 19.1 seconds. A fuel consumption of 17.7 miles per imperial gallon (16.0 L/100 km; 14.7 mpg_{‑US}) was recorded. The test car cost £1,471 including taxes.

== Mk IV ==
Humber Super Snipe Mark IV
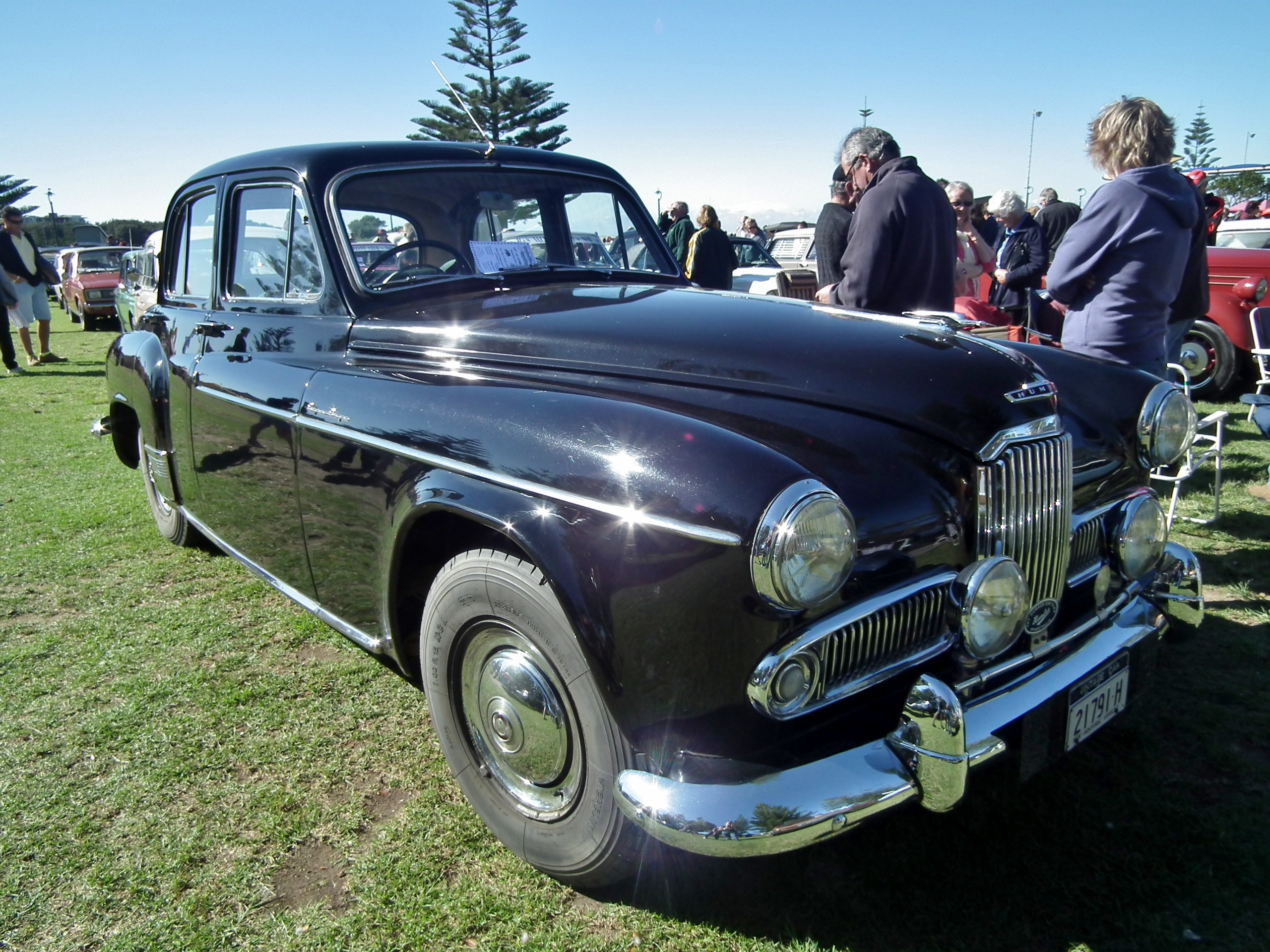
- 1955 example

Overview
- Production: 1952–1958 production 17,993 (IV)

Body and chassis
- Body style: 4-door saloon and pick-up

Powertrain
- Engine: 4138 cc Straight-6 ohv
- Transmission: 4-speed manual

Dimensions
- Wheelbase: 116 in (2,946 mm)
- Length: 197 in (5,004 mm)
- Width: 71 in (1,803 mm)
- Height: 54 in (1,400 mm)

The all-new Mark IV Super Snipe announced mid-October 1952, Earls Court Motor Show time, used a Hawk Mk IV body shell lengthened by 6 in (152 mm) but with a 4138 cc 113 bhp (84 kW) overhead-valve engine, also used in a Rootes Group Commer truck. Chassis and suspension components were uprated to take the greater weight and power of the Super Snipe, those parts ceasing to be interchangeable with those of the Hawk. From 1955, overdrive was available as an option, followed by an automatic gearbox in 1956.

Shortly after the car's announcement, Leslie Johnson, Stirling Moss, and two Rootes Group staff, drove a new silver-grey Super Snipe from Oslo to Lisbon, travelling through fifteen European countries in 3 days, 17 hours and 59 minutes. The run demonstrated the car's high-speed reliability in far from ideal conditions.

In 1953 The Motor tested a Mk IV and found the larger engine had increased performance with the top speed now 91 mph (146 km/h) and acceleration from 0-60 mph (97 km/h) in 14.7 seconds. Fuel consumption had increased to 15.5 miles per imperial gallon (18.2 L/100 km; 12.9 mpg_{‑US}). The test car cost slightly more at £1,481, including taxes.

The Automatic Mk IV saloon tested by The Motor in 1956 Ref. 21/56 Continental, recorded a maximum speed of 97.0 mph (mean) and 98.9 mph (best). 0–60 mph acceleration was 14.8 sec, with a 0–90 in 38.2 sec, The Standing Quarter Mile was 20.4 sec. The axle ratio was 3.7:1 and maximum bhp 122 on a 7.13:1 compression ratio, as stated in the data panel of this road test.

In 1957 The Times commented that the car was handsome if somewhat dated. It attracted favourable attention from passers-by and gave its occupants a satisfying sense of solidity and respectability. The two separate front seats were described as "enormous" and it was noted their backs could be reclined to the horizontal for a passenger to sleep. The steering was described as generally imprecise, uncomfortably low-geared for parking, and in need of power assistance. The car represented "remarkably fine" value for money.

Rootes also produced a pick-up version of the Mk IV for export which utilised the same 4138cc six-cylinder 'Blue Riband' engine. It marketed the pick-up as a vehicle whose nature 'would be appreciated on farms, plantations, airports, ranches, oil fields and development schemes, particularly in countries where the going is rough'.

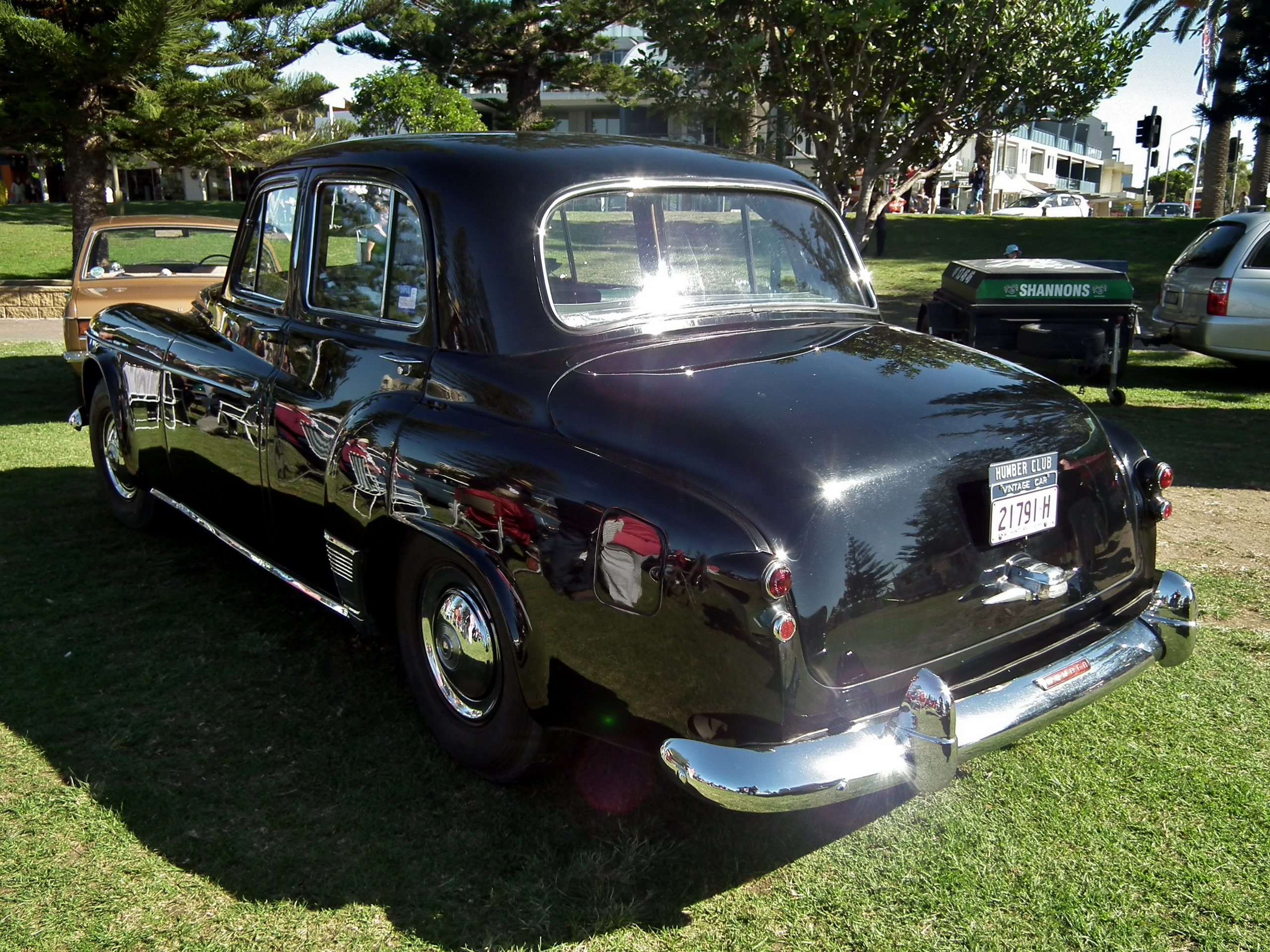

== New Super Snipe Series I to V ==
Humber Super Snipe Series I–V
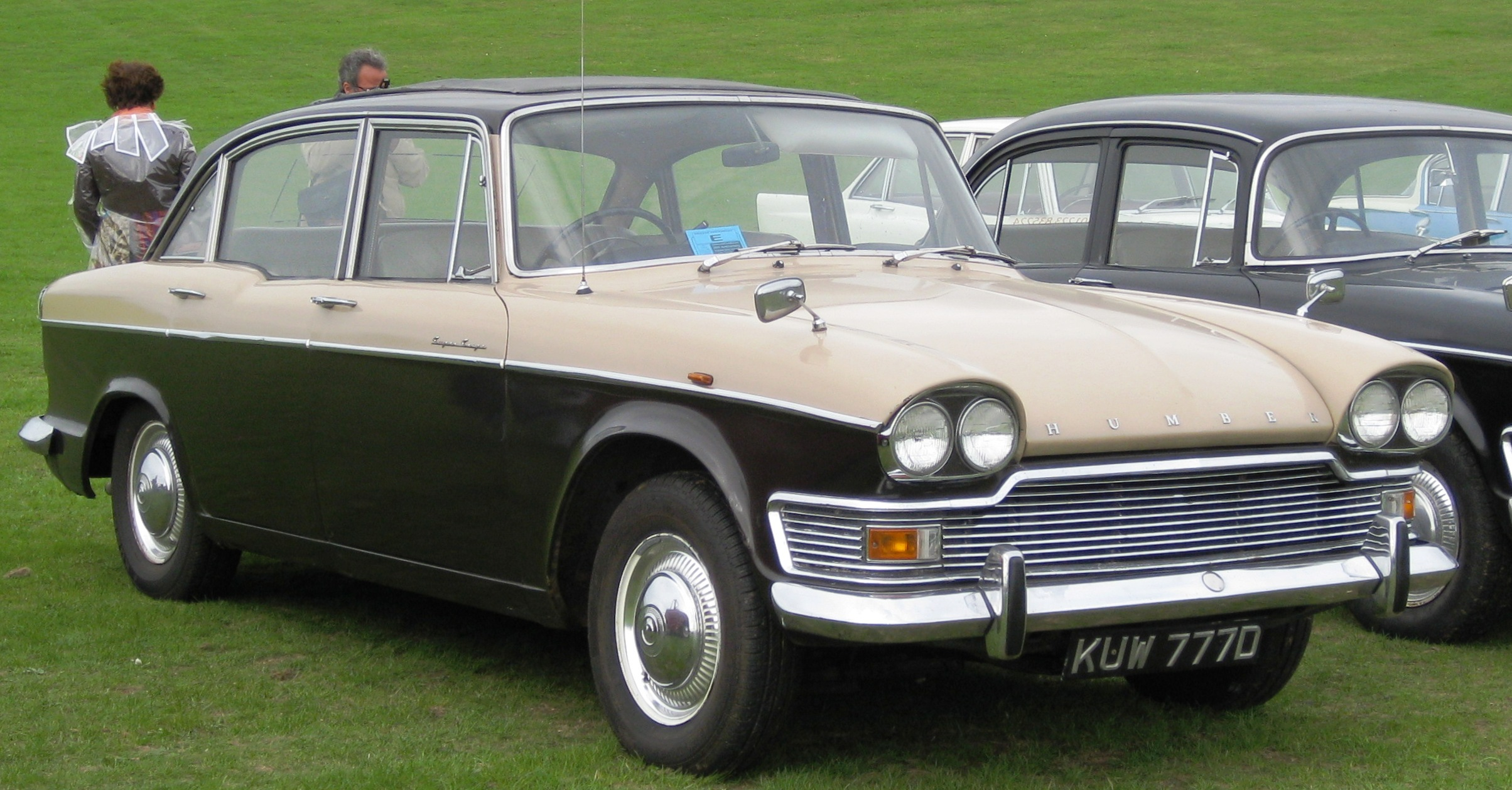
- Series V registered July 1966

Overview
- Production: 1958–1967: production 6,072 (I); 7,175 (II); 7,257 (III); 6,495 (IV); 3,032 (V)

Body and chassis
- Body style: 4-door saloon; Estate car; Limousine

Powertrain
- Engine: 2651 cc Straight-6 ohv (I); 2965 cc ohv (II-V)
- Transmission: 3 speed manual; Overdrive and automatic optional

Dimensions
- Wheelbase: 110 in (2,794 mm)
- Length: 185 in (4,699 mm); (I & II) 188 in (4,775 mm) (III to V)
- Width: 69.5 in (1,765 mm); 70.5 in (1,791 mm)
- Height: 62 in (1,575 mm)
- Kerb weight: 3,584 lb (1,625 kg) (S. III Estate)

=== Series I ===
In October 1958, a new Super Snipe was introduced and first presented to the public at the opening of the Paris Salon de l'Automobile. Confusingly, the designation returned to the Super Snipe I, but this time the variants were identified by a series number. The new car was based on the unitized chassis and body of the four-cylinder Humber Hawk, but with a new 2.6 litre, 2,651 cc, six-cylinder overhead-valve engine based on an Armstrong Siddeley design with bore and stroke of 82.55 millimetres (3.250 in) and near-hemispherical combustion chambers producing 112 bhp at 5000 rpm.

This engine was matched to a three-speed manual transmission with optional Laycock de Normanville overdrive on second and top gears, or Borg Warner DG automatic transmission. Power steering was available as an option. Also offered was a touring limousine model with glass partition.

The new car was smaller on the outside, but larger on the inside, with improved performance and the appearance of a reduced size 1955 Chevrolet 4-door sedan.

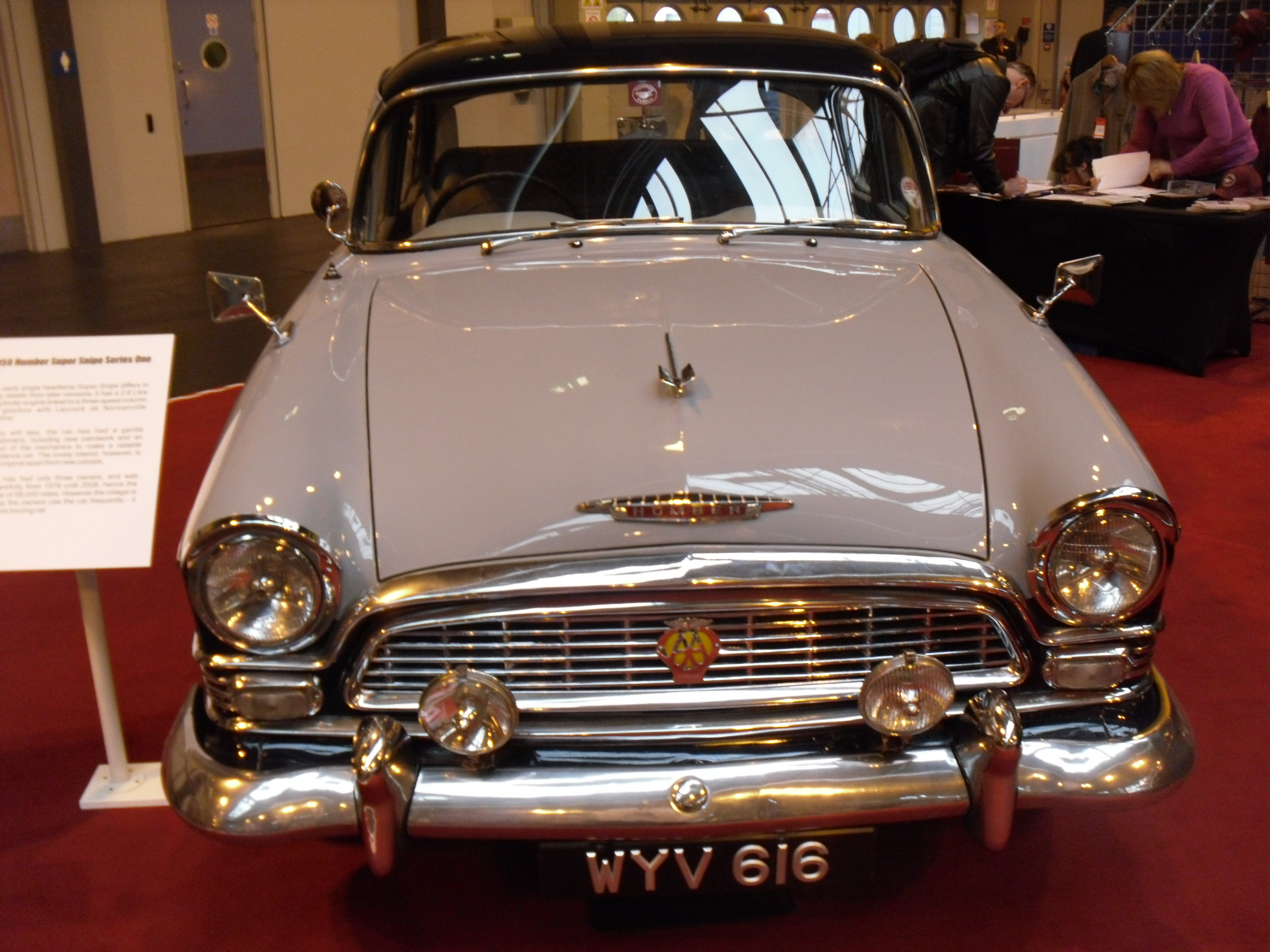
Series I front

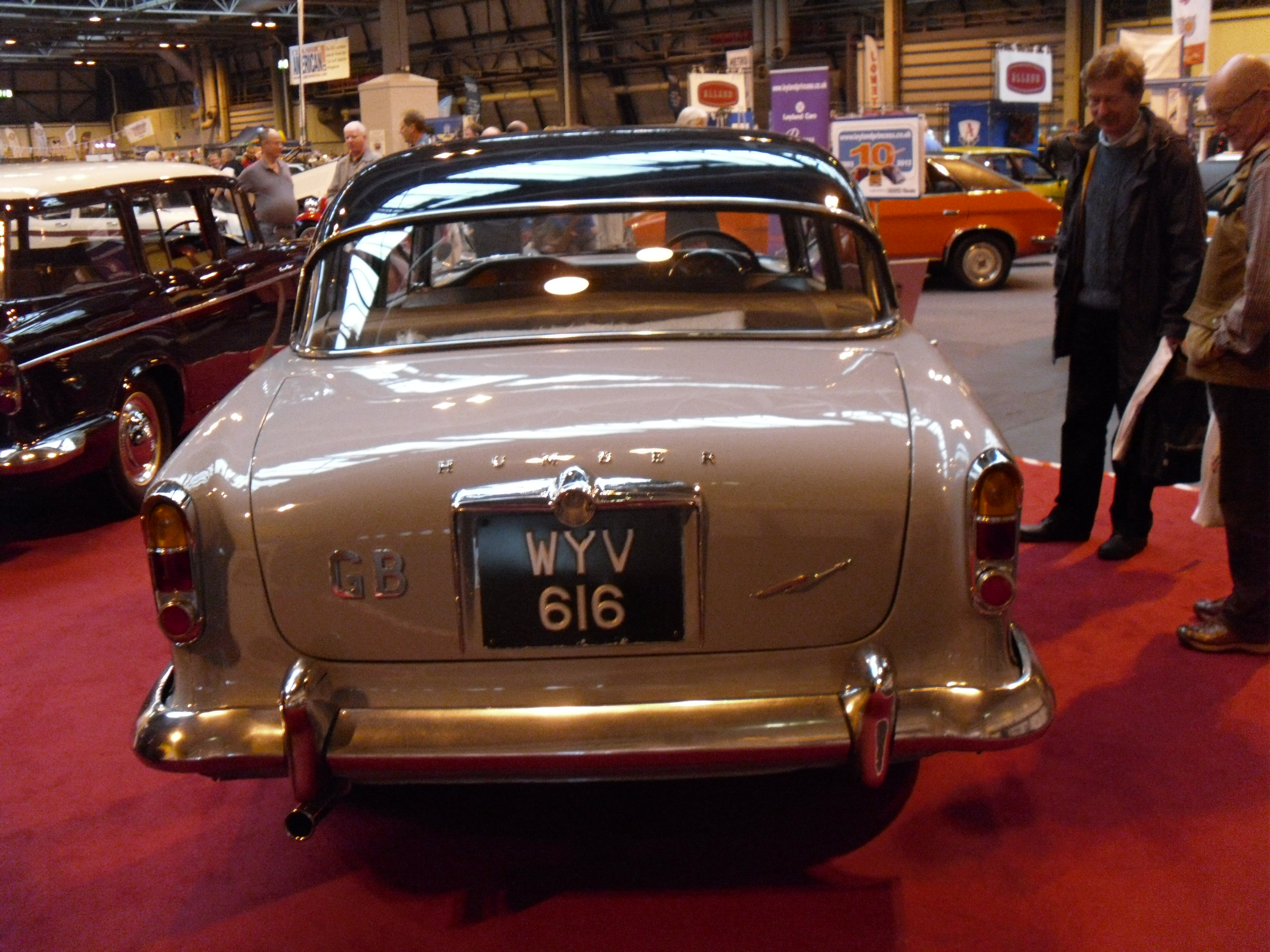
Series I rear

=== Series II ===
In October 1959 the Series II entered production with its engine enlarged to 3 litres, 2,965 cc, by increasing the bore to 87.2 mm (3.4 in). A new Zenith carburettor was fitted and the engine's output was raised to 129 bhp at 4800 rpm. A new eight-bladed fan improved engine cooling. Girling 11.5 in (292 mm) disc brakes were introduced on the front wheels with 11 in (279 mm) drums on the rear axle. A stiffer anti-roll bar was fitted to the front suspension.

A Series II with overdrive and power steering was tested by The Motor in 1960 and had a top speed of 94.7 mph (152.4 km/h) and could accelerate from 0-60 mph (97 km/h) in 16.5 seconds. A fuel consumption of 24.6 miles per imperial gallon (11.5 L/100 km; 20.5 mpg_{‑US}) was recorded. The test car cost £1,601 including taxes. The basic car cost £1453.

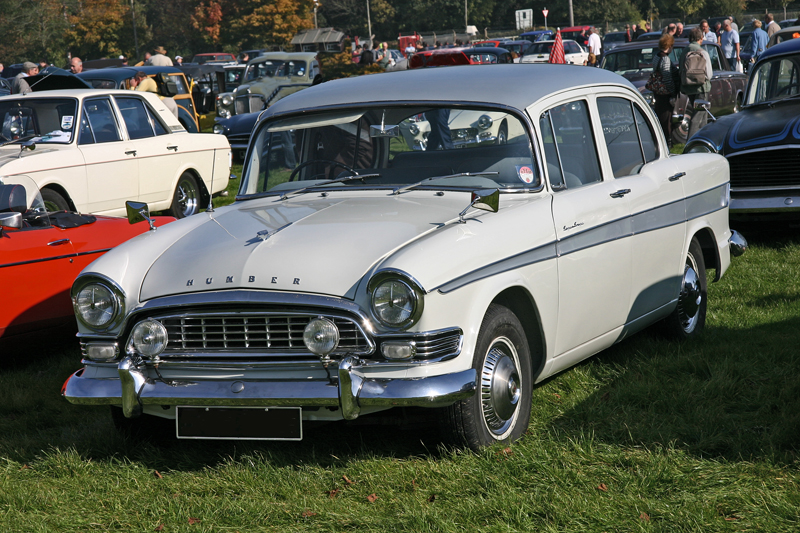
Series II front

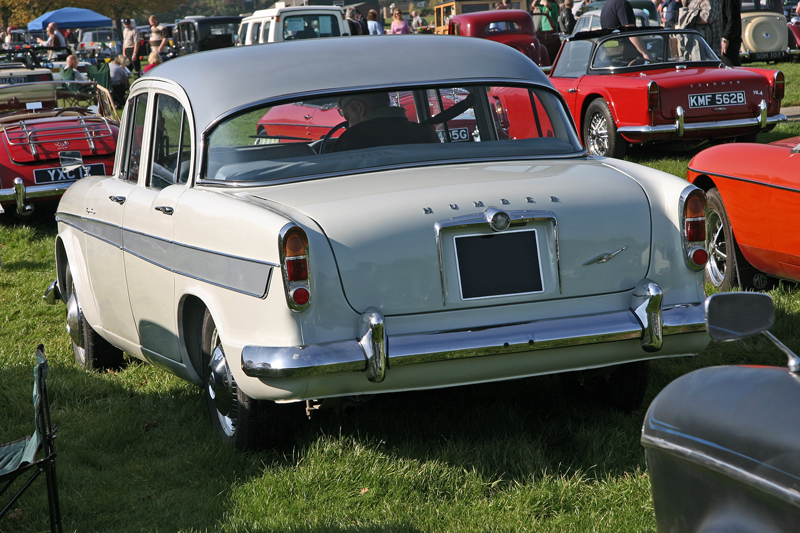
Series II rear

=== Series III ===
The styling of the Series III which the Rootes Group announced in October 1960 was distinguishable by its four headlights and revised full-width grille. This Snipe was the first British car to fit two pairs of headlamps. The suspension of the car had been considerably modified along with the car's floor structure which improved the car's high speed stability. The front of the car was redesigned to give a lower bonnet line. The nose of the car was also lengthened by 3.25 inches (83 mm) to accommodate an additional pulley, mounted on the front of the crankshaft, that enabled air conditioning to be included as an option, principally for the North American market. Separate ducts were provided for heating and cooling air to the passenger compartment. The engine received improved bearings with a changed lubrication system and was given better cooling with a quieter fan. Seats were redesigned to give more leg space for back seat passengers.

When tested by The Times, complaints focused on a perceived need for more logical grouping of instruments, a horn ring obstructing the driver's view of the instruments and an over-bright white choke warning light. The power steering seemed to lack "feel". In direct top gear a speed of 95 mph was obtained, less if overdrive had been engaged.

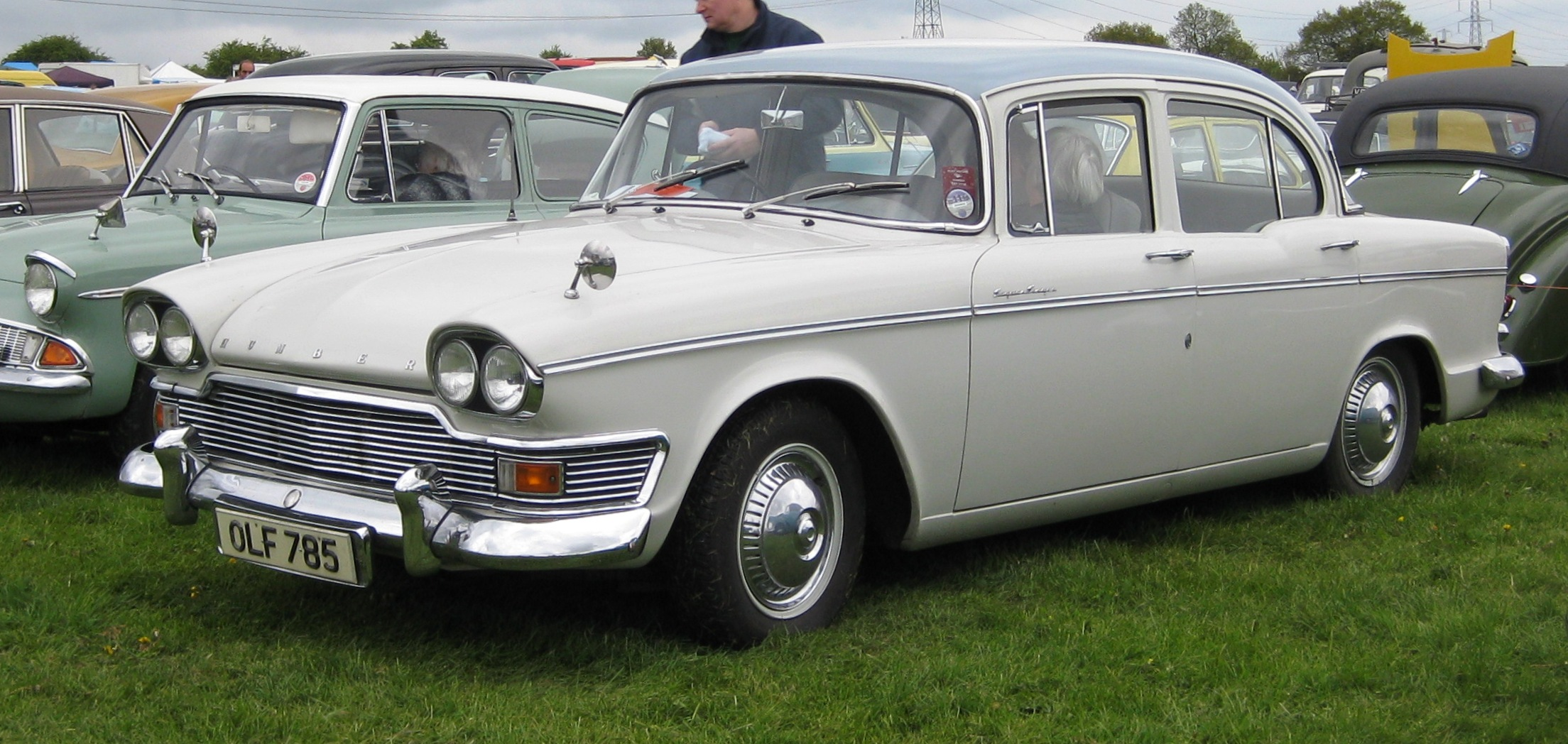
Series III four headlights, longer nose, wider grille

=== Series IV ===
For the October 1962 Motor Show there were minor improvements. The rear window was changed to give the roof line an improved appearance and now more nearly match the original 1955 Chevrolet shape. Engine output was now rated at 132.5 bhp (99 kW) bhp and the rear axle had been given a higher gear ratio. Manual gearbox cars received a new type of diaphragm clutch made by Borg and Beck and the petrol tank was enlarged from 12.5 to 16 gallons capacity. It can be distinguished by its revised rear-window treatment (doesn't wrap around quite as much as earlier models), Snipe bird badge on grille, opening quarter-light windows in the rear doors, and other trim differences.

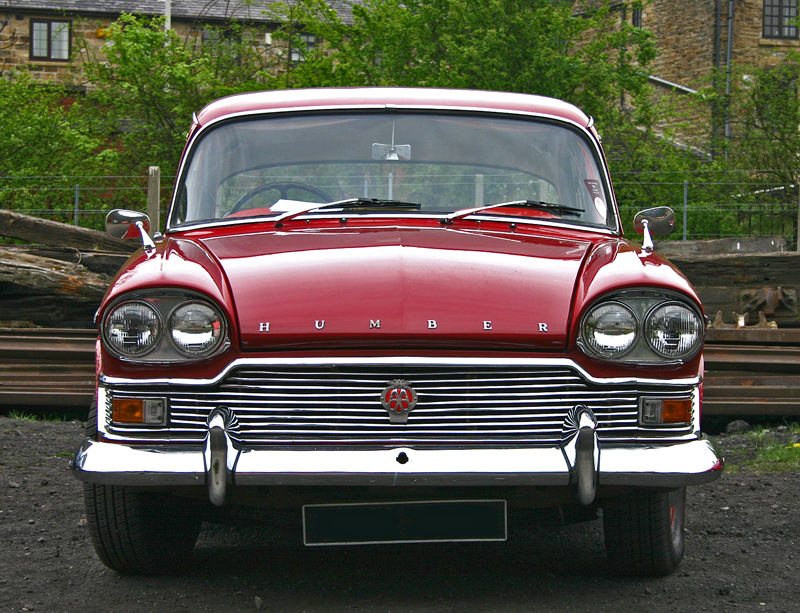
Series IV front

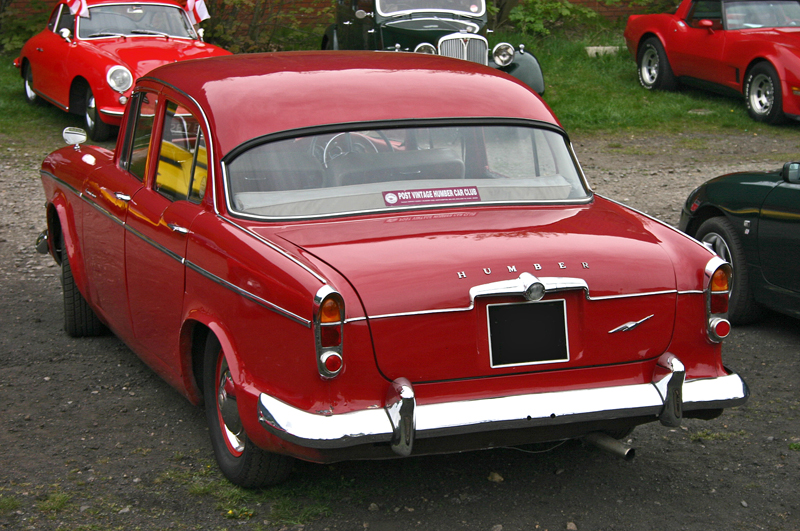
Series IV rear

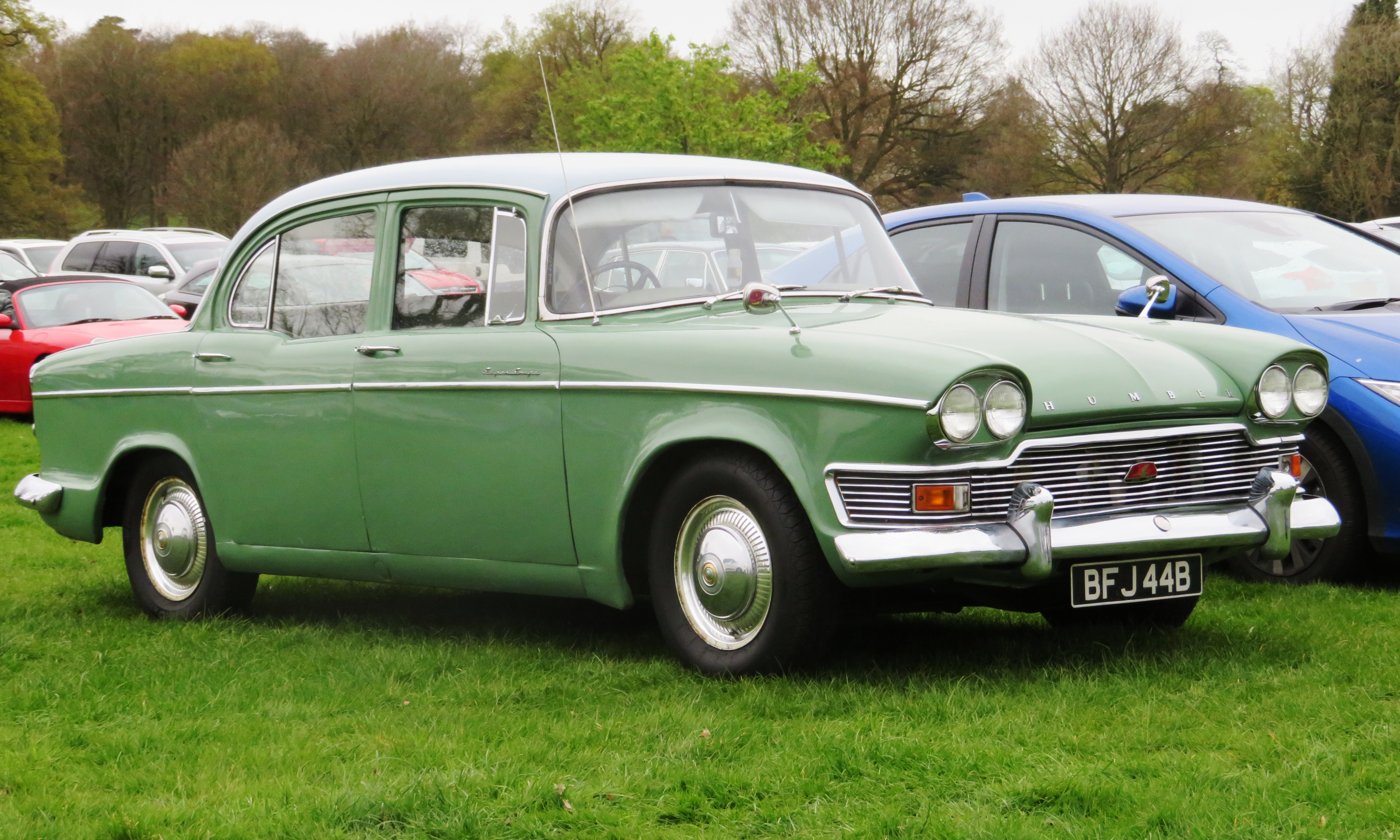
Series IV side

=== Series V and Va ===
In October 1964 the final Series V version of the Saloon saw an upper body restyle, (also applied to the Hawk Saloon and the Rootes Group's smaller Hillman Super Minx and its derivatives) with a flat roofline and rear window, six-light side windows and a larger, taller windscreen. The Estate body in both marques remained unchanged. Twin Zenith Stromberg 175CD carburettors were fitted along with a Harry Weslake tuned cylinder head, increasing the power to 137.5 bhp (102.5 kW), and synchromesh was fitted to all ratios in the gearbox—on the previous versions it had only been on the upper two. Major modifications were made to front and rear suspensions and they required less maintenance. Sound insulation was further improved.

Hydrosteer power steering was available as an optional extra, as was an automatic transmission (Borg Warner Type 35 on Series Va), and metallic paint finishes.

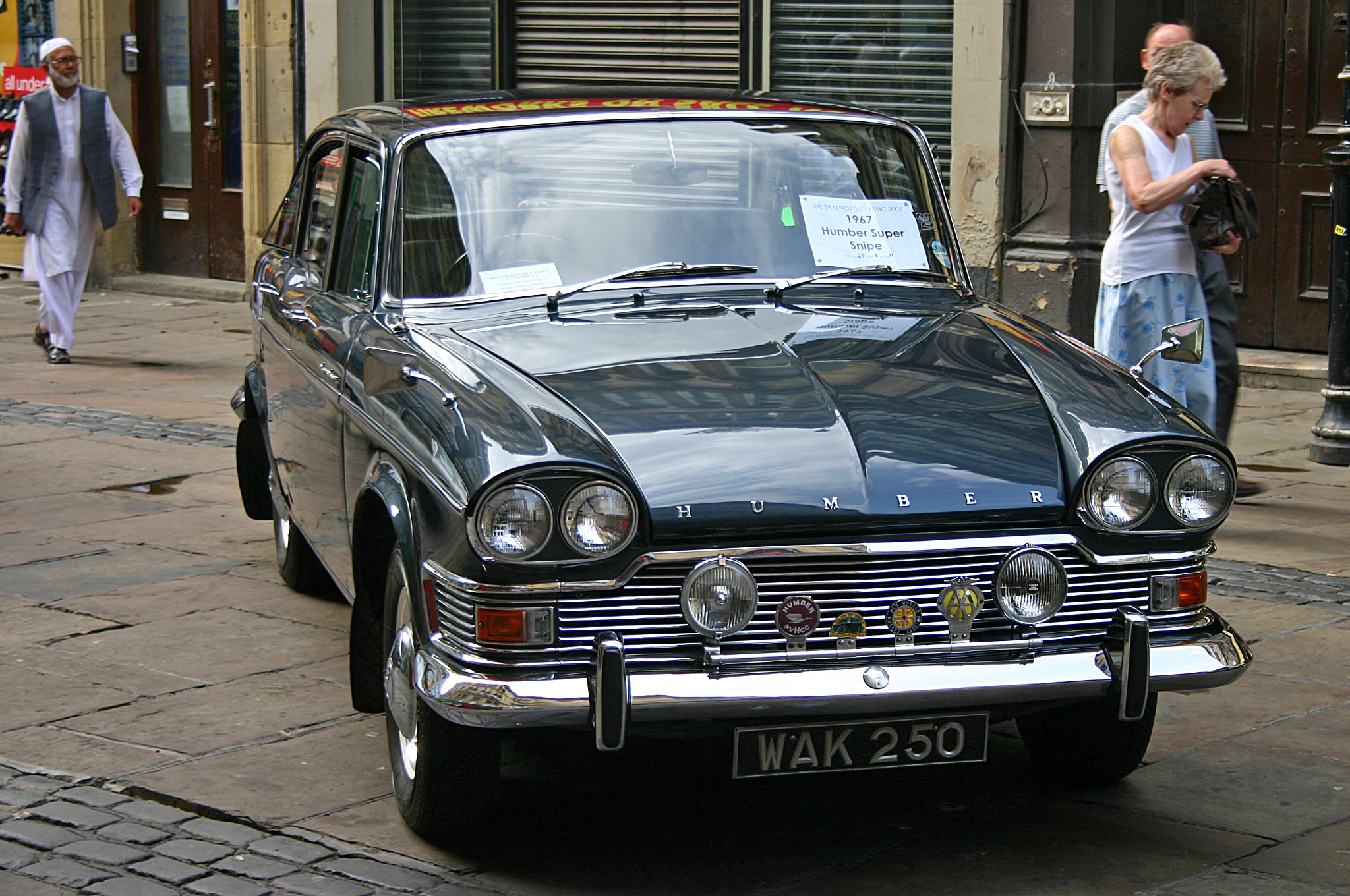
Larger windscreen for Series V Saloon

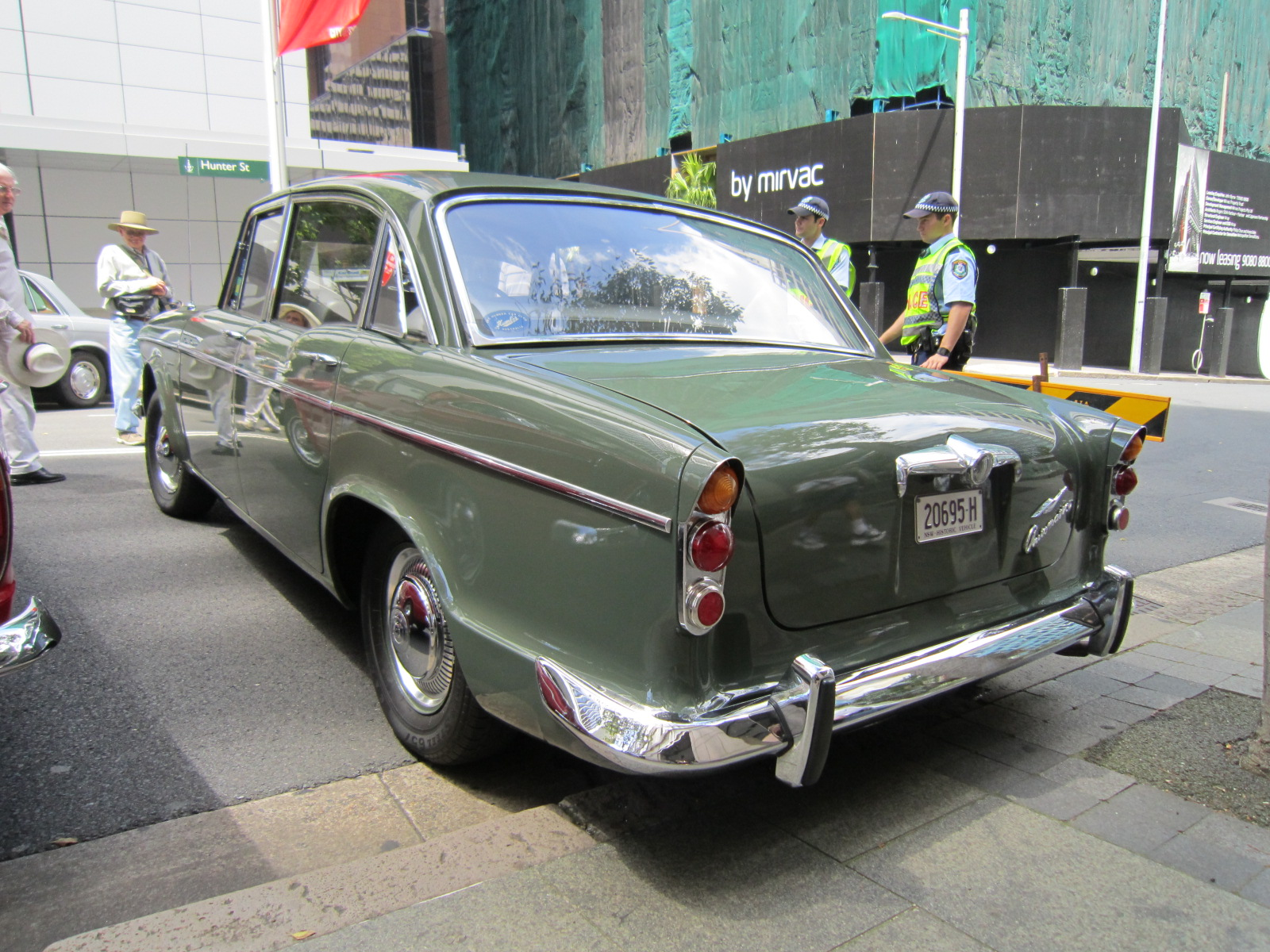
Series V Saloon

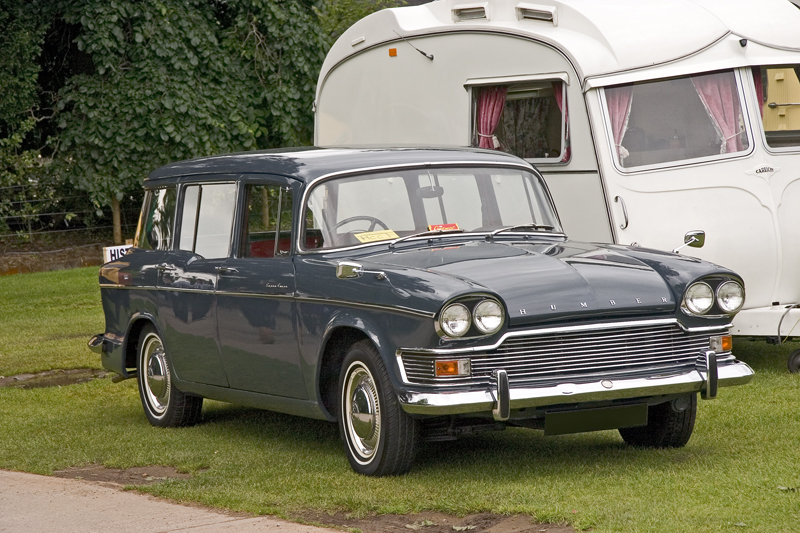
Older windscreen for Series V Estate Car

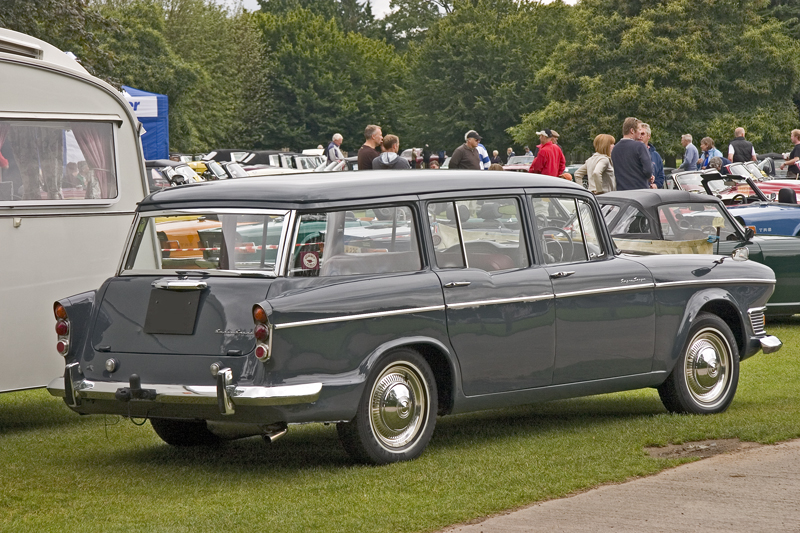
Split tailgate for Series V Estate Car

=== Humber Imperial ===
The Humber Imperial was introduced in late 1964. Intended to match BMC's Rolls-Royce engined Vanden Plas Princess 4-litre R the Imperial shared the basic specification and performance of the Super Snipe with the addition of a vinyl roof, fully reclining front seats, automatic transmission and hydrosteer power steering as standard. However, a manual 3-speed transmission could be ordered. The car also featured electrically adjustable rear shock absorber settings, a separately controlled rear passenger heater and optional West-of-England cloth-trimmed seats as well as many smaller amenities such as individual reading lamps.

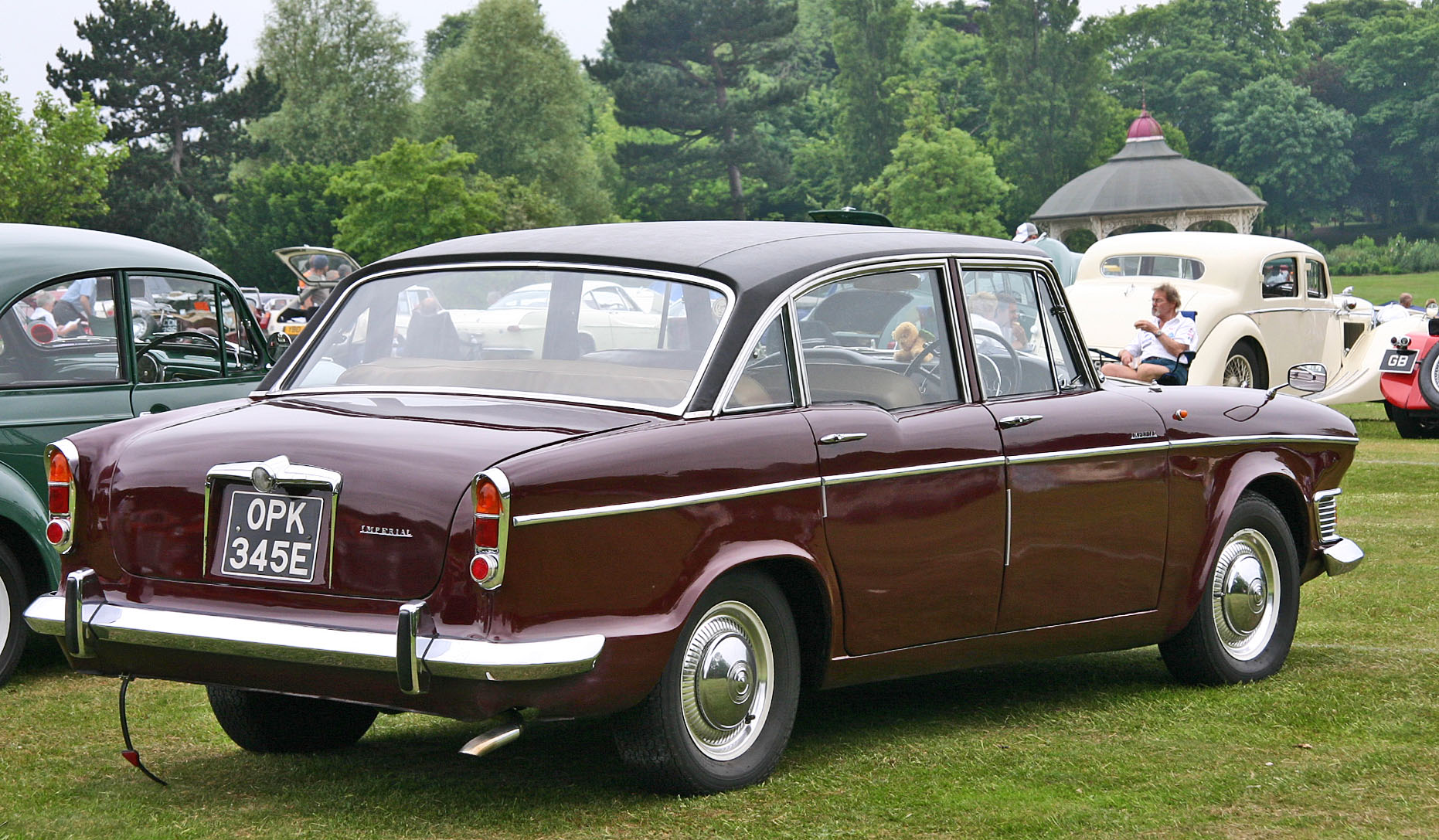
Humber Imperial 1964-67

The Rootes Group ceased production of the Series Va version in July 1967, by which time the group was under the control of the American Chrysler Corporation. The last of the big Humbers were assembled by Chrysler in Melbourne, Australia. Plans to introduce a V8 engine, and for the Chrysler 180/2L to be marketed as a Humber in the UK did not materialise, although a small number of Chrysler LA engine (318ci) powered prototypes were built.

== Export markets and foreign assembly ==
While the post-World War II home market for the car continued as before, the Rootes Group also marketed the car for export. The Super Snipe was assembled in Australia, commencing in 1953 with the Mark IV. From 1956 the car was available with automatic transmission, but the model was discontinued shortly afterwards.

Super Snipes were also assembled in New Zealand for a number of years by Rootes Group and Chrysler importer Todd Motors which later became Mitsubishi New Zealand.
