= Humber Pig =

British lightly armoured truck

Humber Pig (Truck, 1 Ton, Armoured, 4x4, Humber)
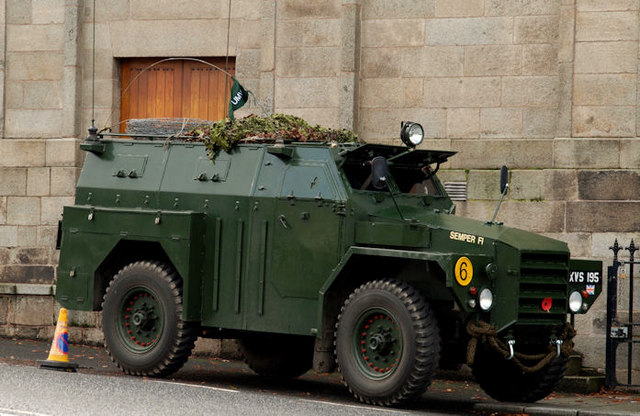
- Mk 1 British Army Pig
- Type: Armoured personnel carrier
- Place of origin: United Kingdom

Production history
- Manufacturer: Humber (Rootes Group); Joseph Sankey & Sons (GKN). Royal Ordnance Factories.
- No. built: ~1,700
- Variants: Mk 1, Mk 2

Specifications
- Mass: 10,500 lb (4.8 t) Mk 1; 14,300 lb (6.5 t) Mk 2
- Length: 4.93 m (16 ft 2 in)
- Width: 2.04 m (6 ft 8 in)
- Height: 2.12 m (6 ft 11 in)
- Crew: 2 + 6 (max. 8)
- Main armament: Limited fitting of 7.62×51mm L4 Light Machine Gun or .30 in (7.62×63mm) Browning M1919 machine gun
- Engine: Rolls-Royce B60 6-cyl 4.2 litre petrol I-6; 120 hp (89 kW)
- Operational range: 400 km (250 mi)
- Maximum speed: 64 km/h (40 mph)

The Humber Pig is a lightly armoured truck used by the British Army from the 1950s until the early 1990s. The Pig saw service with the Royal Ulster Constabulary (RUC) chiefly as an armoured personnel carrier from late 1958 until early 1970. The Pig became particularly well known from its presence on the streets of Northern Ireland during the worst of the Troubles.

== Variants ==
=== Official designations ===
- FV1601, FV1602 — unarmoured Cargo GS and FFW (fitted for wireless) Humber CT trucks.
- FV1609 — c1956 Prototype APC vehicle with removable rear roof, canvas roof, and removable windscreens.
- Mk 1 FV1611 and FV1612 plus FV1609 vehicles converted to Mk 1 Pig spec with fully integrated rear roof and armour. Side storage boxes in Northern Ireland use to prevent the attachment of explosive devices.
- FV1620 — Humber Hornet, a dedicated converted FV1611 to Malkara missile-launching platform.
- Mk 2 FV1611 and FV1612 —Additional armour for protection against small-arms fire and rocket propelled grenades, "barricade removers" (heavy-duty bull bars) which enabled them to force their way through barricades erected in the streets.

=== Unofficial designations ===
Some vehicles were equipped with the machine gun turret from the Shorland ISPV. All below were developed for use in Northern Ireland:

- Flying Pig — FV1611 with extending riot screens either side and roof.
- Holy Pig — fitted with rooftop hatch surrounded by perspex screen (reference to the Popemobile)
- Kremlin Pig — fitted with wire screening for protection against rocket propelled grenades (RPG-7)
- Squirt Pig — fitted with a water cannon beside driver for riot control.
- Foaming Pig — fitted with a foam generator to diffuse bomb blasts.
- Felix Pig — modified for bomb disposal duties.
- Turret Pig — Has the machine gun from the Shorland armoured vehicle installed for operation in the Armagh area.

== Operators ==
=== Former operators ===
- United Kingdom
- United States - Palm Springs Police Department (acquired from a collector in 1997, donated to the San Diego Police Museum in 2022)

== Gallery ==
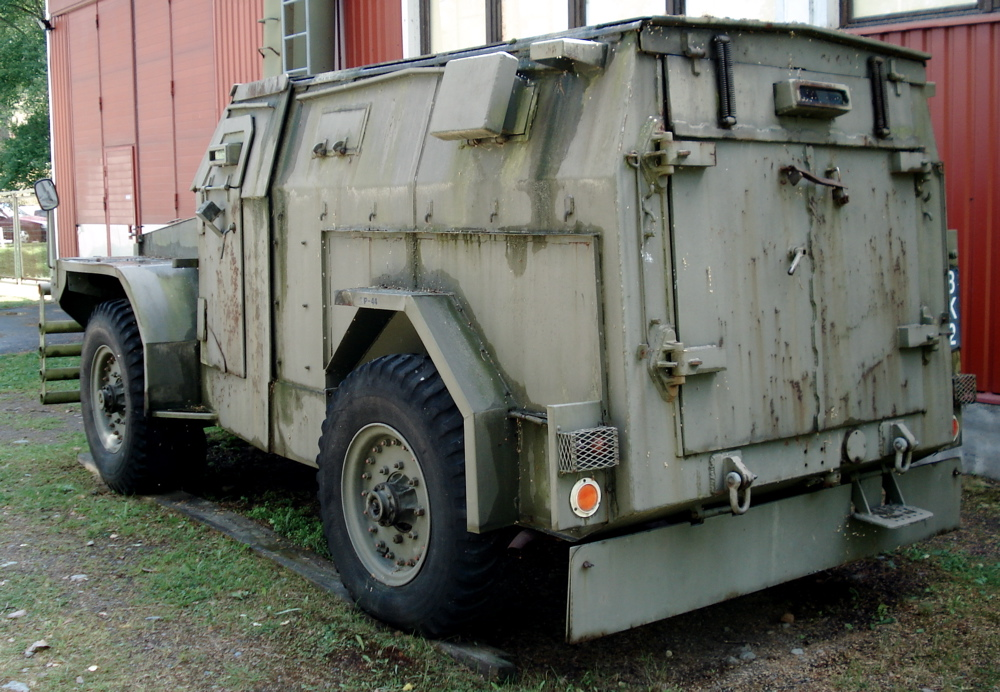
Pig rear view

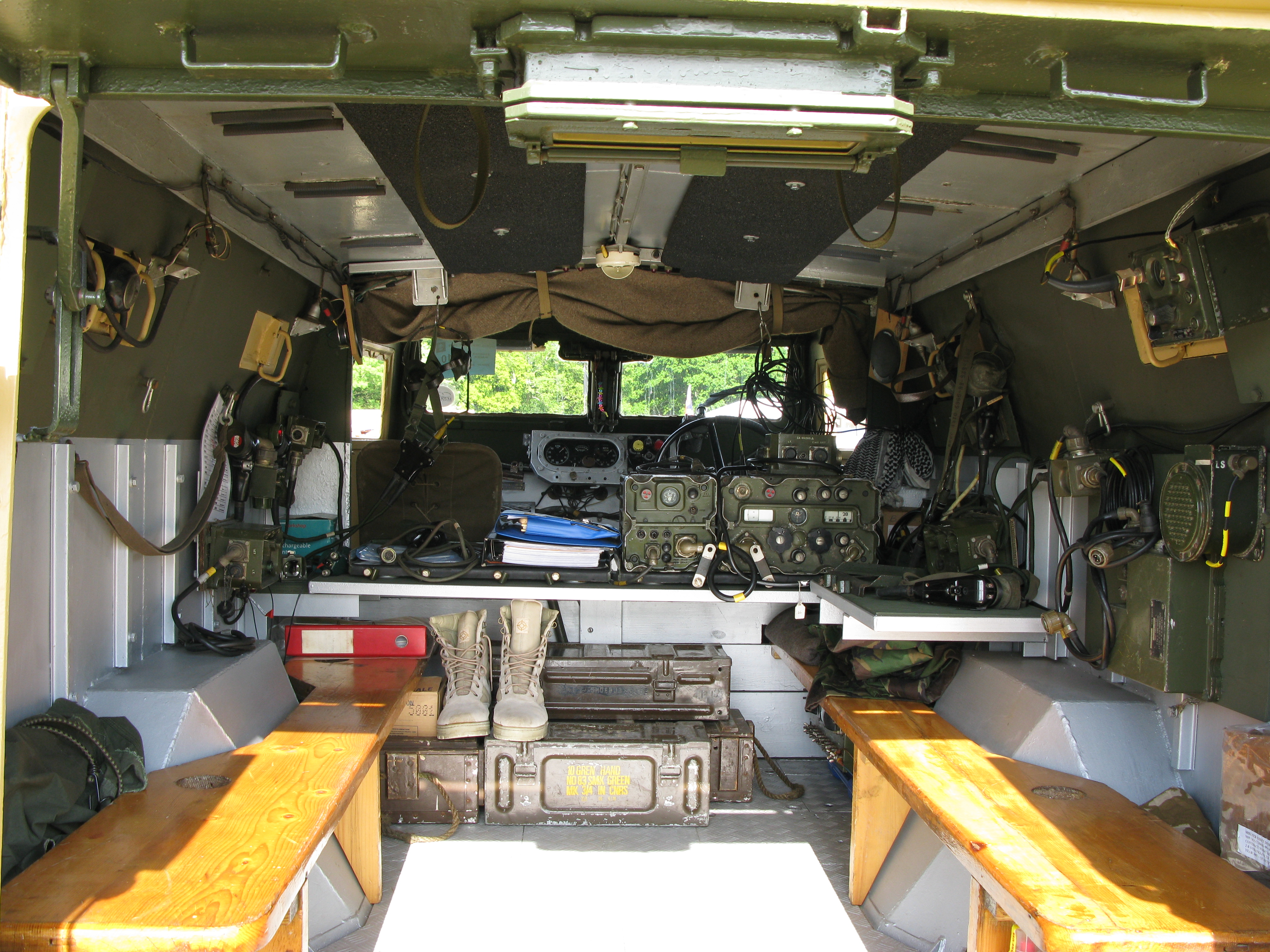
The interior of a Humber Pig seen from the rear

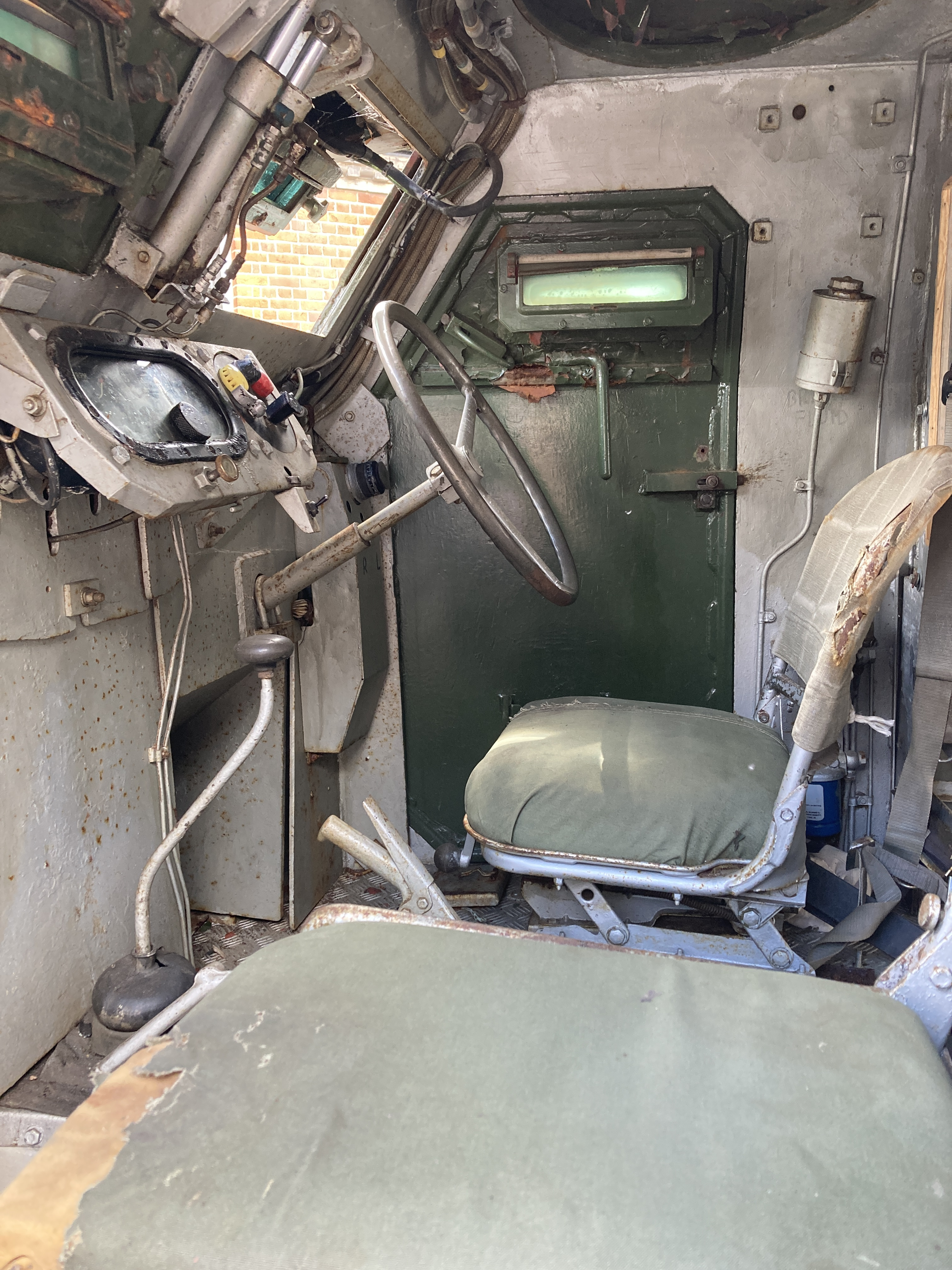
Humber pig unrestored driving cabin

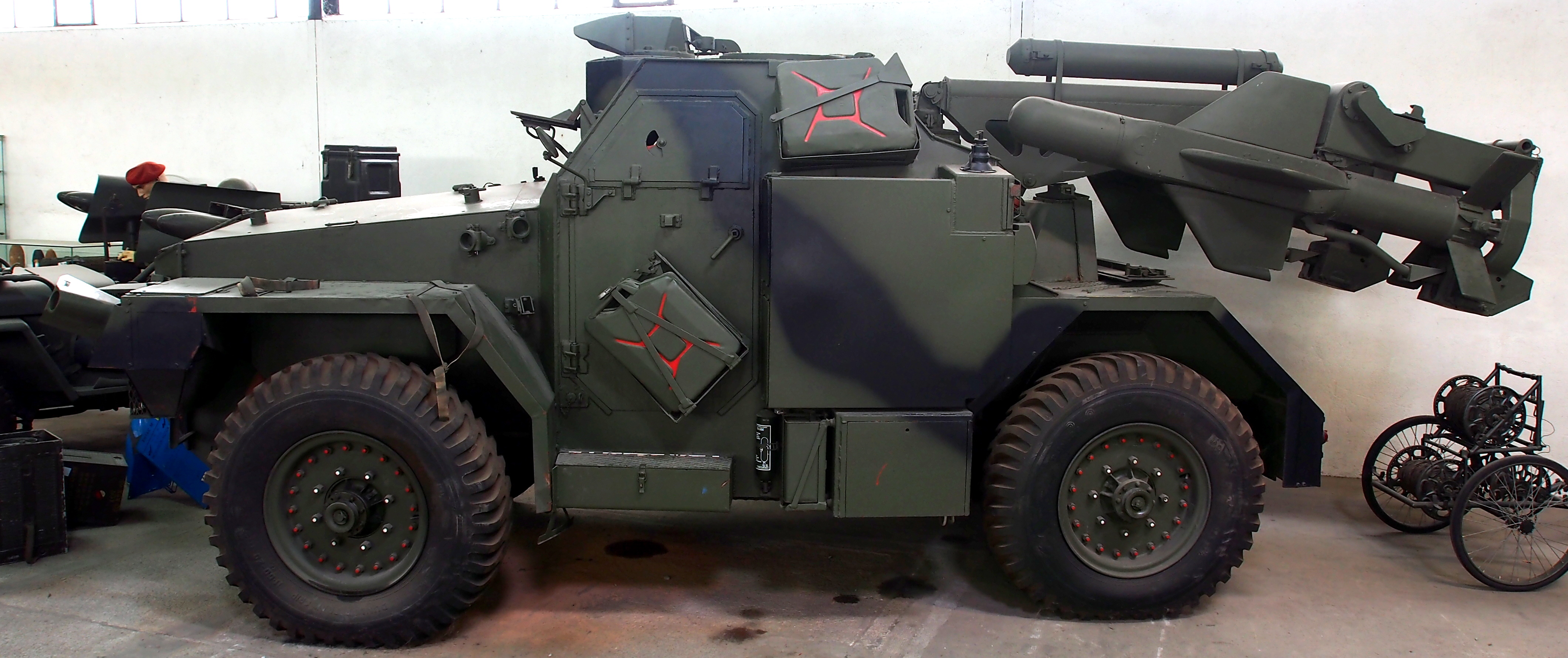
Humber Hornet

== See also ==
- Land Rover Tangi
- List of armoured fighting vehicles
