= Humber Hornet =

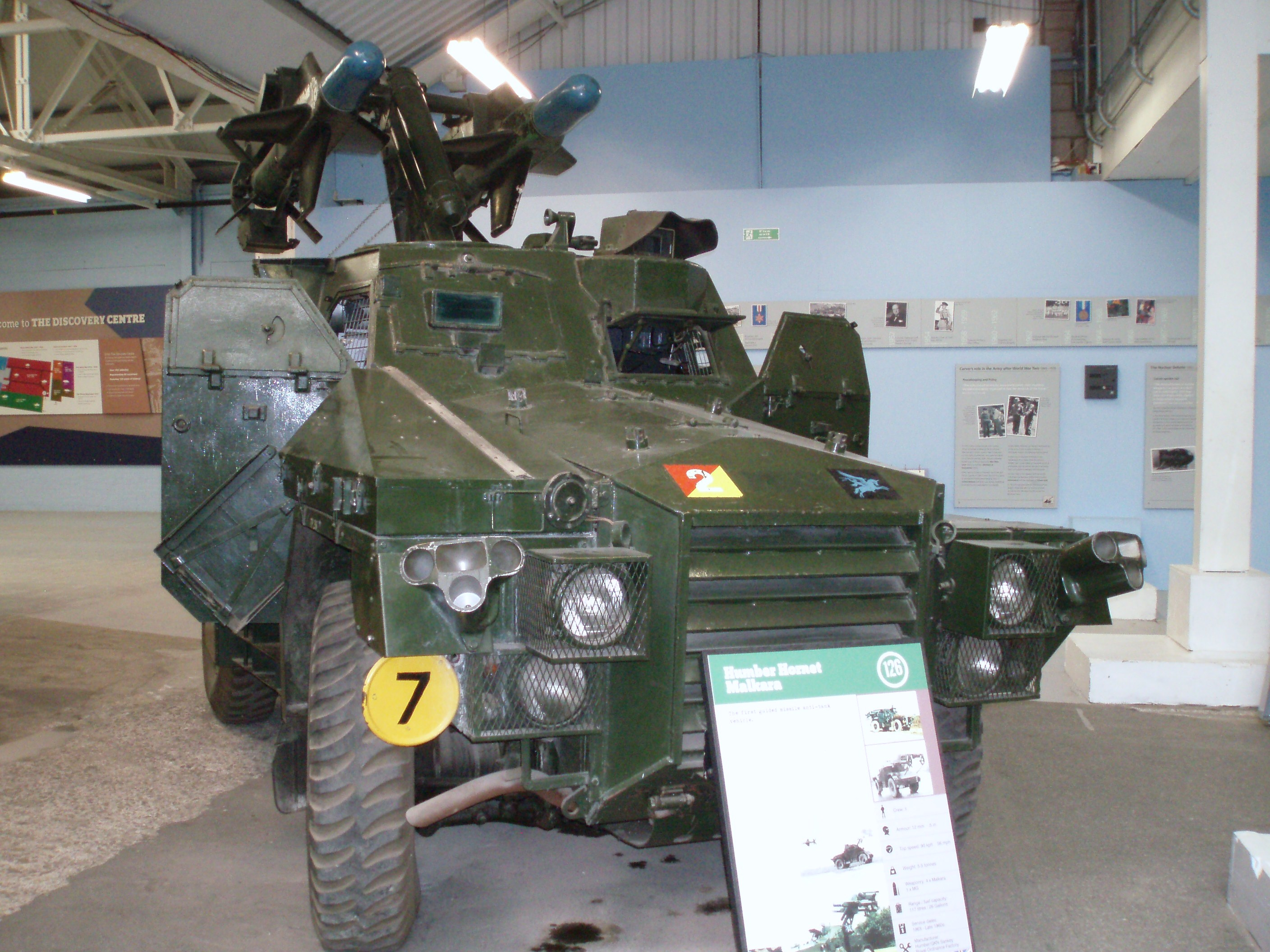
- Humber Hornet at Bovington Tank Museum
- Type: Anti-tank missile carrier
- Place of origin: Australia / United Kingdom

Service history
- Used by: Australia, United Kingdom
- Wars: Cold War

Production history
- Manufacturer: Humber (Rootes Limited)/Wharton Engineering
- Produced: 1958-1961

Specifications
- Mass: 5.70 tonnes
- Length: 5.05 m (16 ft 7 in)
- Width: 2.22 m (7 ft 3 in)
- Height: 2.43 m (8 ft 0 in)
- Crew: 3; commander, driver, gunner
- Armor: 8–16 mm (0.31–0.63 in)
- Main armament: 2x Malkara anti-tank missile
- Engine: Rolls-Royce B60 Mk 5A six cylinder petrol engine. 120 hp (89 kW)
- Suspension: Wheels 4x4
- Operational range: 402 km (250 mi)
- Maximum speed: 64 km/h (40 mph) on-road.

The FV1620 Humber Hornet (FV1620, truck 1-ton, air portable, armoured launcher, Hornet launcher) was a specialised air-deployable armoured fighting vehicle designed to carry the Malkara, an anti-tank guided missile developed by Australia and the United Kingdom.

== History ==
British units used the Hornet. Based on the British Army's FV1611 Humber "Pig" one-ton four-wheel drive armoured truck, it carried two Malkara, missiles on a retractable boom at the rear, as well as two reloads. It could be transported by air in a Blackburn Beverley and air-dropped on a cluster of 6 special parachutes.

== Operation ==
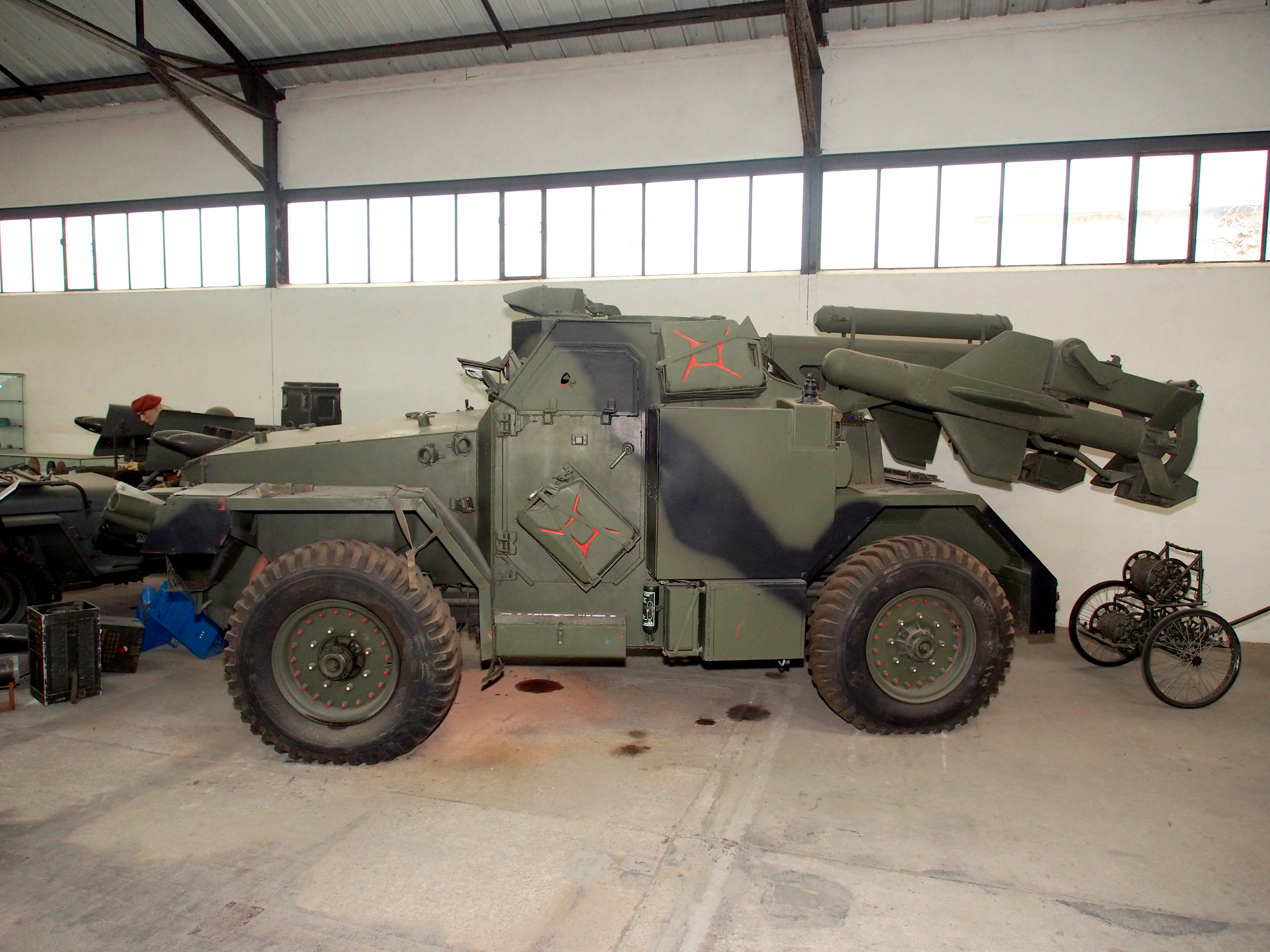
Hornet with the boom lowered

It was also operated by a squadron of the 2nd Royal Tank Regiment.

== See also ==
- List of armoured fighting vehicles

Comparable vehicles

- M551 Sheridan
