= Humber Limited =

British automotive and bicycle manufacturer

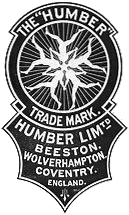
- Type: Private (1887–1931); Subsidiary (1931–1967)
- Industry: Automotive
- Founded: 1887
- Founder: Thomas Humber
- Defunct: 1967; 59 years ago
- Successor: Chrysler Europe
- Headquarters: Coventry, England
- Key people: William Rootes; Reginald Rootes
- Products: Bicycles, motorcycles, automobiles
- Parent: Rootes Group (1932–1967)

Humber (marque)
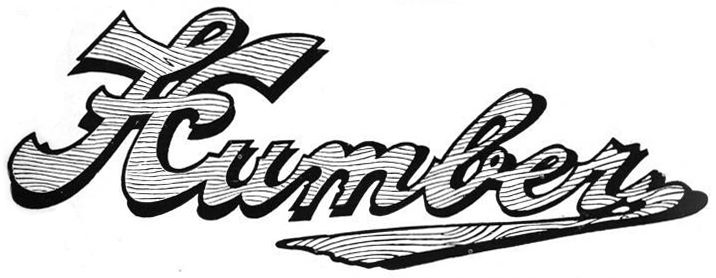
- Product type: Automotive
- Current owner: PSA Group
- Country: United Kingdom
- Discontinued: 1976; 50 years ago
- Previous owners: Private investors (1868–1932); Rootes Group (1932–1967); Chrysler Europe (1967–1979)

Humber Limited was a British manufacturer of bicycles, motorcycles, and cars, incorporated and listed on the stock exchange in 1887. It took the name "Humber & Co Limited" because of the high reputation of the products of one of the constituent businesses that had belonged to Thomas Humber. A financial reconstruction in 1899 transferred its business to Humber Limited.

From an interest in motor vehicles beginning in 1896, the motor division became much more important than the cycle division, and the cycle trade marks were sold to Raleigh in 1932. The motorcycles were withdrawn from sale during the 1930s depression.

Humber is now a dormant marque for automobiles as well as cycles. Following their involvement in Humber through Hillman in 1928, the Rootes brothers acquired 60 percent of Humber's ordinary capital, sufficient for a controlling interest. The two Rootes brothers joined the Humber board in 1932 and began to make Humber the holding company for vehicle manufacturing members of what became their Rootes Group.

By 1960, annual production was around 200,000 vehicles. Previous insistence on Rootes family control, however, may have led to under-capitalisation of the business. Building a brand-new car, the Hillman Imp, proved beyond the resources of Humber and the Rootes Group, and their businesses were bought by the Chrysler Corporation in 1967.

== Ownership and control ==
- Private investors from incorporation and first listing in 1887
- Amalgamation with Hillman 1928, Hillman newly controlled by Rootes brothers
- Rootes Securities acquires 60 per cent of Humber, Hillman is made a Humber subsidiary 1932
- Chrysler Corporation acquires control of Rootes Motors (colloquially "Rootes Group") 1967

Wholly owned operating subsidiaries

- Commer (Commercial Cars Ltd) 1925
- Hillman (merger 1929 — subsidiary 1930)
- Thrupp & Maberly 1926 — coachbuilders, ex Rootes Securities 1932
- Clément-Talbot 1935 renamed Sunbeam-Talbot
- Sunbeam Motor Car Company 1935 trolleybuses only
- Karrier Motors 1934
- British Light Steel Pressings 1937, merged with Thrupp & Maberly in 1939
- Tilling-Stevens 1950 (partly owned until February 1964)
- Singer Motors 1956 (partly owned until February 1964)

== History ==
=== 1887–1918 ===
Cycle industry

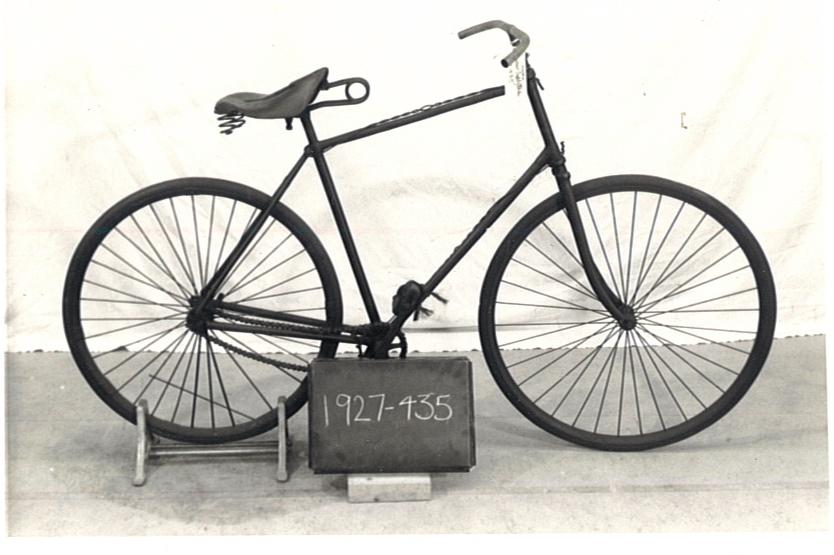
Safety bicycle, c. 1890

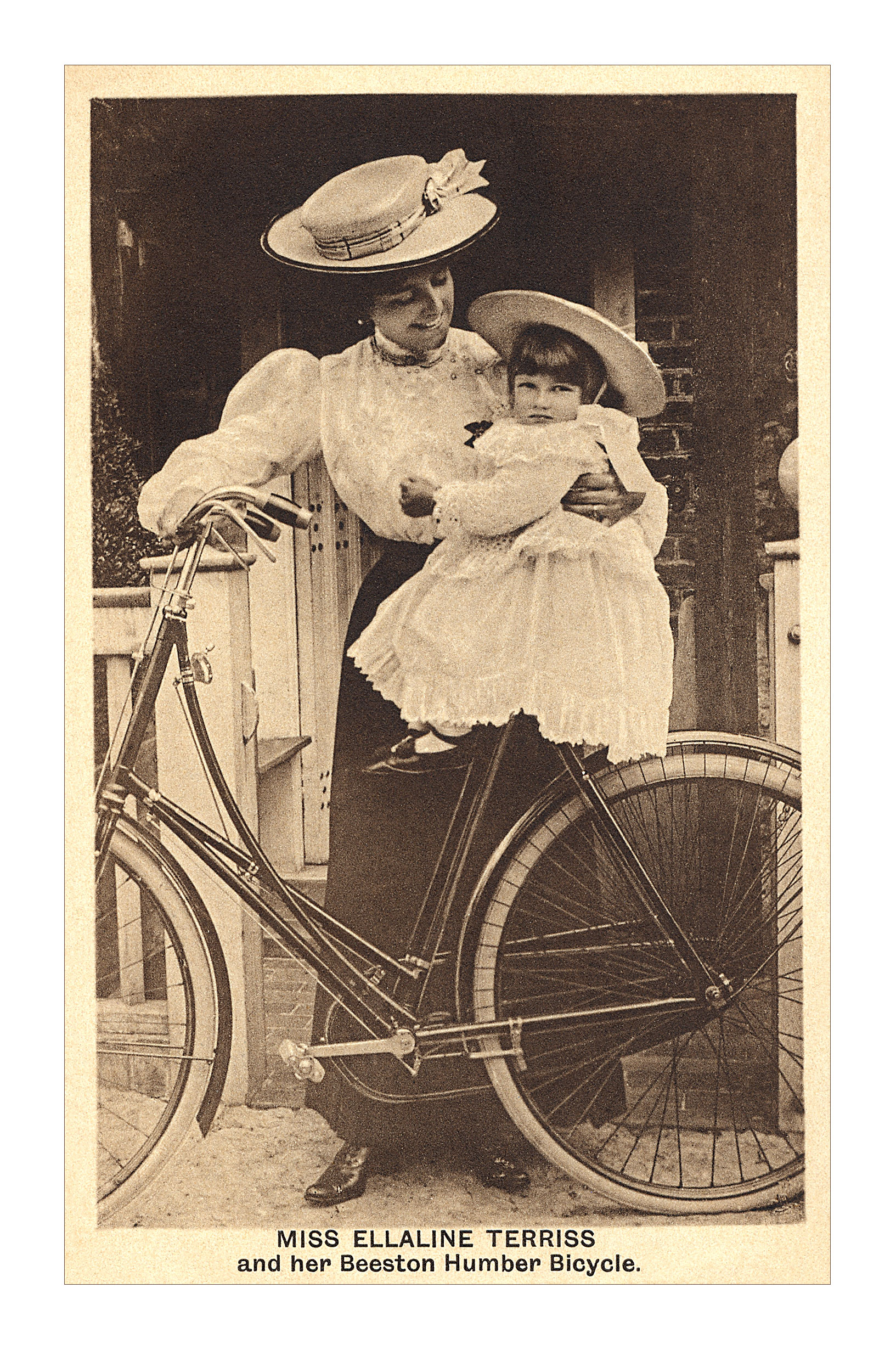
Postcard 1907

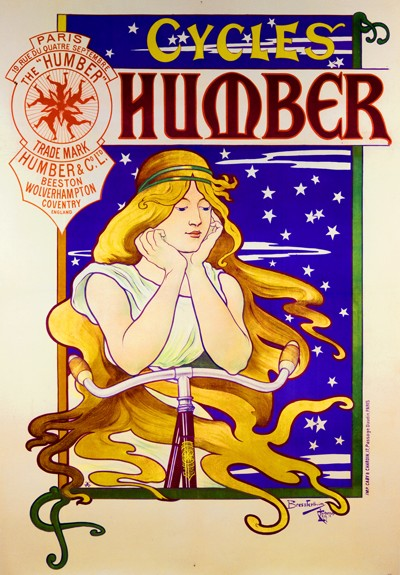
Humber France

The cycle industry was consolidating in the late 1880s and partners Thomas Humber and fledgling company promoter T Harrison Lambert sold their Humber cycles business to investors who added a number of other substantial cycle manufacturers (Note: Humber & Co, Beeston; Coventry Cycle Company, Coventry; Express Cycle Works, Wolverhampton; Wellington Works, Coventry; ". . . at once becomes the most powerful combination in this growing and lucrative industry.") and then floated the new combine on the stock exchange. Such was the public's recognition of Humber products and their high quality and reliability the whole new organisation was named Humber & Co Limited though Humber's was not the largest component. Thomas Humber agreed to manage the whole enterprise with its works in Coventry and Wolverhampton as well as Beeston. He retired in 1892 at the end of his 5-year contract.

Humber expanded into Europe and in 1896 their subsidiary, Humber (France), joined with La Société des Vélocipedes Clément and La Société des Cycles Gladiator obtaining stock exchange listings in order to form "one of the largest Cycle monopolies in Europe" and with the intention of improving the position of Humber (France). The directors expressed the greatest interest in the new industry of motor carriages and cycles for which extensive works were to be erected by the monopoly at Levallois Perret. At the time of the flotation prospective investors were told that agencies were already established in all principal towns in France, and the cities: St Petersburg, Copenhagen, Milan, Athens, Brussels, Bucharest, Amsterdam, Lisbon, Buenos Ayres, Santiago, Constantinople, Algiers, Sfax, Tunis, Alexandria, Saigon, Hong Kong, Port Said and throughout the whole of South America. The chairman of the new monopoly was chairman of Dunlop Pneumatic Tyre Co and another director was the manager of Dunlop (France). Negotiations between the parties were completed by Ernest Terah Hooley.

The ambitious new monopoly was not successful, disputes between the partners dragged through the English courts until the turn of the century. A severe economic recession in 1899 then brought about a financial reconstruction and the incorporation of a new company, Humber Limited, to continue the existing business.

Motorcycles

Humber experimented with motorcycles from their early days, and in 1899 Bert Yates won the first track race for motorcycles in Coventry on a Humber motorcycle. Later models switched to using Minerva engines, but production ceased in 1906 as there was insufficient space at the factory. Motorcycle manufacture resumed in 1908 when the new Stoke factory opened, and the new range were exhibited in 1908 at the annual Stanley show. Humber produced many new models of motorcycle in the pre-war years, but production of motorcycles ceased during the First World War.

Motor tricycles

Restored classic Beeston Humber motorised tricycle at the National Motorcycle Museum, UK

In 1899 Humber produced a motorised tricycle at their Beeston works with a De Dion Bouton engine of 1.75 hp or optionally 2.25 hp. This had electric ignition (early De Dion Bouton engines used hot tube ignition), and was capable of 30 mph (48 km/h). The price in December 1899 was £84. This tricycle was based on the De Dion-Bouton tricycle and built under licence.

First series production cars

In 1896 Humber built a prototype and nine production motorcars in their new Coventry premises. In November 1896 a car was exhibited at the Stanley Cycle Show in London. They are claimed to be the first series production cars made in England.

At Humber & Company's next general meeting in 1897 the managing director said they had received many letters asking if they would produce a motorised vehicle, and that they had in fact been working on this project for two years, but had delayed production until they found a suitably reliable engine. Having now found an engine they were gearing up for production.

The first Humber car was produced in 1898 and was a three-wheeled tricar of the 'sociable' type powered by a single cylinder Turrell engine. Their first conventional four-wheeled car appeared in 1901. Cars went into production in Beeston near Nottingham as well as Stoke, Coventry but to separate designs. Just as with bicycles Beeston Humber products retained their high quality image. The Beeston works closed in 1908 on the opening of the new works at Stoke. Humber's profit went from £16,500 in 1905 to £106,500 the next year and £154,400 in 1907.

On 12 March 1908 the new works was officially opened at Stoke, then just outside the city of Coventry. New buildings covered 13.5 acres and allowed for the employment of 5,000 hands. The new works was designed to be capable of producing 150 cars and 1,500 cycles per week. Another financial reconstruction was made in 1909. In 1911 they took over the Centaur Cycle Company.

By this time a wide range of cars was produced from the 998cc Humberette to several six-cylinder 6-litre models. In 1913 Humber was second only to Wolseley as the largest manufacturer of cars in the United Kingdom. Revived by the war Humber produced motorcycles and bicycles for the War Office as well as cars.

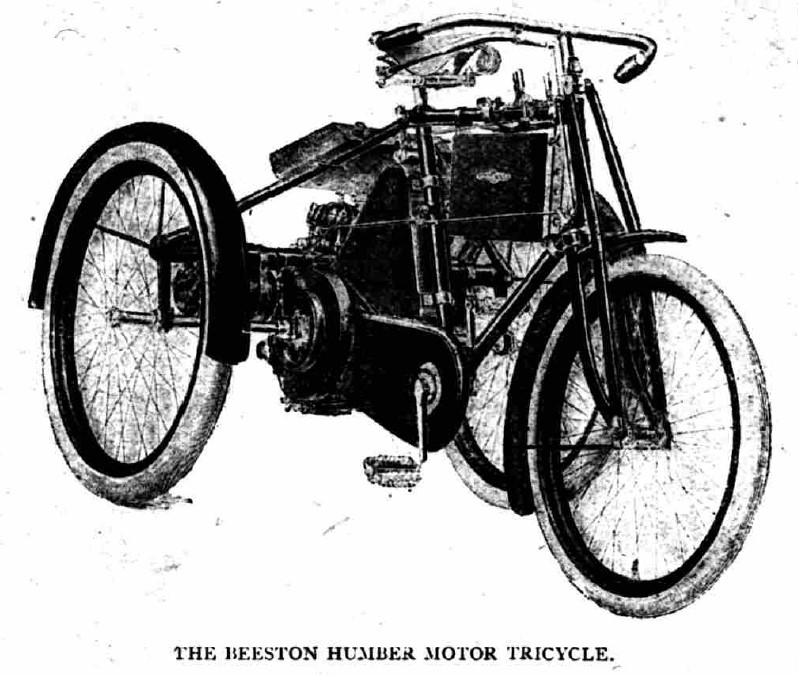
The Humber 'Beeston' motor tricycle of 1899

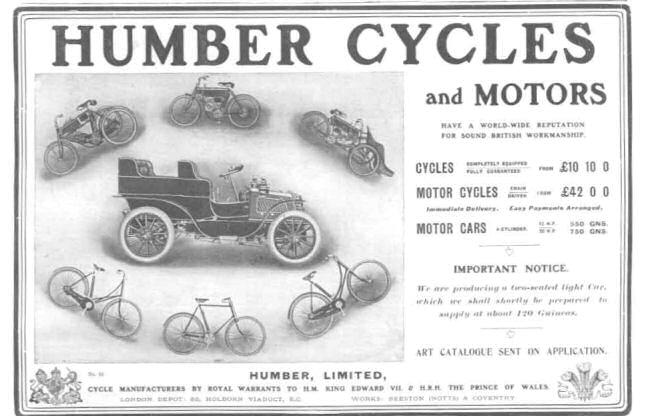
Cycle manufacturers to the King, 1903

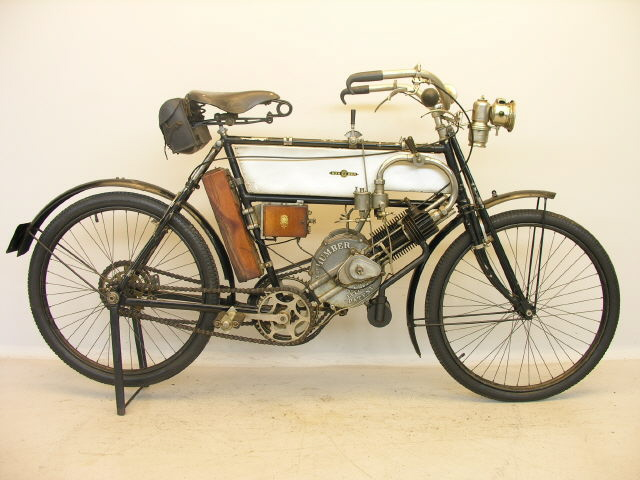
Motorcycle 2¾ hp, 1904

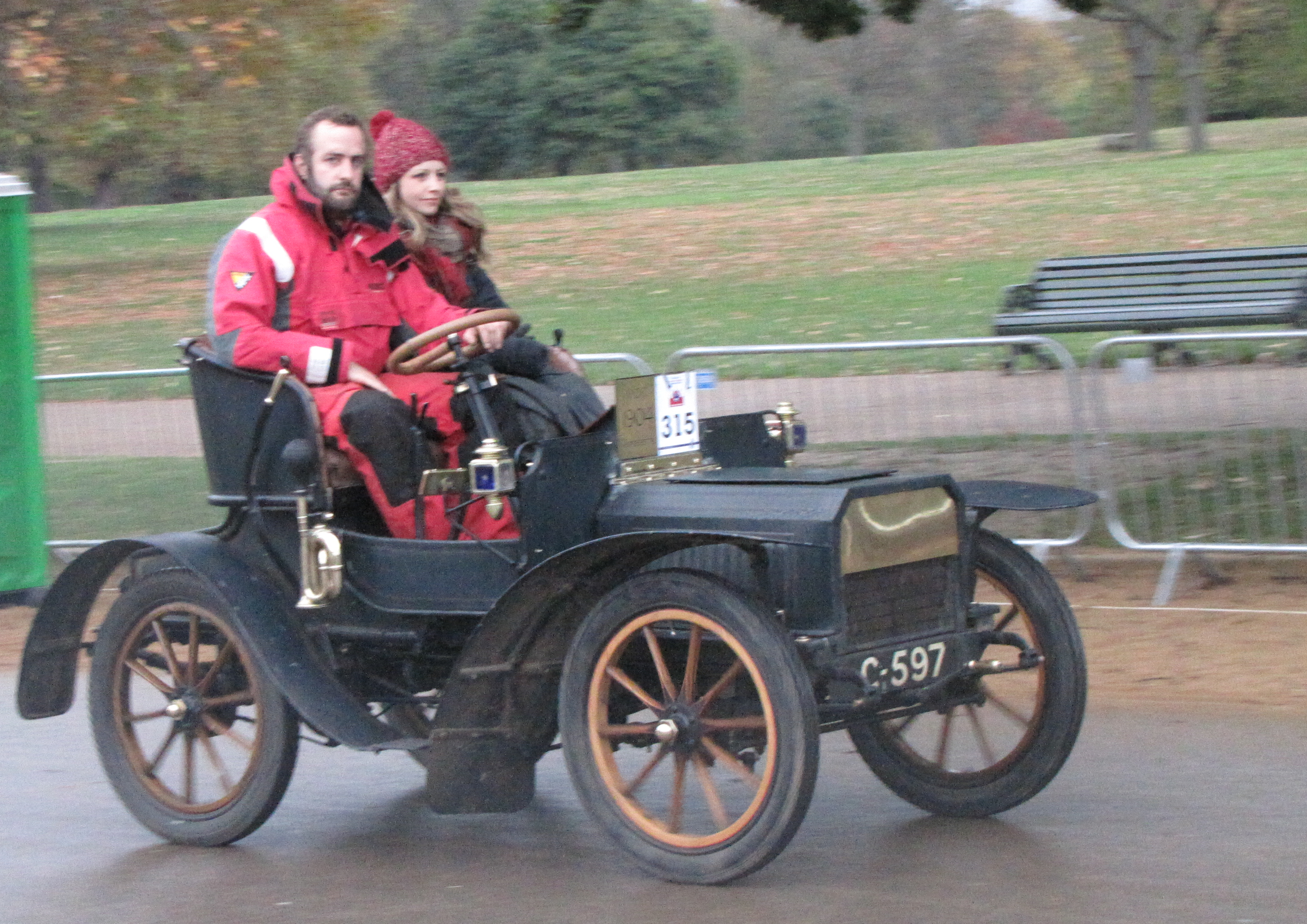
Humberette 5 hp 1904

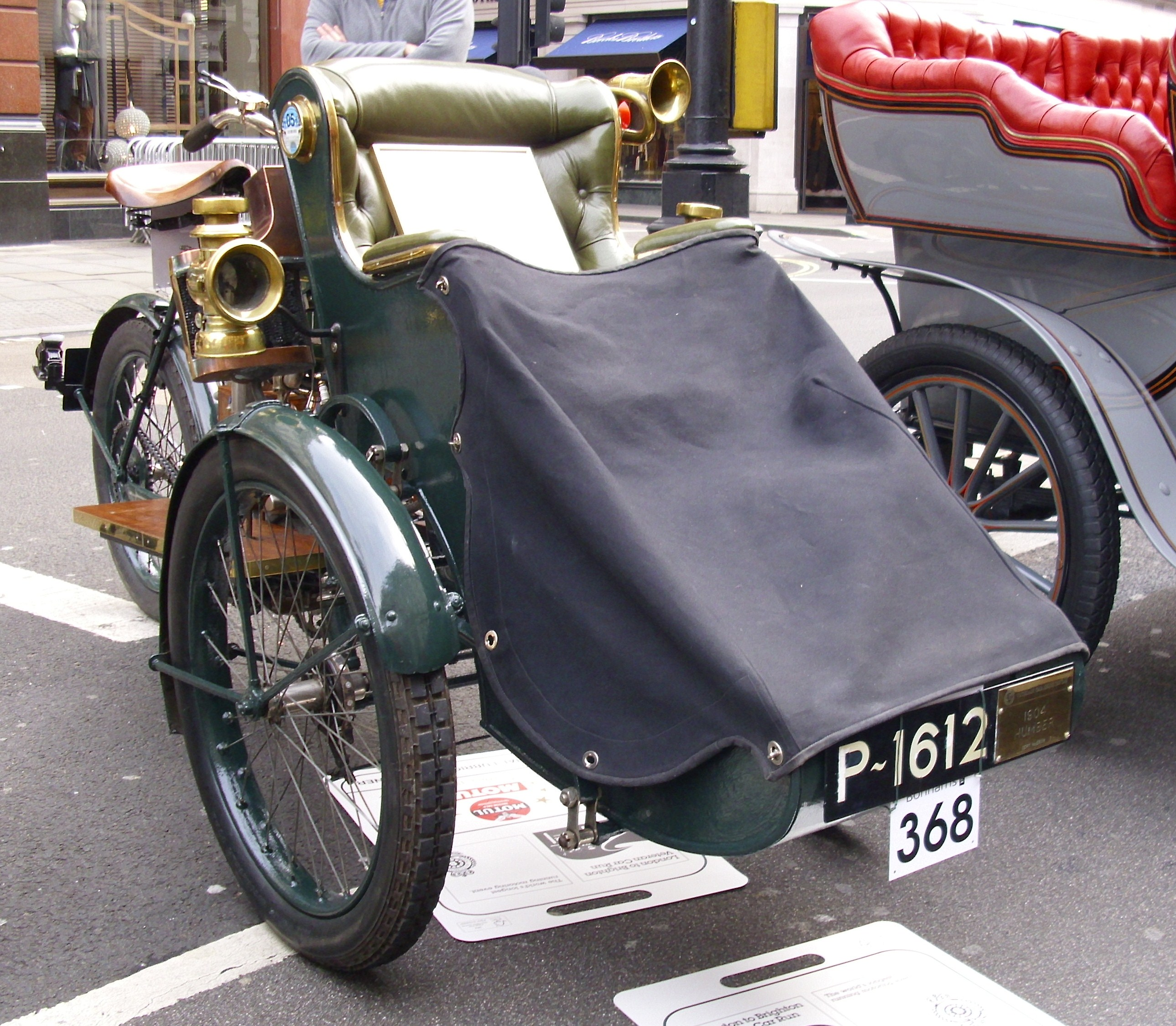
Forecar 1904

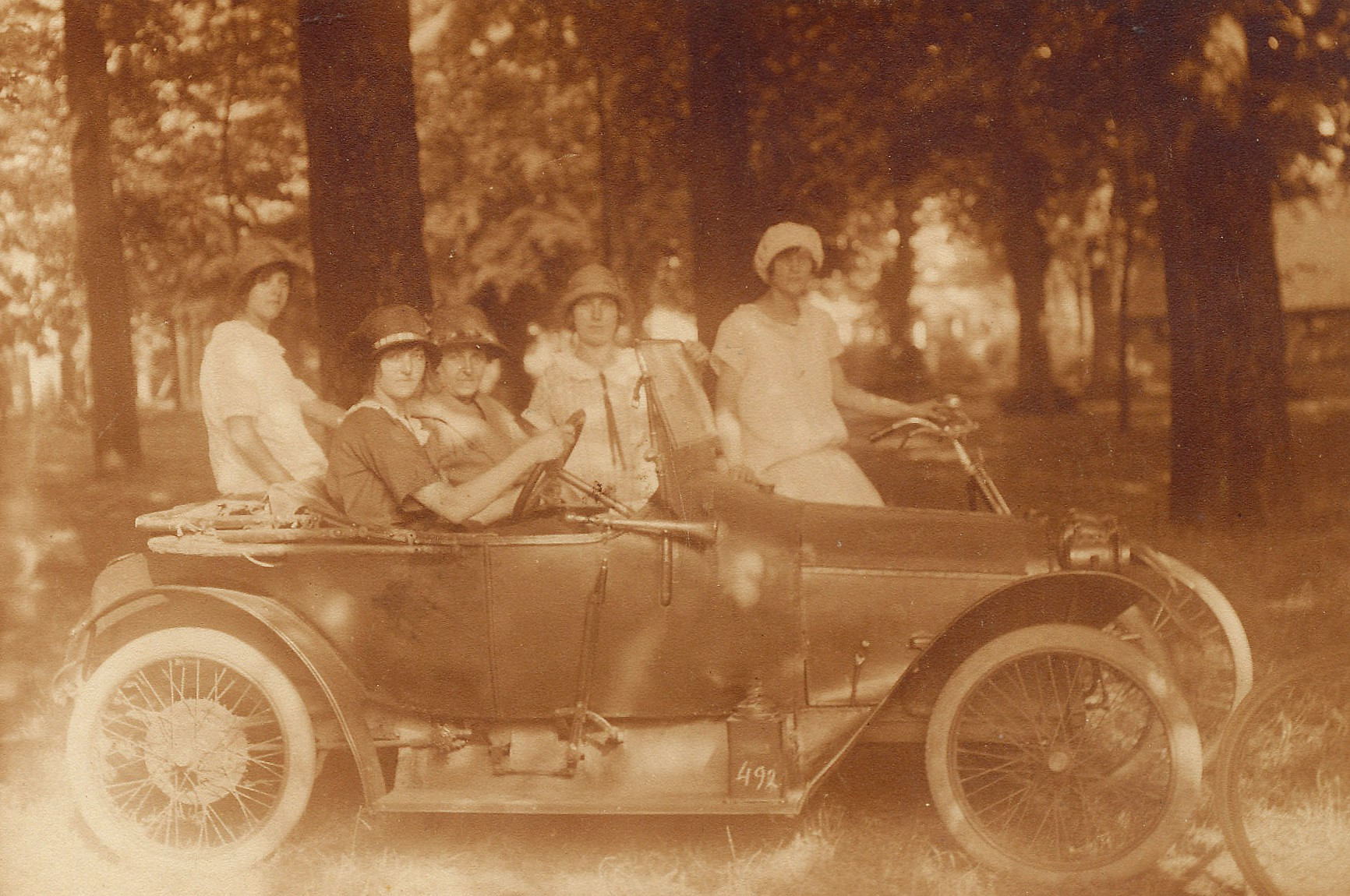
Humberette c. 1912

=== 1919–1939 ===
There were postwar slumps in the early 1920s and in addition the public were moving from pedal cycles to motorcycles as well as to cars. Rover, Singer, Swift, Triumph and Riley all gave up their manufacture of cycles.

==== Humber acquisitions ====
In 1925 Humber moved into the production of commercial vehicles with the purchase of Commer.

In the year to 1928 Humber's chairman was obliged to report a loss for the second year running. Commer Cars' turnover was substantially increased but Commer did not return to profit. The bicycle business improved but motorcycles did not. Humber cars, the product being as the chairman put it of a distinctive class, were more influenced by conditions than were mass-produced vehicles. Humber he described as one of the oldest and best known higher grade cars.

Before Rootes

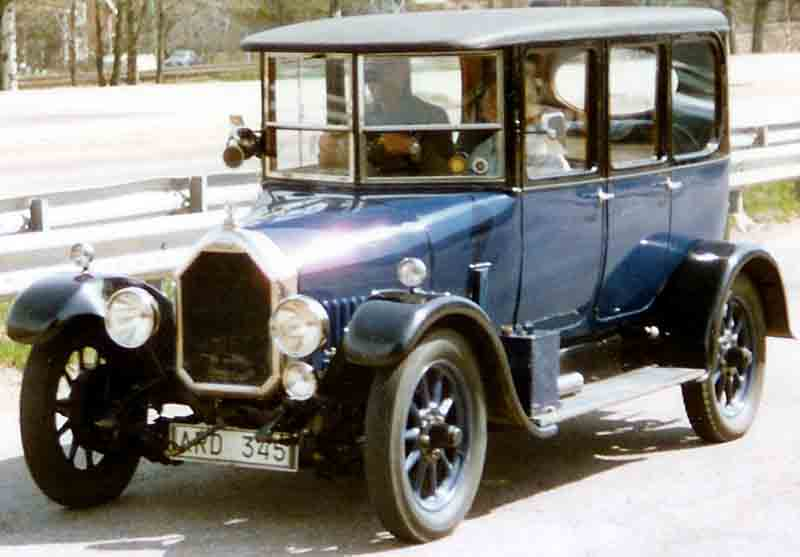
11.4 hp saloon 1924

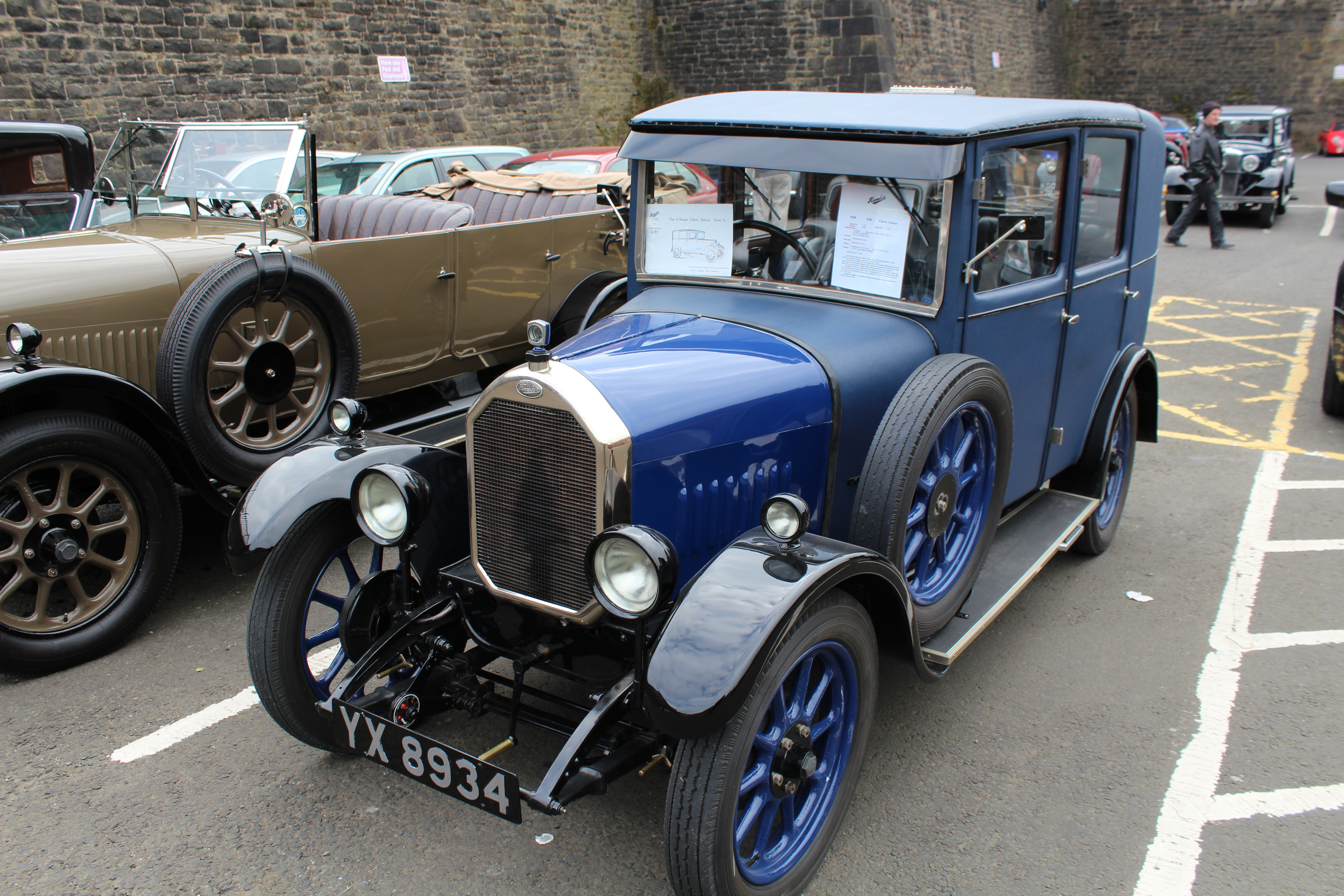
9-20 hp fabric saloon 1928

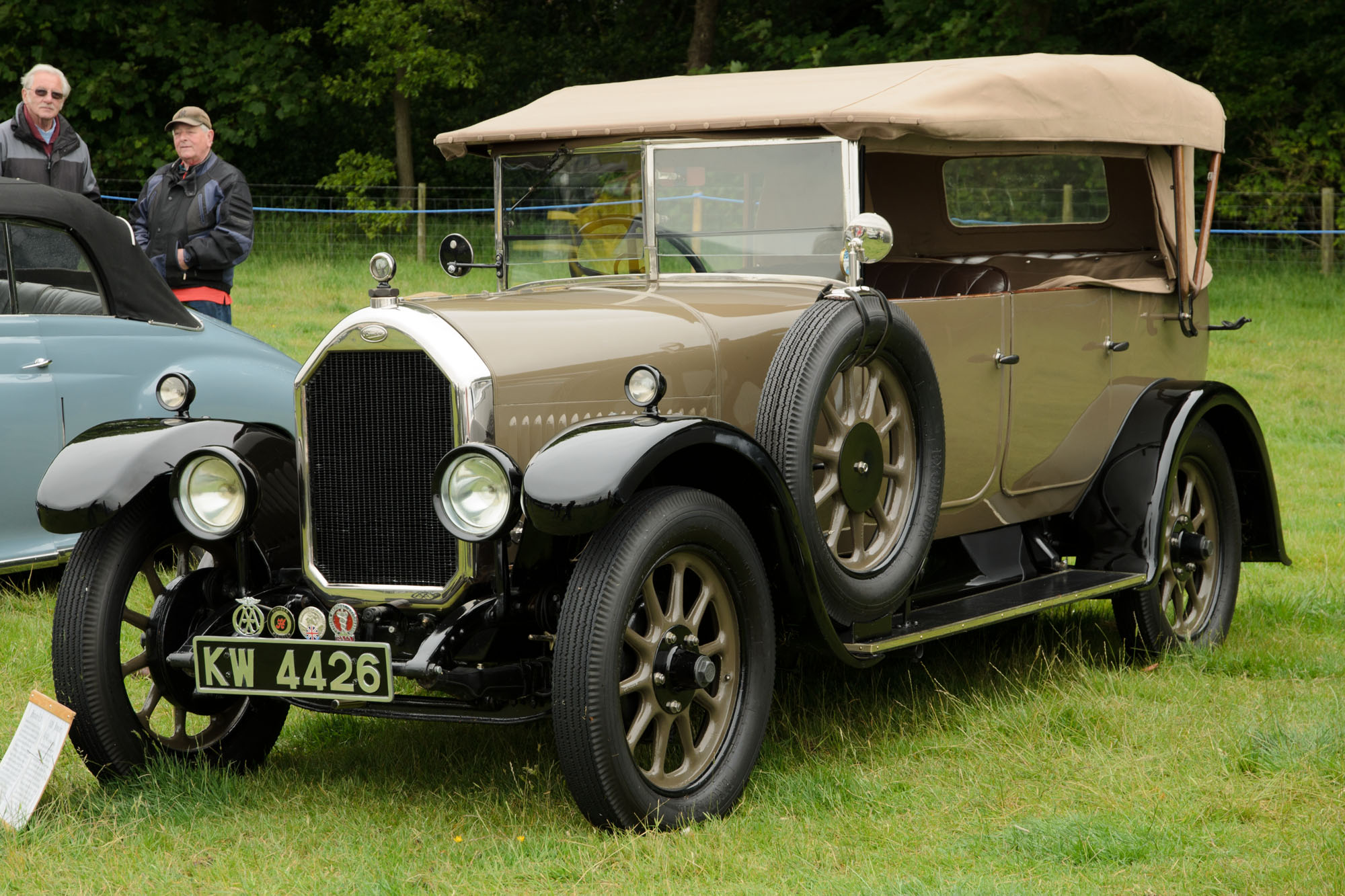
14-40 hp tourer 1928 in Humber Mole paintwork

The chairman, Stanley Brotherhood, told a special meeting of shareholders of the exceedingly good performance of one of the 14-40 cars driven by J W Fitzwilliam and his brother who had just returned from traversing 4,500 miles in central Europe including the worst roads in the Balkans. He then reported the "drastic redesign" of Humber's cars which together with improved appearance and performance and revised prices were expected to improve the products' performance in the marketplace.

Mention of the drastic redesign at that special meeting was followed by another meeting to discuss the amalgamation of Humber and its partly-owned subsidiary Hillman Motor Car Company. Hillman, the chairman explained, made one of the most popular medium priced cars and would provide a suitable partner to the distinctive Humber products. Shareholders were unanimous that the amalgamation should go ahead on the proposed terms.

In 1929 Hillman, under the control of the Rootes brothers, was amalgamated with Humber—the combine was not under the control of the Rootes brothers—but William Rootes' marketing skills had been immediately brought into play when Rootes Limited had been appointed "World Exporters". In December 1929 reviewing the 1929 year the chairman told shareholders Humber had now introduced three new models named: 16-50, for the 1928 Motor Show, Snipe and a seven-seater Pullman both for the October 1929 Motor Show. For the time being the 9-28 and 20-65 hp models would continue but at a reduced price.

After Rootes

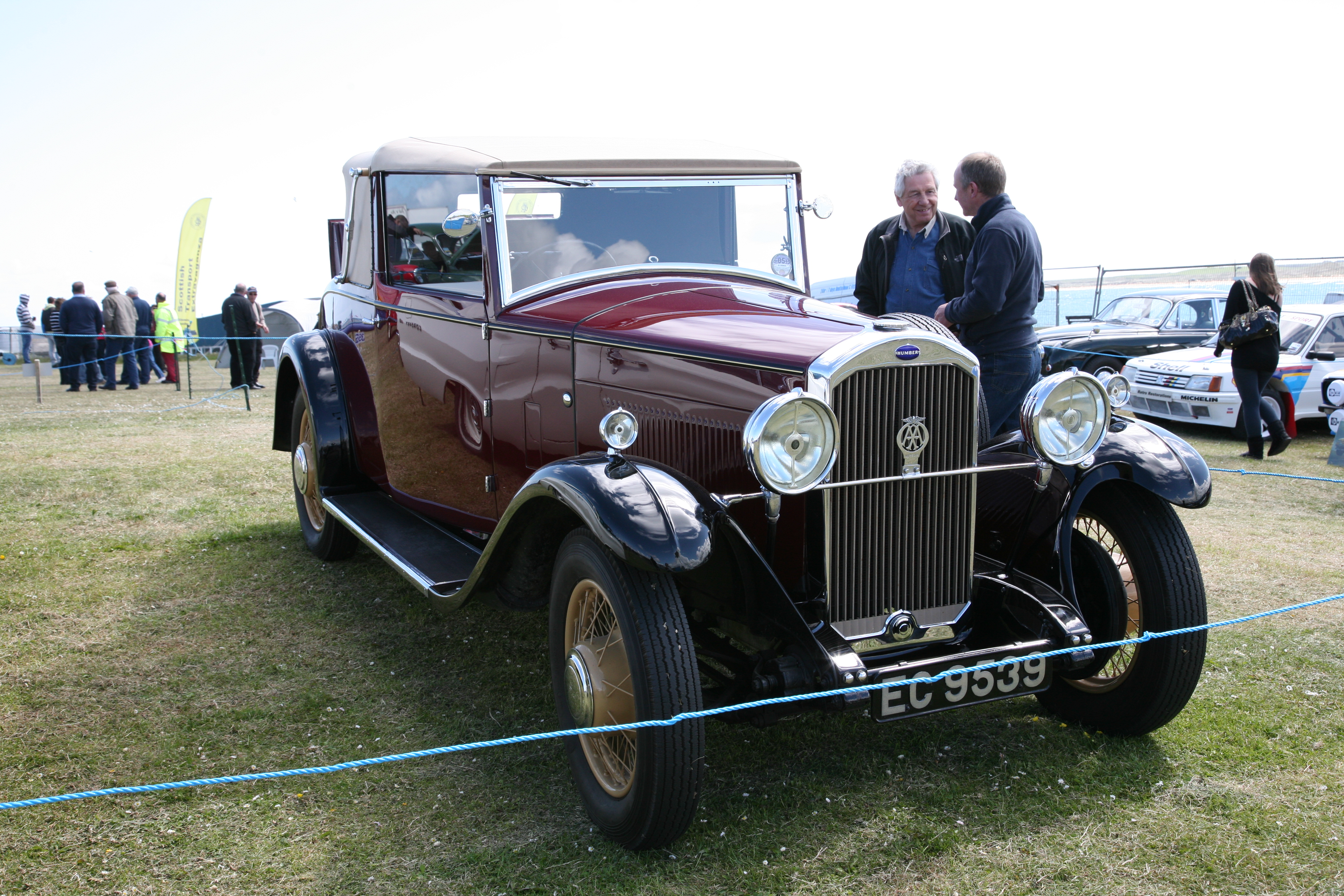
16-50 coupé 1930

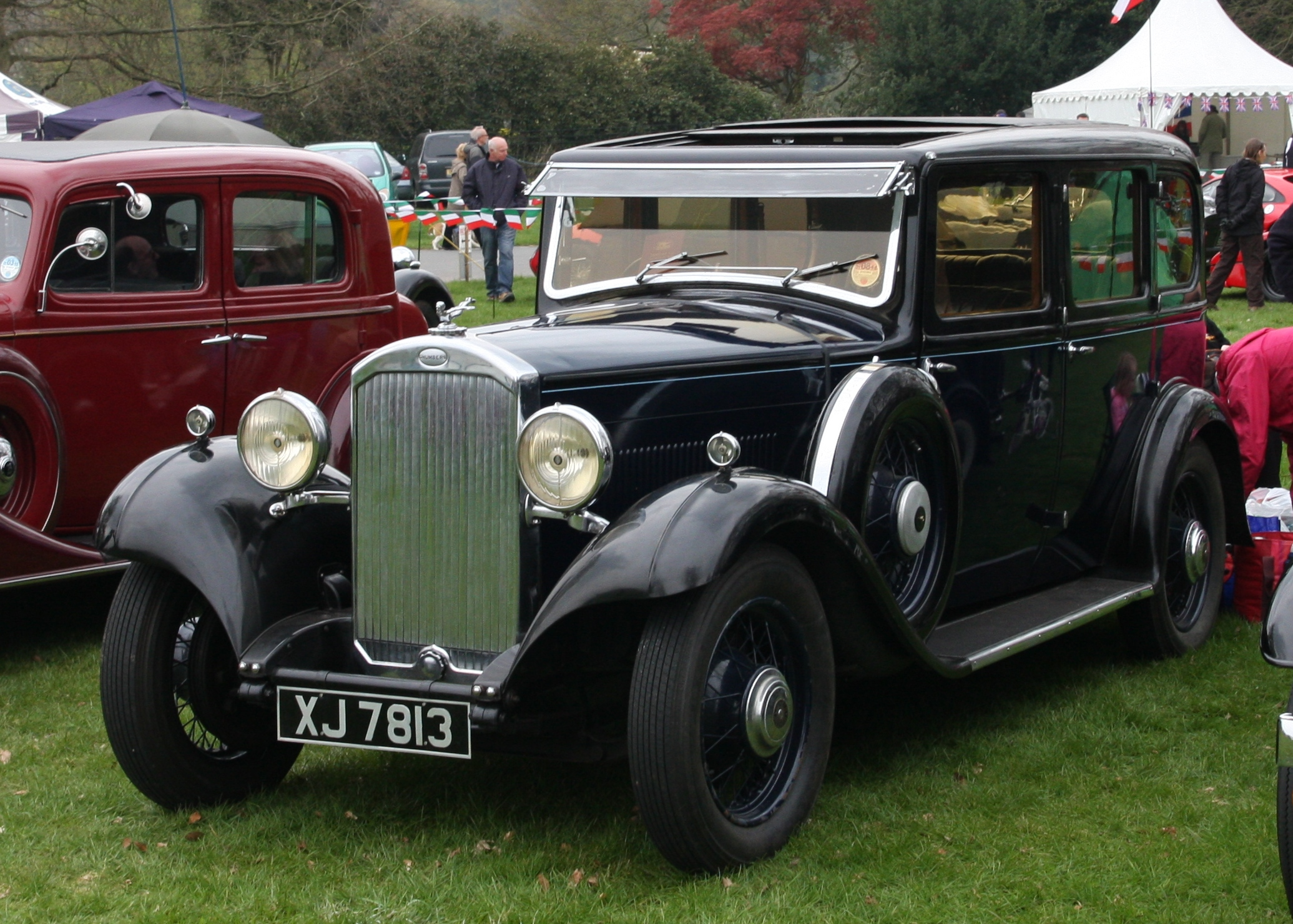
16-60 saloon 1933

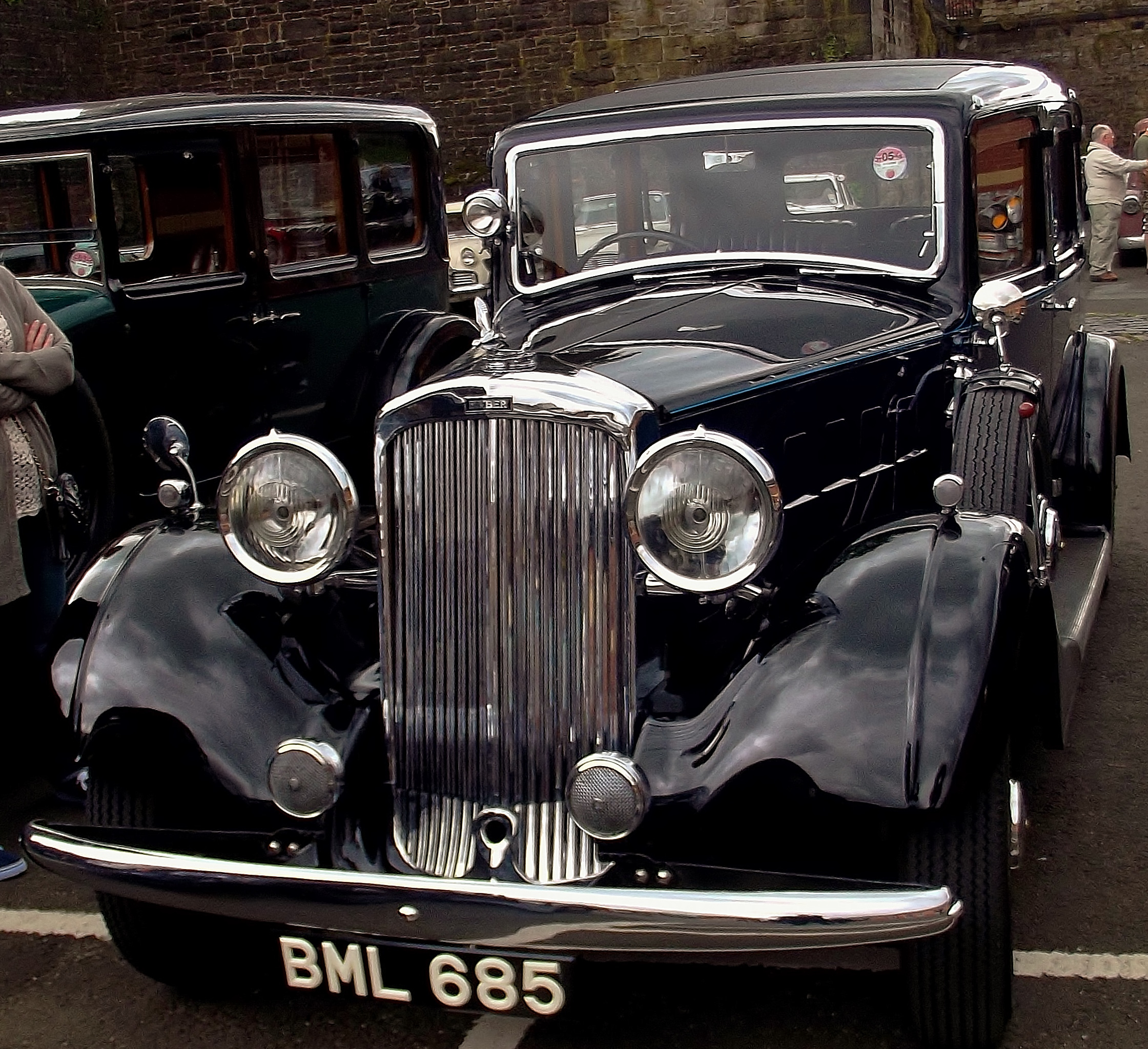
Snipe 1934

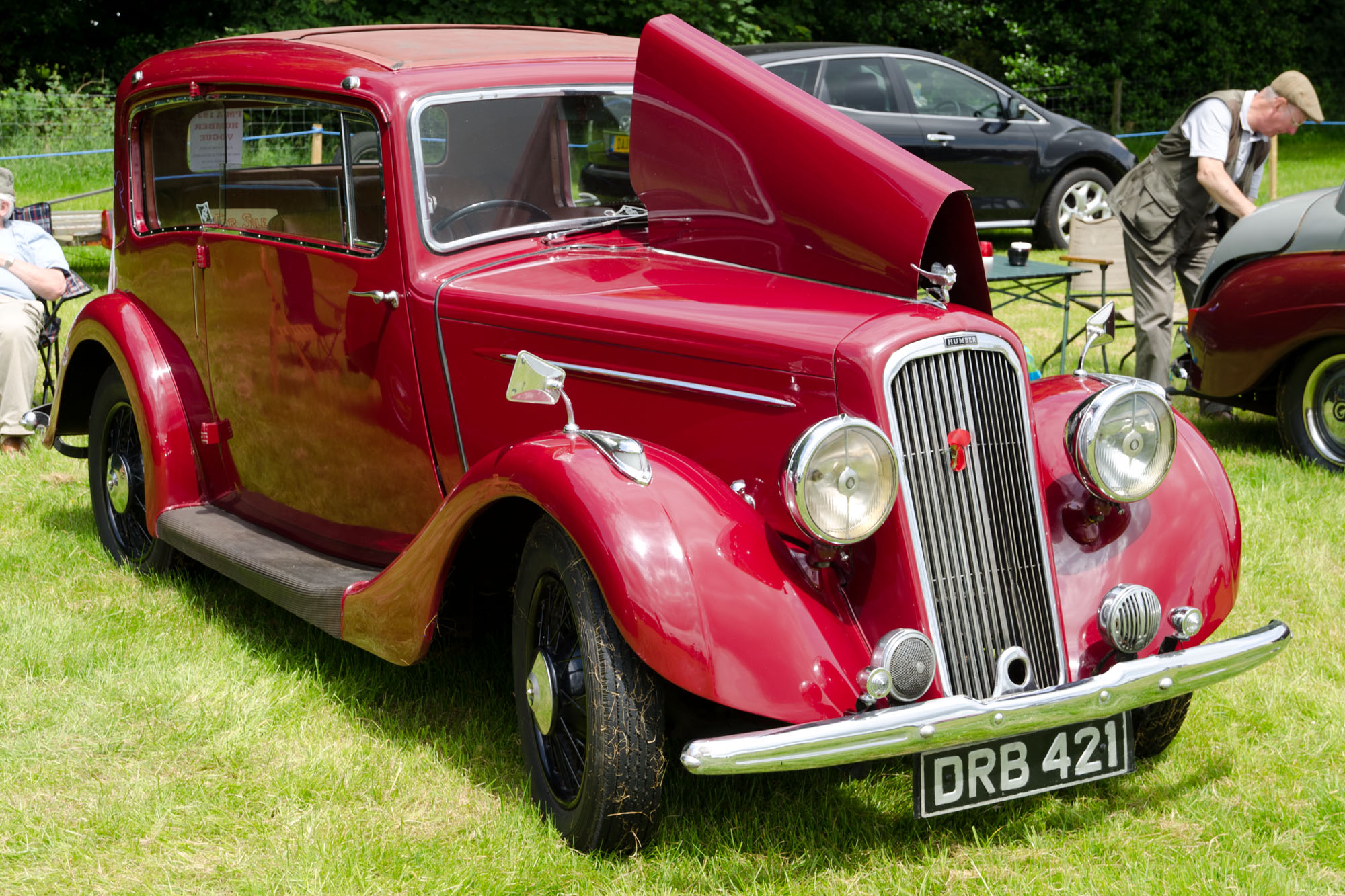
Vogue pillarless 1937

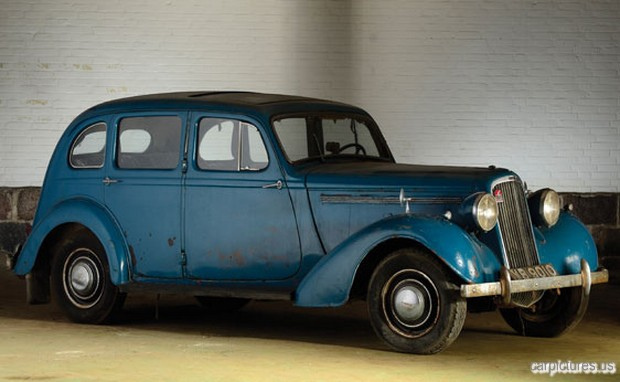
Snipe 1939

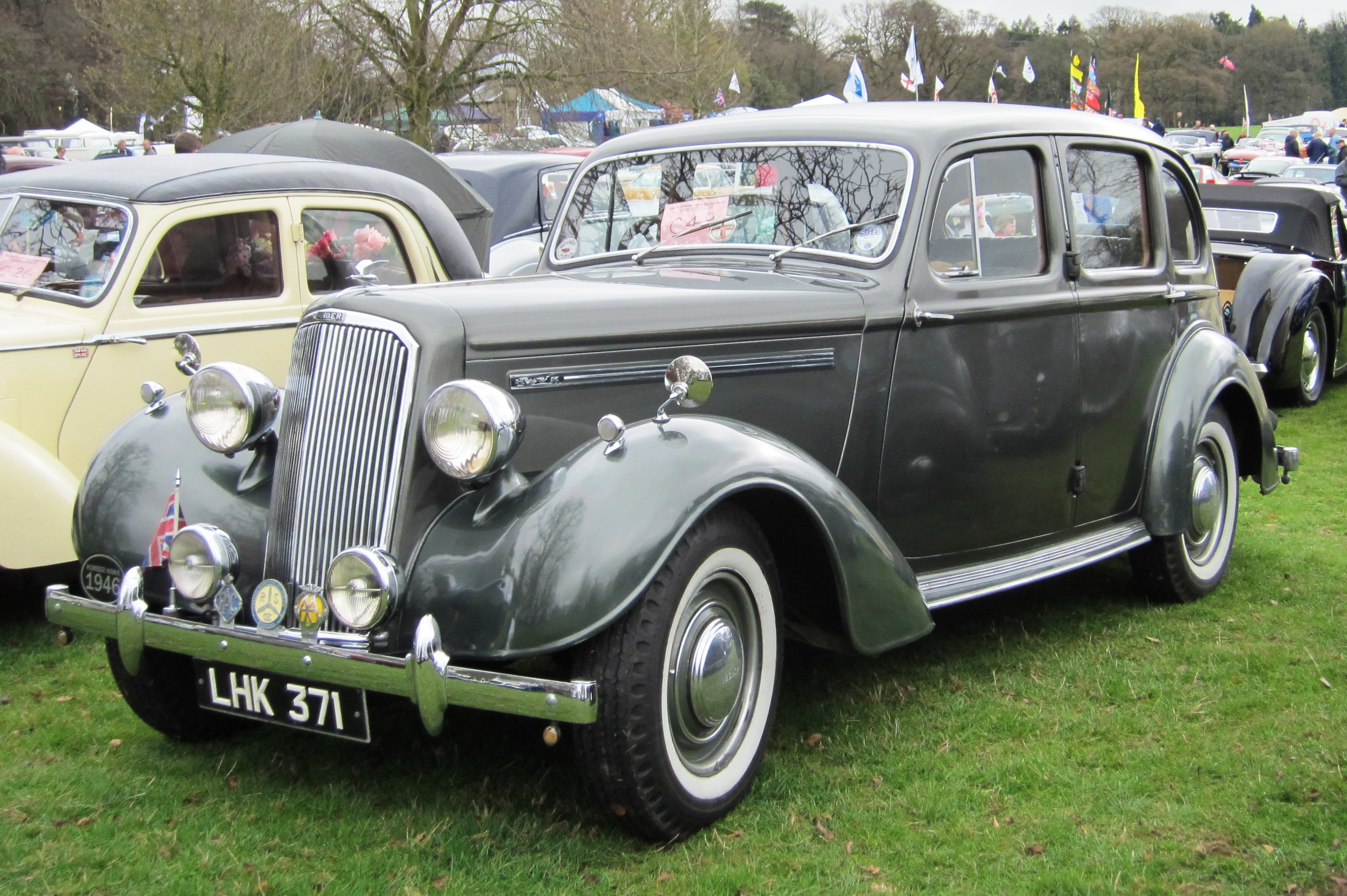
Hawk 1946 (ex Hillman)

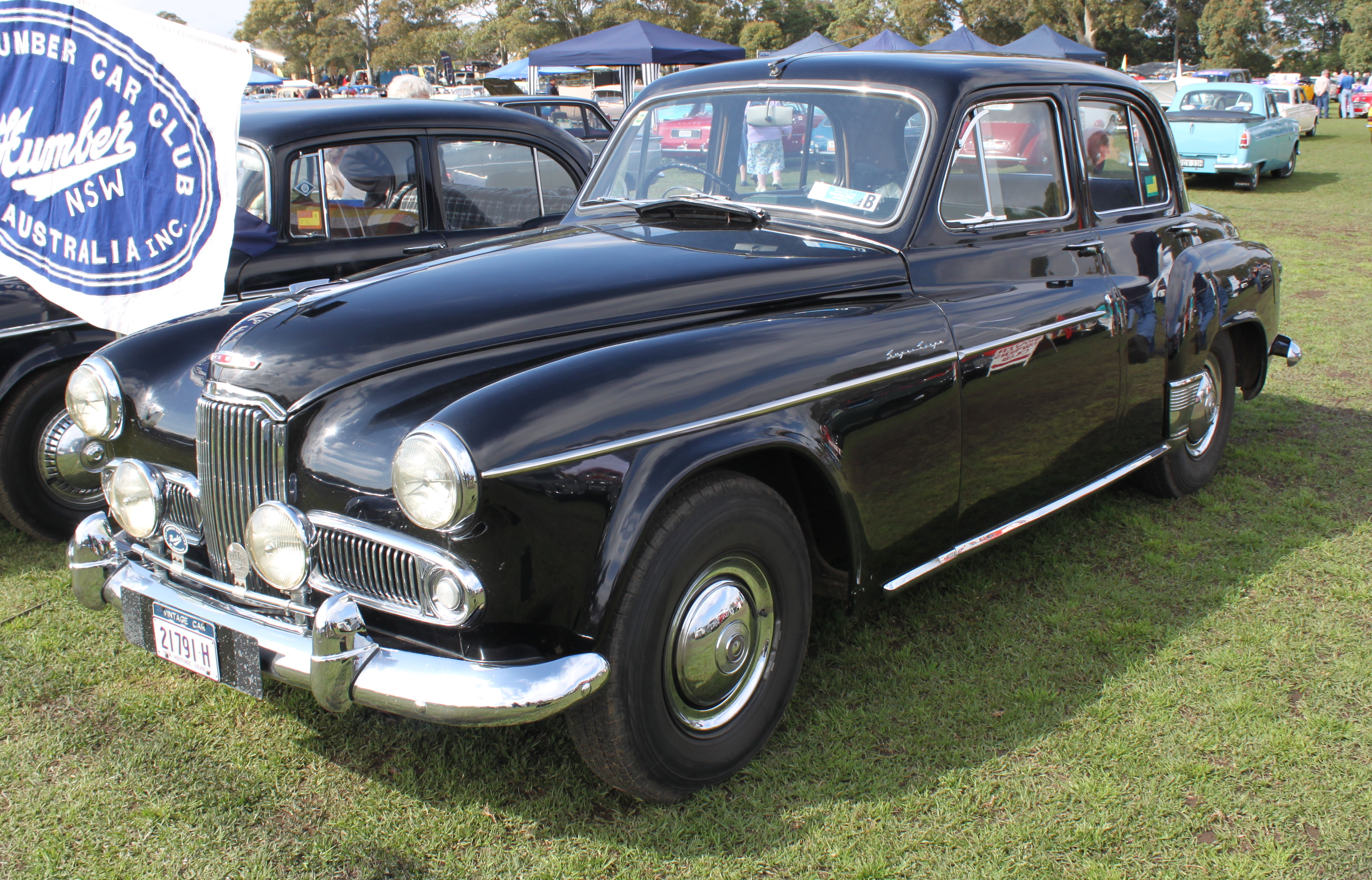
Snipe Mark IV 1955

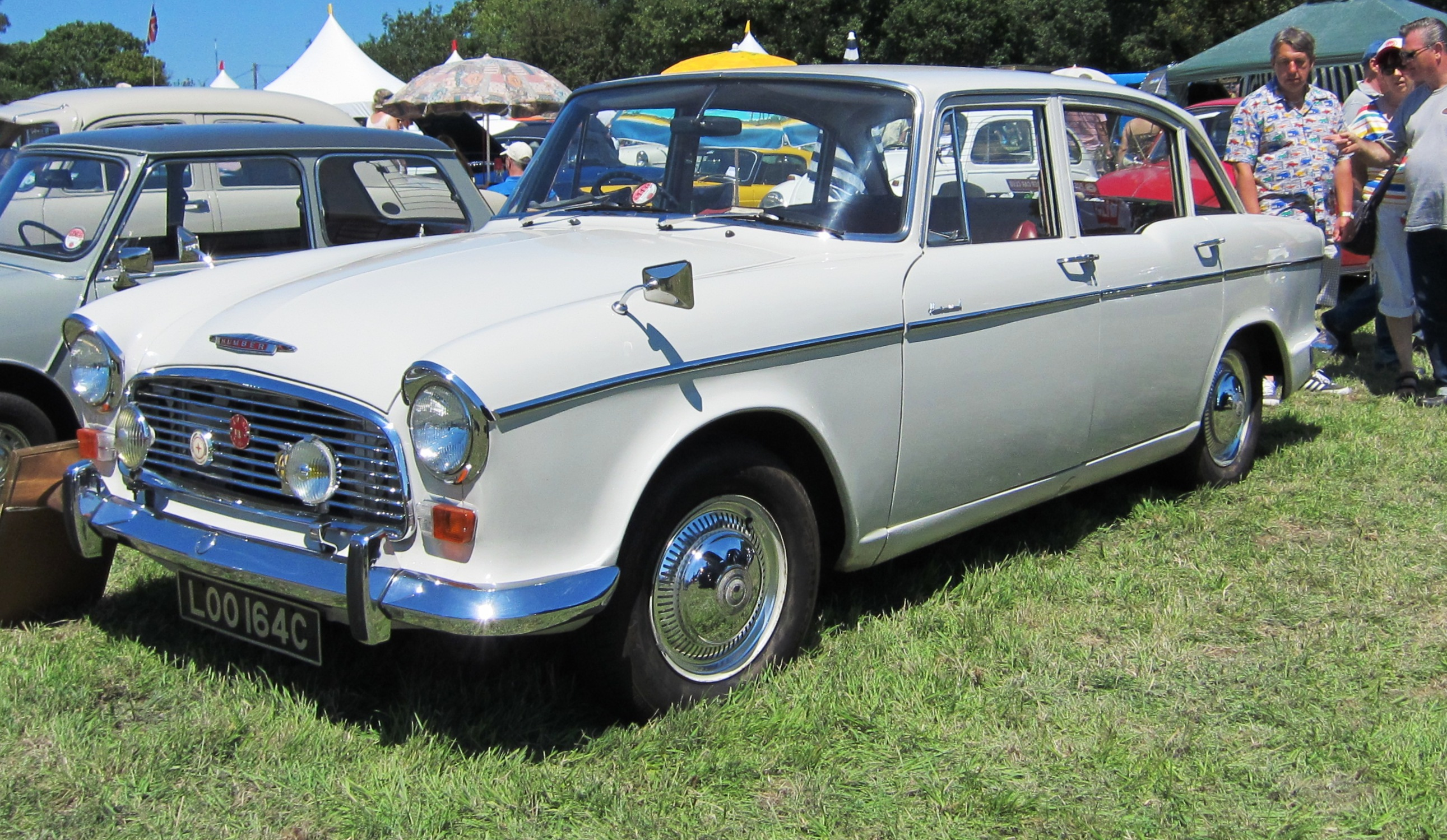
Hawk series IV 1965

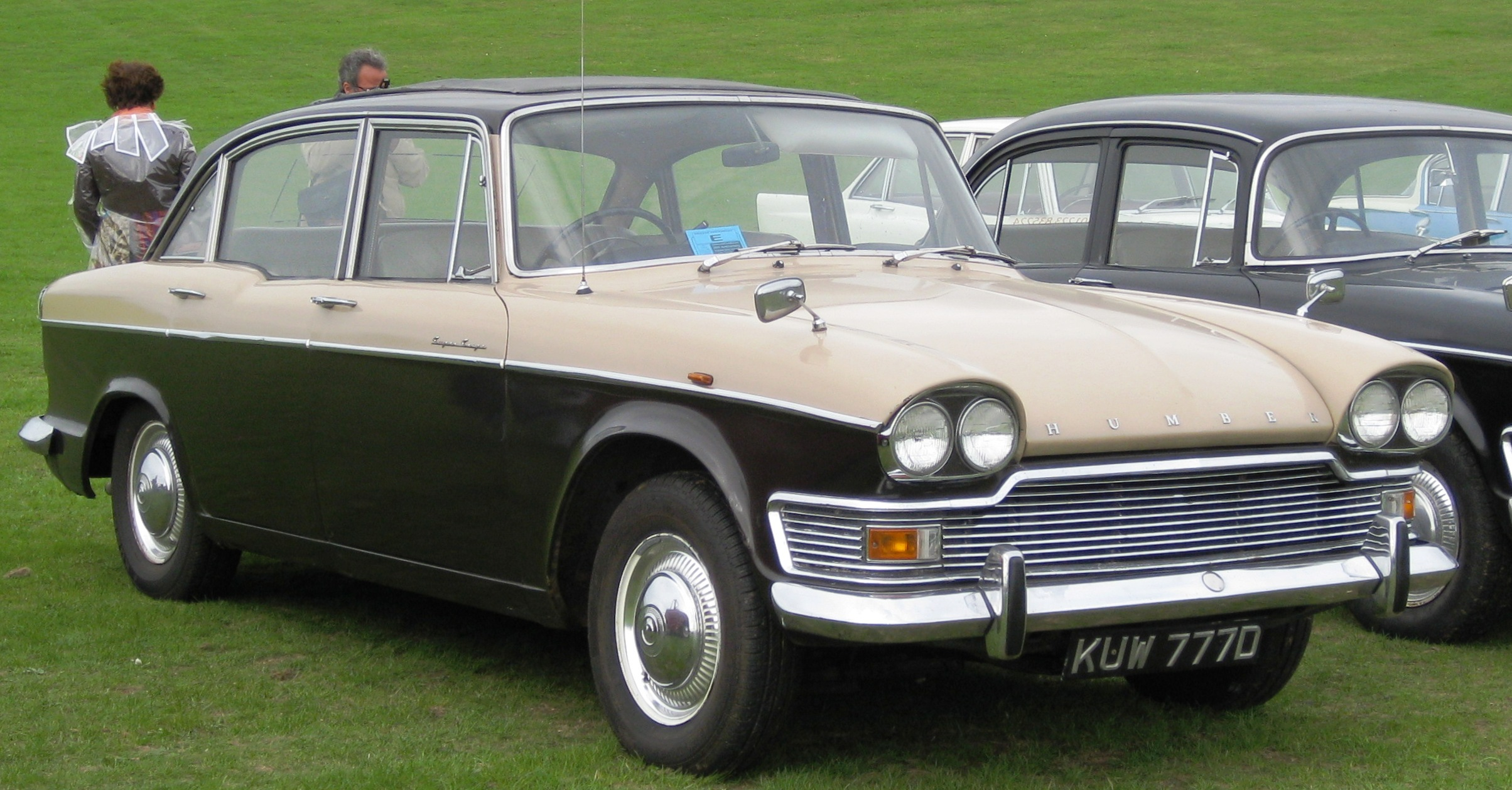
Super Snipe series V 1966

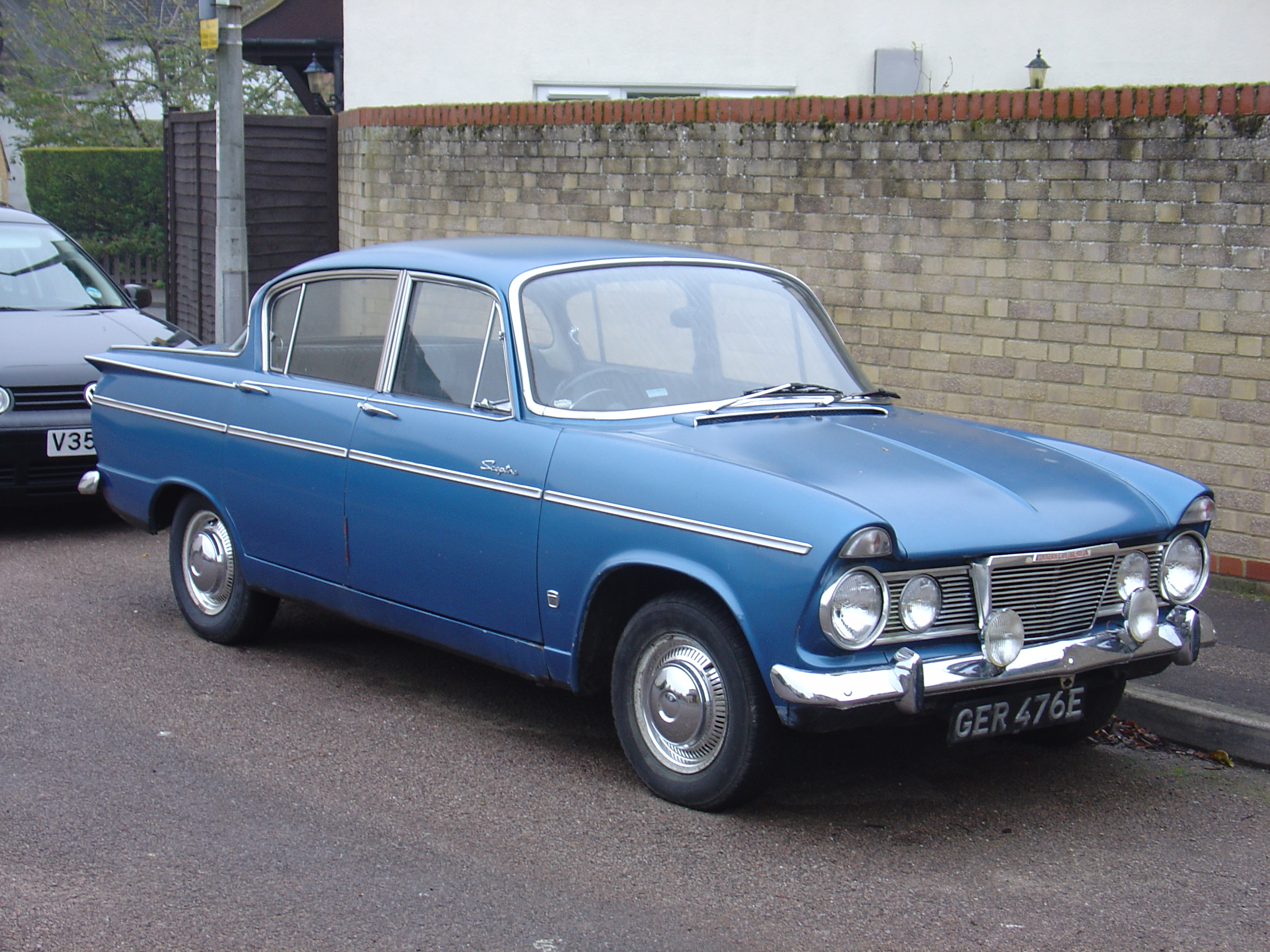
Sceptre 1967

Later Michael Sedgwick would describe the events of this era as "a levelling process comparable to the fate of Wolseley" ('s 1920s cars). Out, he said, went uncertain braking, the i.o.e. engine and superbly finished coachwork, the new cars were pure Rootes with Bendix brakes, downdraught carburettors, "silent third" gearboxes with central gear lever and hydraulic shock absorbers. The 16 hp car could cope with the Humber Snipe bodywork only with a low final drive ratio. The other cars also became slightly bigger Hillmans with different engines and a longer wheelbase. A Humber Twelve was introduced that looked like a Hillman Minx with a painted spare wheel cover and hinged quarter lights. There was attractive work by independent coachbuilders on the Twelve chassis. The Vogue sports saloon may or may not have been designed by couturier Captain Molyneux. The Twelve's engine was bored out to 75 mm and powered Hillman's Fourteen and even Sunbeam-Talbot's postwar 90. By the outbreak of war in 1939 the quite fast big-engined Super Snipe with hydraulic brakes was selling well and one model became the Army's famous second world war staff car.

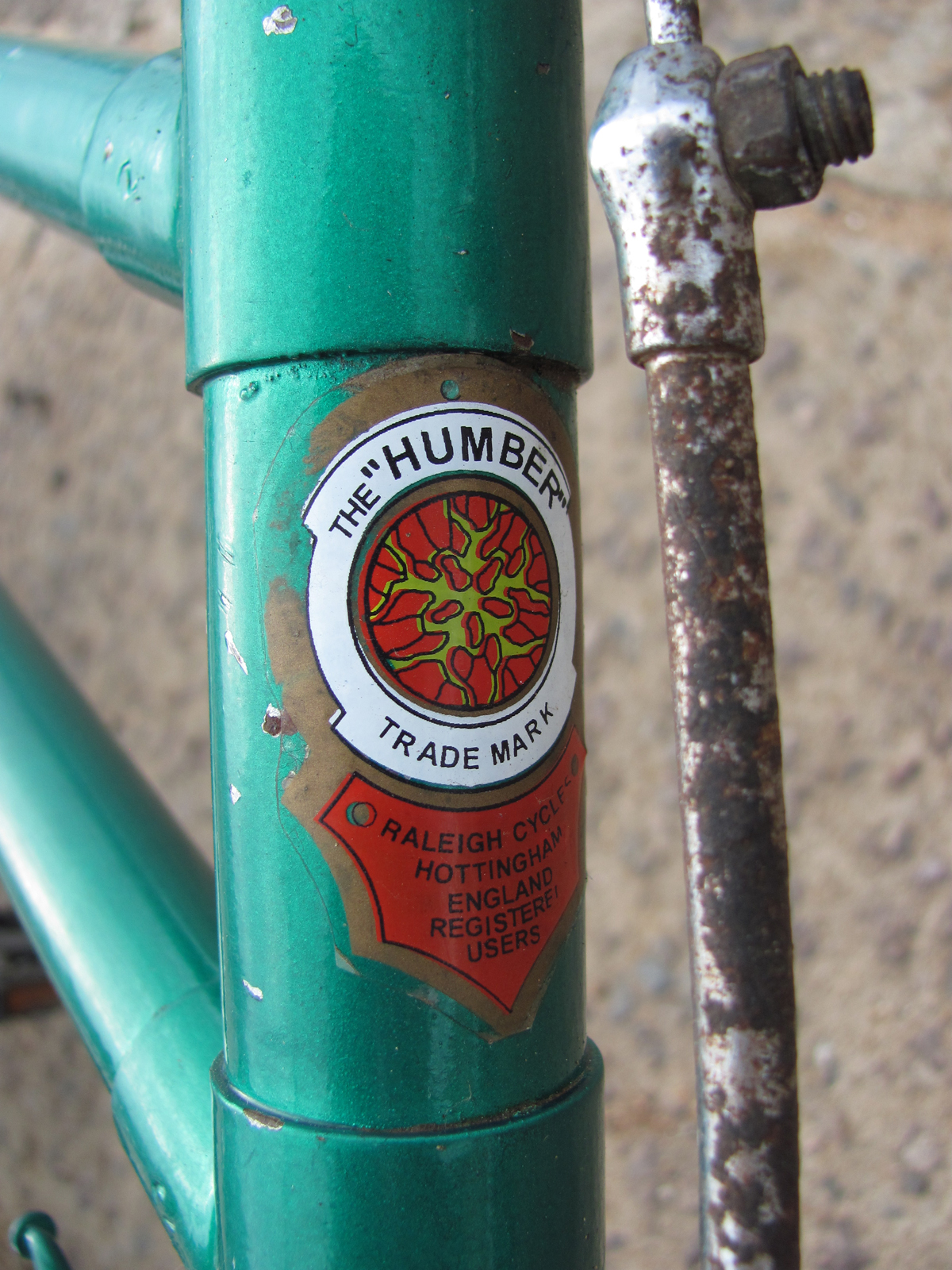
Humber trademark Raleigh-made cycle

==== Rootes brothers and Prudential buy sixty per cent of Humber ====
Humber's independence ended in 1931 when the Rootes brothers bought a majority shareholding with the financial support of Prudential Assurance. They provided their Hillman shares as part payment.

Humber cycles

There was a resurgence in domestic and export demand for pedal bicycles and in February 1932 Raleigh acquired all the Humber cycles trade marks. Manufacture was transferred to Raleigh's Nottingham works. Raleigh-made Humbers differed from Raleighs only in chainwheels, fork crowns and some brakework.

=== 1939–1945 ===
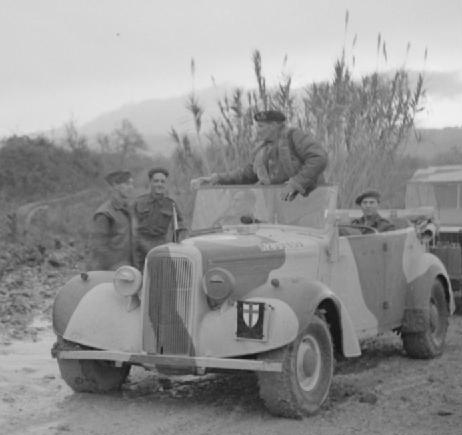
Staff car Montgomery Italy 1943

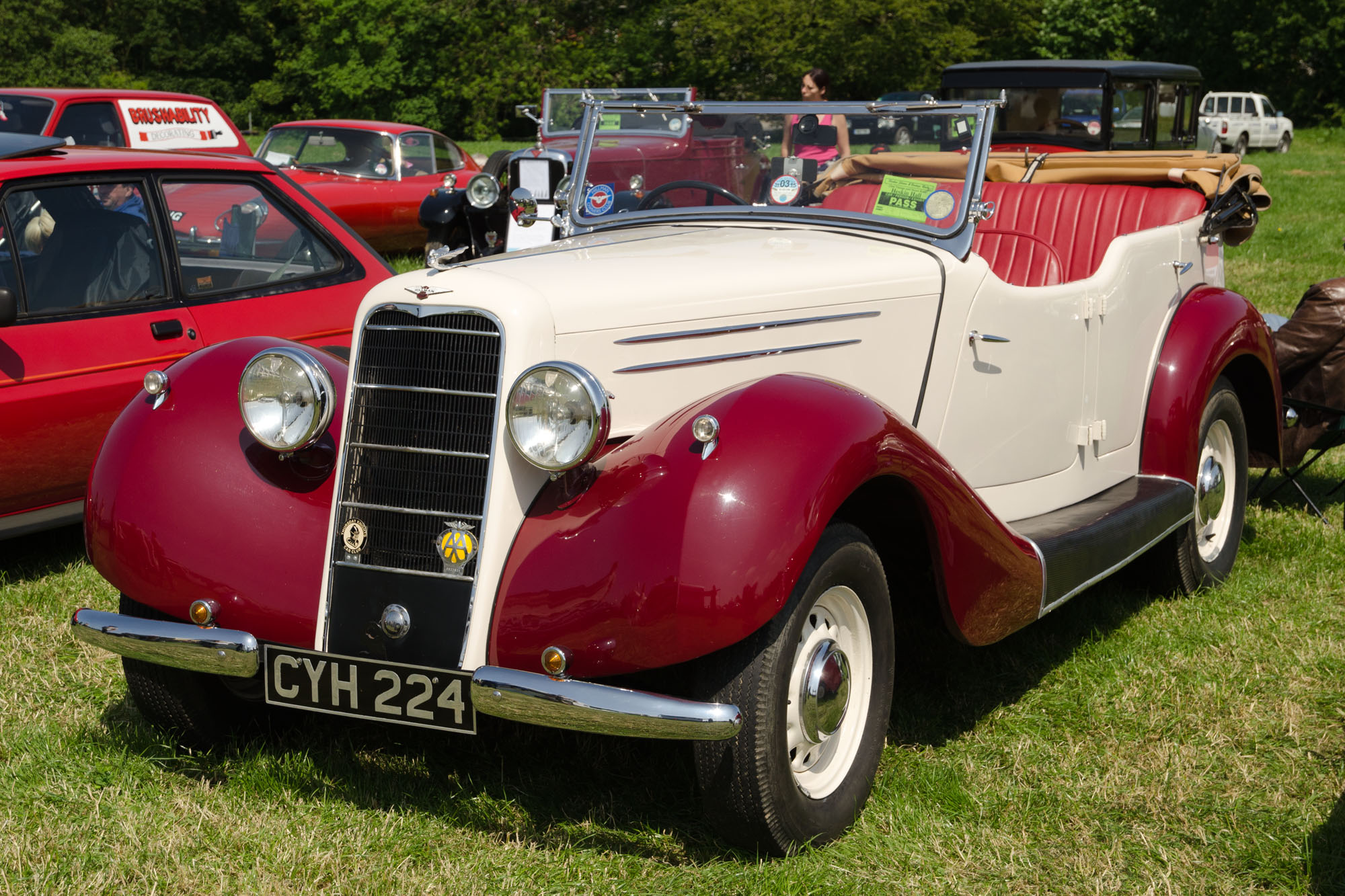
1936 Hillman Hawk 3.2-litre six-cylinder with running boards, no helmet-shaped front mudguards

The Ryton on Dunsmore plant which closed at the end of 2006 had originated in 1939 as one of the so-called shadow factories: the Ryton plant was originally built to produce aero engines. At Speke, Liverpool, another shadow factory opened in April 1939 assembled bombers. Armoured cars, scout cars and staff cars were made in the existing factories along with much other war material

General Montgomery, Commander of the British and Allied forces in Northern Africa during the Desert war of World War II, had two specially built Humber Super Snipe four door open tourers made with larger front wings or guards, mine proof floors, special fittings and long range fuel tanks. Two cars were built for him and used in the Africa campaign against General Rommel, who used a Horch open staff car. Montgomery's Humbers were known as 'Old Faithful' and the 'Victory Car'. Both cars still exist in museums in England and are a testament to the high engineering and manufacturing standards of Humber and Rootes Ltd. The victory car drove Montgomery and Churchill through the streets of London during the VE parades at the end of the war.

=== Military vehicles ===
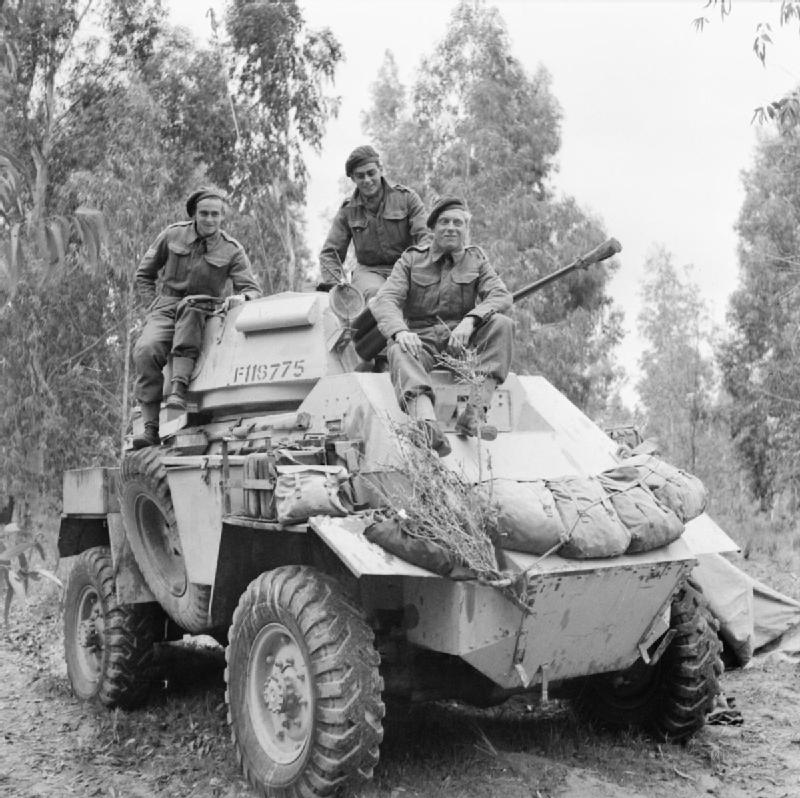
Humber Armoured Car, Tripoli 1943

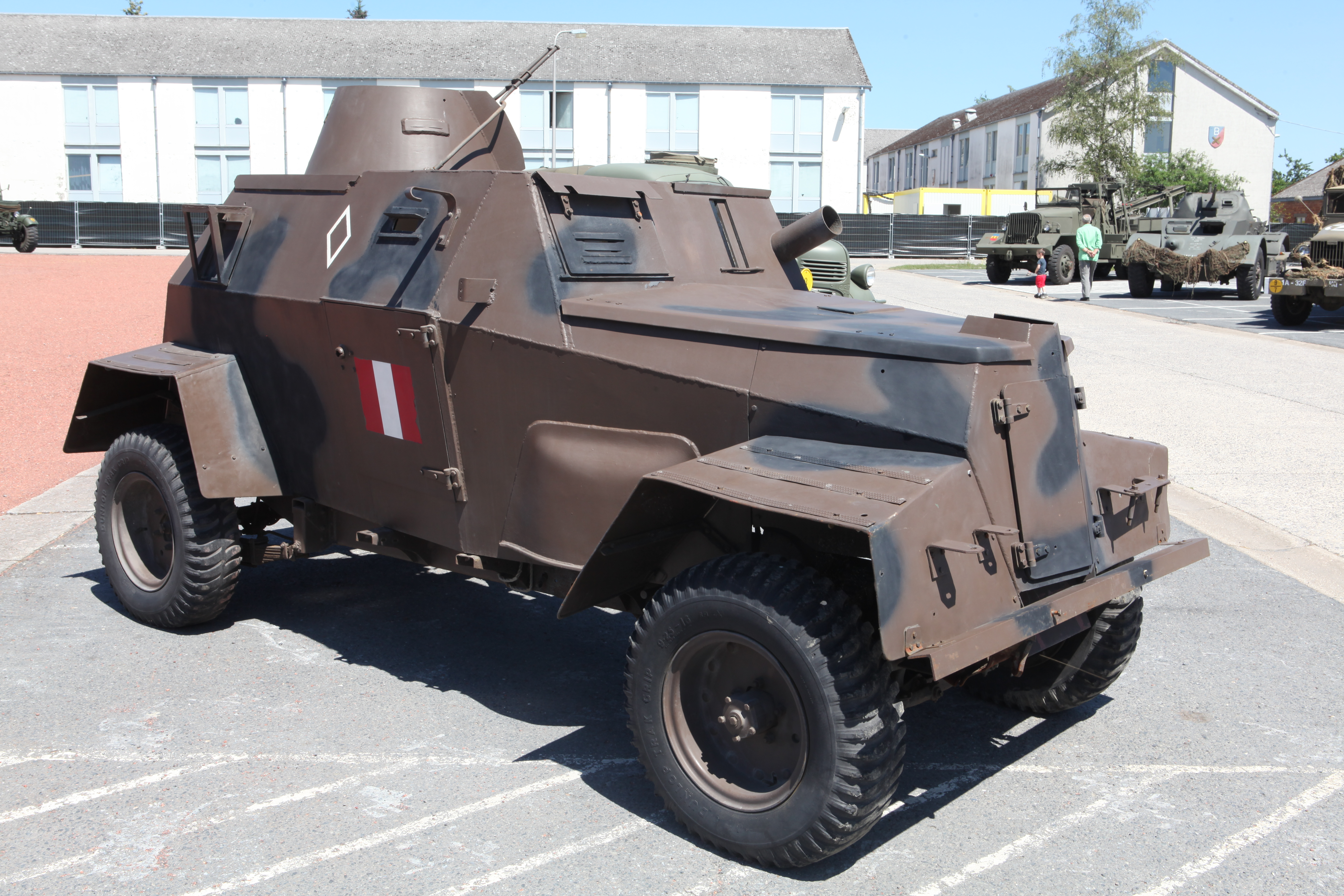
Light Reconnaissance Car

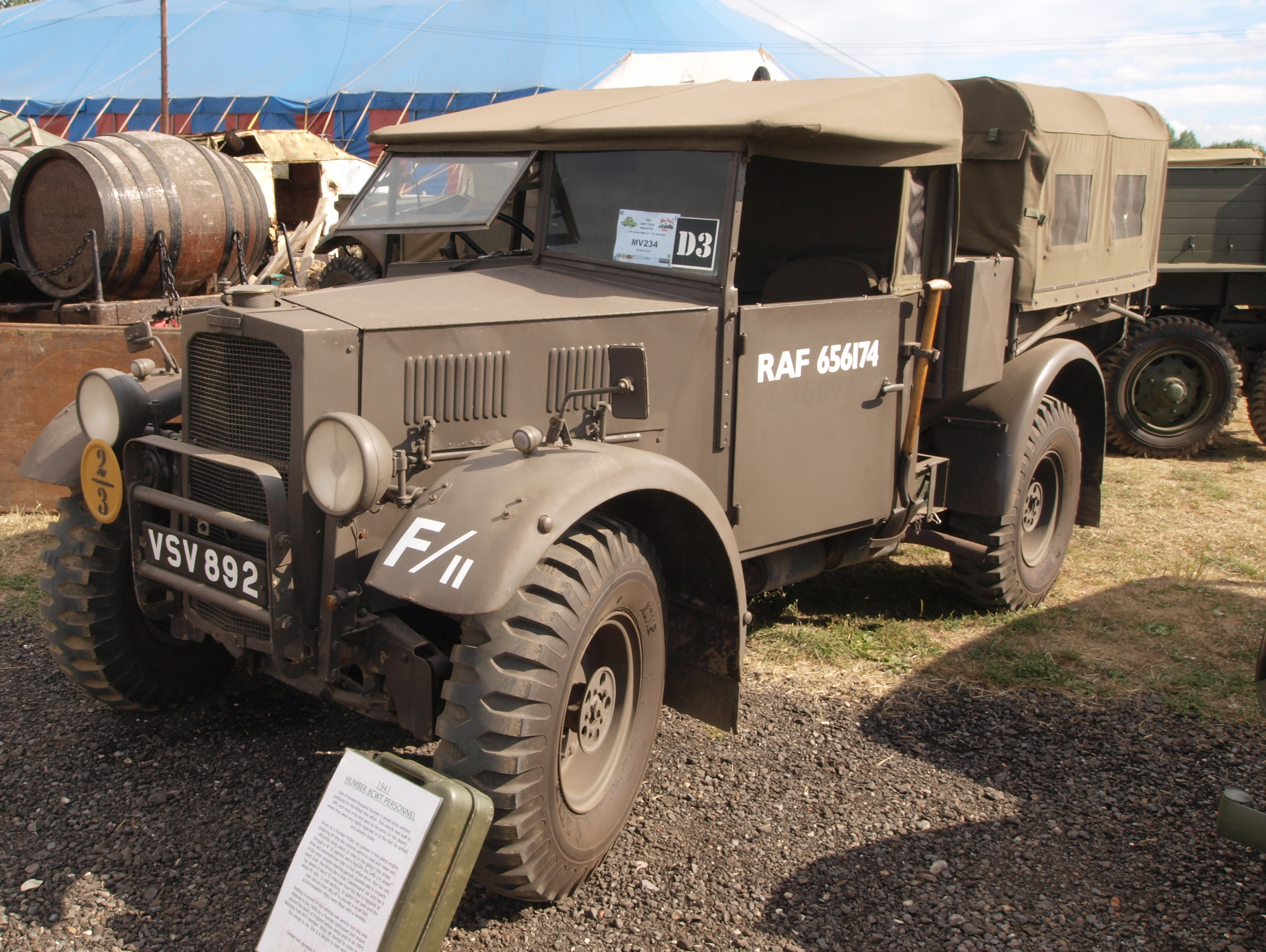
Humber 8cwt

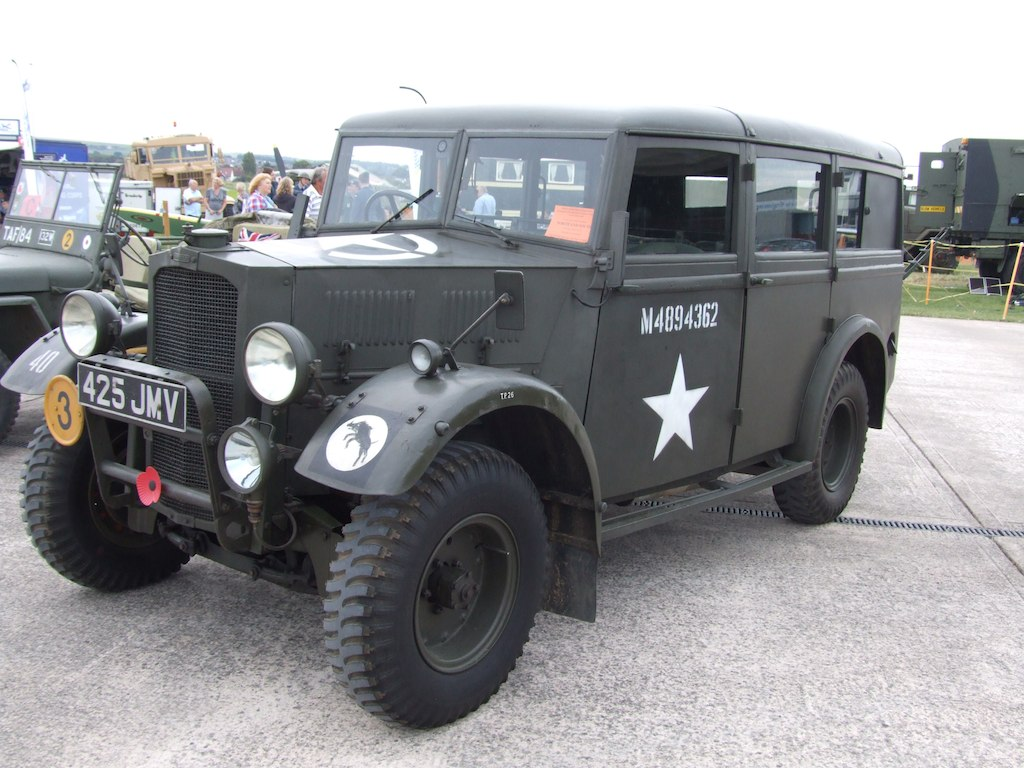
Heavy Utility

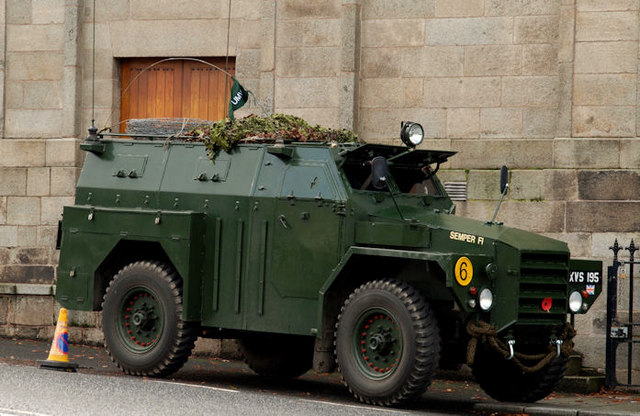
FV 1601 "Pig"

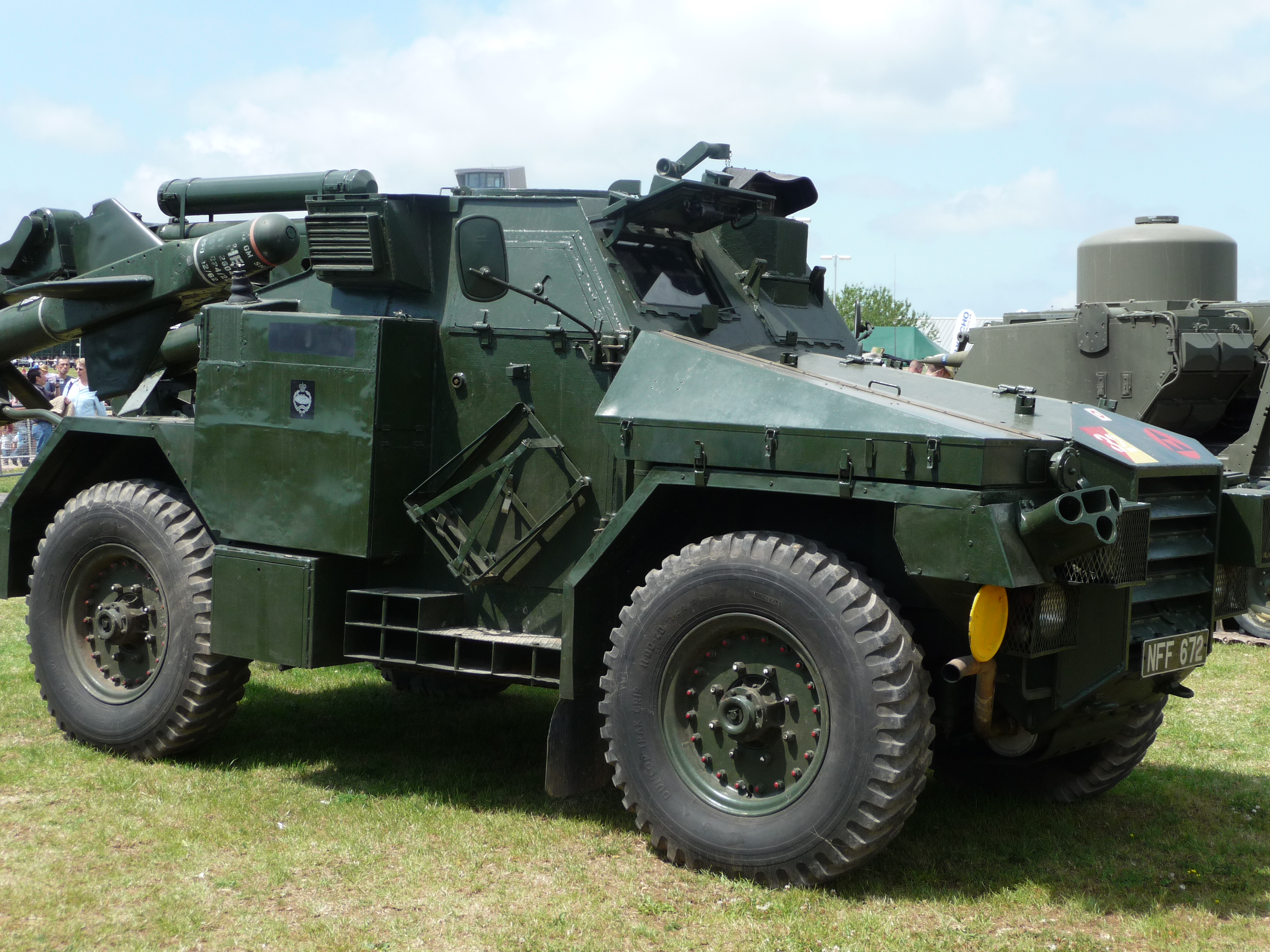
FV 1620 Hornet

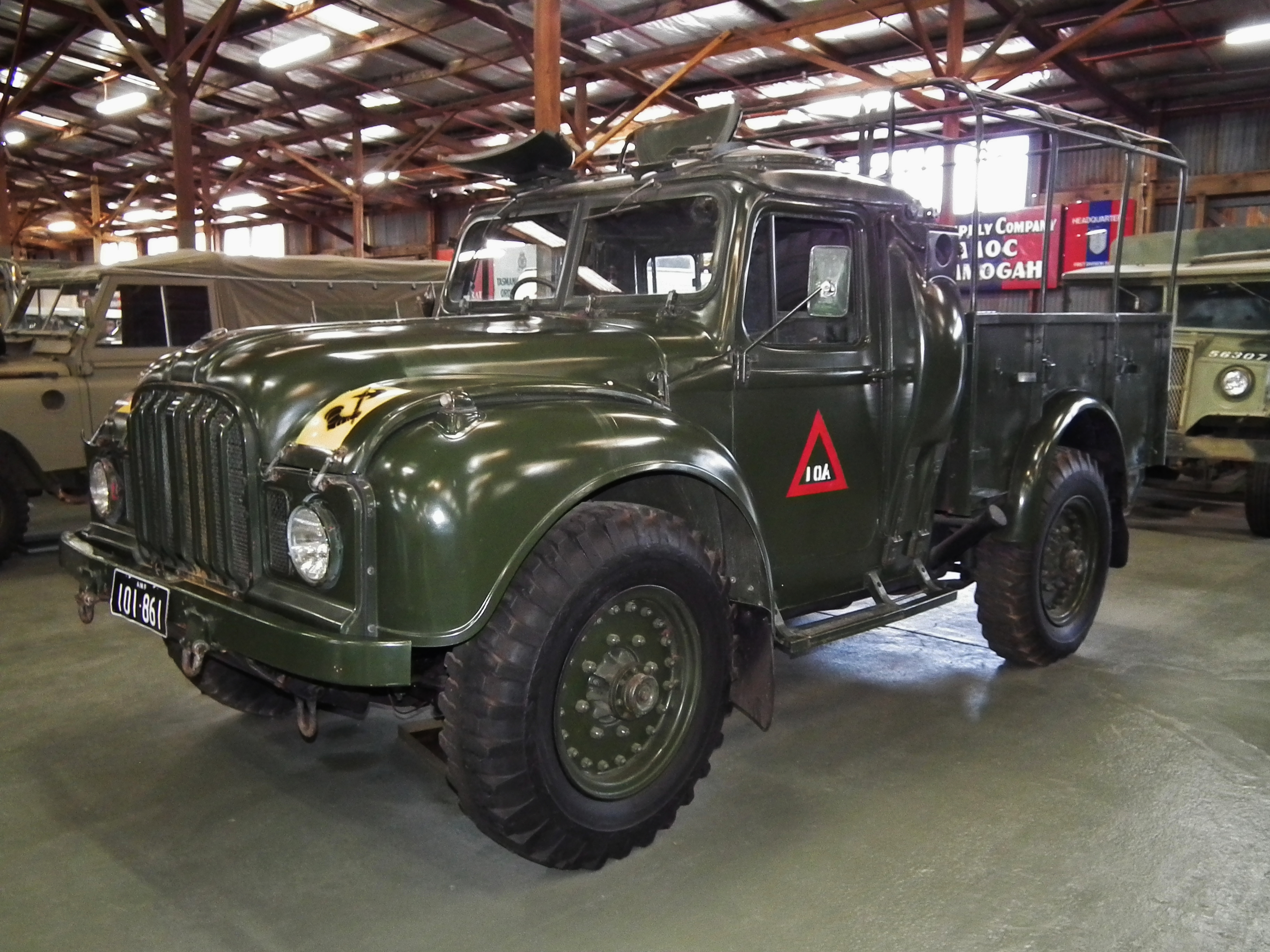
FV 1600 1 ton truck

==== Annual vehicle production ====
- 1929-30: 9,000 vehicles
- 1933-34: 20,000
- 1937-39: 41,000
- 1946-47: 42,000
- 1949-50: 90,000

=== 1945–1967 ===
In the postwar era, Humber's mainstay products included the four-cylinder Hawk and six-cylinder Super Snipe. Being a choice of businessmen and officialdom alike, Humbers gained a reputation for well appointed interiors and solid quality. The Hawk and the Super Snipe went through various designs, though all had a "transatlantic" influence.

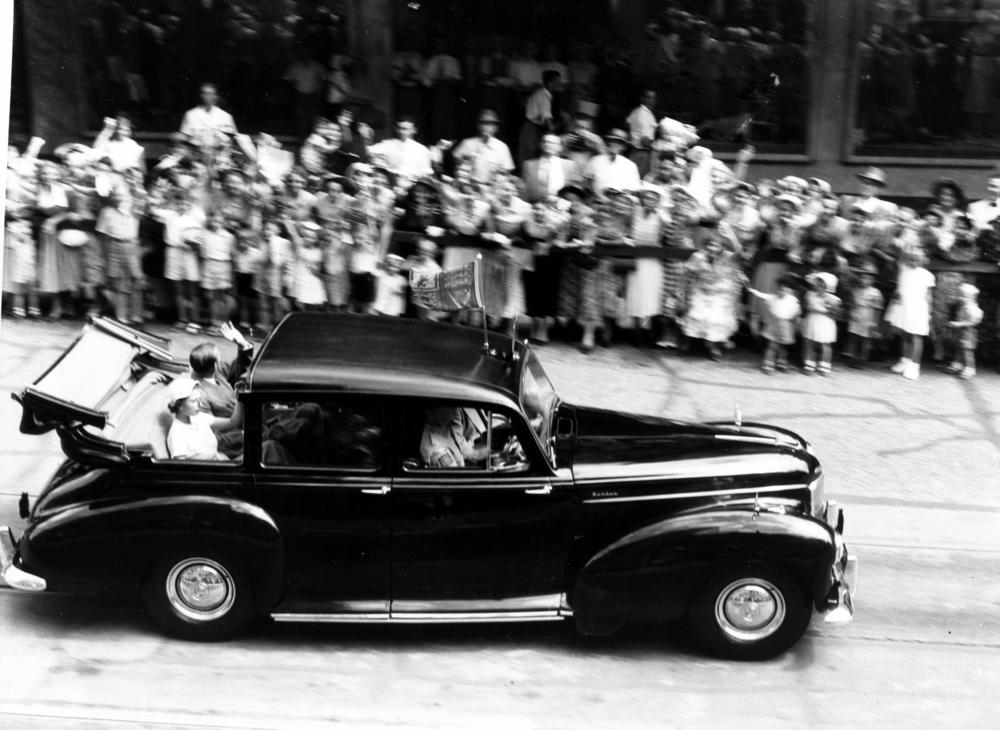
Pullman Landaulette Brisbane 1954

Annual output, 200,000 vehicles

In 1960 Rootes was the world's twelfth largest motor corporation by volume, its annual output nearly 200,000 cars, vans and trucks. They employed some 20,000 people. The group had six million square feet (557,000m^{2}) of manufacturing space and owned nine assembly plants outside Britain. They were involved in car hire, hire purchase and driving schools and even made air conditioners. There were about one thousand dealers in the UK. The two Rootes brothers remained in control of their group from their adjoining suites of offices in Devonshire House, Piccadilly. The ground floor Rootes showroom on Piccadilly is now an Audi showroom.

Imp and Chrysler

The success of BMC's Mini made Rootes speed the development of their own small car. A new assembly plant was planned but government was obliging major employers to build new plants where there was surplus labour. Jaguar solved their expansion problem by buying Daimler and its Coventry plant with experienced workforce but Rootes selected a greenfield site by Pressed Steel body works near Glasgow airport in Scotland, at Linwood near Paisley. The new factory was officially opened in May 1963 and the new rear-engined Hillman Imp went on sale the next day but there were difficulties with industrial relations and, soon, the Imp's reliability. The Imp's heavy development expenses and slackening sales to USA brought about losses for the Rootes group in both 1962 and 1963.

In February 1964 the owners of the minority holdings in Humber Limited (and Tilling-Stevens and Singer Motors) sold their holdings to Rootes Motors Limited taking in exchange shares in Rootes Motors. Humber and its two subsidiaries now became wholly owned subsidiaries of Rootes Motors Limited.

A last major activity of, by then, Lord Rootes, was to open sale negotiations with Chrysler Corporation. He died in December 1964. Chrysler took control in 1967.

=== 1967–1976 ===
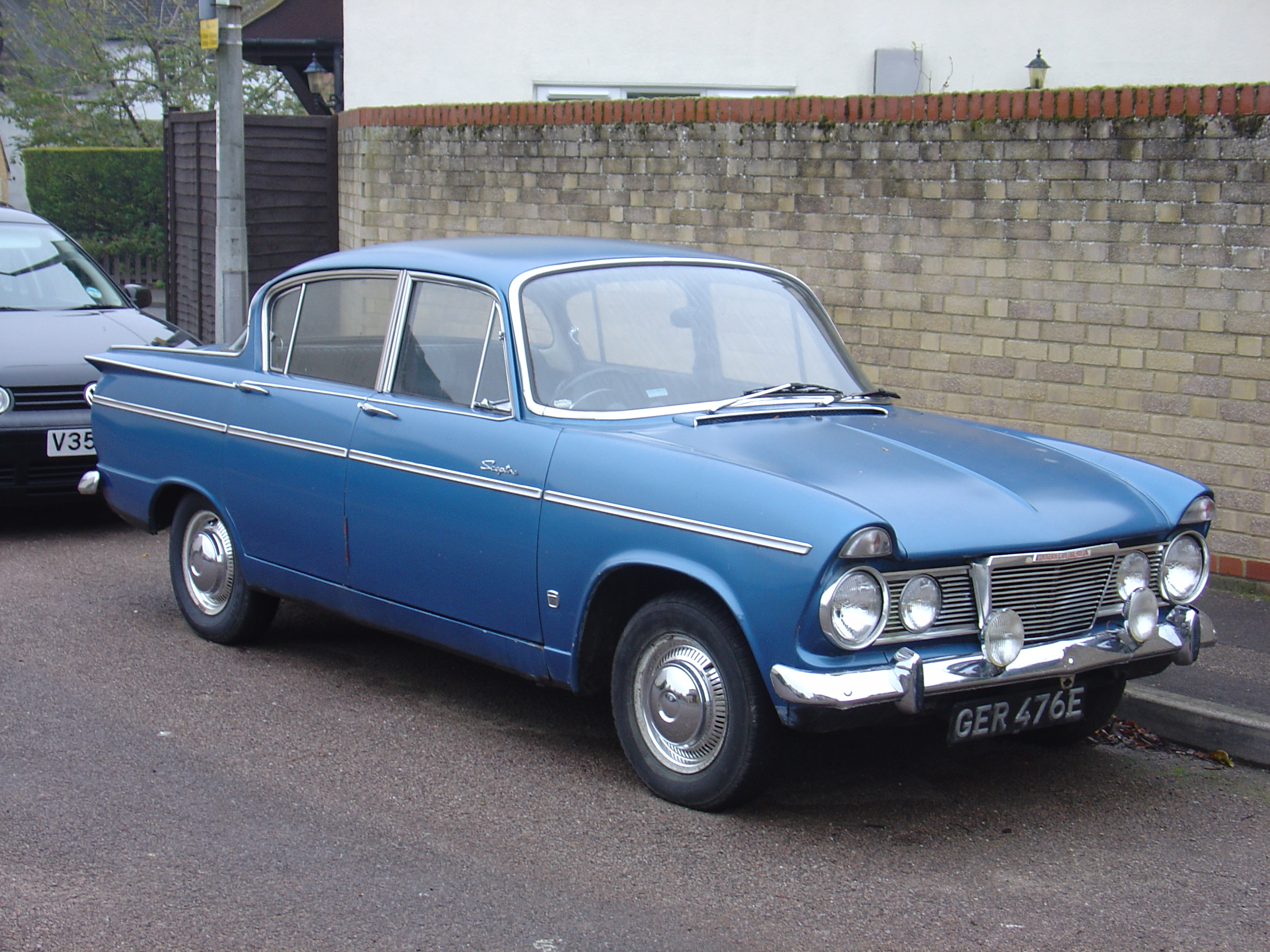
Sceptre 1967

The last of the traditional large Humbers, the series VA Super Snipe (fitted with twin Stromberg CD 100 Carburettors) were sold in 1968, when Chrysler ended production. Several V8 models had been in pre-production at this time, but were never publicly sold. Several of these test examples survive today.

Humber's and Rootes' last new car was the second generation of Humber Sceptre, a variant of their Rootes Arrow model. The marque was shelved in 1976 when all Hillmans became badged Chryslers.

The Hillman Hunter (another Arrow model) badged Chrysler until production ceased in 1979 when Chrysler's European division was sold to Peugeot and the marque renamed Talbot. The Talbot marque was abandoned at the end of 1986 on passenger cars, although it was continued on vans for six years afterwards.

=== After 1976 ===
In 1986, there was a private initiative to rekindle Humber as a manufacturer of upmarket premium vehicles, employing the recently closed truck and tractor manufacturing facility at Bathgate, in Scotland. This factory had been opened by BMC in 1961, to manufacture their light trucks and tractors. The original plan had been to expand their Longbridge plant for this purpose. The trucks were later marketed as Leyland ‘Redline’

The unused company name of Humber, continued to be still maintained and registered by the new owner Peugeot. A different company, the Humber Motor Company Limited, was therefore incorporated and registered as a means of pursuing this manufacturing proposal. This proposal was vetoed by the local Bathgate councillors. They preferred the idea of a huge “Sales Mall” development on the site in Bathgate, rather than support an initiative that would have involved continued manufacturing employment in the area. The new retail idea was itself turned down by Edinburgh and Glasgow councils. Regrettably, all the Bathgate factory buildings were eventually flattened, and the site was ironically, subsequently, used merely as a distribution centre for a number of other automotive manufacturers.

Humber Motor Company Limited Limited was registered as a Scottish company in August 1986 then dissolved July 2007; 'Humber Motor Company Limited' was registered in England in June 2007.

On 07 JUN 2007, Humber Motor Company Limited took the opportunity to register in England the original Thomas Humber’s company name of HUMBER LIMITED (Number 6272014) [Citation: https://find-and-update.company-information.service.gov.uk/company/06272014/officers ].

Four of Humber Motor Company Limited's registered trademarks (Sceptre, Hawk, Super Snipe, Snipe) were renewed with the Intellectual Property Office (IPO). The Humber name and logo are also registered trademarks

On 03 APR 2026, IMPERIAL was included as a Registered Trade Mark of the Humber Motor Company Limited. [Citation: https://trademarks.ipo.gov.uk/ipo-tmcase/page/Results/1/UK00004320364 ]

There is a continuing interest in Humber and the vehicles that it produced. There are active web-pages frequented by the fans and owners of Humber vehicles.

== Main models ==
- Humber 8 1902
- Humber 12 1902
- Humber 20 1903
- Humberette Voiturette 1903–1911
- Humber 8/10 1905
- Humber 10/12 1905–1907
- Humber 30/40 1908–1909
- Humberette Cycle Car 1912–1915
- Humber 11 1912
- Humber 14 1914–1917

1919–1939

- Humber 10 1919–1921
- Humber 15.9 1919–1925
- Humber 11.4 and 12/25 1921–1925
- Humber 8/18 1922–1925
- Humber 15/40 1924–1928
- Humber 9/20 and 9/28 1925–1930
- Humber 14/40 1926–1929
- Humber 20/55 and 20/65 1926–1929

Rootes Brothers

- Humber 16/50 1928–1932
- Humber Snipe 1929–1947+
- Humber Pullman 1930–1954+
- Humber 16–60 1933–1935
- Humber 12 1933–1937
- Humber 16 1936–1940
- Humber Imperial 1938–1967+
- Humber Super Snipe 1938–1967+

1945–1967

- Humber Snipe 1929–1947
- Humber Pullman 1930–1954
- Humber Super Snipe 1938–1967
- Humber Imperial 1938–1967
- Humber Hawk 1945–1967
- Humber Sceptre 1961–1967,1967–1976
- Humber Vogue 1963–1966 (Australia)

== Surviving cars ==
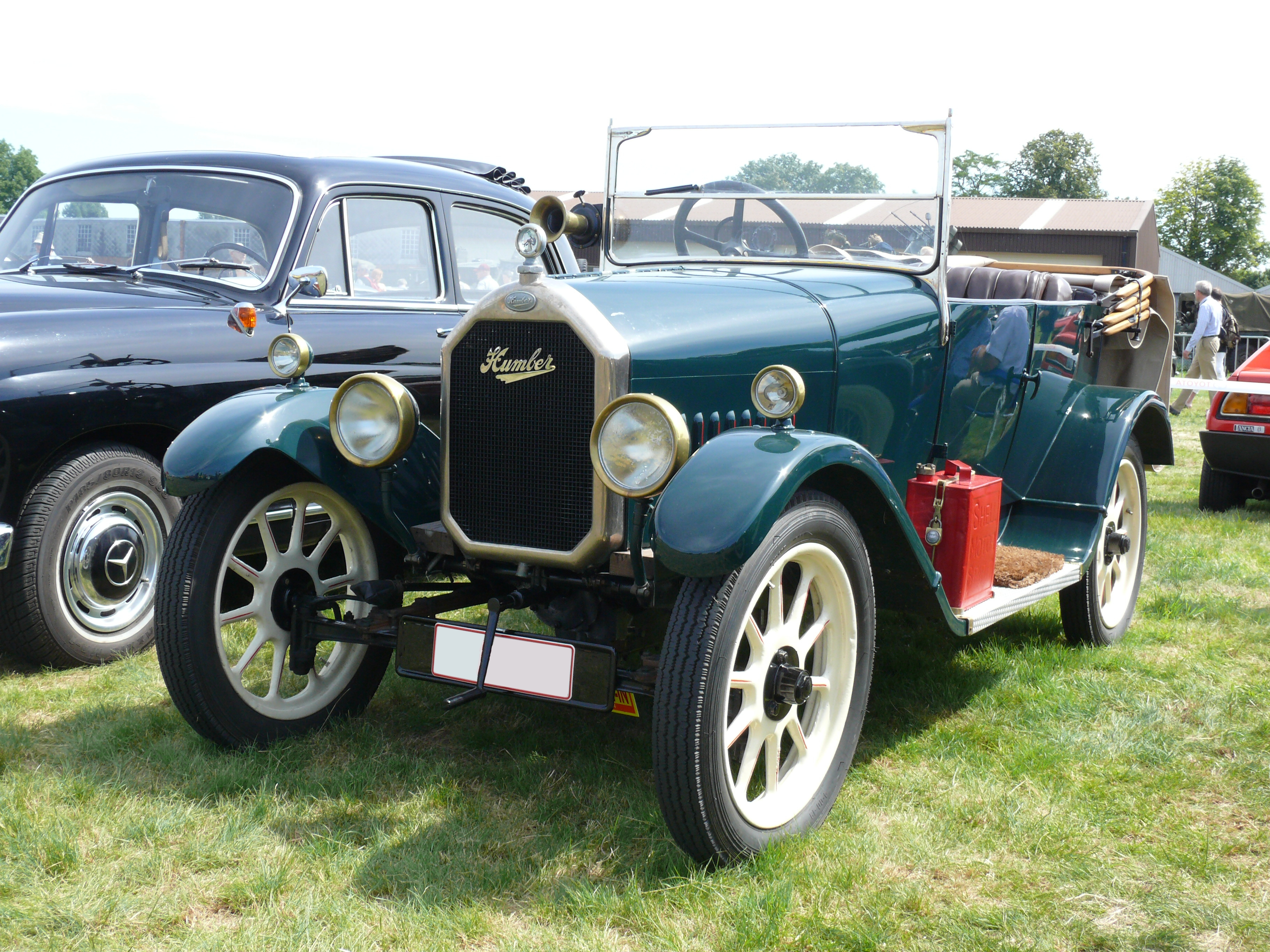
1924 8/18 In their book The Vintage Motor Car described as among "the three most charming small cars ever made"

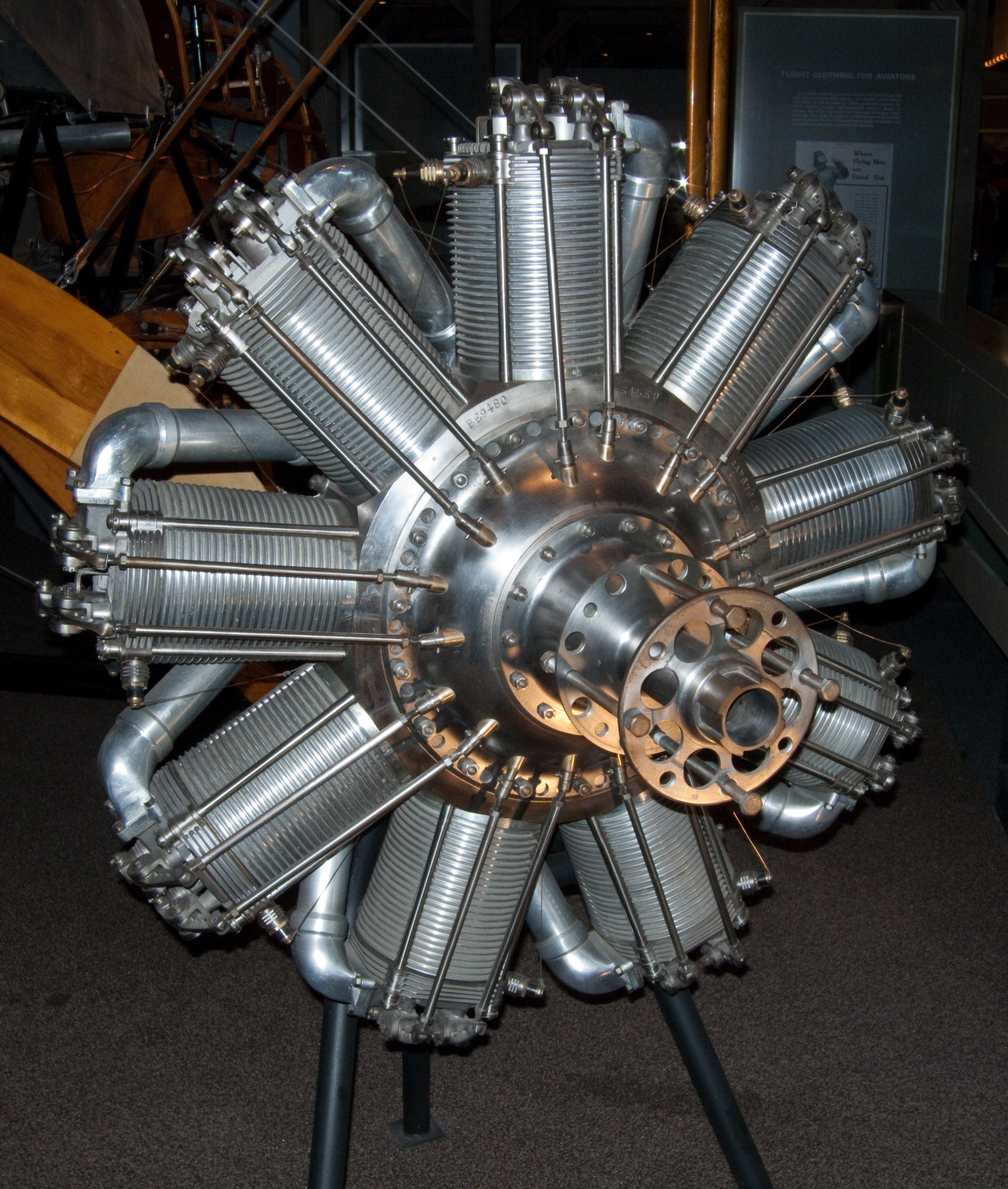
Bentley BR2 rotary aeroengine, designed by W. O. Bentley; used on Sopwith Snipe and some prototype aircraft

There is a thriving club, and many of these upmarket cars survive today from before the 1930s.

Until 2020, the world's largest collection of the Rootes brothers' Humber cars (built after 1930) could be viewed at the Marshalls Post-Vintage Humber Car Museum in Hull. It included 21 Humber cars dating from 1932 to 1970 on permanent display, plus 24 unrestored cars. The museum has now closed for good and many of the cars have been sold off.

== Aviation ==
Humber produced a number of aircraft and aero-engines in the years before the First World War. In 1909 the company signed a contract to build 40 copies of the Blériot XI monoplane, powered by their own three-cylinder engine, and four aircraft were exhibited at the Aero Show at Olympia in 1910.

During the First World War Humber built the BR1 and BR2 engines designed for Humber by W O Bentley and more engines were built in different factories in Coventry for the Air Ministry during the Second World War.

== See also ==
- Humber cycles
- Humber motorcycles
- List of car manufacturers of the United Kingdom
