= Talbot =

French automotive brand of various corporations

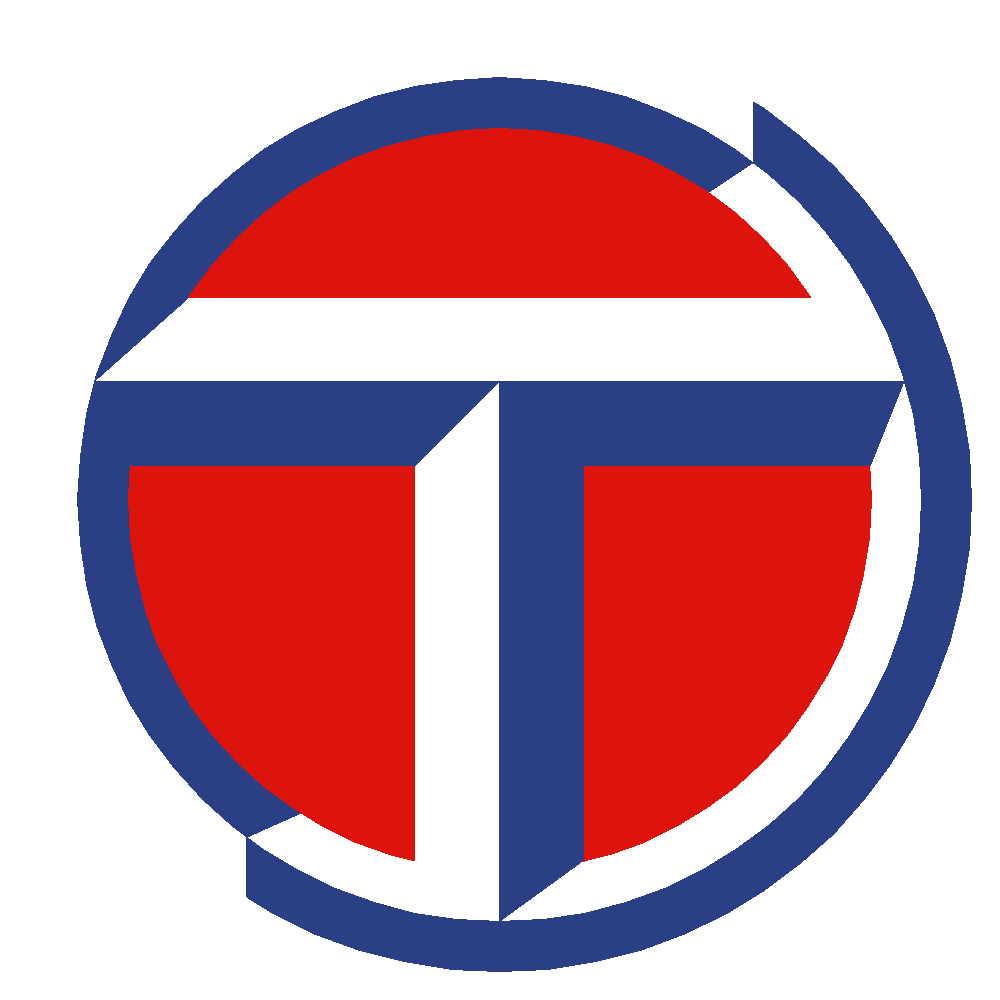
- Product type: Automobile
- Current owner: Stellantis
- Country: UK
- Introduced: 1903
- Discontinued: 1995; 31 years ago
- Markets: Europe
- Previous owners: Clément-Talbot (1903–19); Darracq (1919–35); Rootes Group (1938–67); Chrysler Europe (1967–78); PSA Group (1978–2021)

Talbot is a dormant automobile marque introduced in 1902 by British-French company Clément-Talbot. The founders, Charles Chetwynd-Talbot, 20th Earl of Shrewsbury and Adolphe Clément-Bayard, reduced their financial interests in their Clément-Talbot business during the First World War.

Soon after the end of the war, Clément-Talbot was brought into an Anglo-French combine named STD Motors (Sunbeam, Talbot and Darracq). Shortly afterward, STD Motors' French products were renamed Talbot instead of Darracq.

In the mid-1930s, with the collapse of STD Motors, Rootes bought the London Talbot factory, and Antonio Lago bought the Paris Talbot factory, where Lago produced vehicles under the marques Talbot and Talbot-Lago. Rootes renamed Clément-Talbot Sunbeam-Talbot in 1938 and stopped using the Talbot brand name in the mid-1950s. The Paris factory closed a few years later.

Ownership of the marque – which through a convoluted series of takeovers saw it exist in two different forms by both the Rootes Group and Simca – and with both these companies coming under the ownership of Chrysler Corporation in the 1960s, it eventually fell into the ownership of PSA Peugeot Citroën after it acquired the ailing Chrysler Europe from its American parent in 1978. PSA revived the use of the Talbot marque from 1979 until 1994; applying it to the former Chrysler Europe products.

The rights to the Talbot marque are presently owned by Groupe PSA's successor, Stellantis.

== Talbot London ==
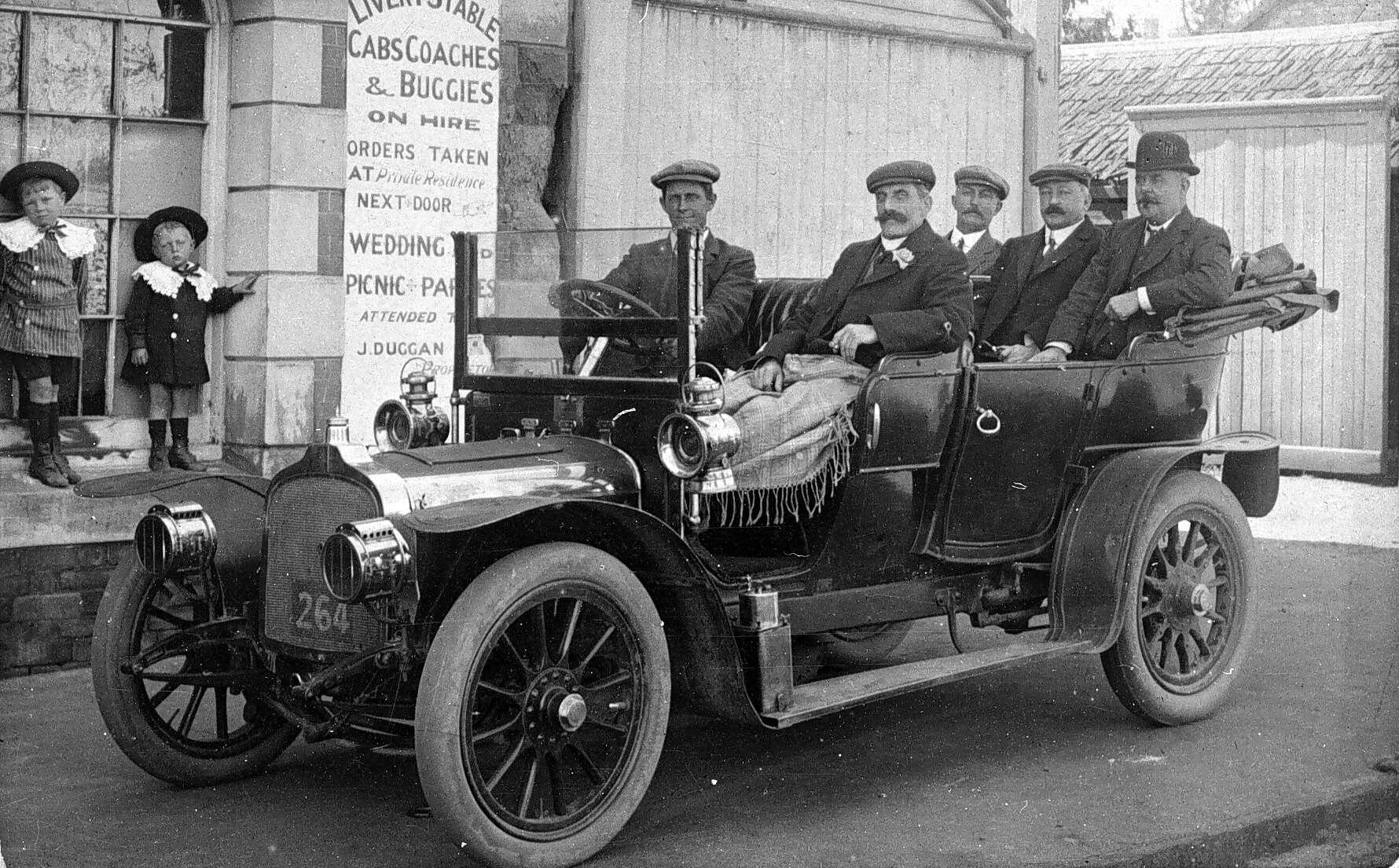
Adolphus Verey (c. 1911) Gentlemen's Motoring Party in a Talbot outside Duggan's Livery Stables, Castlemaine, Victoria

Clément-Talbot was founded in 1903. The first products were cars that were London-assembled mechanical components of French Clément-Bayard cars but the French components were soon replaced by British parts. The brand-name was reduced to Talbot after the first year.

=== STD Motors ===
In December 1919, Darracq of London with its factory in Suresnes, Paris, bought the entire capital of Clément-Talbot and later bought Sunbeam and renamed itself STD Motors. Those initials referred to Sunbeam, Talbot and Darracq. But in the depth of the Great Depression, STD Motors became unable to pay its debts. Its subsidiaries managed to find buyers and in 1936 STD Motors ceased to exist.

=== Talbot London under STD Motors ===
Clément-Talbot continued to be known for the design and quality of its products and it remained profitable during the depression. Clément-Talbot was bought by Rootes Group and later renamed Sunbeam-Talbot. Then Sunbeam alone twenty years after that.

=== Talbot Paris under STD Motors ===
In 1920, Suresnes products were branded Talbot-Darracq but the word Darracq was dropped in 1922. If exported to England Paris-made Talbots were rebadged Darracq or Talbot-Darracq.

Dragged down by the 1924 borrowing to pay for the Sunbeam racing programme, STD Motors and Automobiles Talbot France suffered a financial collapse in late 1934.

=== Talbot London under the Rootes brothers ===
Following the financial collapse of its parent, STD Motors, Clément-Talbot remained financially sound with readily marketable products. Clément-Talbot was bought by Rootes Securities and continued to manufacture the same catalogue of vehicles quietly introducing components from Hillman and Humber cars. As the genuine Talbot parts bins emptied, a modified Hillman Aero Minx was introduced to the production line and given the Talbot brand name.

== Talbot Paris under Antonio Lago ==
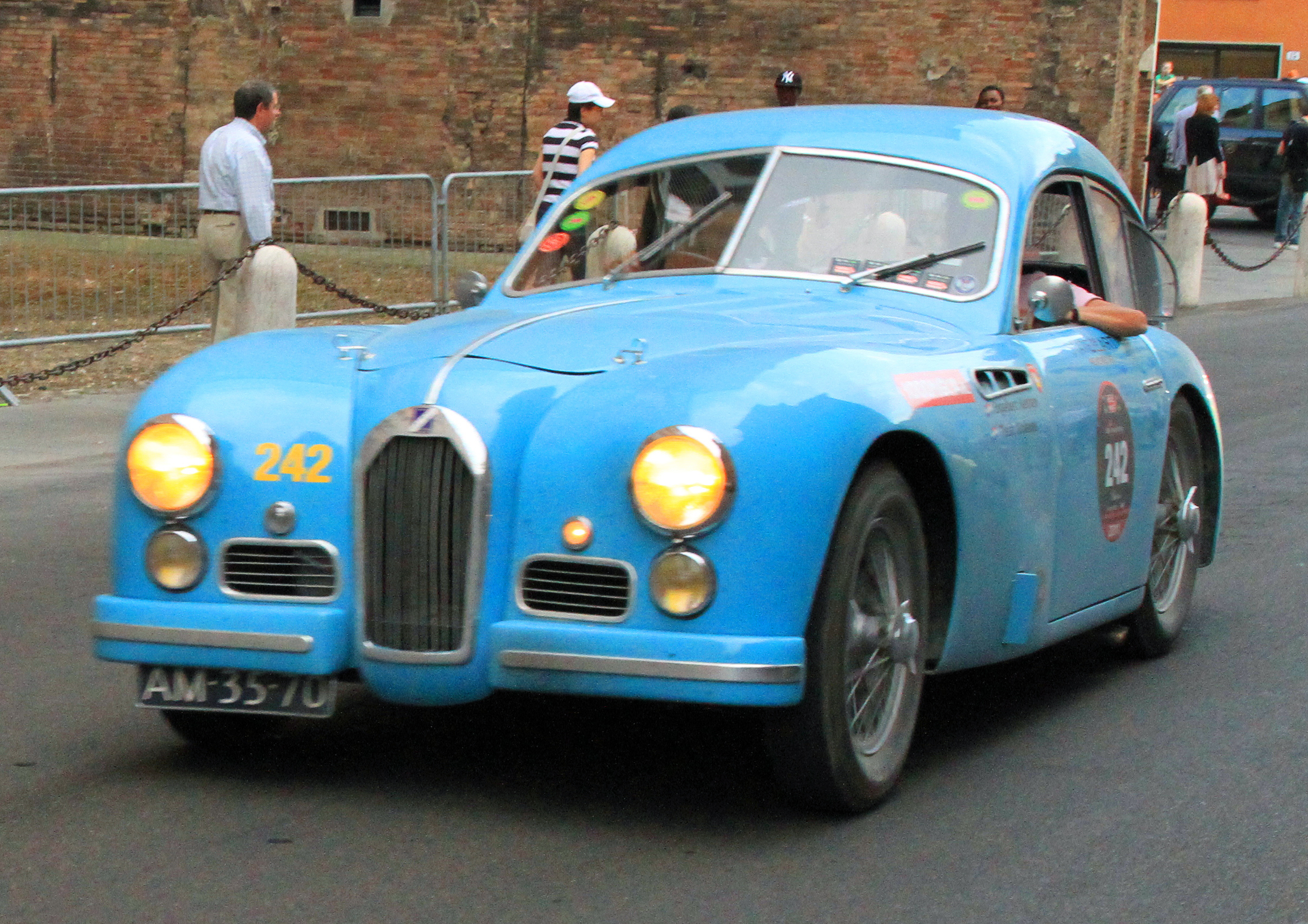
1950 Lago T26 Grand Sport

Following the financial collapse of STD Motors and Paris's Automobiles Talbot, Antonio Lago, the Suresnes' manager, arranged a management buyout of the French operation.

Antonio Lago involved Talbot in sports car and Grand Prix racing as well as producing high quality luxury cars. In the postwar world of austerity the French government introduced punitive annual taxation on cars with engines larger than 2.6-litres and Talbot sales were severely restricted. Lago continued the Talbot business until 1958 when the factory doors were closed.

The dormant Talbot marque was sold to Simca. Simca was gradually acquired by Chrysler Corporation between 1963 and 1970 – which effectively brought the two Talbot brands together since Chrysler Europe already owned the Rootes Group. PSA Peugeot Citroën acquired the still dormant Talbot marque when it bought Chrysler in 1978. PSA Peugeot Citroën began to use a Talbot badge on former Simca and Chrysler/Rootes models.

== Chrysler/Peugeot era (1979–1985) ==
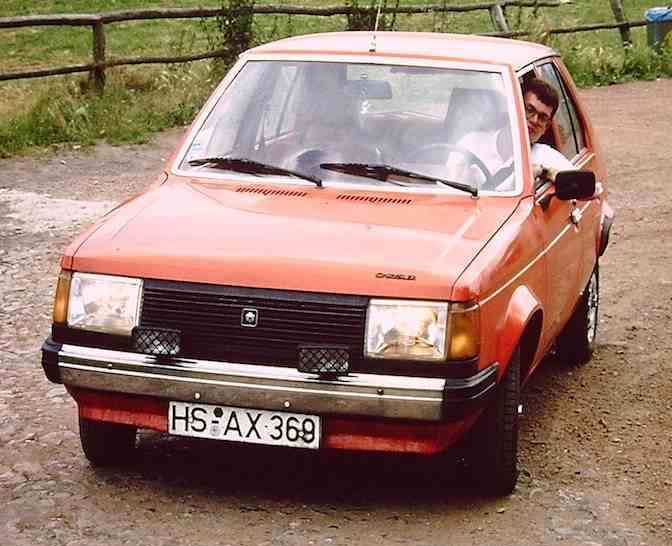
1978 Horizon saloon

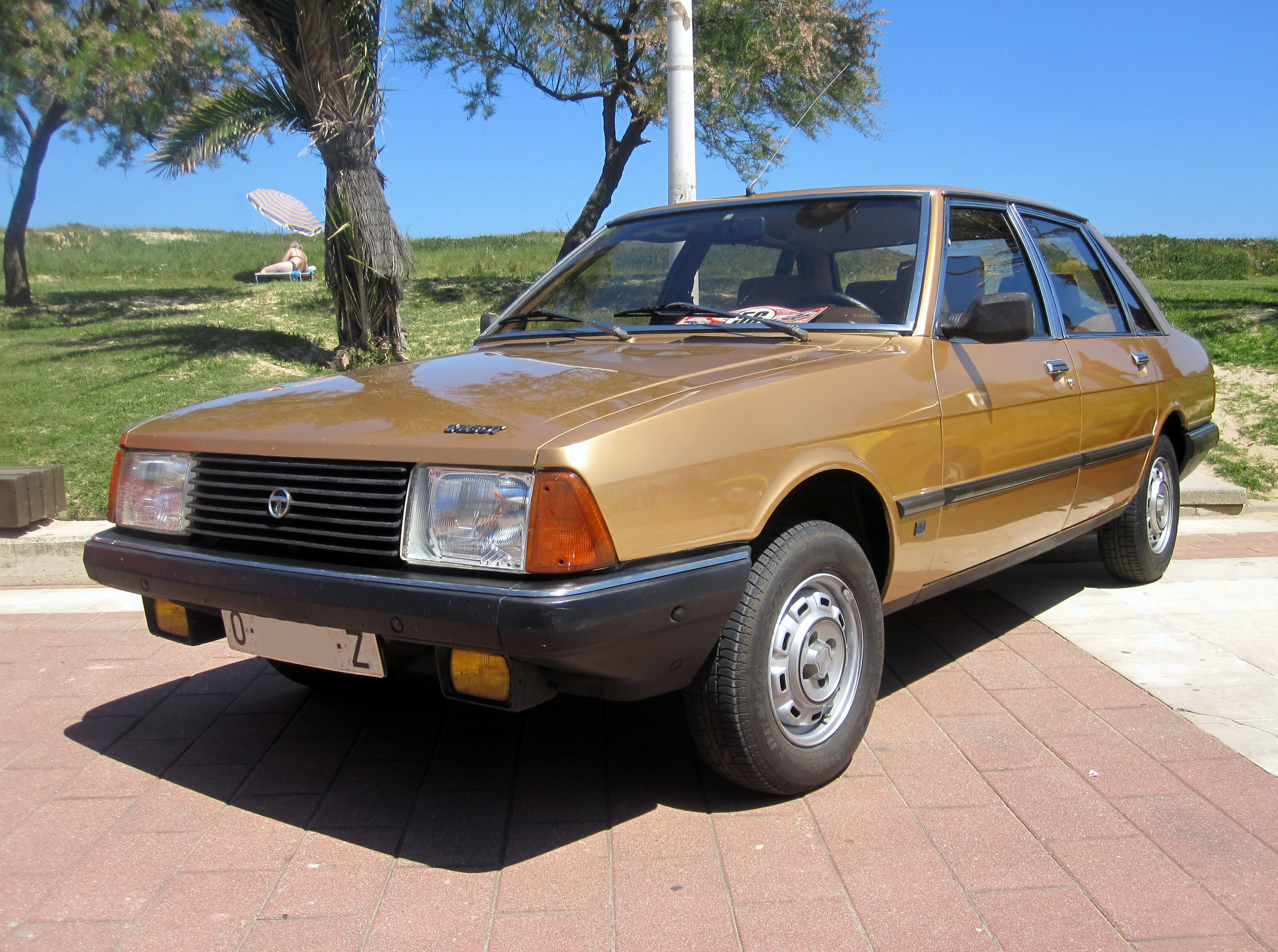
1983 Solara SX

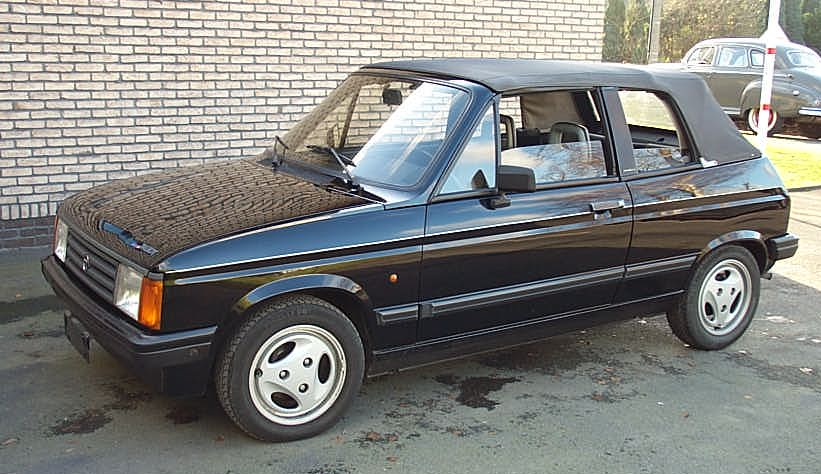
1984 Samba cabrio

Chrysler Europe struggled to enter profitability for much of its existence, and had relied on government support to ensure its survival. With mounting pressure on its core North American business, the decision was taken by Chrysler's then CEO Lee Iacocca to offload the ailing European operations. The French Government persuaded both Renault and PSA Peugeot Citroën to bid for the company; as it was keen to keep Simca in domestic ownership.

In August 1978, PSA negotiated a deal with Chrysler to acquire Chrysler Europe for a nominal $1. Although PSA took responsibility for Chrysler Europe's considerable debts and liabilities, the move was a strategic one; acquiring Simca would remove a strong domestic competitor in the French market while gaining access to that company's expertise in small front wheel drive cars; while at the same time the old Rootes operations would give the company a stronger foothold in the United Kingdom – France's biggest export market where both Peugeot and Citroën lagged behind arch rival Renault. PSA formally took control of the old Chrysler Europe on 1 January 1979. To lead the new group, former British Leyland executive George Turnbull (who had just completed his secondment at Hyundai), was appointed as the managing director of the UK arm.

The Peugeot takeover saw the end of the Rootes' Chrysler Hunter production, but the Chrysler Avenger and Sunbeam (also both Rootes designs), and the Simca 1307 (Chrysler Alpine in UK), and Horizon continued rebadged as Talbots.

All former Chrysler products registered in Britain after 1 August 1979 bore the Talbot badge. Talbot's UK branch manufactured the Alpine, Solara, and Horizon at its aging Ryton plant in Coventry, after the British-developed cars had all been retired, except for the largest revenue source of the UK arm at that time, building CKD kits of the Hillman Hunter to be sent to Iran where they were assembled as the Peykan.

The last remaining car produced by the Rootes group, the Chrysler (previously Hillman) Avenger, remained in production as a Talbot until the end of 1981; production of the Avenger-derived Talbot Sunbeam also ended in 1981. The entry-level model in the Talbot range from December 1981 onwards was the Talbot Samba, a three-door hatchback based on the Peugeot 104.

In 1981, Peugeot began producing the Talbot Tagora, a boxy four-door saloon marketed as a rival to the Ford Granada and to the Vauxhall Carlton/Opel Rekord. But as sales were insufficient in both Britain and France, production ceased in 1983 after only 19,389 units were manufactured.

At the end of 1984, the Alpine hatchback and its related Solara saloon were rebadged Minx and Rapier, depending upon specification rather than body shape. The new names were inherited from the Rootes Group; Rootes had previously produced the Hillman Minx and Sunbeam Rapier. The new versions were produced until 1986. Former Rootes names are still revived occasionally; in 1982, there was a Talbot Solara "Sceptre" model, the name being inherited from the Humber Sceptre which was produced between 1963 and 1976.

=== Decline and Demise ===
In the UK, the Chrysler and Talbot marques had gained nearly 120,000 sales in 1979, only outsold by Ford and British Leyland. However, it then went into decline, not helped by the recession in the early 1980s, or by a lack of new models being launched. By 1985, however, after years of losses, PSA Peugeot Citroën began to question its three-brand strategy. The Talbot Tagora model failed in the marketplace; the Samba was essentially a decade-old design thanks to its Peugeot 104 parentage, whilst the ageing 1510/Alpine/Solara models overlapped with both the Citroën BX and forthcoming Peugeot 405.

At the eleventh hour, the decision was made to release the forthcoming Horizon replacement as the Peugeot 309 instead of Talbot Arizona. It was a controversial decision, because the British arm of the company believed there was greater brand loyalty to Talbot in the UK, with its historical connection to the Rootes Group. However, the decision to concentrate on the Peugeot brand prevailed, and the 309 became the first of a long line of British-built Peugeot models to be assembled at the Ryton plant. Partly because they were perceived as "British" (despite most of their content actually being imported from PSA's French factories), the 309 and the subsequent 405, 306 and 206 models were very successful in the UK market, and regularly featured among the country's top ten best-selling cars.

Around 1984, PSA had also considered launching a replacement for the Talbot Samba based on the platform of the Citroën AX, which was still under-development, but such was the success of the Peugeot 205 in the supermini sector that PSA felt there was little need for a third supermini in its portfolio. It became clear however, that there was no long-term future for the Talbot brand in 1986 when PSA sold the Whitley research and development centre to Jaguar, signalling the end of any more British-developed models.

Production of the Horizon continued in Spain and Finland until 1987, marking the end of the Talbot name on passenger cars (the Samba had been discontinued in May 1986), although the Talbot Express panel van continued in production until 1994, after which the entire Talbot marque was axed.

=== Talbots in the UK ===
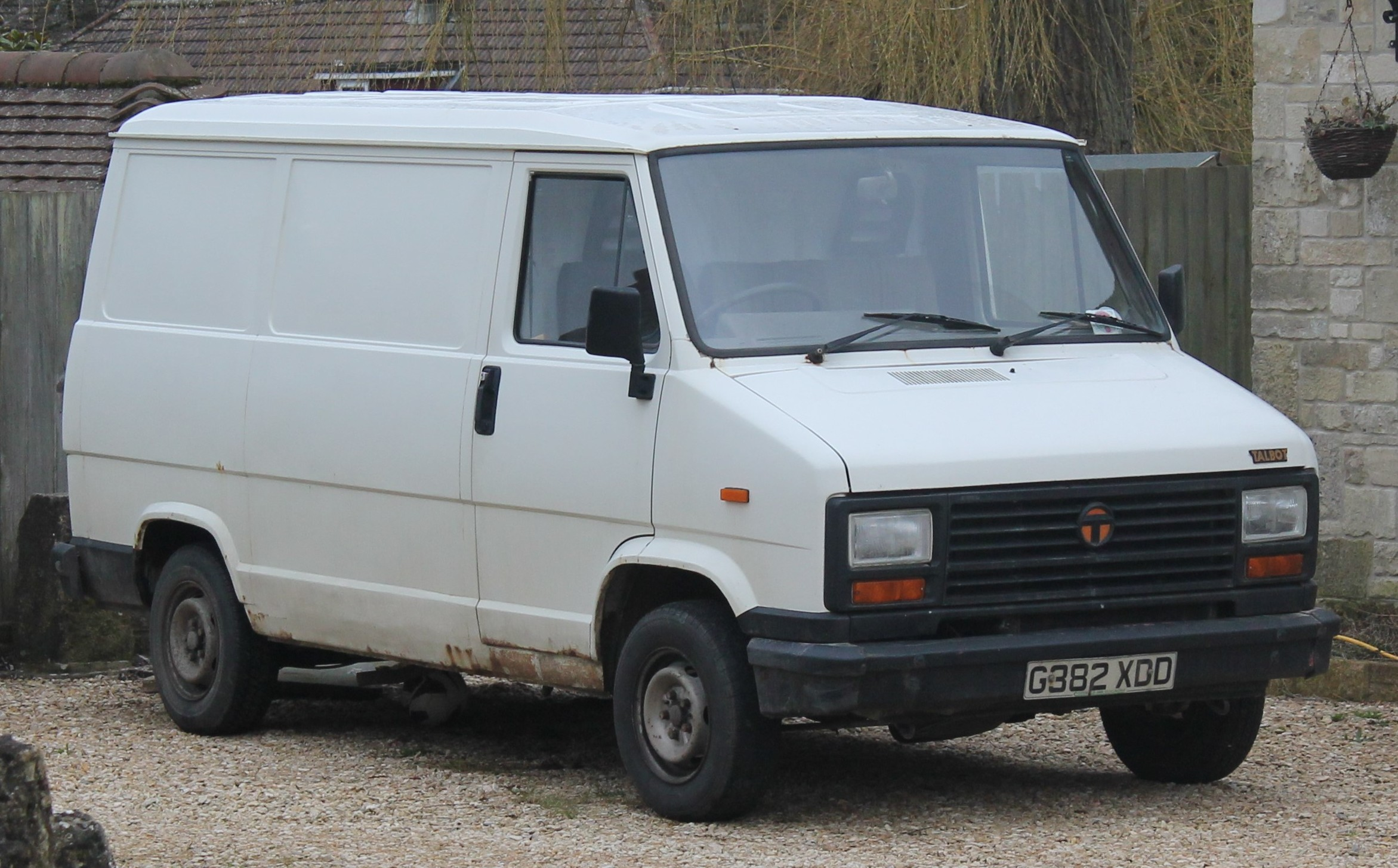
Talbot Express van

The Talbot Express van (along with its identical sister vehicle the Fiat Ducato) was a popular base vehicle for motorhomes and campervan conversions. According to the website How Many Left?, as of June 2016 there were fewer than 40 Alpine/Solara models, 20 Horizons, 10 Sambas and only one Tagora still registered with the British Driver & Vehicle Licensing Agency, compared to well over 5,000 Talbot Express vans, the vast majority of which are motorhomes.

=== Resurrection ===
In 2008, PSA considered reintroducing Talbot to the market, targeting low-budget buyers, as Renault did with its Dacia Logan. It was suggested that these could be models produced in China such as Talbot versions of the Citroën Elysée and of the Peugeot 206, but did not make a comeback as of 2012 because PSA introduced the second-generation Citroën C-Elysée and the Peugeot 301.

The merger of Groupe PSA and Fiat Chrysler Automobiles in 2021 to form Stellantis, saw the Talbot brand again exist under the same corporate umbrella as Chrysler, over 40 years after the dissolution of Chrysler Europe.

== Brand logo evolution ==
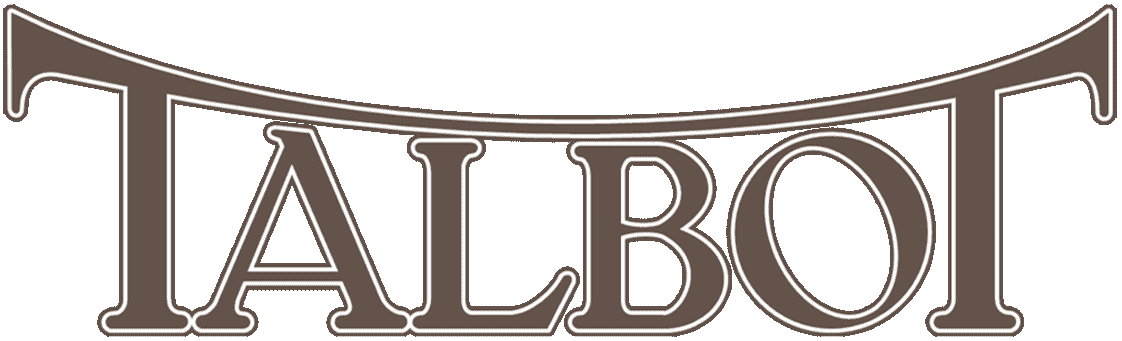
1903–1908 (Note: Clément-Talbot logo.)

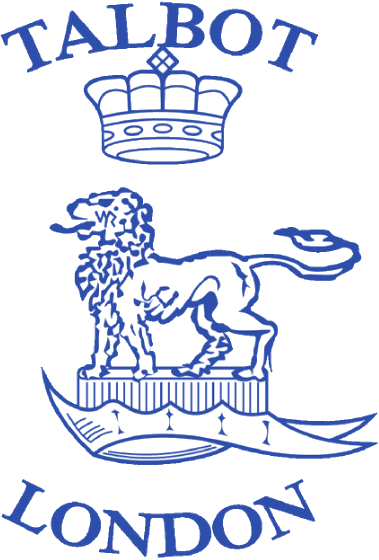
1908–1919

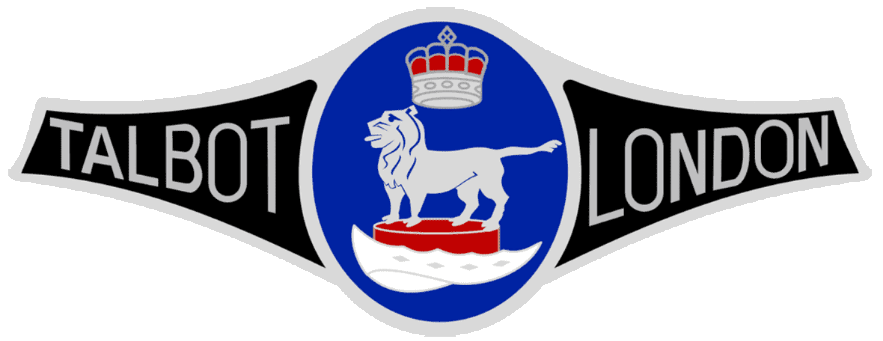
1919–1935

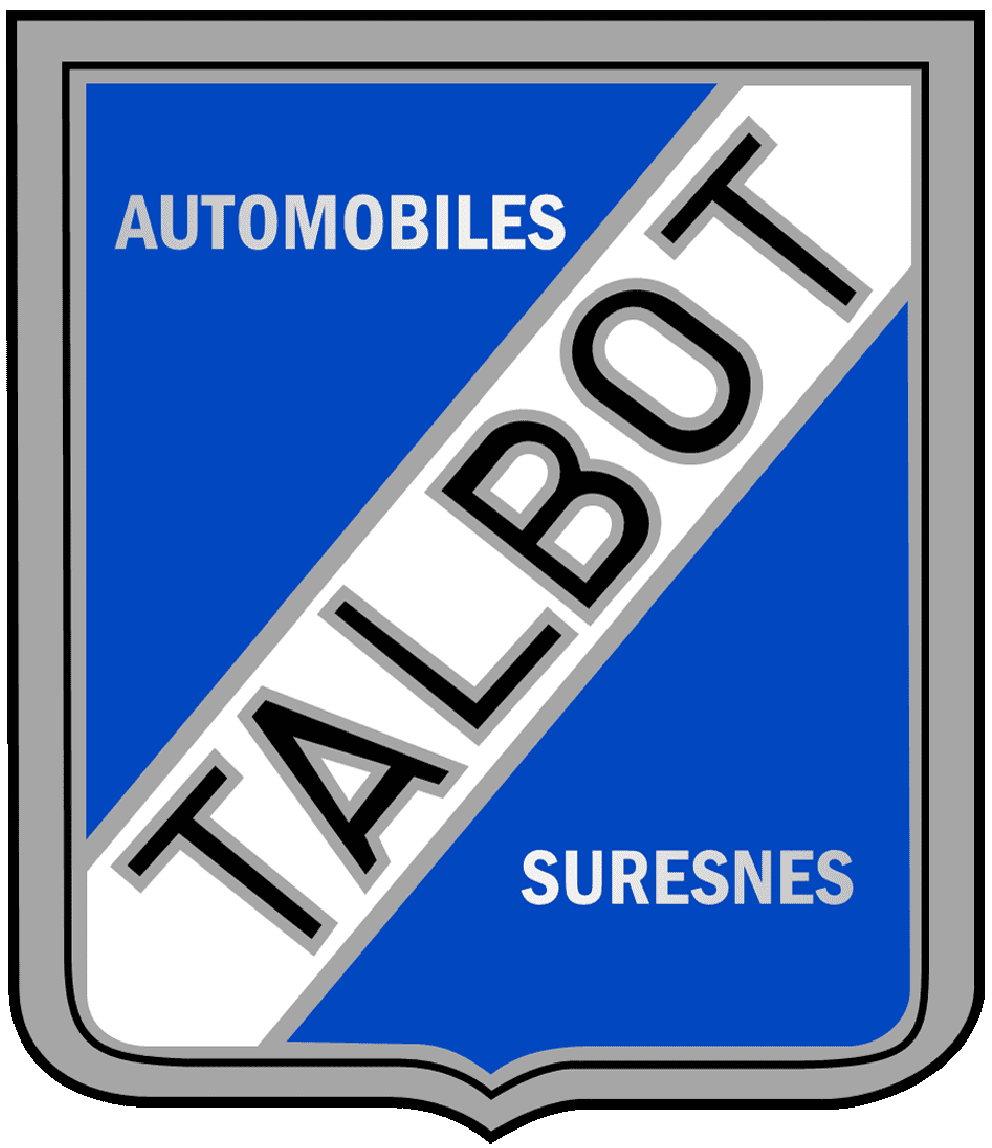
1936–1959 (Note: Used by both, Automobiles Talbot France and successor company Talbot-Lago.)

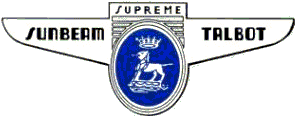
1938–1954 (Note: Sunbeam-Talbot logo.)

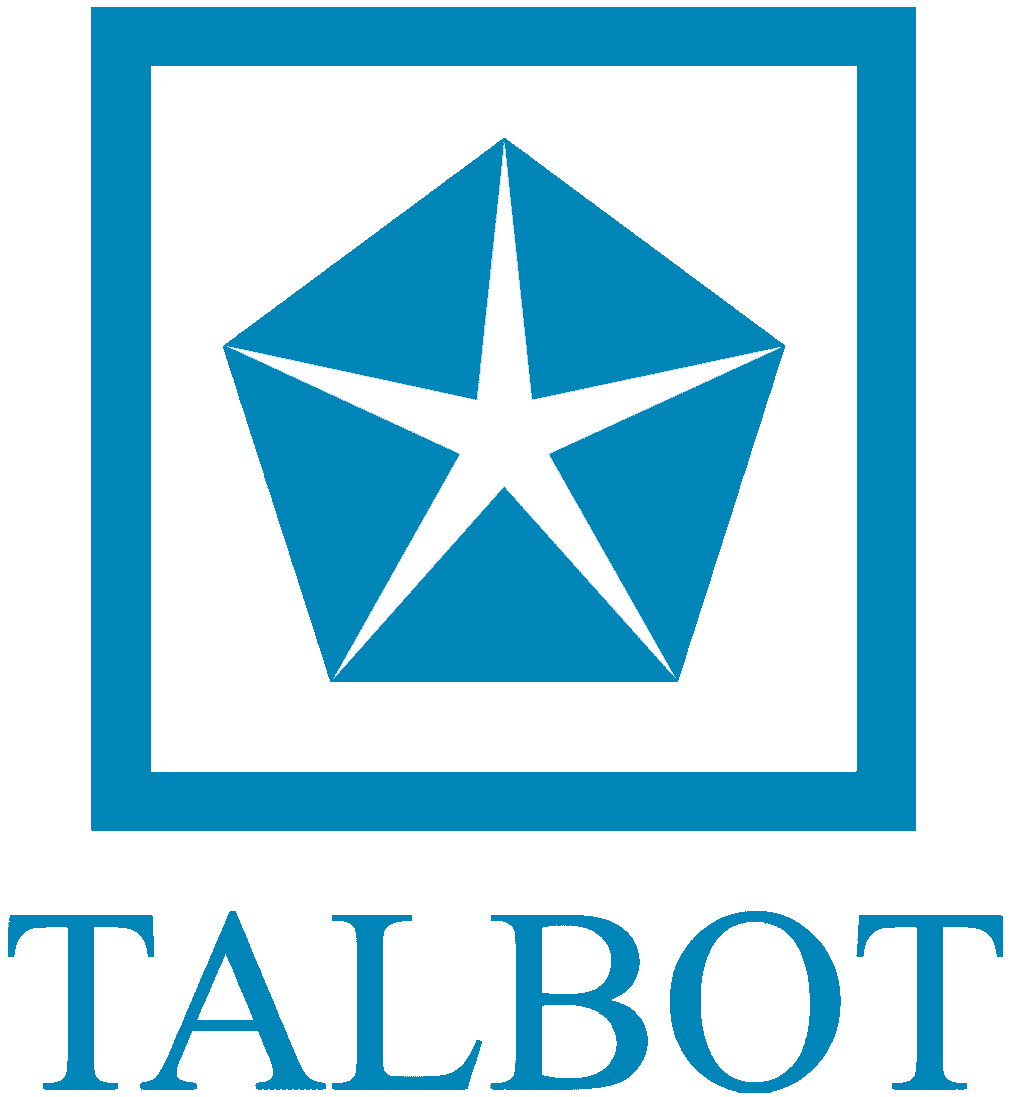
1962–1977 (Note: Talbot brand logo by Chrysler Europe.)

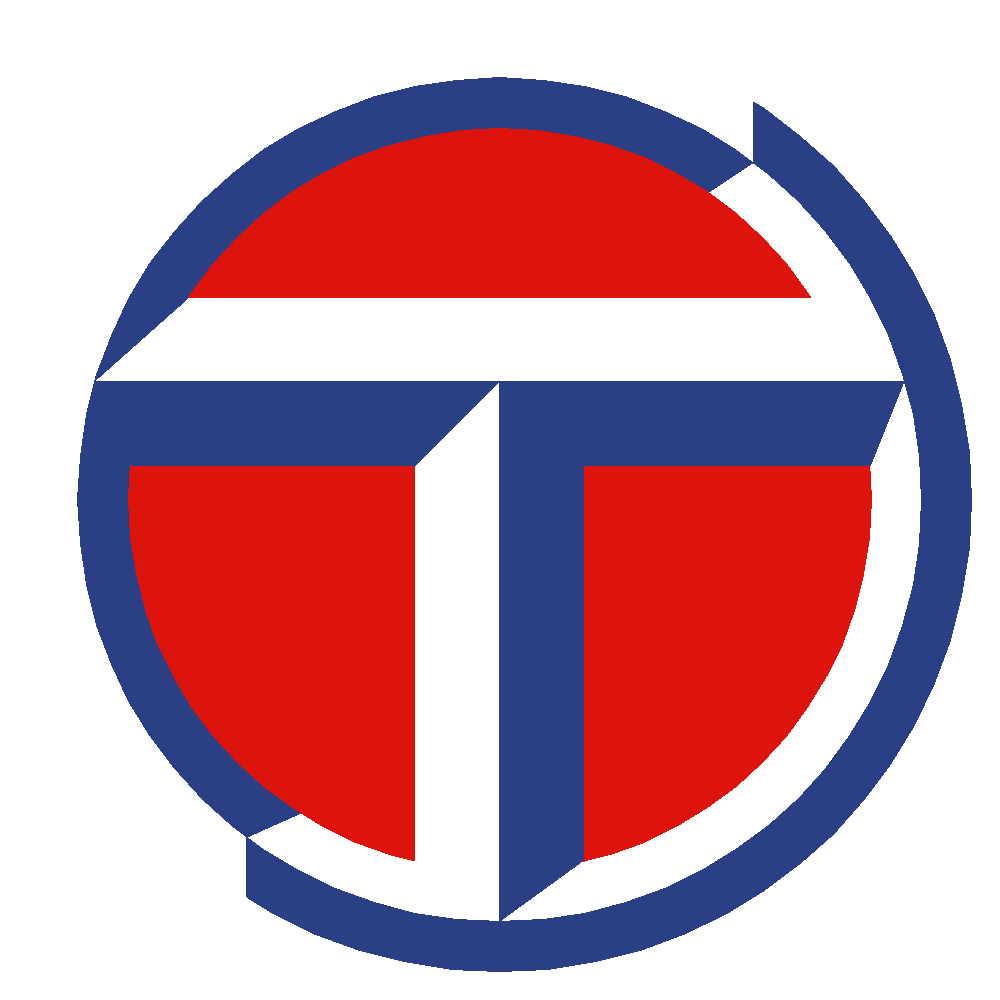
1977–1995 (Note: Talbot brand logo by PSA Group.)

== Vehicles ==
Cars built under the "Talbot" brand (1967–1994)

- 1100 (Note: rebadged Simca.) 1967–1982
- Alpine/Solara/1510 1979–1986
- Avenger (Note: rebadged Hillman.) 1970–1981
- Express van (Note: rebadged Fiat.) 1982–1994
- Horizon (Note: rebadged Chrysler.) 1979–1987
- Marathon 1983–1986
- Murena (Note: rebadged Matra.) 1980–1984
- Minx 1984–1986
- Rapier 1984–1986
- Rancho 1977–1984
- Samba (Note: included a cabriolet version.) 1981–1986
- Sunbeam 1977–1981
- Tagora 1981–1983

== Motorsport ==
=== Formula One ===
Talbot had two brief spells in Formula One. The 4.5-litre, six-cylinder Talbot-Lago T26 was eligible for F1 competition post-war, and many examples, both factory and private, appeared in the first two years of the F1 World Championship, 1950 and 1951. Talbots came fourth and fifth in the inaugural World Championship race, the 1950 British Grand Prix, piloted by Yves Giraud-Cabantous and Louis Rosier respectively. The move to two-litre F2 regulations for 1952 effectively ended Talbot's F1 spell as a manufacturer.

There was a brief participation in Formula One in the 1981 and 1982 seasons by associating with the Ligier team and using its Matra connection to secure a Matra engine for them, changing official constructor's name to Talbot Ligier in both seasons. The Talbot Ligier team was moderately successful, Jacques Laffite coming fourth in the 1981 championship with two wins.

=== World Rally Championship ===
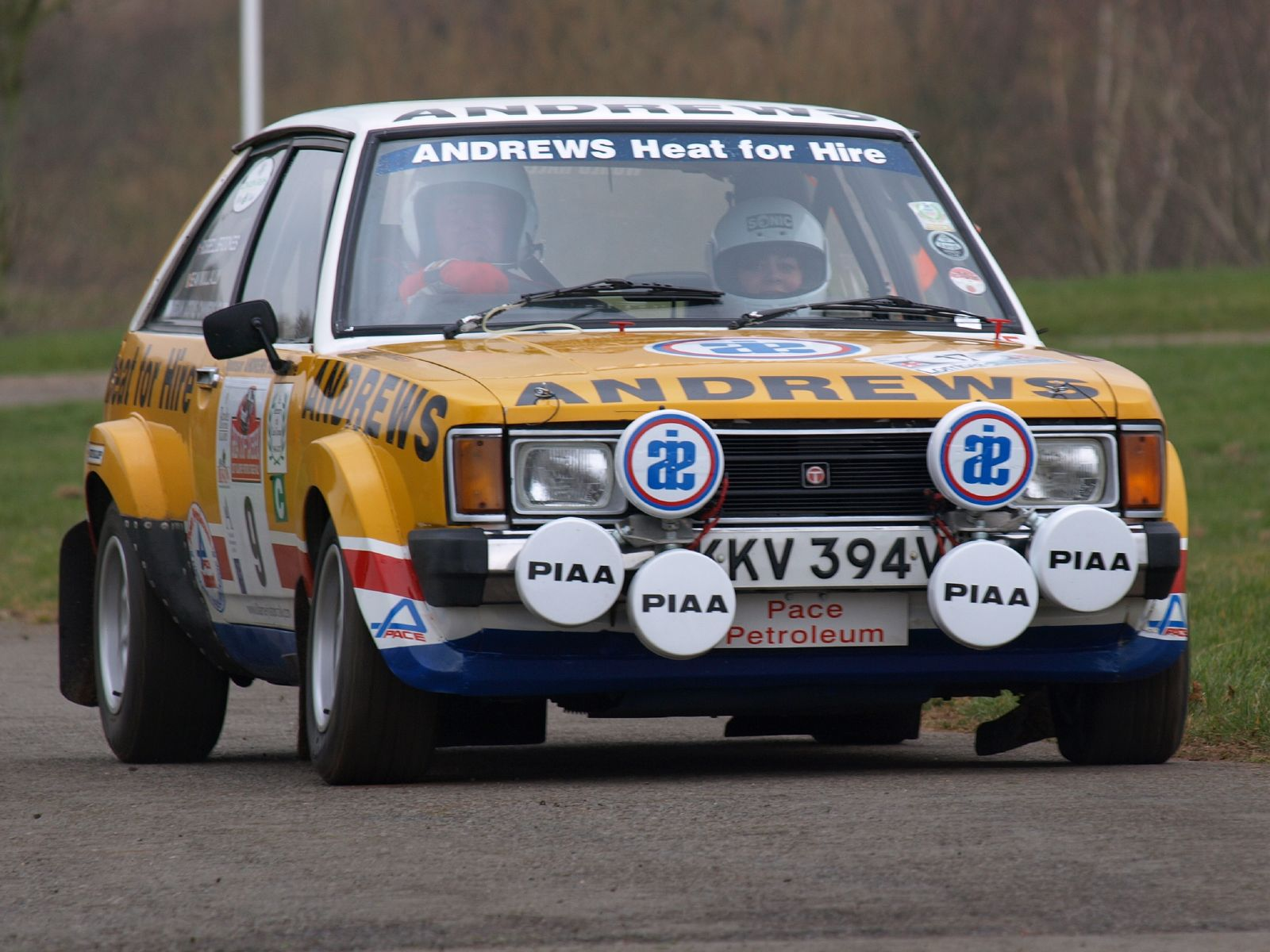
Talbot's Sunbeam Lotus

The Talbot factory team for the World Rally Championship was founded in 1979, after Peugeot had taken over Chrysler Europe and resurrected the Talbot name. In the team's inaugural season in the series, Tony Pond drove the Talbot Sunbeam Lotus to fourth place at the 1979 Rallye Sanremo. More success followed in the 1980 season; Guy Fréquelin brought Talbot the team's first podium by finishing third at the 1980 Rally Portugal, and then Henri Toivonen won the RAC Rally, becoming the youngest-ever driver to win a world rally. The rally was a big success for Talbot as the team also took the third and fourth places, driven by Fréquelin and Russell Brookes, respectively. This was also the last time that a two-wheel-drive car won the RAC Rally. In the manufacturers' world championship, Talbot placed sixth.

In the 1981 season, Talbot continued with Fréquelin and Toivonen. Although the team's only win came at the Rally Argentina, driven by Fréquelin, consistent podiums and points-scoring finishes saw Talbot take the manufacturers' title. Fréquelin narrowly lost the drivers' title to Ford's Ari Vatanen. The 1982 season saw the series dominated by the four-wheel-drive Audi Quattro, and with Group B regulations coming up, Talbot withdrew from the WRC. However, the Talbot name continued in the championship, as Jean Todt founded the Peugeot Talbot Sport in 1981. This Peugeot factory team debuted in 1984 and won the drivers' and manufacturers' titles in 1985 and 1986.

==== Complete WRC results ====
Year	Car	Driver	1	2	3	4	5	6	7	8	9	10	11	12	WDC	Points	WCC	Points
1979	Talbot Sunbeam Lotus	(United Kingdom) Tony Pond	MON	SWE	POR	KEN	GRE	NZL	FIN	CAN	ITA; 4	FRA	GBR; Ret	CIV	22nd	10	14th	12
1979	Talbot Sunbeam Lotus	(France) Jean-Pierre Nicolas	MON	SWE	POR	KEN	GRE	NZL	FIN	CAN	ITA; Ret	FRA; Ret	GBR; Ret	CIV	22nd	10	14th	12
1980	Talbot Sunbeam Lotus	(France) Guy Fréquelin	MON ?	SWE	POR; 3	KEN	GRE	ARG	FIN	NZL	ITA; 4	FRA; Ret	GBR; 3	CIV	8th	34	6th	49
1980	Talbot Sunbeam Lotus	(Finland) Henri Toivonen	MON	SWE	POR; Ret	KEN	GRE	ARG	FIN; Ret	NZL	ITA; 5	FRA	GBR; 1	CIV	10th	28	6th	49
1980	Talbot Sunbeam Lotus	(United Kingdom) Russell Brookes	MON	SWE	POR	KEN	GRE	ARG	FIN	NZL	ITA	FRA	GBR; 4	CIV	25th	10	6th	49
1981	Talbot Sunbeam Lotus	(France) Guy Fréquelin	MON; 2	SWE	POR; 6	KEN	FRA; 2	GRE; 4	ARG; 1	BRA; 2	FIN	ITA; Ret	CIV	GBR; Ret	2nd	89	1st	117
1981	Talbot Sunbeam Lotus	(Finland) Henri Toivonen	MON; 5	SWE	POR; 2	KEN	FRA; Ret	GRE; Ret	ARG	BRA	FIN; Ret	ITA; 2	CIV	GBR; Ret	7th	38	1st	117
1981	Talbot Sunbeam Lotus	(Sweden) Stig Blomqvist	MON	SWE	POR	KEN	FRA	GRE	ARG	BRA	FIN; 8	ITA	CIV	GBR; 3	13th	23	1st	117
1982	Talbot Sunbeam Lotus	(France) Guy Fréquelin	MON	SWE	POR	KEN	FRA	GRE	NZL	BRA	FIN	ITA	CIV	GBR; 11	-	0	10th	24
1982	Talbot Sunbeam Lotus	(Sweden) Stig Blomqvist	MON	SWE	POR	KEN	FRA	GRE	NZL	BRA	FIN	ITA	CIV	GBR; 8	4th*	58*	10th	24

=== World Sportscar Championship ===
The Talbot marque appeared in the motorsport for the last time as a part of the Peugeot Talbot Sport sportscar team founded by Jean Todt which competed in the World Sportscar Championship in the 1990–1992 seasons and at the 1993 24 Hours of Le Mans. The French team won both a drivers' and teams' title at the World Sportscar Championship in the 1992 season and the 24 Hours of Le Mans in 1992 and 1993.

== Sponsorship ==
Talbot was the main sponsor of Coventry City football club from 1981 to 1983, and at one stage the club's chairman Jimmy Hill was planning to change the club's name to Coventry Talbot. However, these plans were vetoed by the Football League and by the summer of 1983 Talbot had ended its association with the club.
