= List of French Formula One engine manufacturers =

Nine French Formula One engine manufacturers have produced engines either for their own cars or those of other Formula One constructors. Bugatti, Gordini, Matra, Peugeot, Renault and Talbot have designed and produced engines. Renault engines are associated with 12 World Constructors' Championship titles and 11 World Drivers' Championship titles.

All engine manufacturers have followed the regulations of Formula One enacted by the Fédération Internationale de l'Automobile (FIA).

== Alphabetical list of French Formula One engine manufacturers ==
=== Bugatti ===
Molsheim-based Bugatti, which competed in Grand Prix racing before the Second World War, created a Formula One engine for its T251. It was designed by Gioacchino Colombo and took part in only one race in 1956.

Engine name	Configuration	Displacement (L)	Aspiration	Output	Year
T2.5 L8	I8	2.5	Naturally-aspirated	230 hp @ 8000 rpm	1956

=== CTA-Arsenal ===
CTA designed an engine for its racing car in 1946. Designed by Albert Lory and manufactured in Châtillon-sous-Bagneux, it only competed in two races, in 1947 and 1949. The project was abandoned before the creation of the Drivers' World Championship in 1950.

Engine name	Configuration	Displacement (L)	Aspiration	Output	Year
-	V8	1.5	Supercharged (two-stage)	275 hp @ 8000 rpm	1946

=== Gordini ===
Amédée Gordini has designed several F1 engines for French automobile manufacturer Simca and for his own company. Simca took part in 14 Grands Prix, from 1951 to 1953, and Gordini took part in 33, from 1952 to 1956.

Engine name	Configuration	Displacement (L)	Aspiration	Output	Year
T15C	I4	1.5	-	195 hp @ 6500 rpm	1950
T20	I6	2.0	-	160 hp @ 7000 rpm	1952
T23	I6	2.5	-	228 hp @ 6500 rpm	1954
T25	I8	2.5	-	260 hp @ 7500 rpm	1955

=== Matra Sports ===
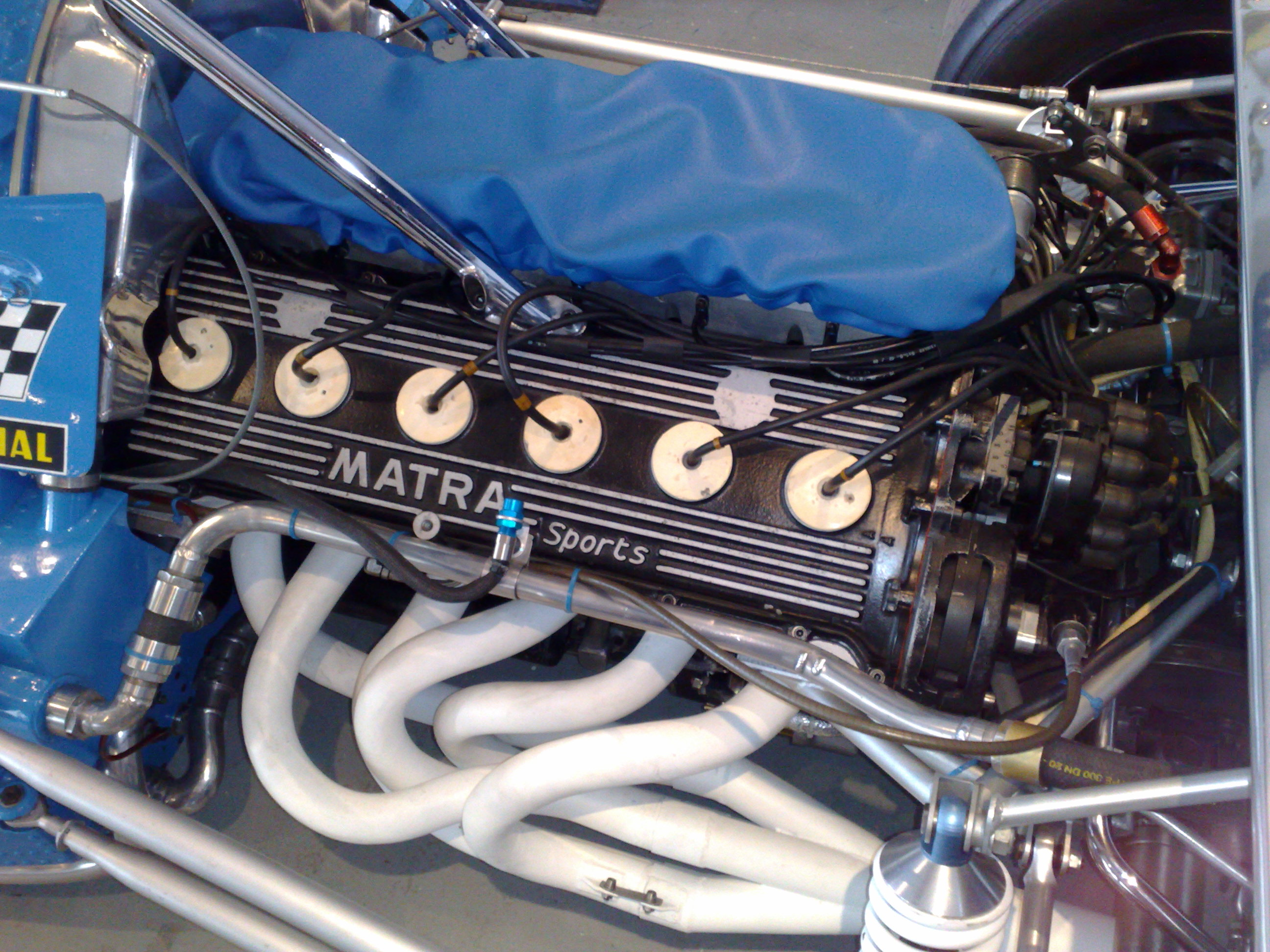
Matra Sports MS12

Matra Sports supplied V12 engines to Formula One Matra from 1968 to 1972, Shadow in 1975, and Ligier from 1976 to 1978 and 1981 and 1982. These engines were designed by Georges Martin.

Engine name	Configuration	Displacement (L)	Aspiration	Output	Year
MS09	V12	3.0	Naturally-aspirated	395 hp @ 10500 rpm	1968
MS12	V12	3.0	Naturally-aspirated	485 hp @ 11400 rpm	1970
MS71	V12	3.0	Naturally-aspirated	440 hp @ 11000 rpm	1971
MS72	V12	3.0	Naturally-aspirated	485 hp @ 11800 rpm	1972
MS73	V12	3.0	Naturally-aspirated	490 hp @ 11500 rpm	1975
MS76	V12	3.0	Naturally-aspirated	520 hp @ 12300 rpm	1977
MS78	V12	3.0	Naturally-aspirated	520 hp @ 12300 rpm	1978
MS81	V12	3.0	Naturally-aspirated	520 hp @ 12300 rpm	1981

=== Mecachrome ===
Mecachrome manufactured engines designed by Renault (RS9) from 1998 to 2000. They were rebadged as Playlife for Benetton, and rebadged as Supertec for Williams and BAR.

- GC3701-RS09 (1998): V10, 3.0 L, 775 hp @ 17,000 rpm.

=== Peugeot ===
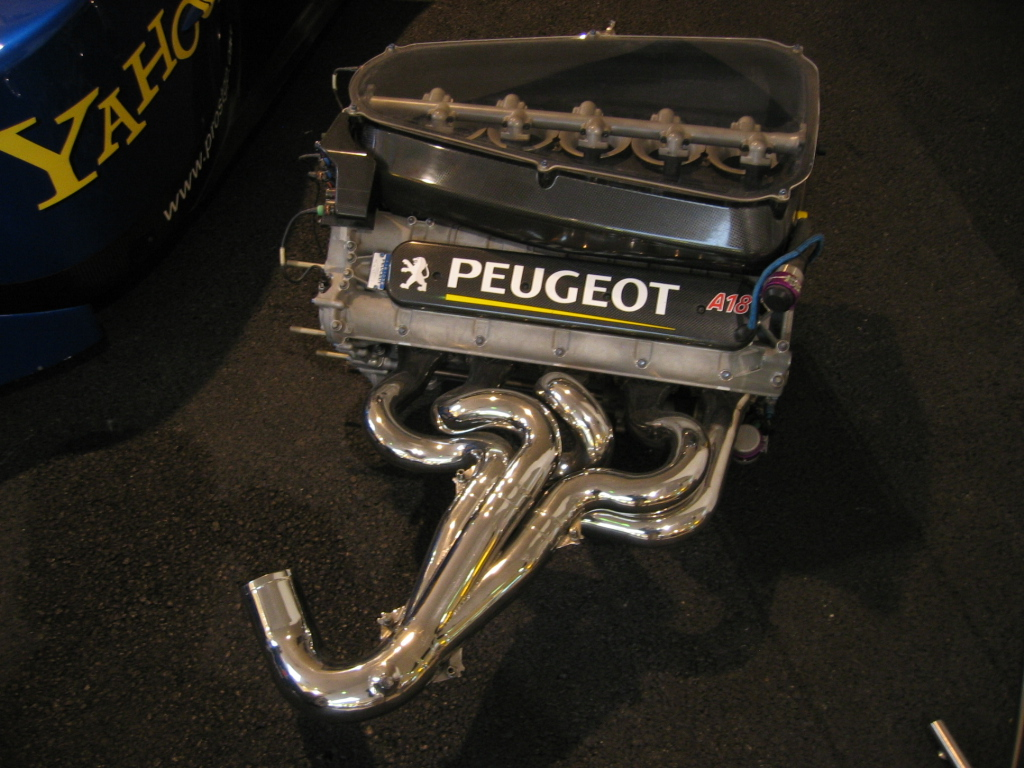
Peugeot A18

Peugeot Sport supplied V10 engines to a few Formula One teams: McLaren in 1994, Jordan from 1995 to 1997, and Prost from 1998 to 2000.

Engine name	Configuration	Displacement (L)	Aspiration	Output	Year
A4	V10	3.5	Naturally-aspirated	700 hp @ 14,250 rpm	1994
A6	V10	3.5	Naturally-aspirated	760 hp @ 14,500 rpm	1994
A10	V10	3.0	Naturally-aspirated	760 hp @ 15,500 rpm	1995
A12	V10	3.0	Naturally-aspirated	720 hp @ 16,000 rpm	1996
A14	V10	3.0	Naturally-aspirated	750 hp @ 16,000 rpm	1997
A16	V10	3.0	Naturally-aspirated	765 hp @ 17,000 rpm	1998
A18	V10	3.0	Naturally-aspirated	785 hp @ 17,000 rpm	1999
A20	V10	3.0	Naturally-aspirated	800 hp @ 17,500 rpm	2000

=== Renault ===
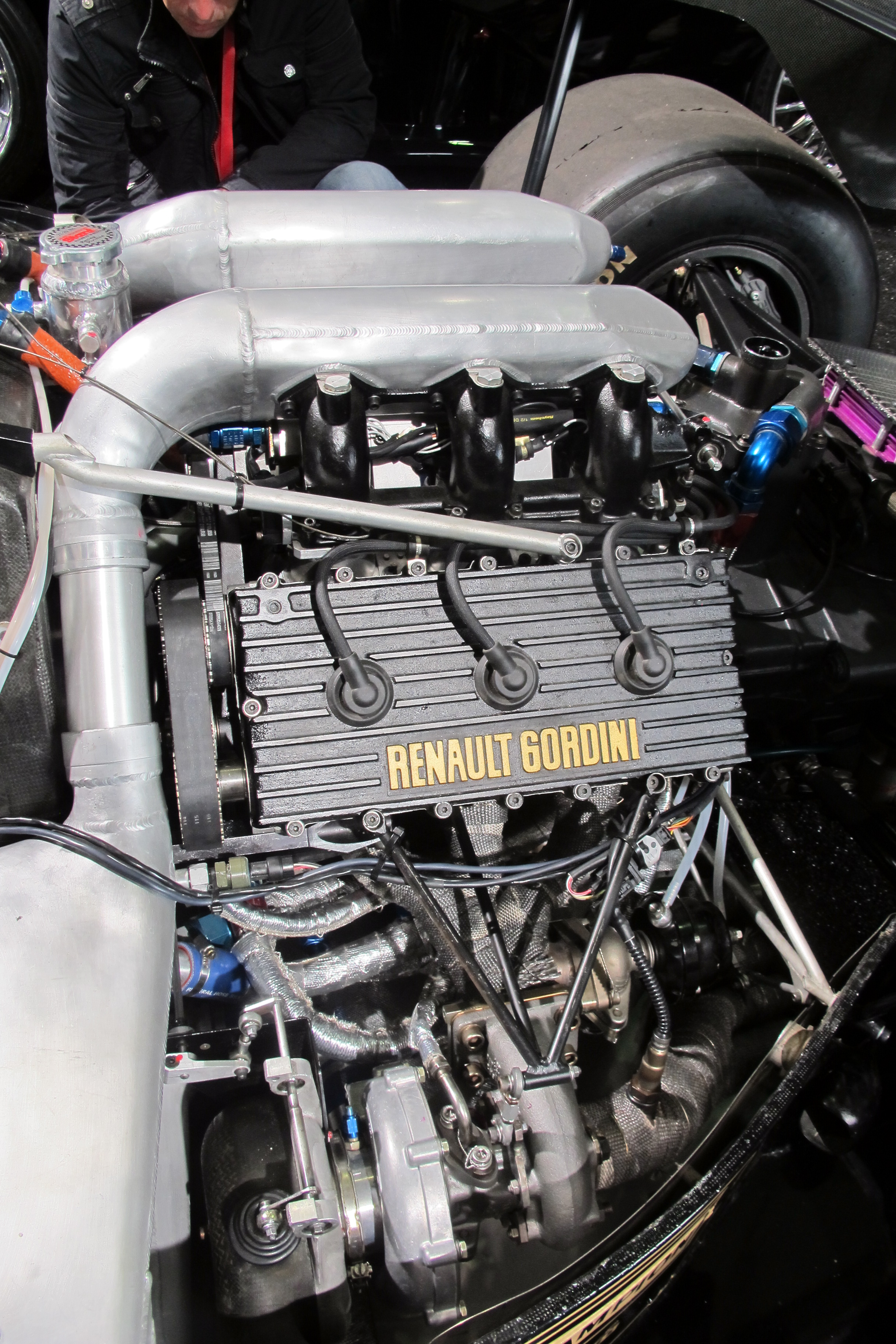
Renault EF4

Renault engines equipped Renault's F1 cars from 1977 to 1985, from 2002 to 2011, and 2016 to the present day.

They have also supplied other teams:

- Team Lotus (1983–1986)
- Équipe Ligier (1984–1986, 1990, 1992–1994)
- Tyrrell Racing (1985–1986)
- Williams Grand Prix Engineering (1990–1997, 2012–2013)
- Benetton Formula (1995–1997, 2001)
- Red Bull Racing (2007–2015)
- Caterham F1 (2011–2014)
- Lotus F1 (2012–2014)
- Scuderia Toro Rosso (2014–2015, 2017)
- McLaren F1 Team (2018-2020)
- Alpine F1 Team (2021)

==== Turbocharged V6 engines ====
Engine name	Configuration	Displacement (L)	Aspiration	Output	Year
EF1	V6	1.5	Turbocharged	510 hp @ 11000 rpm	1977
EF1	V6	1.5	Turbocharged	650 hp @ 12000 rpm	1983
EF4	V6	1.5	Turbocharged	750 hp @ 11500 rpm	1984
EF4B	V6	1.5	Turbocharged	760 hp @ 11500 rpm	1984
EF15	V6	1.5	Turbocharged	810 hp @ 11500 rpm	1985
EF15B	V6	1.5	Turbocharged	900 hp @ 12500 rpm	1986

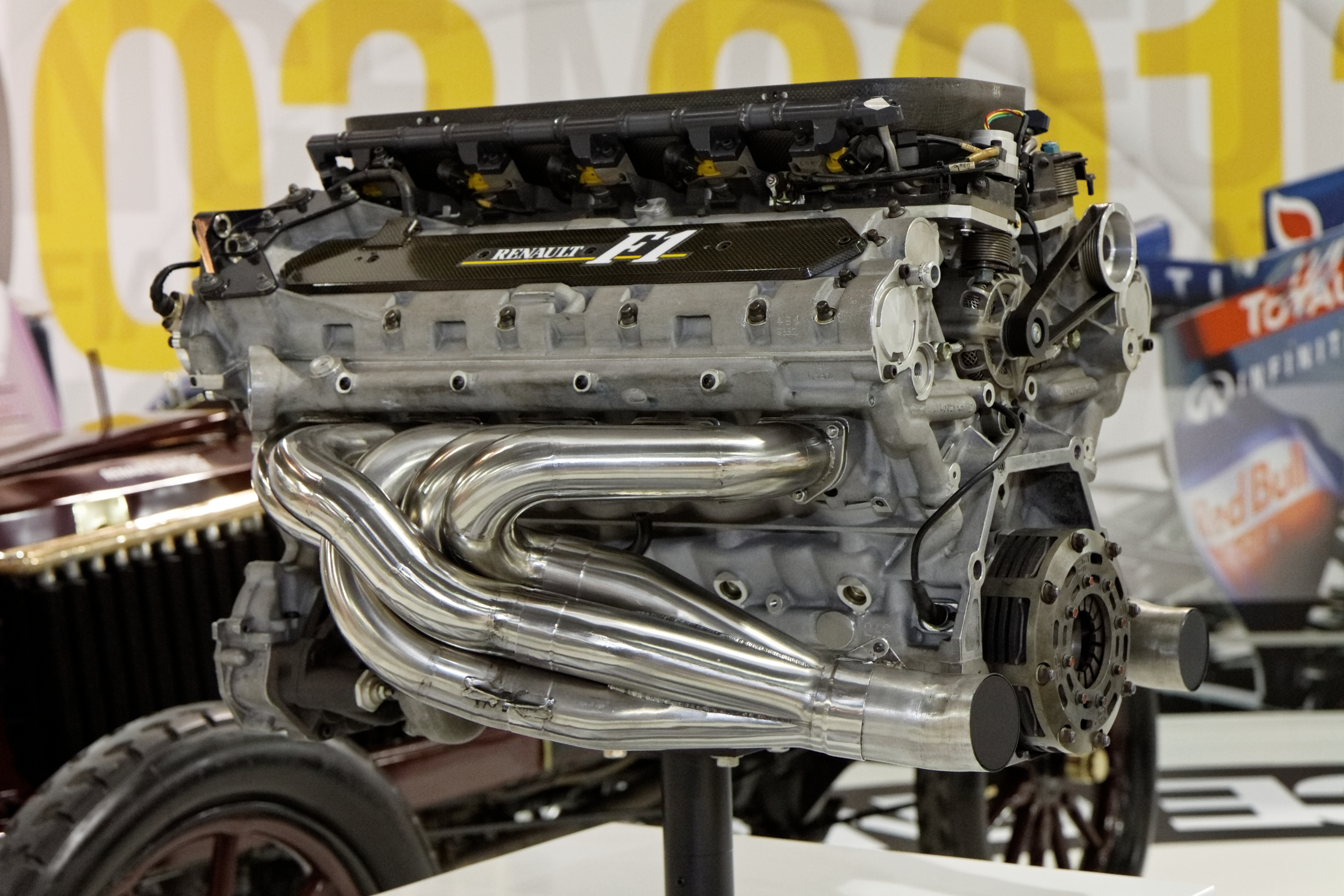
Renault RS2

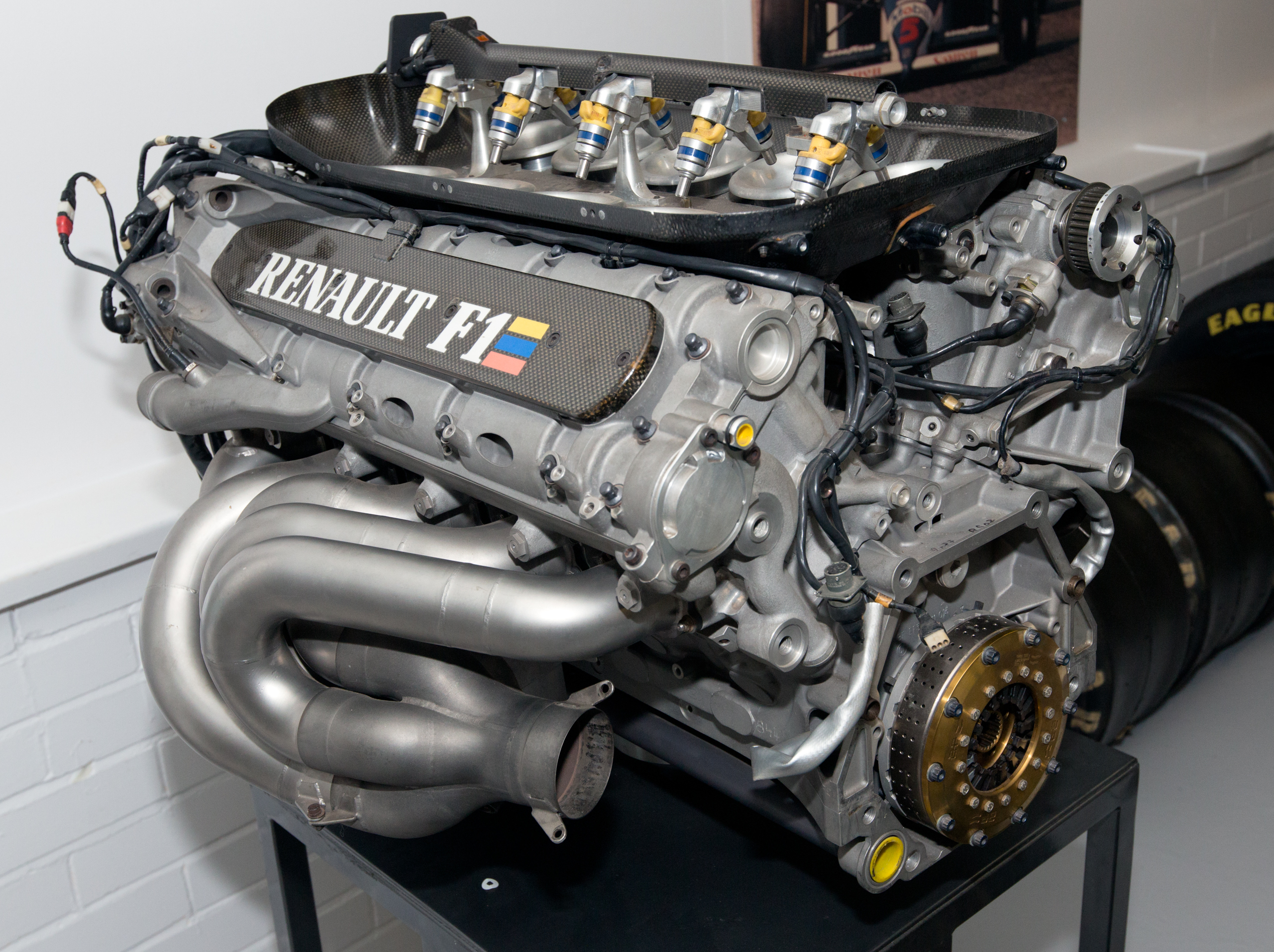
Renault RS7

==== Naturally-aspirated V10 engines ====
Engine name	Bank angle (°)	Configuration	Displacement (L)	Aspiration	Output	Year	Wins
RS1	67	V10	3.5	Naturally-aspirated	650 hp @ 12,500 rpm	1989	N/A
RS2	67	V10	3.5	Naturally-aspirated	660 hp @ 12,800 rpm	1990	N/A
RS3	67	V10	3.5	Naturally-aspirated	700 hp @ 12,500 rpm	1991	N/A
RS4	67	V10	3.5	Naturally-aspirated	750 hp @ 13,000 rpm	1992	Nigel Mansell (World Drivers' Championship) Williams-Renault (World Constructors' Championship)
RS5	67	V10	3.5	Naturally-aspirated	760-780 hp @ 13,800 rpm	1993	Alain Prost (World Drivers' Championship) Williams-Renault (World Constructors' Championship)
RS6/RS6B/RS6C	67	V10	3.5	Naturally-aspirated	790-830 hp @ 14,300 rpm	1994	Williams-Renault (World Constructors' Championship)
RS7	67	V10	3.0	Naturally-aspirated	675-700 hp @ 15,200-15,600 rpm	1995	Michael Schumacher (World Drivers' Championship) Benetton-Renault (World Constructors' Championship)
RS8	67	V10	3.0	Naturally-aspirated	700-760 hp @ 14,500-16,000 rpm	1996	Damon Hill (World Drivers' Championship) Williams-Renault (World Constructors' Championship)
RS9	71	V10	3.0	Naturally-aspirated	730-760 hp @ 14,600-16,000 rpm	1997	Jacques Villeneuve (World Drivers' Championship) Williams-Renault (World Constructors' Championship)
RS21	112	V10	3.0	Naturally-aspirated	780 hp @ 17,400 rpm	2001	N/A
RS22	112	V10	3.0	Naturally-aspirated	825 hp @ 17,500 rpm	2002	N/A
RS23	112	V10	3.0	Naturally-aspirated	830 hp @ 18,000 rpm	2003	N/A
RS24	72	V10	3.0	Naturally-aspirated	880-900 hp @ 19,000 rpm	2004	N/A
RS25	72	V10	3.0	Naturally-aspirated	900+ hp @ 19,000 rpm	2005	Fernando Alonso (World Drivers' Championship) Renault (World Constructors' Championship)

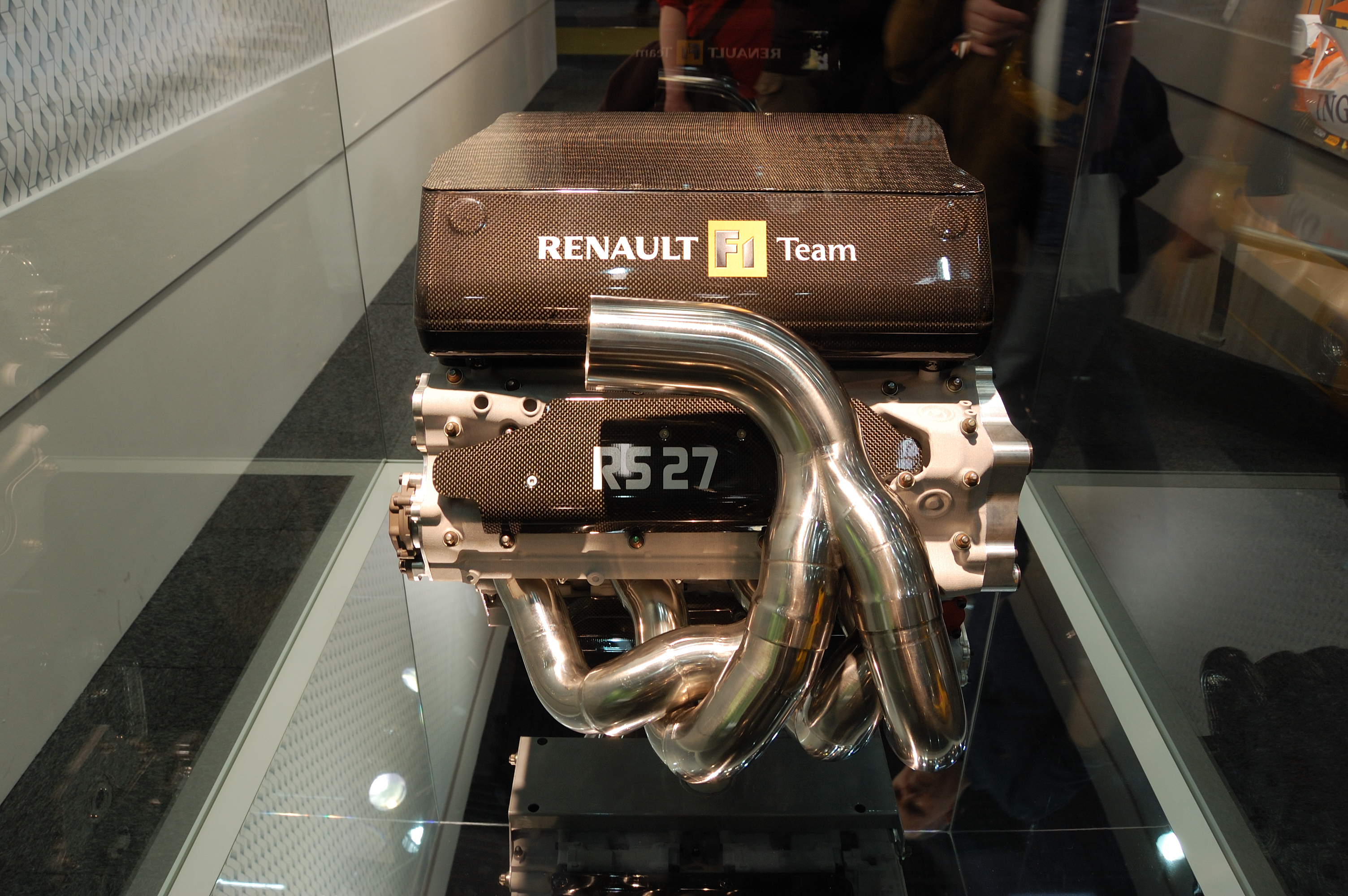
Renault RS27

==== Naturally-aspirated V8 engines ====
Engine name	Bank angle (°)	Configuration	Displacement (L)	Aspiration	Output	Year	Wins
RS26	90	V8	2.4	Naturally-aspirated	775-800 hp @ 20500 rpm	2006	Fernando Alonso (World Drivers' Championship) Renault (World Constructors' Championship)
RS27	90	V8	2.4	Naturally-aspirated	770 hp @ 19000 rpm	2007	N/A
RS27	90	V8	2.4	Naturally-aspirated	>770 hp @ 19000 rpm	2008	N/A
RS27	90	V8	2.4	Naturally-aspirated	>750 hp @ 18000 rpm	2009	N/A
RS27	90	V8	2.4	Naturally-aspirated	>750 hp @ 18000 rpm	2010	Sebastian Vettel (World Drivers' Championship) Red Bull-Renault (World Constructors' Championship)
RS27	90	V8	2.4	Naturally-aspirated	>750 hp @ 18000 rpm	2011	Sebastian Vettel (World Drivers' Championship) Red Bull-Renault (World Constructors' Championship)
RS27	90	V8	2.4	Naturally-aspirated	>750 hp @ 18000 rpm	2012	Sebastian Vettel (World Drivers' Championship) Red Bull-Renault (World Constructors' Championship)
RS27	90	V8	2.4	Naturally-aspirated	>750 hp @ 18000 rpm	2013	Sebastian Vettel (World Drivers' Championship) Red Bull-Renault (World Constructors' Championship)

==== Turbocharged V6 engines with ERS ====
Engine name	Bank angle (°)	Configuration	Displacement (L)	Aspiration	Output	Year
R.E. F1	90	V6	1.6	Turbocharged	760 hp @ 10500 rpm	2014
R.E. F1	90	V6	1.6	Turbocharged	850 hp @ 10500 rpm	2015
R.E. F1	90	V6	1.6	Turbocharged	875 hp @ 10500 rpm	2016
R.E. F1	90	V6	1.6	Turbocharged	>900 hp @ 10500 rpm	2017
R.E. F1	90	V6	1.6	Turbocharged	>900 hp @ 10500 rpm	2018
R.E. F1	90	V6	1.6	Turbocharged	>950 hp @ 10500 rpm	2019
R.E. F1	90	V6	1.6	Turbocharged	>950 hp @ 10500 rpm	2020
R.E. F1	90	V6	1.6	Turbocharged	>950 hp @ 10500 rpm	2021

=== Supertec ===
Supertec supplied Renault-designed, Mecachrome-built 1998 season engines updated for 1999 and 2000. Founded by Flavio Briatore, the company supplied Williams, Benetton and BAR in 1999, and Benetton and Arrows in 2000, with Mecachrome engines.

Engine name	Weight	Bank angle (°)	Configuration	Displacement (L)	Aspiration	Output	Year
FB01	121 kg	71	V10	3.0	Naturally-aspirated	780 hp @ 15800 rpm	1999
FB02	117 kg	71	V10	3.0	Naturally-aspirated	780 hp @ 15800 rpm	2000

=== Talbot ===
Talbot made two engines for Talbot-Darracq and Talbot-Lago Formula One cars.

Engine name	Configuration	Displacement (L)	Aspiration	Output	Year
700	I8	1.5	Supercharged	165 hp @ 7200 rpm	1950
23 CV	I6	4.5	-	280 hp @ 5000 rpm	1950
