= Peugeot Sport =

Motorsport division of Peugeot

- Peugeot Sport logo used since 2020
- Formerly: Peugeot Talbot Sport
- Type: Division
- Industry: Automotive; Auto racing
- Founded: 1981; 45 years ago
- Founder: Jean Todt
- Area served: Worldwide
- Parent: Peugeot
- Website: peugeot-sport.com

Peugeot Sport is the department of French carmaker Peugeot responsible for motorsport activities.

== History ==
=== Beginnings in rallying ===
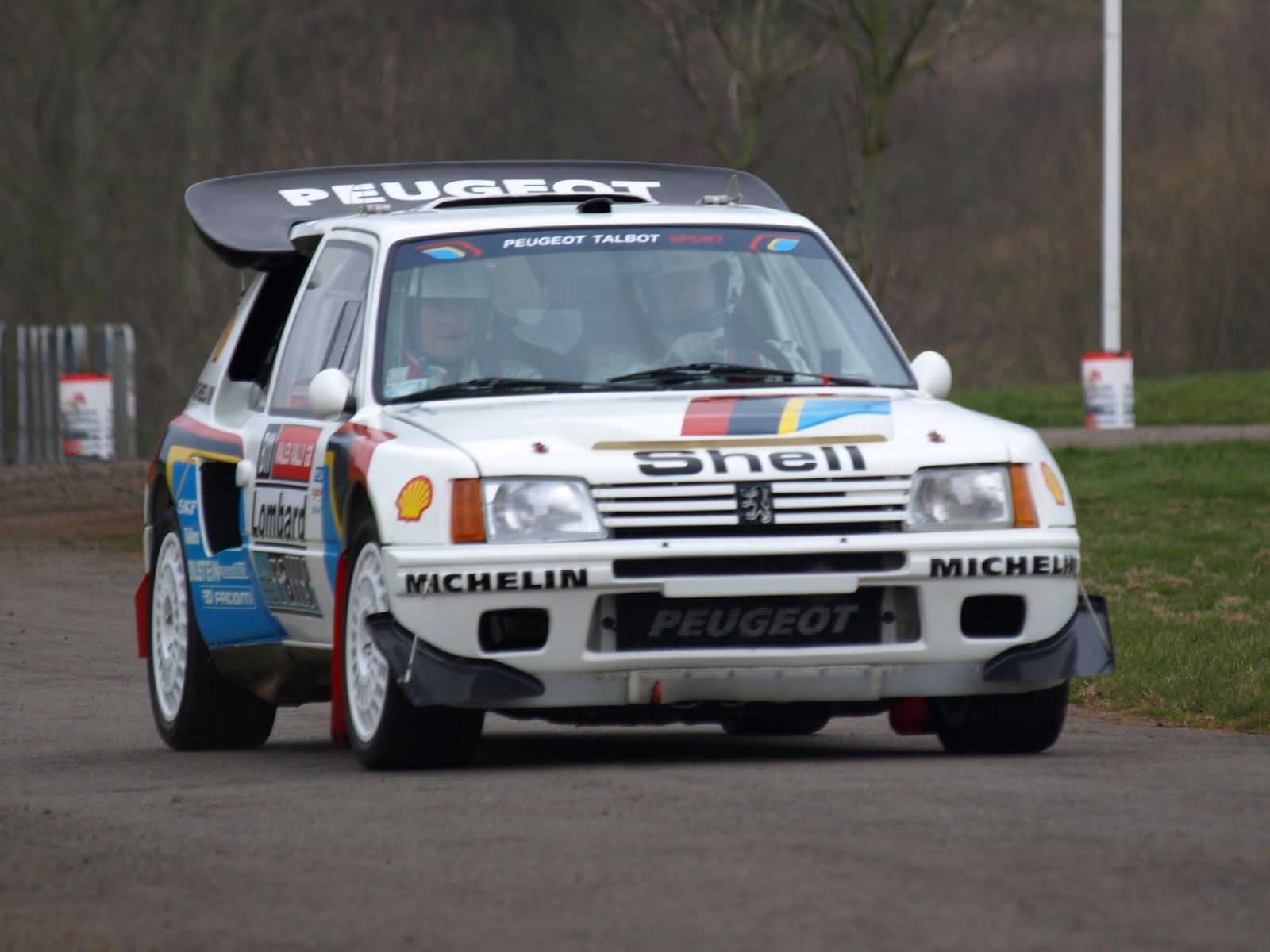
Peugeot 205 Turbo 16 Evo 2.

Peugeot Sport was formed in 1981 under the name of Peugeot Talbot Sport, after Jean Todt, a World Rally Championship co-driver for Talbot driver Guy Fréquelin, was asked by Peugeot to create a sporting department for the PSA Peugeot Citroën group.

The rally team, established at 8, rue Paul Bert, Boulogne-Billancourt (the sportscar racing team will leave those premises in July 1990 to go to Vélizy-Villacoublay) near Paris, France debuted its Group B Peugeot 205 Turbo 16 in the 1984 season, and took its first victory in Rally Finland in the hands of Ari Vatanen.

In the 1985 season, Peugeot drivers Vatanen and Timo Salonen won seven out of the 12 rounds to give Peugeot its first manufacturers' title and Salonen the drivers' title. Vatanen had been seriously injured in an accident in Argentina in 1985, so was replaced by Juha Kankkunen for the 1986 season, who promptly delivered the team the second consecutive title. The FIA banned Group B cars for the 1987 season after the fatal accident of Henri Toivonen. This lead Peugeot to switch to rally raid, using the 205 to win the Dakar Rally for two consecutive years in 1987 to 1988, and then used the 405 to win in 1989 and 1990. Peugeot Talbot Sport also participated three times at the Pikes Peak Hillclimb Race in 1987, 1988 and 1989, winning the last two years, as well as in 2013 with the 208 T16.

=== Move to sportscars ===
In endurance racing Peugeot Talbot Sport established their sportscar racing team at Vélizy-Villacoublay near Paris, France and in November 1988 launched the Peugeot 905 project, to develop a sportscar in the sports prototype category to begin competing in the World Sportscar Championship in the 1991 season.

The 905 made its racing debut in the final two races of the 1990 season, and finished second in the 1991 season. In the 1992 season, Peugeot Talbot Sport won the 24 Hours of Le Mans, with drivers Derek Warwick, Yannick Dalmas and Mark Blundell. They also won the 1992 World Sportscar Championship, thanks to Warwick, Dalmas, Philippe Alliot and Mauro Baldi. The championship did not run in 1993, but Peugeot were able to take a 1–2–3 finish at the 1993 24 Hours of Le Mans, with Éric Hélary, Christophe Bouchut and Geoff Brabham driving the winning car. Peugeot Talbot Sport subsequently pulled out of sportscar racing. Jean Todt, meanwhile, left Peugeot for Scuderia Ferrari.

=== Formula One ===
Peugeot switched to Formula One for 1994, using a similar 3.5L V10 engine as found in the 905 and intended to compete against engine manufacturer compatriot Renault. This was developed to be used by McLaren in 1994. However, poor reliability led to the relationship ending at the end of 1994 after 8 podiums, zero victories and 17 DNFs. It was then revealed that the main reason for the relationship collapsing was because Peugeot did not provide the factory support promised when McLaren signed with them over the alternative Chrysler-Lamborghini offering. McLaren elected to switch to works Ilmor-built Mercedes-Benz High Performance Engines with guaranteed factory support from Mercedes directly and in effect becoming their new works team from the 1995 season onwards. This led to Peugeot supplying Jordan Grand Prix in 1995, 1996, and 1997 with 5 podiums as best results, Peugeot's best chance of victory during this time came at the 1995 Canadian Grand Prix when both Eddie Irvine and Rubens Barrichello finished 2nd and 3rd on the podium respectively, political pressures from France however meant Peugeot switched their allegiance to the Prost Grand Prix team for the 1998, 1999 and 2000 seasons for an attempt at becoming an all French Powerhouse and thus Prost earned Peugeot's direct factory support. It was established just a few days before the partnership was made official that Peugeot had changed the terms of their agreement with Prost meaning they had to pay Peugeot for the engines over a period of 3 Seasons rather than receiving them for free over a period of 5 Seasons, this left Prost with little to no choice but to agree to the new terms as it would have left them with little to no time to either find a new engine supplier or returning to Mugen-Honda which was not possible as they had already reached an agreement to supply Jordan, however also not doing so would have had major ramifications with potential sponsors pulling out of sponsoring them, the relationship was a disaster, in 1998 a measly 1 point was scored over the entire season in Belgium courtesy of Jarno Trulli which was a stark contrast to the 33 points Peugeot had scored with Jordan in 1997, 1999 was only a slight improvement with 9 points scored though a final podium was achieved for Peugeot at the 1999 European Grand Prix courtesy of Trulli finishing 2nd, However, after a pointless 2000 season where poor reliability matched with Prost's inability to deliver a competitive chassis combined with having scored no wins since their debut as an engine supplier in 1994, led to the French marque pulling the plug out of F1 after 115 Grand Prix entries with just 14 podiums scored. At the end of 2000, Frederic Saint-Geours, the CEO of Peugeot said "In life one must never say never, but if you want my opinion, it is that Peugeot will never again race in F1"

The Peugeot engines were bought by an Asian consortium led by former F1 designer Enrique Scalabroni called Asiatech and used for two further years (in 2001 for Arrows and in 2002 for Minardi. The former named Peugeot engine's best result during this time was at the 2002 Australian Grand Prix when Mark Webber managed an incredible 5th place on his debut, this unexpected success meant the team were allowed an exception to celebrate on the Podium Step. The Asiatech engines were both reliable, powerful and were supplied at zero cost, but its poor driveability led to both teams replacing them in favor of more costly but more capable Cosworth units.

=== Touring car racing ===
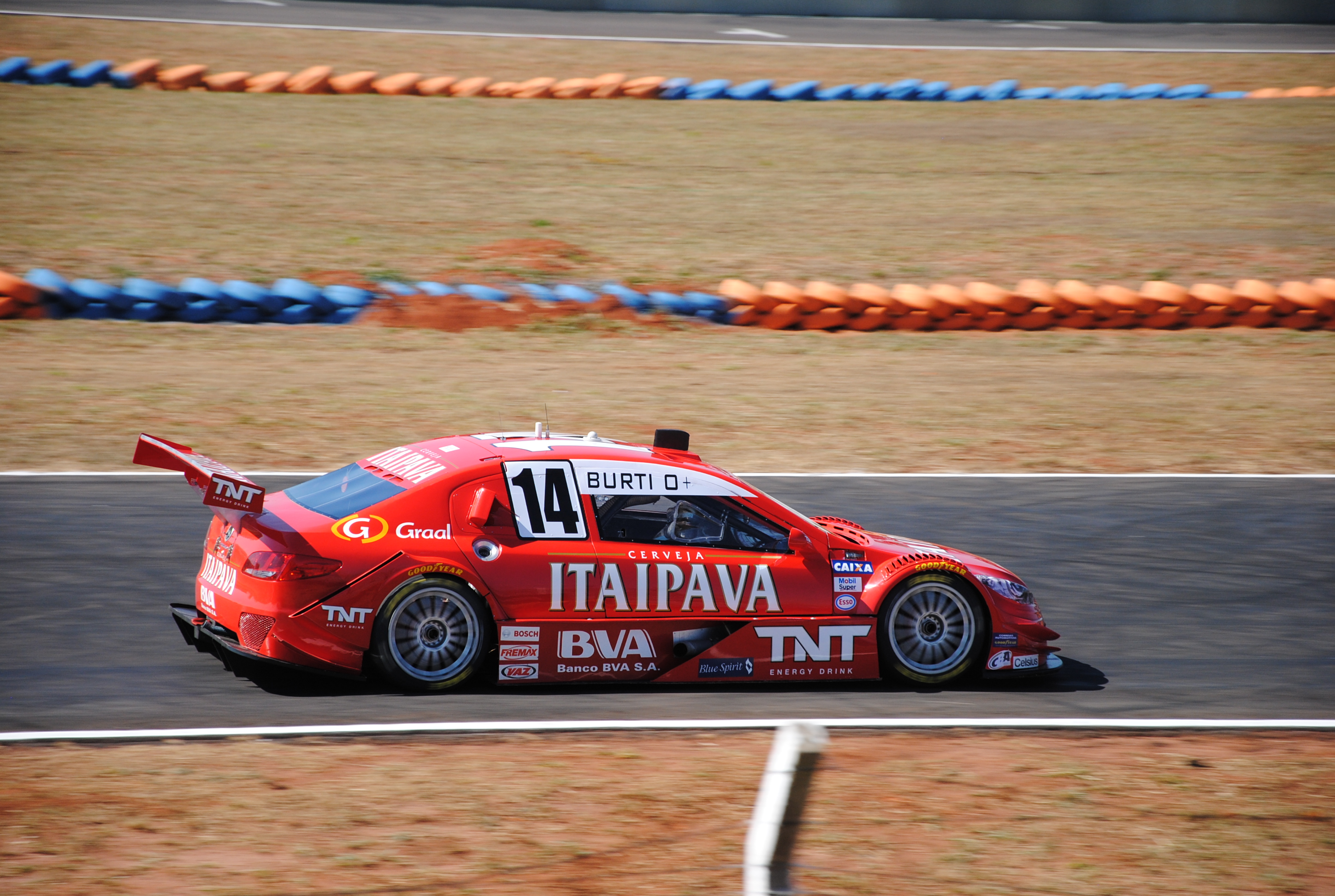
In 2009 and 2011, Peugeot won the Stock Car V8 championship with Cacá Bueno (here Luciano Burti)

Peugeot entered the British Touring Car Championship in 1992, preparing 405's for former champion Robb Gravett. The team was run in-house from the company's UK factory in Coventry. The 405 never won a race despite promising results in its four seasons of competition, before being replaced in 1996 by the 406. Unfortunately Peugeot Sport France did not share any technical data with its British contemporaries, even when requested and the BTCC programme suffered. Peugeot handed the works deal to Motor Sport Developments for 1997 and 98, but wins still eluded the team. With spiralling costs in the series, Peugeot withdrew from the BTCC at the end of 1998.

With his Peugeot 406, Laurent Aïello won the 1997 Super Tourenwagen Cup season.

The Peugeot 306 GTi won the prestigious Spa 24 hours endurance race in 1999 and 2000.

Peugeot won five times the Danish Touringcar Championship, with both the Peugeot 306 -winner in 1999, 2000 and 2001– and the Peugeot 307 winner in 2002 and 2003.

Peugeot has been racing successfully in the Asian Touring Car Series, winning the 2000, 2001, and 2002 championships with the Peugeot 306 GTi.

In 2001, Peugeot entered three 406 Coupés into the British Touring Car Championship to compete with the dominant Vauxhall Astra Coupés. However, the 406 Coupé was not competitive, despite some promise towards the end of the year, notably when Peugeot's Steve Soper led a race only to suffer engine failure in the last few laps. The 406 Coupés were retired at the end of the following year and replaced with the 307—again, uncompetitively—in 2003.

Peugeot has been racing successfully in the Stock Car Brasil series since 2007 and won the 2008, 2009, and 2011 championships. Peugeot Argentina has participated in TC 2000/Super TC 2000, where it has also won championships.

In 2013, the Peugeot 208GTi won a one-two-three at the 24 Hours Nürburgring endurance race.

=== Return to rallying ===
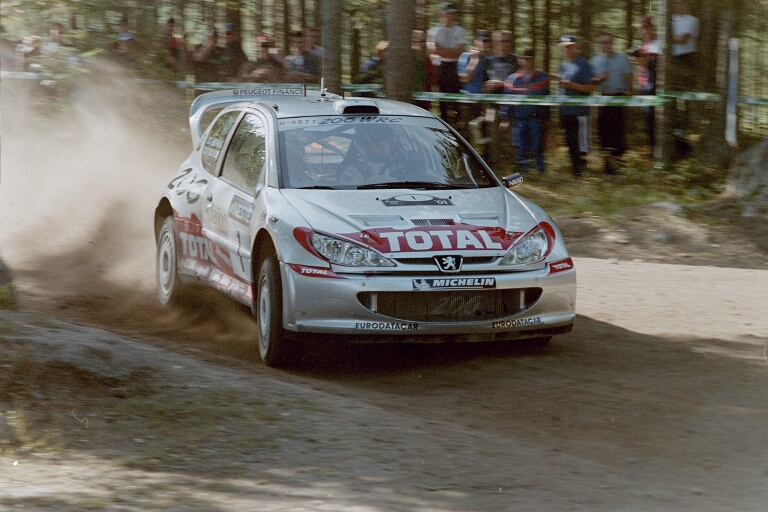
Marcus Grönholm driving the Peugeot 206 WRC to victory at the 2001 Rally Finland.

In 1999, Peugeot Sport returned to the World Rally Championship with the Peugeot 206 WRC, under the guidance of director Corrado Provera. The car debuted at the Tour de Corse, with François Delecour driving one car and Gilles Panizzi and Marcus Grönholm sharing the second car over the remaining events. Grönholm finished fourth on the car's third event, Rally Finland, before Panizzi finished second on Rallye Sanremo.

In 2000, Grönholm gave the car its first victory at Rally Sweden, and followed this up with wins in New Zealand, Finland and Australia on his way to the Drivers’ championship. Panizzi won in Corsica and Sanremo, giving Peugeot the Manufacturers’ championship.

In 2001, Didier Auriol joined the team, replacing Delecour as the main driver alongside Grönholm. Panizzi and Harri Rovanperä also drove additional cars for the team on selected events. Rovanperä won round two in Sweden, as Grönholm struggled with retirements during the first half of the year. Auriol won in Spain, Grönholm won in Finland, Australia and Great Britain, and Panizzi won in Italy. The team retained their manufacturers’ crown, even though Grönholm was the best placed driver in the drivers’ standings, in fourth place. Rovanperä was fifth, Auriol eighth and Panizzi ninth.

For 2002, the team signed Richard Burns, the 2001 champion, from Subaru, replacing Auriol in the team. Grönholm won round two in Sweden, before Panizzi took back-to-back wins in France and Spain. Grönholm won the next event in Cyprus, before he and Burns were disqualified for a technical infringement in Argentina. Grönholm won again in Finland, while Panizzi won his third event of the year in Italy. Grönholm completed back-to-back victories in New Zealand and Australia to take his second drivers’ title. Burns finished the season fifth, ahead of Panizzi and Rovanperä in sixth and seventh. Peugeot were able to take a third consecutive Manufacturers’ title.

The driver lineup remained the same for 2003, with Marlboro joining as title sponsor. Grönholm won in Sweden yet again, and took another two wins in New Zealand and Argentina. Panizzi picked up another win in Spain. Poised to rejoin Subaru in 2004, Burns was ruled out of action ahead of the final round of the season in Great Britain, having suffered a blackout while driving to the event. He was replaced for the event and the 2004 season by Belgian Freddy Loix. Burns finished the season fourth in the standings, ahead of Grönholm in sixth. Peugeot lost its manufacturers crown to Citroën.

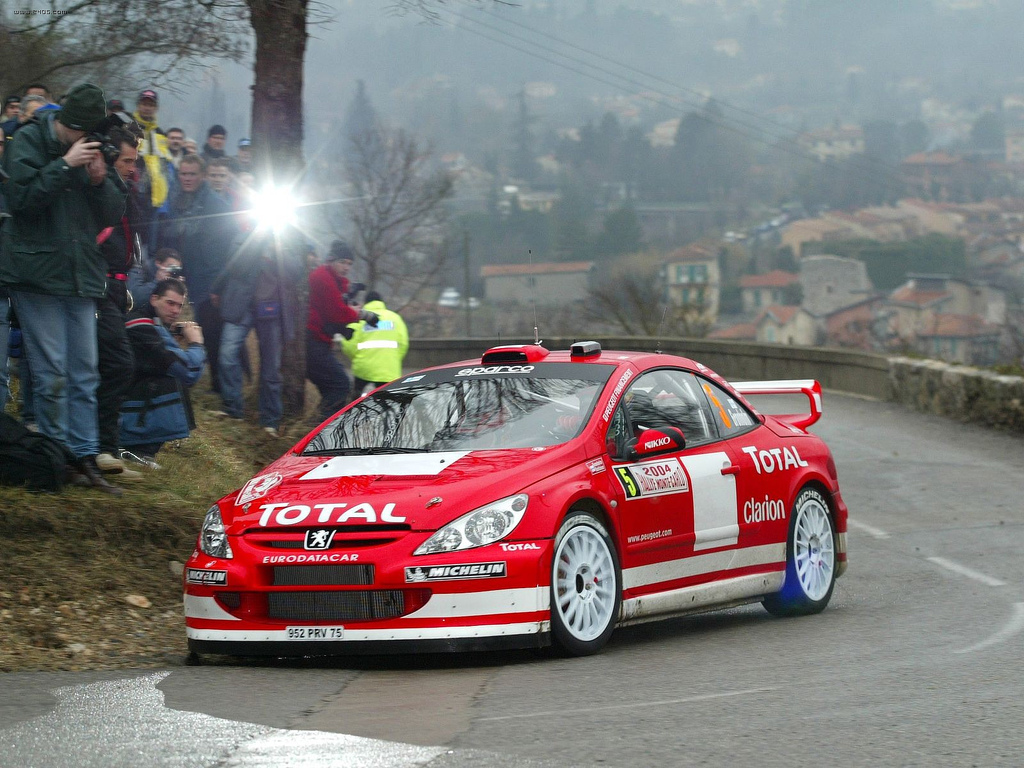
Marcus Grönholm driving the Peugeot 307 WRC on the 2004 Rally Monte Carlo.

Peugeot introduced a new car for the 2004 season, the 307 WRC, which was based upon the coupé cabriolet version of the 307 road car. Having originally not been part of the team at the start of the season, Rovanperä replaced Loix after two rounds in the team's second car alongside Grönholm, who struggled with the new car initially. He took the team's only victory of the season in Finland, and he finished fifth in the standings at the end of the season. Peugeot finished fourth in the manufacturers’ standings.

For 2005, Peugeot signed Markko Märtin from Ford to partner Grönholm. Once again, it took until Grönholm won Rally Finland yet again in August for the team to win. Two rallies later, in Great Britain, Märtin's co-driver Michael Park was killed after the pair's 307 WRC left the road. Märtin subsequently pulled out of the World Rally Championship. Daniel Carlsson and Nicolas Bernardi both filled in for him during the final four events. Grönholm took a second win of the season in Japan, on his way to third in the standings. Peugeot finished second in the manufacturers’ standings. At the end of 2005, PSA Peugeot Citroën withdrew its two teams from the WRC. Citroën took a year out to develop a new car and returned in 2007, but Peugeot did not return to the WRC.

Peugeot Sport created the Peugeot 207 S2000, a rally car built to Super 2000 regulations. Peugeot Sport enter the cars, run by Kronos Racing, in the Intercontinental Rally Challenge (IRC). Peugeot drivers Enrique García-Ojeda, Nicolas Vouilloz and Kris Meeke won the IRC drivers' title in 2007, 2008 and 2009 respectively. It was replaced by 208 T16, which competes under R5 Regulations.

=== Return to sportscars ===
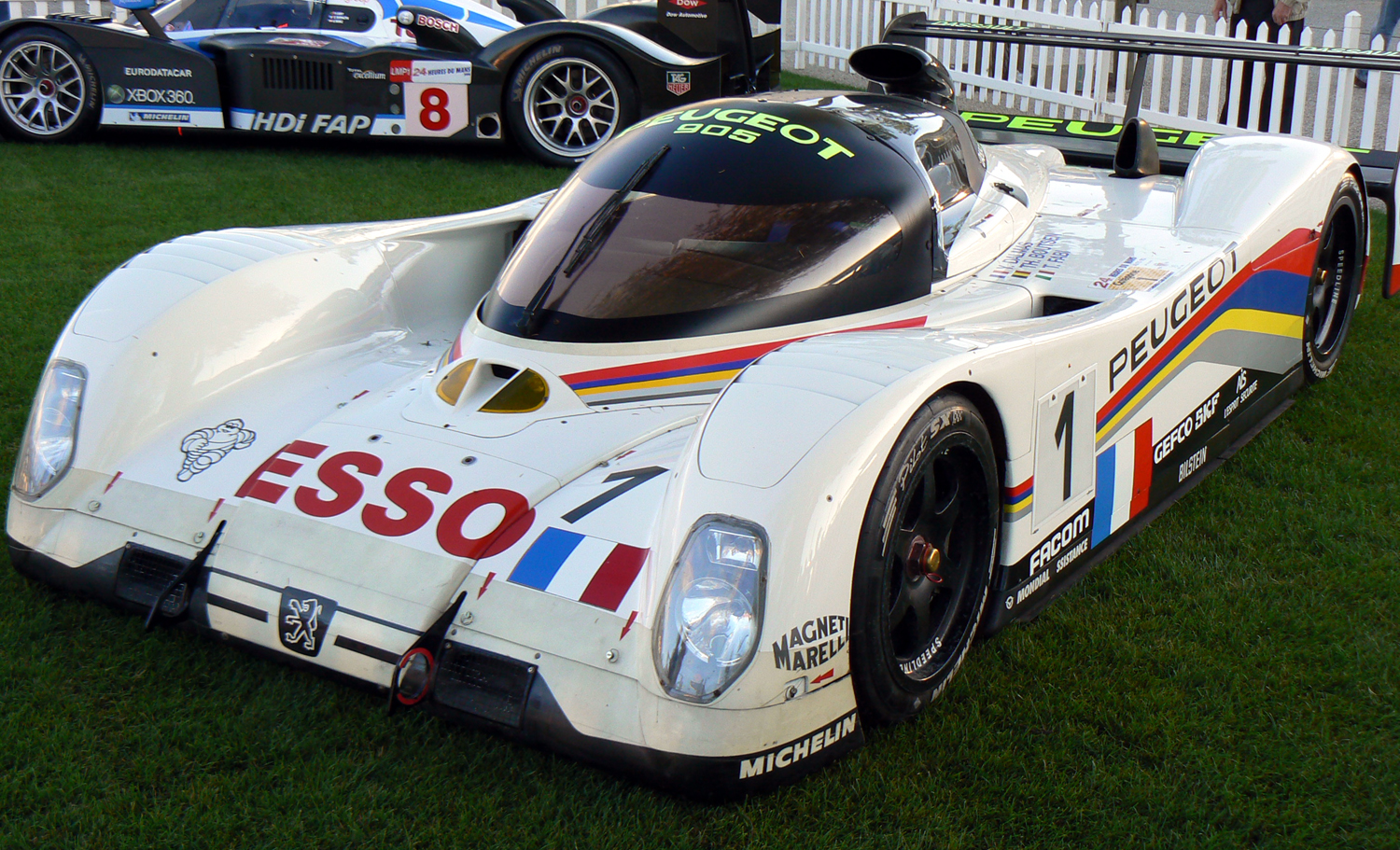
Peugeot 905 won 2 times the 24 Heures du Mans in 1992 and 1993, and the World Sports Car Championship

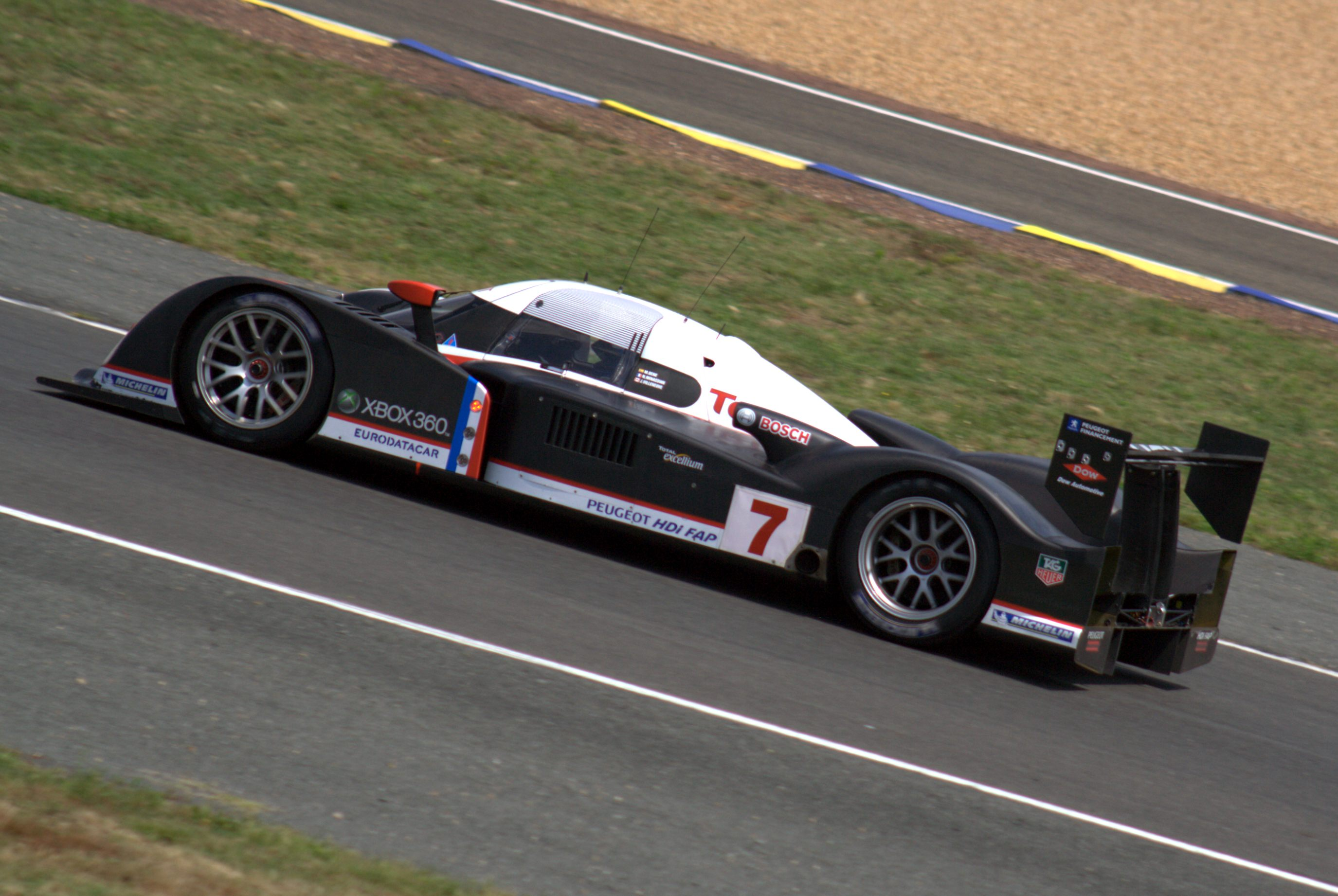
The Peugeot 908 HDi FAP, 2 times winner of the Intercontinental Le Mans Series

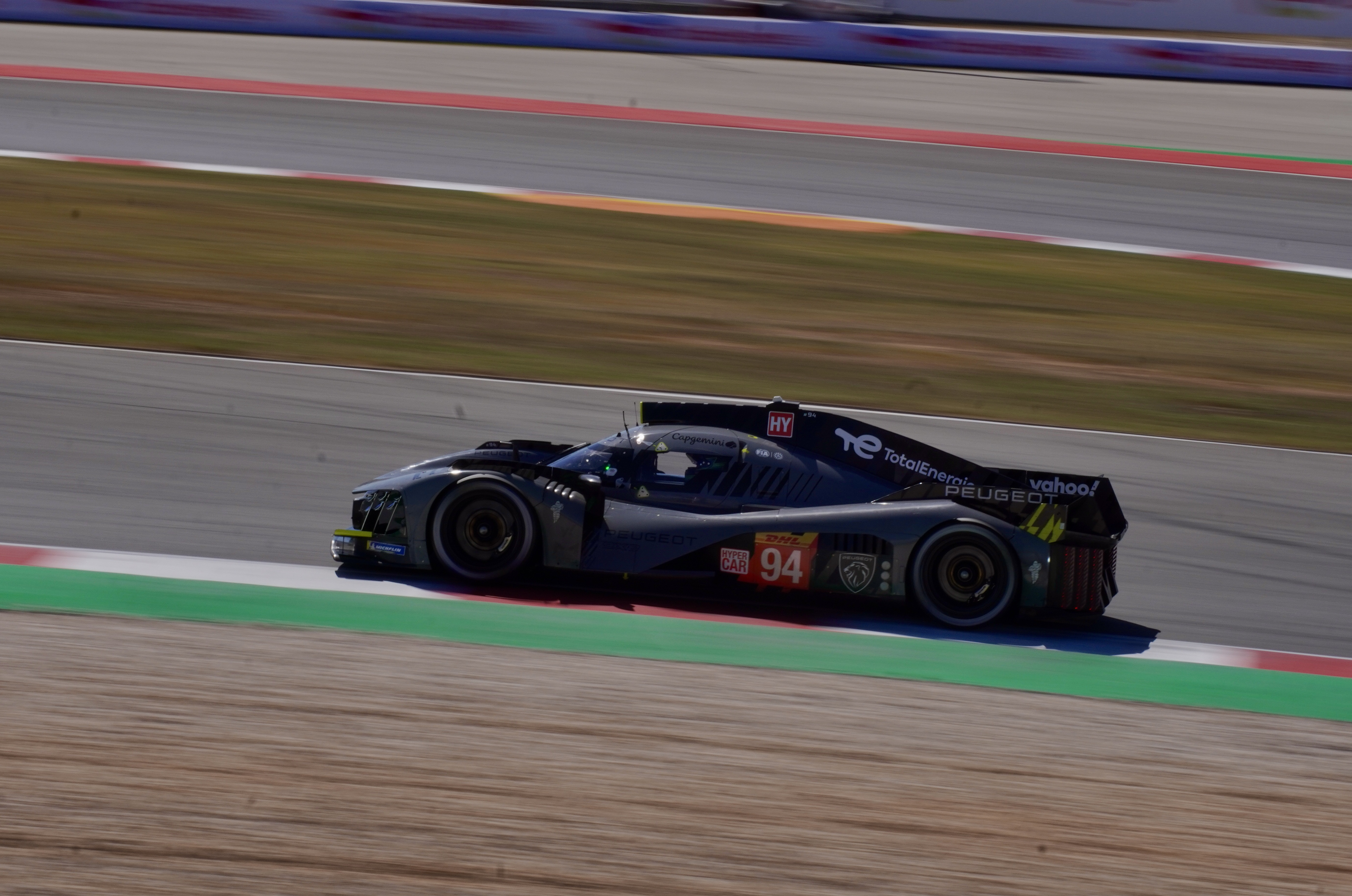
#94 Peugeot 9X8 during the 2023 6 Hours of Portimão

Under the guidance of new director Michel Barge, Peugeot Sport returned to sportscar racing for 2007, taking on the dominant Audi with the Peugeot 908 HDi FAP. The car made its debut at the 2007 1000km of Monza, the opening round of the 2007 Le Mans Series season. The pairing of Marc Gené and Nicolas Minassian took the car to victory. At the 2007 24 Hours of Le Mans, Stéphane Sarrazin took pole position for the team ahead of the Audis. In the race, the #8 car of Sarrazin, Pedro Lamy and Sébastien Bourdais finished second behind the #1 Audi. After Le Mans, Sarrazin and Lamy took the Le Mans Series title for Peugeot.

At the 2008 24 Hours of Le Mans, Peugeot and Sarrazin once again took pole position, locking out the first three places on the grid. In the race, the trio of cars finished in second, third and fifth. In the Le Mans Series, Peugeot lost out to Audi again, Minassian and Gené finishing in second place.

At the beginning of 2009, PSA Peugeot Citroën made Citroën Sport director Olivier Quesnel the director of Peugeot Sport too. At the 2009 24 Hours of Le Mans, Sarrazin set his third consecutive pole position for the team. In the race, the team delivered its first Le Mans victory since 1993, with the trio of David Brabham, Gené and Alexander Wurz winning ahead of the car driven by Franck Montagny, Bourdais and Sarrazin. The team's third car finished the race in sixth position. The team only contested one round of the Le Mans Series season, at Spa as preparation for Le Mans itself.

Peugeot scored a 1–2 finish at the 2010 12 Hours of Sebring. However, reliability problems for all four of the 908s (including Oreca's entry) at the 2010 24 Hours of Le Mans meant that Audi finished 1–2–3 at the race.

At the 2011 12 Hours of Sebring, the older Peugeot 908 HDi FAP owned by Oreca Racing had a surprise win over the factory 908s and Audi R15++s. At the 2011 24 Hours of Le Mans, Peugeot saw itself in a position to win after two of the Audi R18s crashed; only a strong effort from the sole surviving Audi kept Peugeot from winning the race. The winning Audi was only 13 seconds ahead of the second-place Peugeot 908.

On 18 January 2012, Peugeot Sport announced its withdrawal from sportscar racing, citing lowering car sales and the economic downturn as reasons. A return, however, was not ruled out if funds can be procured for the future, but not likely before 2015.

On 13 November 2019 Peugeot announced that they would take part in the 2022 FIA World Endurance Championship in the newly created Hypercar class, which made the brand's return to the sports car racing landscape after an 11-year absence. During the 2020 24 Hours of Le Mans, the CEO of PSA Group Carlos Tavares unveiled renders of the new Peugeot Hypercar, and in December 2020, Peugeot and Total unveiled the powertrain called the Peugeot Hybrid4 (this platform was born in 2012 with the unveil of the 2012 hybrid-spec of the Peugeot 908), with aerodynamics completed in partnership with Ligier. On 8 February 2021, Peugeot revealed a driver line-up consisting of Loic Duval, Jean-Éric Vergne, Mikkel Jensen, Gustavo Menezes, Paul Di Resta, and Kevin Magnussen, as well as James Rossiter as simulator/reserve driver for the WEC 2022 season. Rossiter was later promoted to full-time driver after Magnussen was announced to be driving for the Haas F1 Team in 2022, thus leaving him unavailable for WEC. Rossiter was later replaced by Nico Müller for the final round of 2022 and the 2023 season. Peugeot earned their first podium finish in the WEC at the 2023 6 Hours of Monza.

=== Return to Pikes Peak Hillclimb Race ===
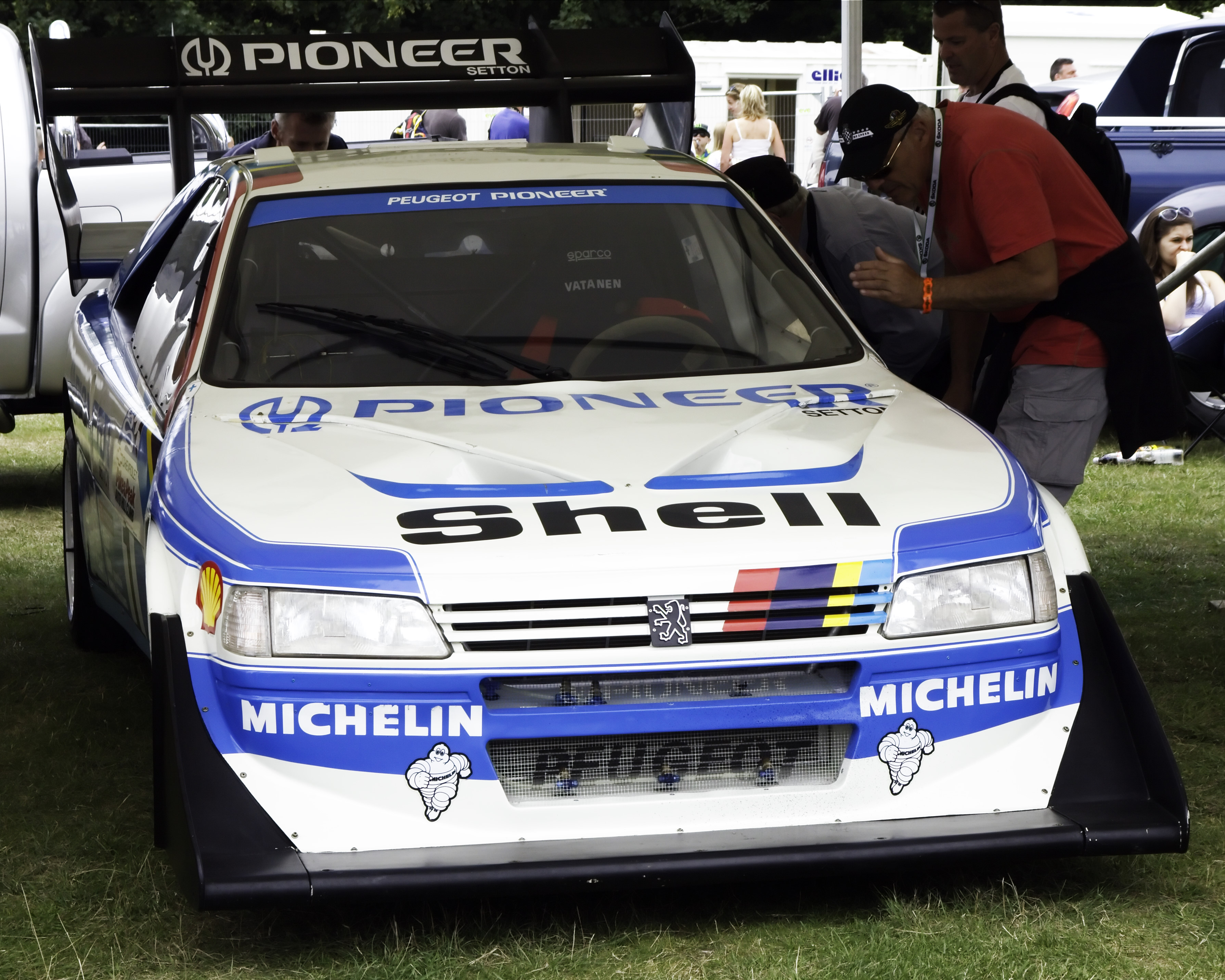
Ari Vatanen's Pikes Peak Peugeot 405

After Ari Vatanen and Bobby Unser, in the late 1980s, won the Pikes Peak Hillclimb Race, Peugeot Sport and Sébastien Loeb decided to unite their respective strengths and go for it.

In April 2013, a 208 T16 was tested by Sébastien Loeb at Mont Ventoux. Loosely based on the shape and design of the production 208, the T16 is a lightweight 875 kg (1,929 lb) vehicle that uses the rear wing from the Peugeot 908, and has a 3.2-litre, twin-turbo V6 engine, developing 875 bhp (652 kW; 887 PS) with the aim of competing at the Pikes Peak International Hill Climb. On 30 June 2013 this car demolished the standing record on Pikes Peak by over a minute and a half, with an overall time of 8:13.878.

== Racecars ==
| Year | Car | Image | Category |
|---|---|---|---|
| 1912 | Peugeot EX3 | | Vanderbilt Cup |
| 1984 | Peugeot 205 Turbo 16 | | Group B |
| 1988 | Peugeot 405 Turbo 16 | | Rally raid |
| 1990 | Peugeot 905 | | Group C1 |
| 1992 | Peugeot 905B Evo | | Group C1 |
| 1995 | Peugeot 405 Signature | | Super Touring |
| 1996 | Peugeot 306 Maxi | | Formula 2 Kit Car |
| 1996 | Peugeot 406 | | Super Touring |
| 1998 | Peugeot 406 M.Y. 1998 | | Super Touring |
| 2000 | Peugeot 206 WRC | | WRC |
| 2001 | BTC-T Peugeot 406 Coupé | | BTC Touring |
| 2003 | BTC-T Peugeot 307 | | BTC Touring |
| 2004 | Peugeot 307 WRC | | WRC |
| 2007 | Peugeot 207 S2000 | | Super 2000 |
| 2007 | Peugeot 908 HDi FAP | | LMP1 |
| 2011 | Peugeot 908 | | LMP1 |
| 2012 | Peugeot 208 R2 | | Group R2 |
| 2014 | Peugeot 208 T16 | | Group R5 |
| 2015 | Peugeot 2008 DKR | | Group T1 |
| 2017 | Peugeot 3008 DKR | | Group T1.2 |
| 2019 | Peugeot 308 Racing Cup | | TCR |
| 2020 | Peugeot 208 Rally4 | | Group Rally4 |
| 2022 | Peugeot 9X8 | | LMH |
| 2024 | Peugeot 308 TCR | | TCR |

== Detailed results ==
=== Formula One (1994–2000) ===
(key)

| Year | Entrant | Chassis | Engine | Tyres | Drivers | 1 | 2 | 3 | 4 | 5 | 6 | 7 | 8 | 9 | 10 | 11 | 12 | 13 | 14 | 15 | 16 | 17 | Points | WCC |
|---|---|---|---|---|---|---|---|---|---|---|---|---|---|---|---|---|---|---|---|---|---|---|---|---|
| 1994 | Marlboro McLaren Peugeot | McLaren MP4/9 | A6 3.5 V10 | G | | BRA | PAC | SMR | MON | ESP | CAN | FRA | GBR | GER | HUN | BEL | ITA | POR | EUR | JPN | AUS | | 42 | 4th |
| 1994 | Marlboro McLaren Peugeot | McLaren MP4/9 | A6 3.5 V10 | G | (Finland) Mika Häkkinen | Ret | Ret | 3 | Ret | Ret | Ret | Ret | 3 | Ret | | 2 | 3 | 3 | 3 | 7 | 12 | | 42 | 4th |
| 1994 | Marlboro McLaren Peugeot | McLaren MP4/9 | A6 3.5 V10 | G | (France) Philippe Alliot | | | | | | | | | | Ret | | | | | | | | 42 | 4th |
| 1994 | Marlboro McLaren Peugeot | McLaren MP4/9 | A6 3.5 V10 | G | (United Kingdom) Martin Brundle | Ret | Ret | 8 | 2 | 11 | Ret | Ret | Ret | Ret | 4 | Ret | 5 | 6 | Ret | Ret | 3 | | 42 | 4th |
| 1995 | Total Jordan Peugeot | Jordan 195 | A10 3.0 V10 | G | | BRA | ARG | SMR | ESP | MON | CAN | FRA | GBR | GER | HUN | BEL | ITA | POR | EUR | PAC | JPN | AUS | 21 | 6th |
| 1995 | Total Jordan Peugeot | Jordan 195 | A10 3.0 V10 | G | (Brazil) Rubens Barrichello | Ret | Ret | Ret | 7 | Ret | 2 | 6 | 11 | Ret | 7 | 6 | Ret | 11 | 4 | Ret | Ret | Ret | 21 | 6th |
| 1995 | Total Jordan Peugeot | Jordan 195 | A10 3.0 V10 | G | (United Kingdom) Eddie Irvine | Ret | Ret | 8 | 5 | Ret | 3 | 9 | Ret | 9 | 13 | Ret | Ret | 10 | 6 | 11 | 4 | Ret | 21 | 6th |
| 1996 | Benson & Hedges Total Jordan Peugeot | Jordan 196 | A12 EV5 3.0 V10 | G | | AUS | BRA | ARG | EUR | SMR | MON | ESP | CAN | FRA | GBR | GER | HUN | BEL | ITA | POR | JPN | | 22 | 5th |
| 1996 | Benson & Hedges Total Jordan Peugeot | Jordan 196 | A12 EV5 3.0 V10 | G | (Brazil) Rubens Barrichello | Ret | Ret | 4 | 5 | 5 | Ret | Ret | Ret | 9 | 4 | 6 | 6 | Ret | 5 | Ret | 9 | | 22 | 5th |
| 1996 | Benson & Hedges Total Jordan Peugeot | Jordan 196 | A12 EV5 3.0 V10 | G | (United Kingdom) Martin Brundle | Ret | 12 | Ret | 6 | Ret | Ret | Ret | 6 | 8 | 6 | 10 | Ret | Ret | 4 | 9 | 5 | | 22 | 5th |
| 1997 | Benson & Hedges Jordan Peugeot | Jordan 197 | A14 3.0 V10 | G | | AUS | BRA | ARG | SMR | MON | ESP | CAN | FRA | GBR | GER | HUN | BEL | ITA | AUT | LUX | JPN | EUR | 33 | 5th |
| 1997 | Benson & Hedges Jordan Peugeot | Jordan 197 | A14 3.0 V10 | G | (Germany) Ralf Schumacher | Ret | Ret | 3 | Ret | Ret | Ret | Ret | 6 | 5 | 5 | 5 | Ret | Ret | 5 | Ret | 9 | Ret | 33 | 5th |
| 1997 | Benson & Hedges Jordan Peugeot | Jordan 197 | A14 3.0 V10 | G | (Italy) Giancarlo Fisichella | Ret | 8 | Ret | 4 | 6 | 9 | 3 | 9 | 7 | 11 | Ret | 2 | 4 | 4 | Ret | 7 | 11 | 33 | 5th |
| 1998 | Gauloises Prost Peugeot | Prost AP01 | A16 3.0 V10 | B | | AUS | BRA | ARG | SMR | ESP | MON | CAN | FRA | GBR | AUT | GER | HUN | BEL | ITA | LUX | JPN | | 1 | 9th |
| 1998 | Gauloises Prost Peugeot | Prost AP01 | A16 3.0 V10 | B | (France) Olivier Panis | 9 | Ret | 15 | 11 | 16 | Ret | Ret | 11 | Ret | Ret | 15 | 12 | DNS | Ret | 12 | 11 | | 1 | 9th |
| 1998 | Gauloises Prost Peugeot | Prost AP01 | A16 3.0 V10 | B | (Italy) Jarno Trulli | Ret | Ret | 11 | Ret | 9 | Ret | Ret | Ret | Ret | 10 | 12 | Ret | 6 | 13 | Ret | 12 | | 1 | 9th |
| 1999 | Gauloises Prost Peugeot | Prost AP02 | A18 3.0 V10 | B | | AUS | BRA | SMR | MON | ESP | CAN | FRA | GBR | AUT | GER | HUN | BEL | ITA | EUR | MAL | JPN | | 9 | 7th |
| 1999 | Gauloises Prost Peugeot | Prost AP02 | A18 3.0 V10 | B | (France) Olivier Panis | Ret | 6 | Ret | Ret | Ret | 9 | 8 | 13 | 10 | 6 | 10 | 13 | 11 | 9 | Ret | Ret | | 9 | 7th |
| 1999 | Gauloises Prost Peugeot | Prost AP02 | A18 3.0 V10 | B | (Italy) Jarno Trulli | Ret | Ret | Ret | 7 | 6 | Ret | 7 | 9 | 7 | Ret | 8 | 12 | Ret | 2 | Ret | Ret | | 9 | 7th |
| 2000 | Gauloises Prost Peugeot | Prost AP03 | A20 3.0 V10 | B | | AUS | BRA | SMR | GBR | ESP | EUR | MON | CAN | FRA | AUT | GER | HUN | BEL | ITA | USA | JPN | MAL | 0 | NC |
| 2000 | Gauloises Prost Peugeot | Prost AP03 | A20 3.0 V10 | B | (France) Jean Alesi | Ret | Ret | Ret | 10 | Ret | 9 | Ret | Ret | 14 | Ret | Ret | Ret | Ret | 12 | Ret | Ret | 11 | 0 | NC |
| 2000 | Gauloises Prost Peugeot | Prost AP03 | A20 3.0 V10 | B | (Germany) Nick Heidfeld | 9 | Ret | Ret | Ret | 16 | EX | 8 | Ret | 12 | Ret | 12 | Ret | Ret | Ret | 9 | Ret | Ret | 0 | NC |

=== 24 Hours of Le Mans ===
| Year | Entrant | No. | Car | Drivers | Class | Laps | Pos. | Class Pos. |
|---|---|---|---|---|---|---|---|---|
| 1991 | (France) Peugeot Talbot Sport | 5 | Peugeot 905 | (France) Philippe Alliot (Italy) Mauro Baldi (France) Jean-Pierre Jabouille | Category 1 | 22 | DNF | DNF |
| 1991 | (France) Peugeot Talbot Sport | 6 | Peugeot 905 | (France) Yannick Dalmas (France) Pierre-Henri Raphanel (Finland) Keke Rosberg | Category 1 | 68 | DNF | DNF |
| 1992 | (France) Peugeot Talbot Sport | 1 | Peugeot 905B Evo 1-bis | (United Kingdom) Mark Blundell (France) Yannick Dalmas (United Kingdom) Derek Warwick | Category 1 | 352 | 1st | 1st |
| 1992 | (France) Peugeot Talbot Sport | 2 | Peugeot 905B Evo 1-bis | (France) Philippe Alliot (Italy) Mauro Baldi (France) Jean-Pierre Jabouille | Category 1 | 345 | 3rd | 3rd |
| 1992 | (France) Peugeot Talbot Sport | 31 | Peugeot 905B Evo 1-bis | (France) Alain Ferté (Belgium) Eric van de Poele (Austria) Karl Wendlinger | Category 1 | 208 | DNF | DNF |
| 1993 | (France) Peugeot Talbot Sport | 1 | Peugeot 905 Evo 1C | (Belgium) Thierry Boutsen (France) Yannick Dalmas (Italy) Teo Fabi | Category 1 | 374 | 2nd | 2nd |
| 1993 | (France) Peugeot Talbot Sport | 2 | Peugeot 905 Evo 1C | (France) Philippe Alliot (Italy) Mauro Baldi (France) Jean-Pierre Jabouille | Category 1 | 367 | 3rd | 3rd |
| 1993 | (France) Peugeot Talbot Sport | 3 | Peugeot 905 Evo 1C | (France) Christophe Bouchut (Australia) Geoff Brabham (France) Éric Hélary | Category 1 | 375 | 1st | 1st |
| 2007 | (France) Team Peugeot Total | 7 | Peugeot 908 HDi FAP | (Spain) Marc Gené (France) Nicolas Minassian (Canada) Jacques Villeneuve | LMP1 | 338 | DNF | DNF |
| 2007 | (France) Team Peugeot Total | 8 | Peugeot 908 HDi FAP | (France) Sébastien Bourdais (Portugal) Pedro Lamy (France) Stéphane Sarrazin | LMP1 | 359 | 2nd | 2nd |
| 2008 | (France) Team Peugeot Total | 7 | Peugeot 908 HDi FAP | (Spain) Marc Gené (France) Nicolas Minassian (Canada) Jacques Villeneuve | LMP1 | 381 | 2nd | 2nd |
| 2008 | (France) Team Peugeot Total | 8 | Peugeot 908 HDi FAP | (Portugal) Pedro Lamy (France) Stéphane Sarrazin (Austria) Alexander Wurz | LMP1 | 368 | 5th | 5th |
| 2008 | (France) Peugeot Sport Total | 9 | Peugeot 908 HDi FAP | (Austria) Christian Klien (France) Franck Montagny (Brazil) Ricardo Zonta | LMP1 | 379 | 3rd | 3rd |
| 2009 | (France) Team Peugeot Total | 7 | Peugeot 908 HDi FAP | (Austria) Christian Klien (Portugal) Pedro Lamy (France) Nicolas Minassian | LMP1 | 369 | 6th | 6th |
| 2009 | (France) Team Peugeot Total | 8 | Peugeot 908 HDi FAP | (France) Sébastien Bourdais (France) Franck Montagny (France) Stéphane Sarrazin | LMP1 | 381 | 2nd | 2nd |
| 2009 | (France) Peugeot Sport Total | 9 | Peugeot 908 HDi FAP | (Australia) David Brabham (Spain) Marc Gené (Austria) Alexander Wurz | LMP1 | 382 | 1st | 1st |
| 2010 | (France) Team Peugeot Total | 1 | Peugeot 908 HDi FAP | (United Kingdom) Anthony Davidson (Spain) Marc Gené (Austria) Alexander Wurz | LMP1 | 360 | DNF | DNF |
| 2010 | (France) Team Peugeot Total | 2 | Peugeot 908 HDi FAP | (France) Nicolas Minassian (France) Franck Montagny (France) Stéphane Sarrazin | LMP1 | 264 | DNF | DNF |
| 2010 | (France) Peugeot Sport Total | 3 | Peugeot 908 HDi FAP | (France) Sébastien Bourdais (Portugal) Pedro Lamy (France) Simon Pagenaud | LMP1 | 38 | DNF | DNF |
| 2011 | (France) Peugeot Sport Total | 7 | Peugeot 908 | (United Kingdom) Anthony Davidson (Spain) Marc Gené (Austria) Alexander Wurz | LMP1 | 351 | 4th | 4th |
| 2011 | (France) Peugeot Sport Total | 8 | Peugeot 908 | (France) Nicolas Minassian (France) Franck Montagny (France) Stéphane Sarrazin | LMP1 | 353 | 3rd | 3rd |
| 2011 | (France) Team Peugeot Total | 9 | Peugeot 908 | (France) Sébastien Bourdais (Portugal) Pedro Lamy (France) Simon Pagenaud | LMP1 | 355 | 2nd | 2nd |
| 2023 | (France) Peugeot TotalEnergies | 93 | Peugeot 9X8 | (United Kingdom) Paul di Resta (Denmark) Mikkel Jensen (France) Jean-Éric Vergne | Hypercar | 330 | 8th | 8th |
| 2023 | (France) Peugeot TotalEnergies | 94 | Peugeot 9X8 | (France) Loïc Duval (United States) Gustavo Menezes (Switzerland) Nico Müller | Hypercar | 312 | 27th | 12th |
| 2024 | (France) Peugeot TotalEnergies | 93 | Peugeot 9X8 | (Denmark) Mikkel Jensen (Switzerland) Nico Müller (France) Jean-Éric Vergne | Hypercar | 309 | 12th | 12th |
| 2024 | (France) Peugeot TotalEnergies | 94 | Peugeot 9X8 | (United Kingdom) Paul di Resta (France) Loïc Duval (Belgium) Stoffel Vandoorne | Hypercar | 309 | 11th | 11th |
| 2025 | (France) Peugeot TotalEnergies | 93 | Peugeot 9X8 | (United Kingdom) Paul di Resta (Denmark) Mikkel Jensen (France) Jean-Éric Vergne | Hypercar | 379 | 16th | 16th |
| 2025 | (France) Peugeot TotalEnergies | 94 | Peugeot 9X8 | (France) Loïc Duval (Denmark) Malthe Jakobsen (Belgium) Stoffel Vandoorne | Hypercar | 384 | 11th | 11th |
| 2026 | (France) Peugeot TotalEnergies | 93 | Peugeot 9X8 | (New Zealand) Nick Cassidy (United Kingdom) Paul di Resta (Belgium) Stoffel Vandoorne | Hypercar | 376 | 12th | 12th |
| 2026 | (France) Peugeot TotalEnergies | 94 | Peugeot 9X8 | (France) Loïc Duval (Denmark) Malthe Jakobsen (France) Théo Pourchaire | Hypercar | 377 | 11th | 11th |

=== World Sportscar Championship (1991–1992) ===
| Year | Class | Entrants | | Chassis Engine | Tire | No | Results | | | | | | | | Championship | |
| Year | Class | Entrants | | Chassis Engine | Tire | No | 1 | 2 | 3 | 4 | 5 | 6 | 7 | 8 | Pts. | Pos. |
|---|---|---|---|---|---|---|---|---|---|---|---|---|---|---|---|---|
| 1991 | Group; C | (France) | Peugeot Sport Total | Peugeot 905; SA35-A2 3.5 L V10 | M | | (Japan); SUZ | (Italy); MON | (United Kingdom); SIL | (France); LMS | (Germany); NUR | (France); MAG | (Mexico); MEX | (Japan); AUT | 76 | 2nd |
| 1991 | Group; C | (France) | Peugeot Sport Total | Peugeot 905; SA35-A2 3.5 L V10 | M | 5 | 1 | 8 | 6 | Ret | Ret | 2 | 2 | 4 | 76 | 2nd |
| 1991 | Group; C | (France) | Peugeot Sport Total | Peugeot 905; SA35-A2 3.5 L V10 | M | 6 | Ret | Ret | Ret | Ret | Ret | 1 | 1 | Ret | 76 | 2nd |
| 1992 | Group; C | (France) | Team Peugeot Total | Peugeot 905 evo SA35-A2 3.5 L V10 | M | | (Italy); MON | (United Kingdom); SIL | (France); LMS | (United Kingdom); DON | (Japan); SUZ | (France); MAG | | | 115 | 1st |
| 1992 | Group; C | (France) | Team Peugeot Total | Peugeot 905 evo SA35-A2 3.5 L V10 | M | 1 | 2 | 1 | 1 | 2 | 1 | 5 | | | 115 | 1st |
| 1992 | Group; C | (France) | Team Peugeot Total | Peugeot 905 evo SA35-A2 3.5 L V10 | M | 2 | Ret | Ret | 3 | 1 | 3 | 1 | | | 115 | 1st |

=== Intercontinental Le Mans Cup for Manufacturers (2010–2011) ===
| Year | Class | Entrants | | Chassis Engine | Tire | No | Results | | | | | | | Championship | |
| Year | Class | Entrants | | Chassis Engine | Tire | No | 1 | 2 | 3 | 4 | 5 | 6 | 7 | Pts. | Pos. |
|---|---|---|---|---|---|---|---|---|---|---|---|---|---|---|---|
| 2010 | LMP1 | (France) | Peugeot Sport Total | Peugeot 908 HDi FAP; HDi 5.5 L Turbo V12 (diesel) | M | | (United Kingdom); SIL | (United States); ATL | (China); ZHU | | | | | 140 | 1st |
| 2010 | LMP1 | (France) | Peugeot Sport Total | Peugeot 908 HDi FAP; HDi 5.5 L Turbo V12 (diesel) | M | 1/7/2 | 1 | 2 | 4 | | | | | 140 | 1st |
| 2010 | LMP1 | (France) | Peugeot Sport Total | Peugeot 908 HDi FAP; HDi 5.5 L Turbo V12 (diesel) | M | 4/8/1 | 2 | 1 | 1 | | | | | 140 | 1st |
| 2011 | LMP1 | (France) | Team Peugeot Total | Peugeot 908; HDi 3.7 L Turbo V8 (diesel) | M | | (United States); SEB | (Belgium); SPA | (France); LMS | (Italy); IMO | (United Kingdom); SIL | (United States); ATL | (China); ZHU | 113 | 1st |
| 2011 | LMP1 | (France) | Team Peugeot Total | Peugeot 908; HDi 3.7 L Turbo V8 (diesel) | M | 7 | 1 | 1 | 2 | 1 | 1 | 1 | 1 | 113 | 1st |
| 2011 | LMP1 | (France) | Team Peugeot Total | Peugeot 908; HDi 3.7 L Turbo V8 (diesel) | M | 8 | 3 | 2 | 3 | 2 | 8 | 2 | 2 | 113 | 1st |

=== FIA World Endurance Championship (2022–) ===
| Year | Class | Entrants | | Chassis Engine | Tire | No | Results | | | | | | | | Championship | |
| Year | Class | Entrants | | Chassis Engine | Tire | No | 1 | 2 | 3 | 4 | 5 | 6 | 7 | 8 | Pts. | Pos. |
|---|---|---|---|---|---|---|---|---|---|---|---|---|---|---|---|---|
| 2022 | Hypercar | (France) | Peugeot TotalEnergies | Peugeot 9X8; X6H 2.6 L Turbo V6 | M | | | | | | | | | | | |
| 2022 | Hypercar | (France) | Peugeot TotalEnergies | Peugeot 9X8; X6H 2.6 L Turbo V6 | M | | (United States); SEB | (Belgium); SPA | (France); LMS | (Italy); MNZ | (Japan); FUJ | (Bahrain); BHR | | | 42 | 4th |
| 2022 | Hypercar | (France) | Peugeot TotalEnergies | Peugeot 9X8; X6H 2.6 L Turbo V6 | M | 93 | | | | Ret | 4 | Ret | | | 42 | 4th |
| 2022 | Hypercar | (France) | Peugeot TotalEnergies | Peugeot 9X8; X6H 2.6 L Turbo V6 | M | 94 | | | | 4 | 5 | 4 | | | 42 | 4th |
| 2023 | Hypercar | (France) | Peugeot TotalEnergies | Peugeot 9X8; X6H 2.6 L Turbo V6 | M | | | | | | | | | | | |
| 2023 | Hypercar | (France) | Peugeot TotalEnergies | Peugeot 9X8; X6H 2.6 L Turbo V6 | M | | (United States); SEB | (Portugal); POR | (Belgium); SPA | (France); LMS | (Italy); MNZ | (Japan); FUJ | (Bahrain); BHR | | 67 | 5th |
| 2023 | Hypercar | (France) | Peugeot TotalEnergies | Peugeot 9X8; X6H 2.6 L Turbo V6 | M | 93 | 9 | 7 | 8 | 6 | 3 | 8 | 9 | | 67 | 5th |
| 2023 | Hypercar | (France) | Peugeot TotalEnergies | Peugeot 9X8; X6H 2.6 L Turbo V6 | M | 94 | NC | 5 | 9 | 9 | 11 | 7 | 8 | | 67 | 5th |
| 2024 | Hypercar | (France) | Peugeot TotalEnergies | Peugeot 9X8; X6H 2.6 L Turbo V6 | M | | | | | | | | | | | |
| 2024 | Hypercar | (France) | Peugeot TotalEnergies | Peugeot 9X8; X6H 2.6 L Turbo V6 | M | | (Qatar); QAT | (Italy); IMO | (Belgium); SPA | (France); LMS | (Brazil); SAP | (United States); COTA | (Japan); FUJ | (Bahrain); BHR | 57 | 6th |
| 2024 | Hypercar | (France) | Peugeot TotalEnergies | Peugeot 9X8; X6H 2.6 L Turbo V6 | M | 93 | DSQ | 9 | 10 | 12 | 8 | 12 | 4 | 3 | 57 | 6th |
| 2024 | Hypercar | (France) | Peugeot TotalEnergies | Peugeot 9X8; X6H 2.6 L Turbo V6 | M | 94 | 15 | 15 | 14 | 11 | 16 | Ret | 8 | Ret | 57 | 6th |
| 2025 | Hypercar | (France) | Peugeot TotalEnergies | Peugeot 9X8; X6H 2.6 L Turbo V6 | M | | | | | | | | | | | |
| 2025 | Hypercar | (France) | Peugeot TotalEnergies | Peugeot 9X8; X6H 2.6 L Turbo V6 | M | | (Qatar); QAT | (Italy); IMO | (Belgium); SPA | (France); LMS | (Brazil); SAP | (United States); COTA | (Japan); FUJ | (Bahrain); BHR | 84 | 7th |
| 2025 | Hypercar | (France) | Peugeot TotalEnergies | Peugeot 9X8; X6H 2.6 L Turbo V6 | M | 93 | 9 | 9 | 11 | 15 | 7 | 4 | 2 | 9 | 84 | 7th |
| 2025 | Hypercar | (France) | Peugeot TotalEnergies | Peugeot 9X8; X6H 2.6 L Turbo V6 | M | 94 | 12 | 12 | Ret | 10 | 6 | 3 | 10 | 10 | 84 | 7th |
| 2026 | Hypercar | (France) | Peugeot TotalEnergies | Peugeot 9X8; X6H 2.6 L Turbo V6 | M | | | | | | | | | | | |
| 2026 | Hypercar | (France) | Peugeot TotalEnergies | Peugeot 9X8; X6H 2.6 L Turbo V6 | M | | (Italy); IMO | (Belgium); SPA | (France); LMS | (Brazil); SAP | (United States); COTA | (Japan); FUJ | (Spain); BAR | (Italy); MON | 42 | 7th |
| 2026 | Hypercar | (France) | Peugeot TotalEnergies | Peugeot 9X8; X6H 2.6 L Turbo V6 | M | 93 | 16 | 7 | 12 | 16 | 16 | Ret | 12 | 8 | 42 | 7th |
| 2026 | Hypercar | (France) | Peugeot TotalEnergies | Peugeot 9X8; X6H 2.6 L Turbo V6 | M | 94 | 12 | Ret | 11 | 14 | 10 | 6 | 13 | 4 | 42 | 7th |

* Season still in progress.

Key
Individual race results
| Gold | Winner |
| Silver | 2nd place |
| Bronze | 3rd place |
| Green | Points finish |
| Bold text | Class pole winner |

== See also ==
- Team Peugeot Total
