= Talbot Type T4 "Minor" =

Talbot(-Lago) "Minor" Type T4
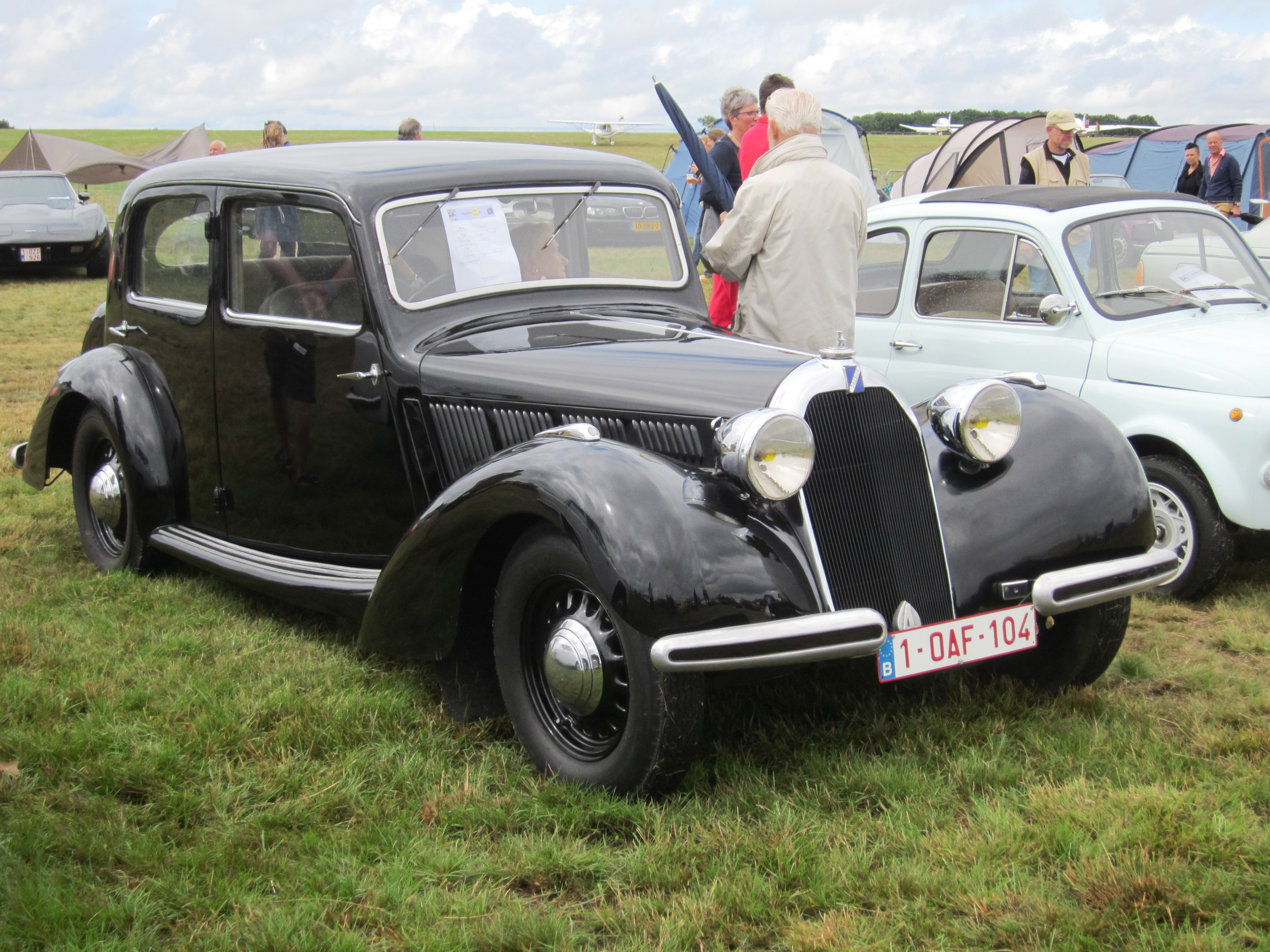

Overview
- Manufacturer: Automobiles Talbot-Darracq S.A.
- Production: 1937–1940
- Designer: Walter Becchia (1896 – 1976)

Body and chassis
- Class: Mid-size car
- Body style: 4-seater, 4-door saloon also offered as a bare chassis
- Layout: FR layout

Powertrain
- Engine: 2323 cc I4
- Transmission: 4-speed manual "Aphone" mechanical transmission

Dimensions
- Wheelbase: 2,950 mm (116.1 in)

The Talbot "Minor" Type T4 (known outside France as the Talbot-Lago "Minor" Type T4) was a mid-sized executive car produced by the French Talbot company between 1937 and 1940.

Under the conventions of the time, the car would also have been called "Talbot 13CV" reflecting its engine size, but the "13CV" name was not normally applied, possibly because of adverse superstition concerning the number "13".

== Background ==
As part of the backwash from the bankruptcy and break-up of the Anglo-French Sunbeam-Talbot-Darracq combine in 1935, the French part of the business was purchased by Tony Lago, an auto-industry entrepreneur born in Venice, but who had built much of his auto-industry career during the 1920s in England. The registered name of the company Lago now owned was "Automobiles Talbot-Darracq S.A.", but in the English speaking world it is generally known as "Talbot-Lago". The cars themselves were badged in their home market simply as Talbots, which had been the badge worn by products of the predecessor company since 1922 when the "-Darracq" suffix had been dropped from the names used for the cars in France.

Although in 1935 Lago's company continued building Talbot models from the pre-bankruptcy period, he rapidly replaced them with a range of lightweight, sporting six-cylinder-engined cars, centred round the Talbot Baby and the slightly less sporting "voitures de tourisme" such as the Talbot Major and the smaller Talbot Cadette. The passenger car range was complemented by racing cars and a high-profile motor racing programme. The passenger cars and racing cars were designed by a fellow Italian expatriate called Walter Becchia, who during 1939 would transfer to Citroën and play a key role in the development of the Citroën 2CV.

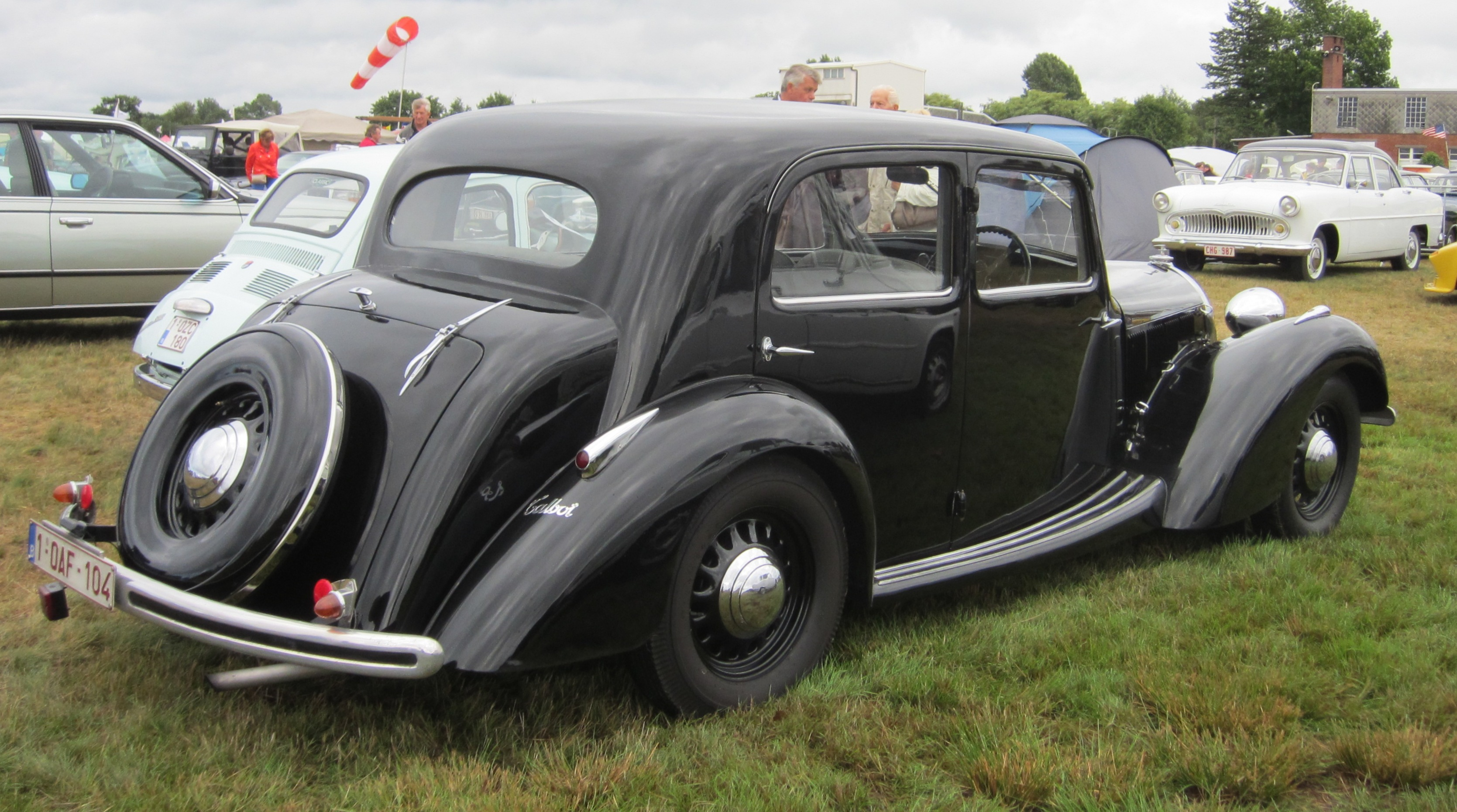

== Launch ==
The launch of a four-cylinder model, the Talbot "Minor" Type T4, at the Paris Motor Show in October 1937 represented something of a departure for Talbot and a surprise for industry observers. The new model broadened the range and would enable Talbot to compete slightly lower down the market place hierarchy, against models such as the Hotchkiss Type 864 and the Salmson S4.

== Chassis ==
The car took its chassis from the manufacturers' existing sports saloon, the Talbot Baby. Beccia designed a new four door steel body which closely resembled the larger body of the six-cylinder Talbots Cadette and Major. For traditionally minded customers preferring to select their own car body, the Minor could also be ordered in bare chassis form. The steering wheel and driving seat were on the right-hand side of the car, following a convention that had been almost universal among European auto-makers twenty years earlier, but which was now seen as rather old fashioned in countries where traffic drove on the right. The wheels at the front were independently suspended subject to a transverse leaf spring, while the back wheels were attached using a rigid axle suspended from longitudinally mounted leaf springs.

== Engine ==
The four-cylinder, 2.3 L (2,323 cc) engine placed the car in the 13 CV car tax band. Fed via overhead valves by a single Stromberg 22 carburetor, it produced a claimed maximum output of 62 hp (46 kW) at 4,000 rpm.

== Commercial ==
At launch the Minor was priced at 42,500 Francs for a car with the manufacturer's standard steel body. In bare chassis form the price quoted was 35,000 Francs. An obvious competitor was the standard "Cabourg"-bodied Type 864 from Hotchkiss which came with a listed price of 39,900 Francs (or 29,500 Francs in bare chassis form). The Hotchkiss, with its claimed 68 hp (50 kW) of power from an engine of virtually identical dimensions, appears the more aggressively priced, but neither car was small enough to challenge the volume auto-makers in terms of unit sales.

The Talbot Minor continued in production for several months after the declaration of war in September 1939, and even after November 1939 Talbot were delivering cars to the French army for use as staff cars, but during the first part of 1940 the Talbot Suresnes plant was converted to war production.
