= Talbot Lago Record =

Talbot-Lago Record Type T26
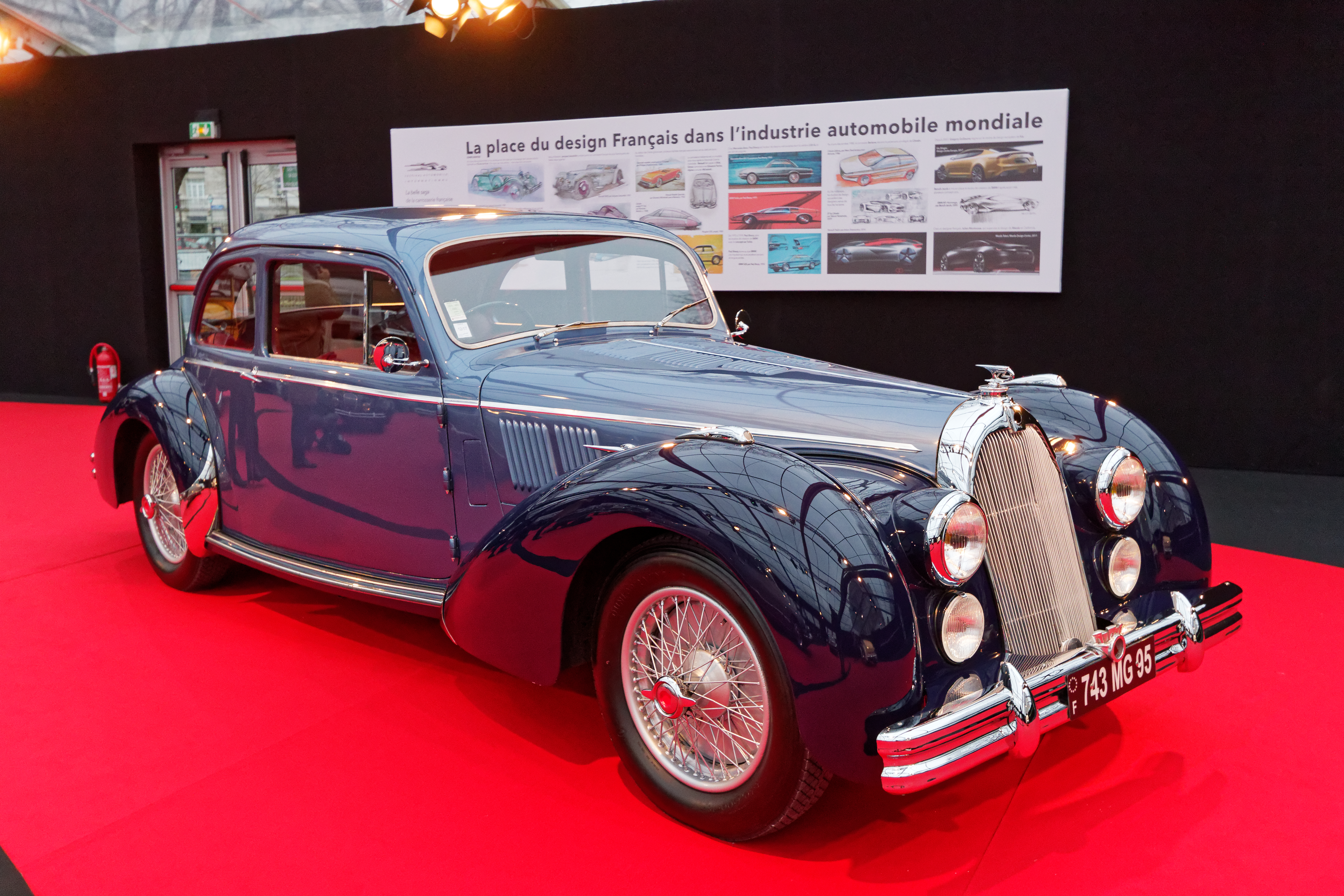

Overview
- Manufacturer: Automobiles Talbot-Darracq S.A.
- Production: 1946–1953 (less than 590 units)

Body and chassis
- Class: executive car
- Body style: 2 door "Coach, Coach Surprofilé", Cabriolet or 4-door sedan/saloon various coachbuilt versions listed
- Layout: FR layout

Powertrain
- Engine: 4482cc (170hp or 190hp (few units))
- Transmission: 4-speed manual Wilson transmission

Dimensions
- Wheelbase: 3,125 mm (123.0 in)
- Height: 1,500 mm (59.1 in)

The Talbot Lago Record Type T26 was a large, six-cylinder executive car launched by the French Talbot company in 1946. In the context of the company's protracted financial collapse, the last T26s were probably those produced during 1953.

The factory offered four body styles: a 4-door sedan, a convertible, a 2-door coach, and a 2-door "Surprofilé" coach.

Many coachbuilders, eager to satisfy an affluent clientele, crafted bespoke bodies: Saoutchik, Dubos Frères, Graber, Figoni & Falaschi, Veth & Zoon, Antem, and others. However, the unfavorable economic climate significantly limited the production of these unique models.

A few rare T26 Record models were equipped by the factory with the Grand Sport engine (190 hp, three Zenith Stromberg EX-32 carburetors, perforated camshafts, Alpax cylinder head, etc.): these were the Talbot Lago T26 Record Sport models. (Not to be confused with the Talbot Lago Grand Sport).

== Background and launch ==
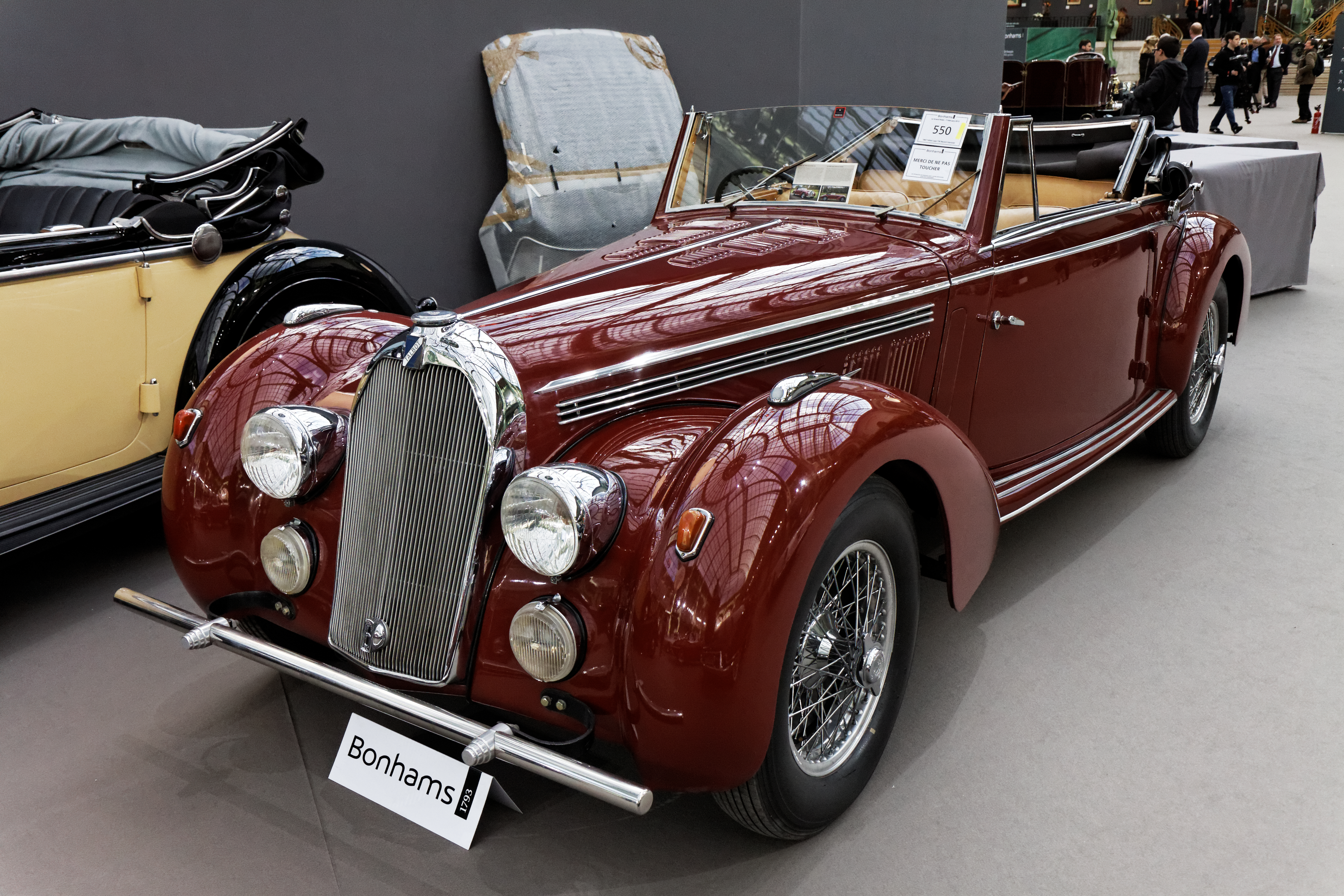
Talbot Lago T26 Record cabriolet

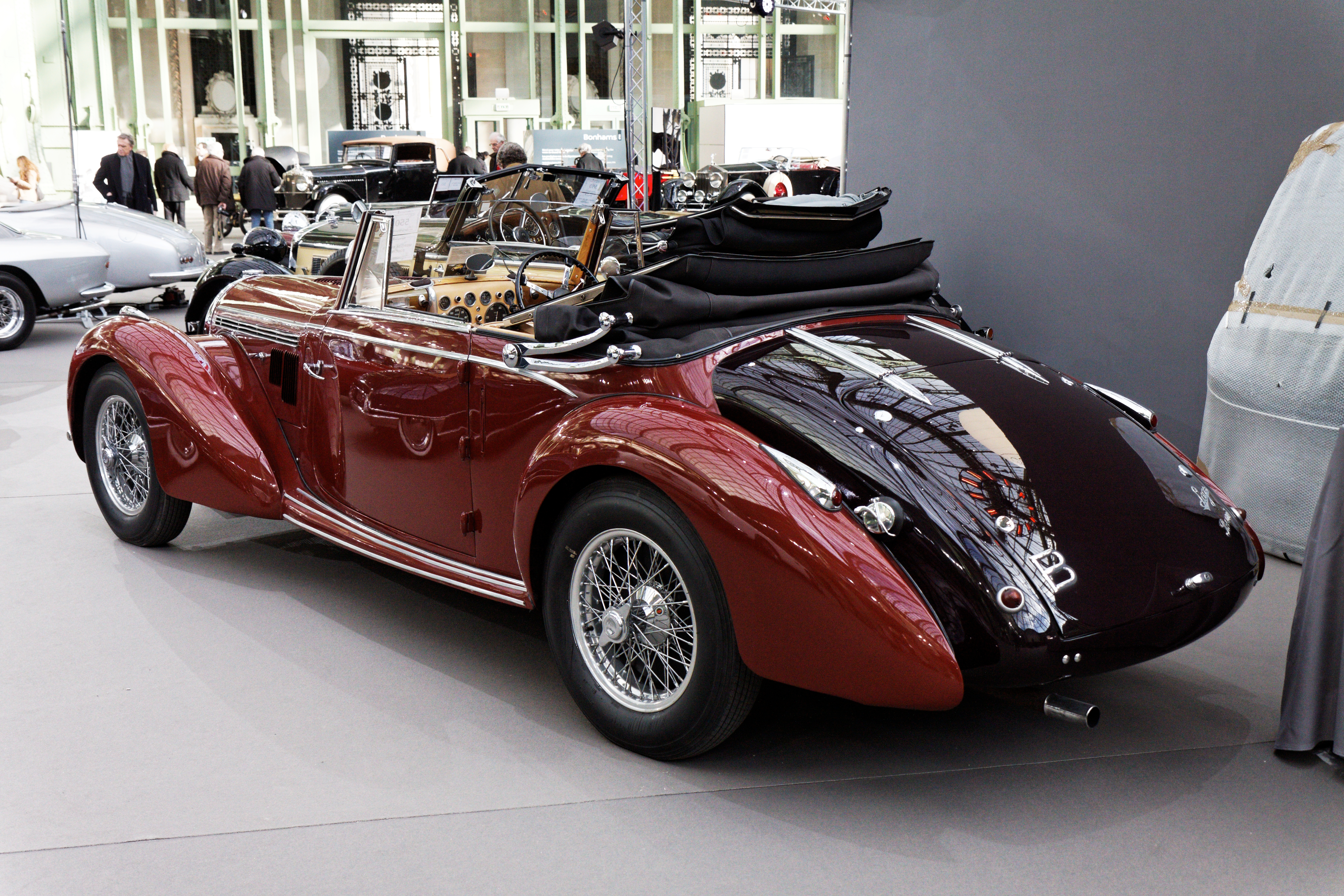
Talbot Lago T26 Record cabriolet rear view

As part of the backwash from the bankruptcy and break-up of the Anglo-French Sunbeam-Talbot-Darracq combine in 1935, the French part of the business was purchased by Tony Lago, an auto-industry entrepreneur and engineer born in Venice, but who had built much of his auto-industry career during the 1920s in England. The registered name of the company Lago now owned was "Automobiles Talbot-Darracq S.A.", but in the English speaking world it is generally known as "Talbot-Lago". The cars themselves were badged in their home market simply as Talbots, using the badge worn by products of the predecessor company since 1922 (when the "-Darracq" suffix had been dropped from the names used for the cars in France). Nevertheless, after 1945, sources even in France frequently used some form of the "Talbot-Lago" name combination.

After acquiring the company in 1935, Lago rapidly developed a range of executive and sporting cars with engine sizes ranging from 2.0 to 4.0 litres. The passenger car range was complemented by racing cars and a high-profile motor racing programme. The Talbot Lago-Record Type T26 launched in 1946, relatively quickly after the end of the Second World War, closely resembled models from the 1930s such as the Talbot Major and Talbot Baby and benefited from the reputation Talbots had built up in the prewar years, though the economic conditions made it unrealistic to produce the range of standard and special-bodied Talbots that had been a feature of the previous decade. The company's star engineer, Walter Becchia, transferred to Citroën at the start of the war, but Tony Lago was joined in 1942 by another exceptional engineering talent, Carlo Marchetti, and from then the two of them were working on the twin-camshaft 4483 cc six-cylinder unit that would lie at the heart of the Talbot T26.

The French government that came to power in 1945 had a strong belief in political control of the economy. In addition to creating a taxation regime which savagely penalised cars with engine sizes above 2 litres, the government also introduced in January 1946 the so-called Pons Plan, under which different French automakers were told by government what car types they might build. Since government also controlled materials supplies – notably steel supplies – the Pons Plan could not be ignored. Talbot were not forbidden to build cars, but they, along with Hotchkiss and Delahaye-Delage were restricted to a class entitled by the bureaucrats "véhicules de classe exceptionnelle" – high-class vehicles. Plan implementation was at its most rigid in 1946, and in that year Talbot received government authorisation for the construction of an initial batch of 125 cars, provided the cars were exported.

The Talbot Lago-Record Type T26 was first presented in public in 1946.

== The car ==
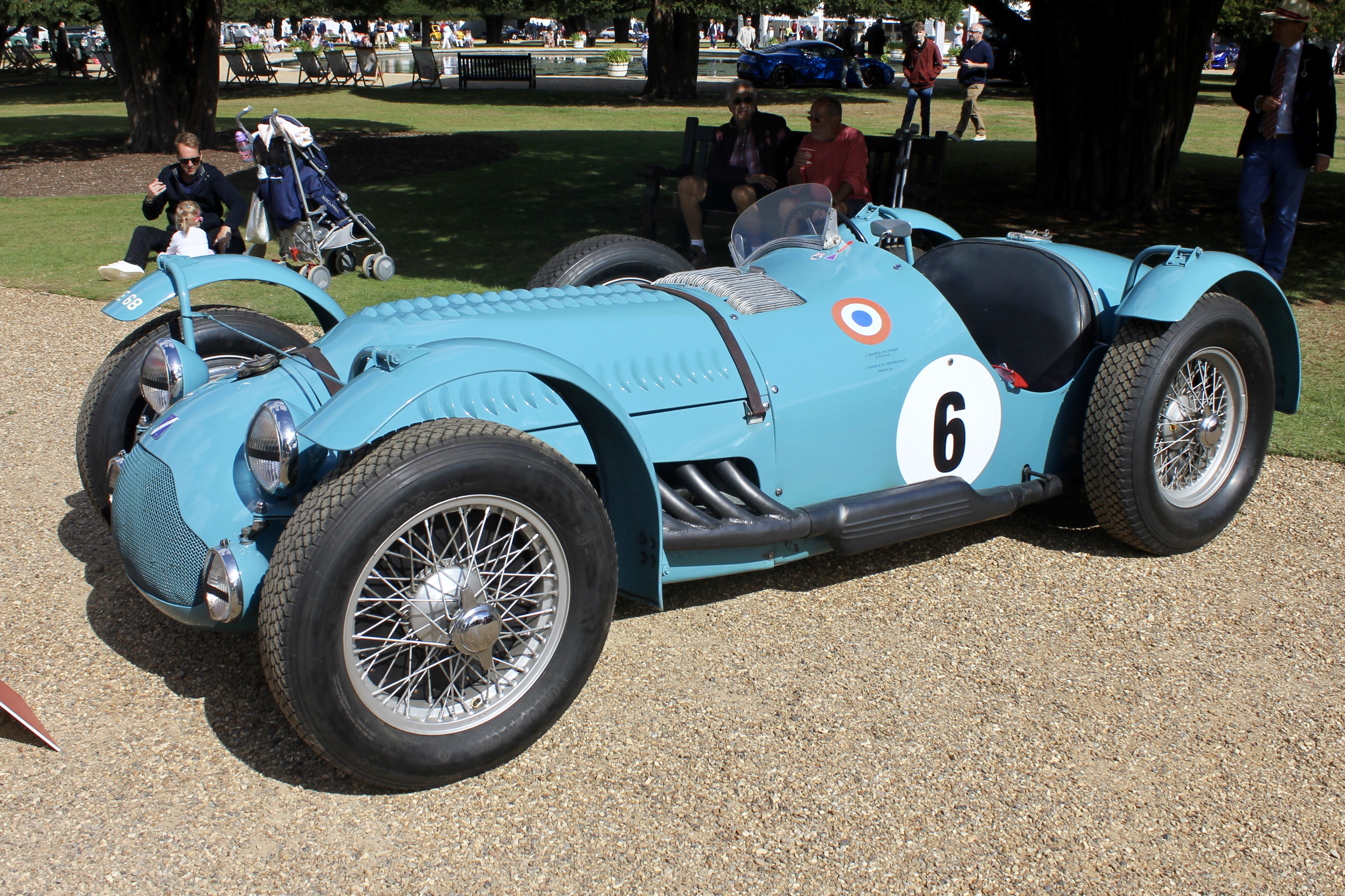
1950 Talbot Lago T26 GS race car, at the 2019 Concours of Elegance, Hampton Court Palace

The Talbot Lago Record T26 was a large car with a fiscal horsepower of 26 CV and a claimed actual power output of 170 hp, delivered to the rear wheels via a four-speed Wilson pre-selector gear box, and supporting a claimed top speed of 170 km/h (105 mph). Almost all the Talbot sedans sold during the late 1940s came with Talbot bodies, constructed in the manufacturer's extensive workshops, and the car was commonly sold as a two door "coach" or four-door sedan, but a two-door cabriolet was also offered. There were also a few coachbuilt specials produced with bodywork by traditionalist firms such as Graber.

== New bodies for 1952 ==
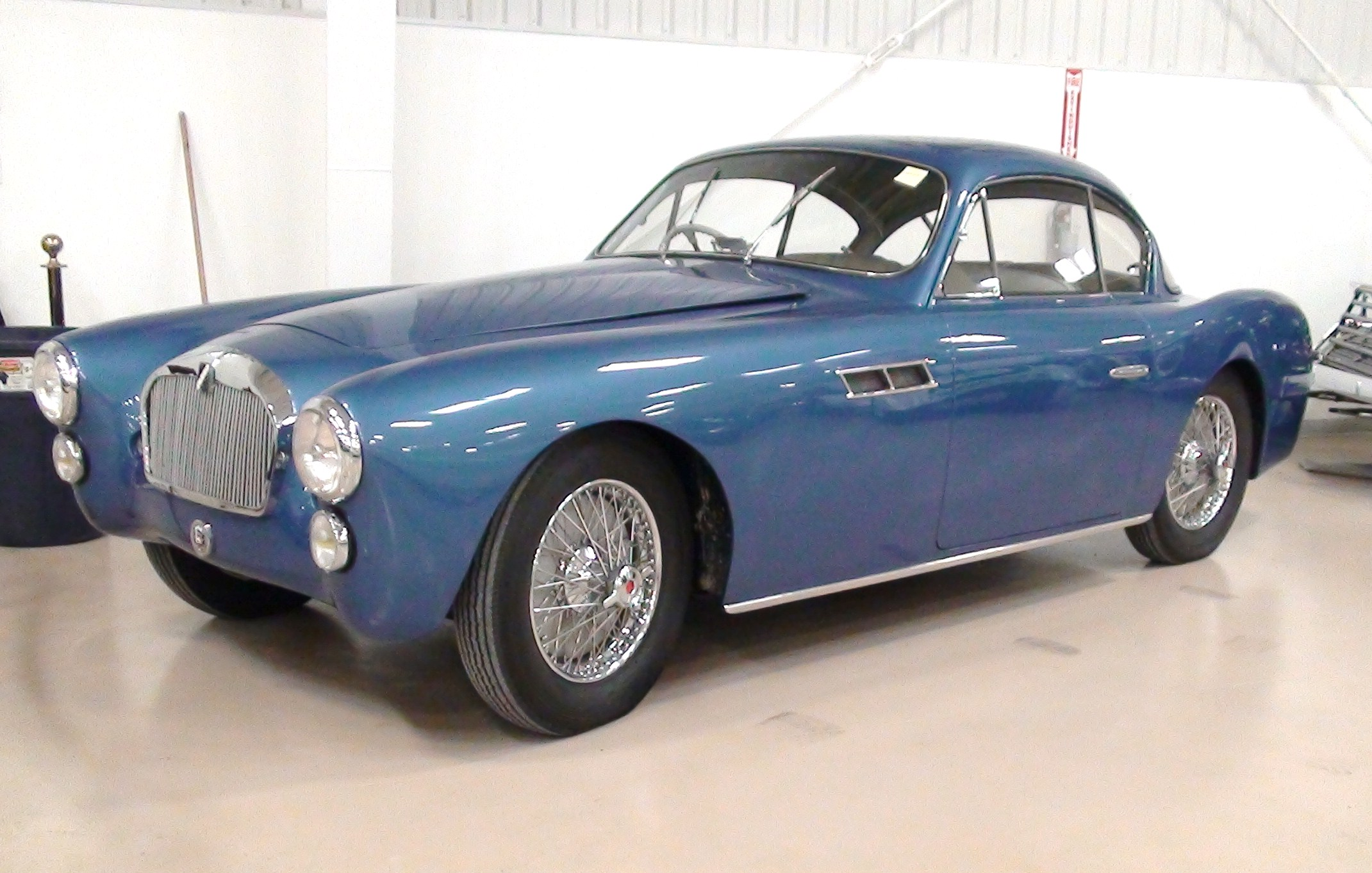
The ponton-bodied Talbot-Lago T26 GSL

In 1951, as reports of the company's financial difficulties intensified, a new ponton format body was exhibited. The new body was designed by Carlo Delaisse and built by Facel-Métallon. A shrunken version of this shape was also used on the Talbot-Lago T14 LS, introduced in 1955. The wheelbases were carried over from the earlier models. Although in many ways strikingly modern, the new car featured a two-piece front windscreen in place of the single flat screen of its predecessor, presumably reflecting the difficulties at the time of combining the strength of a windscreen with curved glass at an acceptable price and quality. The new car’s large rear window was itself replaced by a larger three-piece "panoramic" wrap around back window as part of a first face-lift a year later, in time for the 1952 Paris Motor Show. The engine specification was unchanged, as was the claimed top speed of 170 km/h (106 mph) even though the new body was some 100 kg heavier than the old.

== Commercial ==
The advertised price for a standard steel-bodied Talbot Record T26 sedan in the spring of 1948 was 1,250,000 Francs. Neither the French car market nor currency stability were yet re-established following the disruption of the war, and as a top end model the Talbot was short of direct competitors that might be invoked for comparison purposes, as French luxury automakers from before the war struggled to find a role in the postwar world. A few levels lower down in the pecking order, the Ford V8 was advertised at the 1947 Paris Motor show with a price of 330,750 Francs, while the six-cylinder version of the Citroën 15-Six was advertised at 330,220 Francs for those able to contemplate buying a new car. A Talbot T26 buyer would therefore need to find roughly four times the price of these six-cylinder sedans from the top end of the mainstream ranges. Five years later, at the 1952 Paris Motor show, a standard steel-bodied version of the T26, now with am imposing modern body, was advertised at 2,250,000 Francs. Ford's venerable V8 had been replaced by the Ford Vedette, priced at 935,000 Francs while the price of a six-cylinder version of the Citroën 15-Six had risen to 829,920 Francs.

Even though the Talbot's price had not risen at the same rate as the less exalted six-cylinder sedans offered in France, it remained firmly out of reach for all but a handful of potential purchasers: T26 sales could be reckoned, at best, in hundreds. Sales data for the T26 in isolation have not been identified, but the T26 was the manufacturer's principal model throughout this period. The total production for the Talbot plant at Suresnes tell their own story. In 1950 433 cars were produced. That fell to 80 in 1951, 34 in 1952 and 17 in 1953. Of the 17 Talbots produced in 1953, 13 were T26s and four were examples of its four-cylinder sibling (launched in 1951 with a revival for the pre-war "Talbot Baby" name).
