= Talbot Baby =

- 1938 Talbot-Lago T15 Cabriolet

Overview
- Manufacturer: Automobiles Talbot-Darracq S.A.
- Also called: Talbot Baby 15CV/17CV/23CV; Talbot-Lago Baby (esp. after 1951)
- Production: 1936–1940; 1951–1953

Body and chassis
- Class: Executive car
- Body style: 2-door roadster 2-door 2+2 coupe 2-door cabriolet also offered in bare chassis configuration
- Layout: FR layout

Powertrain
- Engine: 1936–40: 15CV: 2696 cc OHV I6; 17CV: 2996 cc OHV I6; 23CV: 3996 cc OHV I6; 1951–53: 2690 cc OHV I4; 2693 cc OHV I6
- Transmission: 4-speed manual with the option of Wilson "pre-selector" transmission

Dimensions
- Wheelbase: 1936–40: 2,950 mm (116.1 in); 1951–53: 3,125 mm (123.0 in)

The Talbot Baby is a six-cylinder executive sporting car launched by the French Talbot company in 1936. The three standard body types offered were a "coach" (two-door four-seater sedan/saloon), a two-door four-seater "cabriolet" and a two-door two-seater "cabriolet". The Baby was one of the first new models to appear after the French part of the Anglo-French Sunbeam-Talbot-Darracq combine was purchased, in 1935, by auto-entrepreneur Tony Lago. Production slowed with the onset of war and had ended completely by mid-1942 when the manufacturer's Suresnes plant was converted for war production.

The "Talbot Baby" name was revived in June 1951 for a four-cylinder version of the company's newly rebodied T26 model, but in the context of the company's protracted financial collapse very few of the post-war Baby models were produced, with just four manufactured during 1953, which was the model's final year in production.

== Background and launch ==
As part of the backwash from the bankruptcy and break-up of the Anglo-French Sunbeam-Talbot-Darracq combine in 1935, the French part of the business was purchased by Tony Lago, an auto-industry entrepreneur and engineer born in Venice, but who had built much of his auto-industry career during the 1920s in England. The registered name of the company Lago now owned was "Automobiles Talbot-Darracq S.A.", but in the English-speaking world it is generally known as "Talbot-Lago". The cars themselves were sold in their home market at this stage as Talbots, using the badge worn by products of the predecessor company since 1922 (when the "-Darracq" suffix had been dropped from the names used in France). Nevertheless, after 1945, sources even in France increasingly use some form of the "Talbot-Lago" name combination.

After acquiring the company in 1935, Lago rapidly developed a range of executive and sporting cars. The passenger car range was complemented by racing cars and a high profile motor racing programme.

The Talbot Baby was first presented in public in 1936.

== The chassis ==
The chassis, with its 2,950 mm (116.1 in) wheelbase, was effectively a shortened version of the 3,200 mm (126.0 in) chassis provided for the manufacturer's full-size "Cadette" and "Major" sedans/saloons. The name "Baby" does not alter the fact that even these shortened chassis Talbots were substantial automobiles by the standards of the time and place.

The steering wheel and driving seat were on the right-hand side of the car, following convention that had been almost universal among European auto-makers twenty years earlier, but which was now seen as rather old-fashioned in countries where traffic drove on the right. The wheels at the front were independently suspended subject to a transverse leaf spring, while the back wheels were attached using a rigid axle suspended from longitudinally mounted leaf springs. Power was delivered to the rear wheels via a four-speed mechanical gear-box with the option at extra cost (of 4,200 Francs in 1937) of a Wilson pre-selector gear box.

== The engines ==
The Talbot Baby of the 1930s was powered by six-cylinder engines, with a choice between a 3.0 L (2,996 cc) and a 4.0 L (3,996 cc) unit, both sharing the same 104.5 mm cylinder stroke, but differentiated by a cylinder bore (diameter) of 78 or 90 mm. The two engine sizes corresponded with the 17CV and 23CV car tax bands, and the cars are therefore sometimes simply known, using the convention common at the time, as the Talbot Baby 17CV and the Talbot Baby 23CV. A year later, at the 1937 Paris Motor Show, the range of available engines was extended with the introduction of the Talbot Baby 15CV (Talbot Baby-Quinze), sharing its wheelbase and body configurations with the other cars in the range, but with the cylinder bore further reduced. This version of the engine displaced 2.7 L (2,696 cc), placing it in the 15CV car tax band. Maximum power outputs for the 15CV, 17CV and 23CV engines were quoted respectively at 75 hp (55 kW), 90 hp (66 kW), and 105 hp (77 kW). Talbot made a point of measuring maximum usable power not at maximum engine speed but at approximately 90 percent of it, so that an engine spinning at maximum rpm would presumably have produced a little more power than the maxima quoted by the company.

In the standard "coach" steel-bodied two-door sedan/saloon the top speeds for the 15CV, 17CV and 23CV powered versions of the Baby were respectively 130, 135, and 145 km/h (81, 84, and 90 mph), with higher maxima quoted in respect of cars with light-weight coach-built bodies.

== The bodies ==
The standard body for the Baby was a two-door four-seater steel-bodied sports saloon. A car thus equipped was priced in 1937 at between 56,940 and 72,800 francs according to the specified engine. The reduction in wheelbase when compared with the Talbot Cadette came at the expense of the passenger cabin, leaving the overall silhouette looking elegantly long in the nose, so that the straight-six engines might be comfortably accommodated. From the outside it was hard, with a standard-bodied car, to determine whether it was a 15CV, 17Cv or 23CV Baby. Most obviously, the 15CV car came with disc wheels featuring a circle of simple perforations round the outer edge, while the more powerful Babys came with spoked wheels: it was, however, a simple matter to replace the wheels.

Cars could also be ordered in bare chassis format for customers wishing to make their own arrangements for a coachbuilt body. The bare chassis prices in 1937 ranged from 42,120 to 58,030 francs according to engine size.

The other standard bodies advertises were four or two-seater cabriolets, the four-seaters priced in 1937 at approximately 6,000 francs above the steel-bodied saloons, and the two-seaters even more expensive at 72,700 or 83,610 francs for a 17CV or 23CV two-seater cabriolet. At this stage, the 15CV Baby was not listed as available with a two-seater cabriolet body.

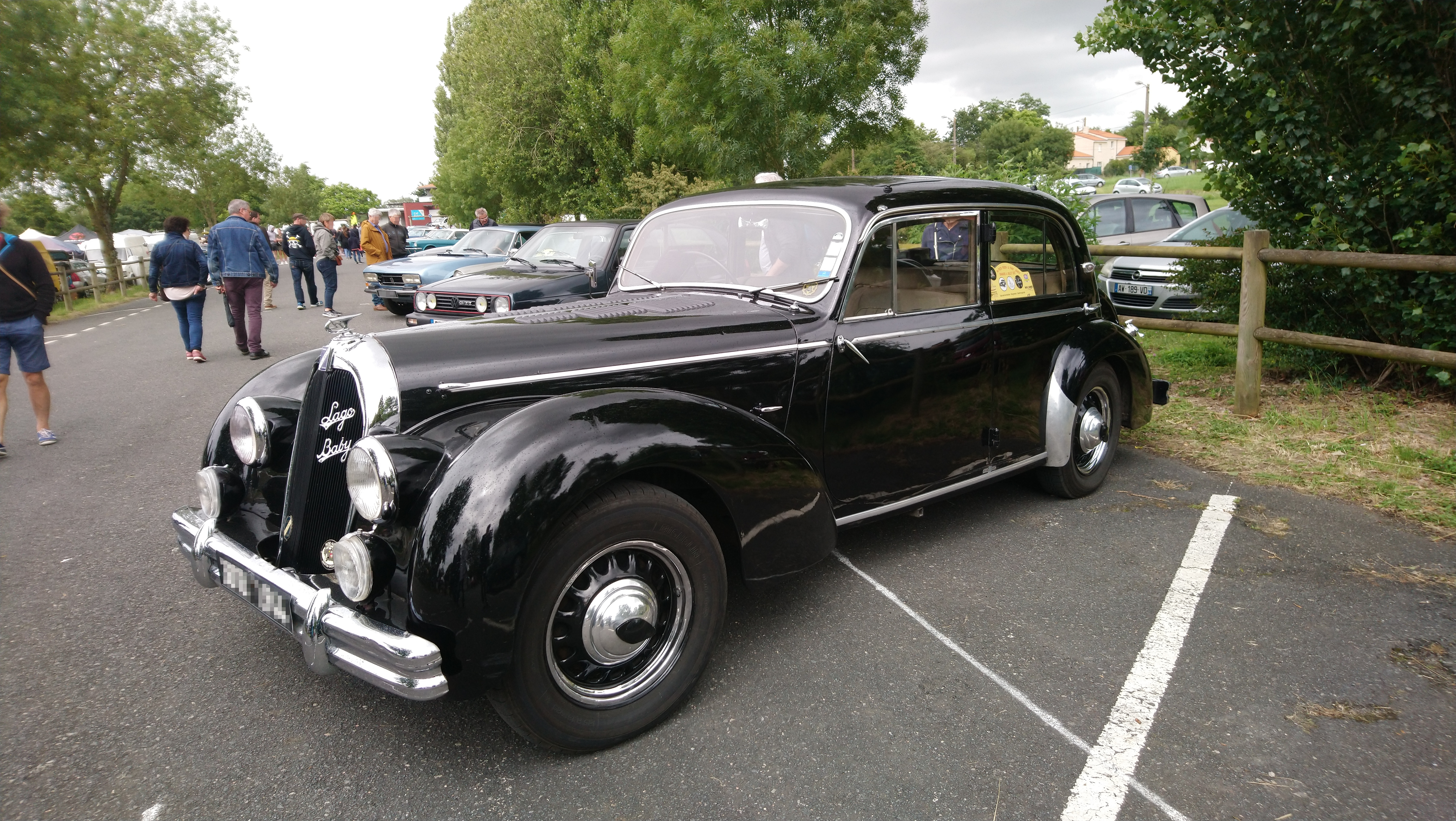
1950 Talbot-Lago T15 LB with the standard, steel four-door saloon body

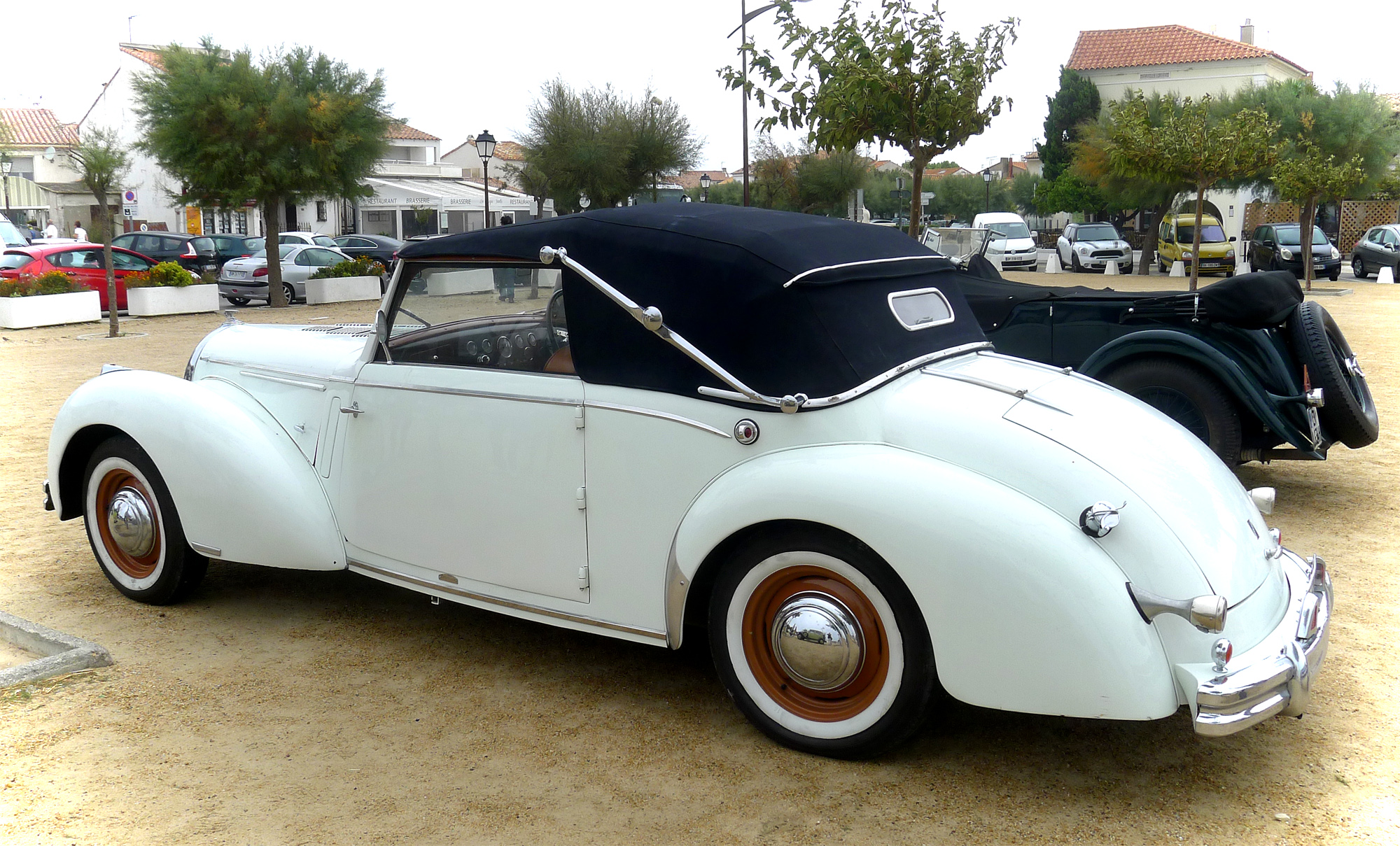
Talbot-Lago Baby T15 Cabriolet; rear view

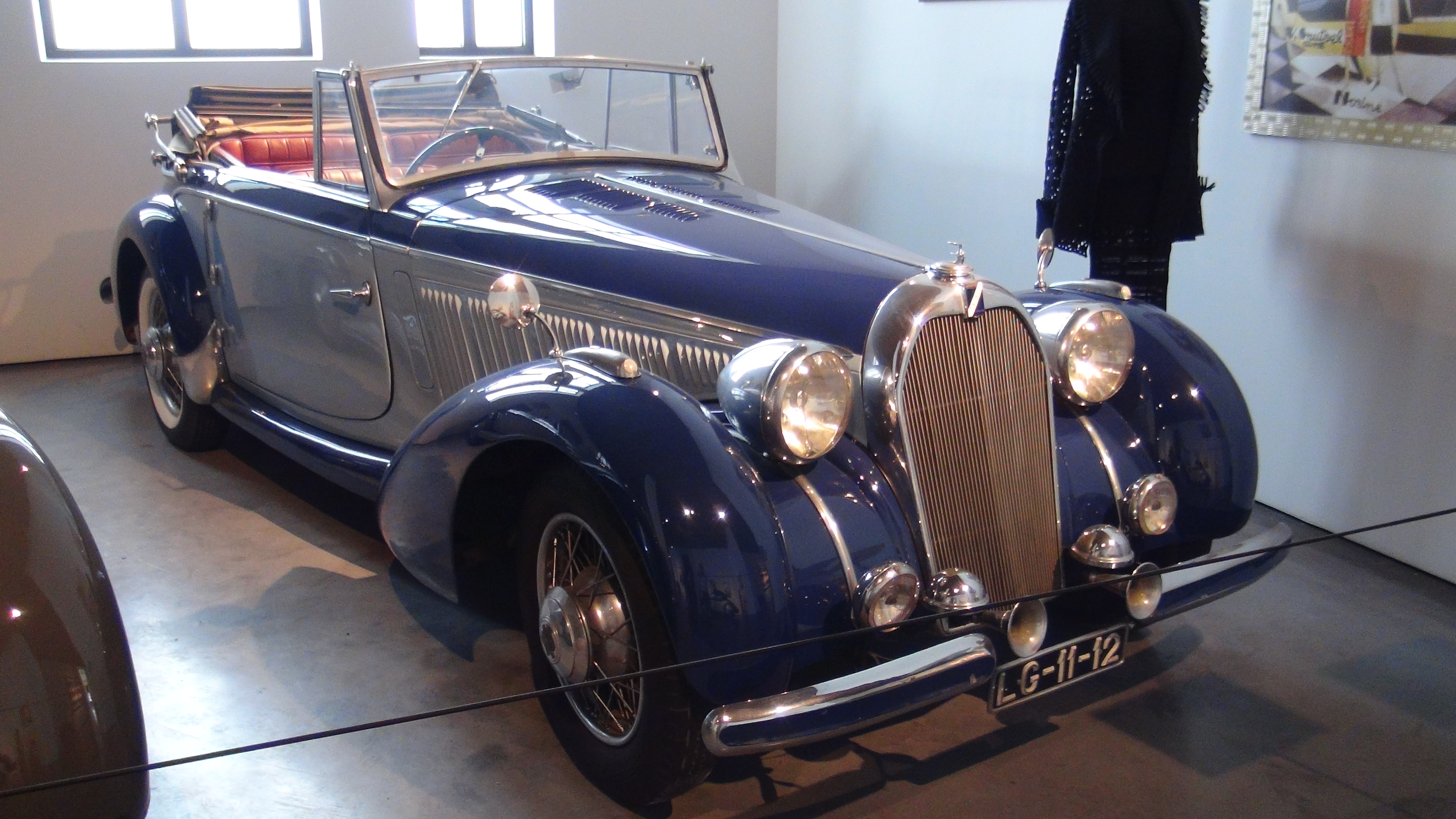
Talbot-Lago Baby T23 Cabriolet (1937)

== Sporting derivatives ==
=== Talbot Lago-Spécial ===
The Talbot Lago-Spécial was in effect a Talbot Baby 23CV, but with a high-tech cylinder head. The choice of bodies was the same, except that the two-door four-seater "coach" standard steel-bodied car was designated "Coach Grand Luxe" and came with an advertised price, at the 1937 motor show, of 103,480 francs which was nearly twice the advertised price for the same body/chassis combination in the Talbot Baby 15CV. The "Grand luxe" designation no doubt highlighted a superior level of fittings in the car. Wilson "pre-selector" transmission was included as a standard feature. Most of the publicity and attention focused on the engine, however.

The Spécial shared the 3996 cc (23CV) cylinder block of the Baby 23CV, but in this application the cylinder head was formed from light metal alloy and incorporated hemispherical combustion chambers above the cylinders. This made it possible for the cylinder valves, while still at this stage driven by a single camshaft, to be mounted in a narrow V formation, while a sparking plug was positioned centrally above each cylinder. Power was further enhanced by the fitting of twin Zénith-Stromberg 42 carburetters, providing 140 bhp (100 kW) and a listed top speed of 160 km/h (101 mph). During 1938 the twin carburetter arrangements was replaced by triple Zénith 32 carburetters in pursuit of further power enhancement. In addition to providing a formidable level of power, the sophisticated cylinder head pointed the way to future developments which would culminate with the 1946 launch of the Talbot Lago Record, which would feature a twin camshaft arrangement cylinder head.

=== Talbot Lago-SS ===
The Lago-SS shared the advanced cylinder-head technology of the Lago-Spécial, but it used a shortened 2,650 mm (104.3 in) wheel-base chassis. There was no "standard body" offered with this car which was produced by Talbot only in bare chassis form. Exotic coach-built bodies were provided by coach builders, most notably Figoni & Falaschi. Although fuel feed was "normally" provided using triple Zénith 32 carburetters, cars were also produced featuring larger diameter Zénith 35 carburetters, and thus equipped the car came with listed maximum power of 200 hp (147 kW).

== A new Baby for 1952 ==
Although its Talbot heritage were unmistakable, the Talbot-Lago Baby that appeared in June 1951 ready for the 1952 model year was quite different in purpose and approach from the Talbot Babys of the 1930s. Very few of the Babys for the 1950s were ever actually produced, but the cars that were presented at the Paris Motor Shows in 1951, 1952 and 1953 combined a 3,125 mm (123.0 in) wheelbase with a new Ponton-format body. The body was shared with the rebodied, 4,482 cc (26CV) Talbot Lago Record introduced at the same time, but in place of the six-cylinder engine of the Record, the new Baby made do with a four-cylinder 2690 cc engine producing 110 hp (81 kW) of power. While the manufacturer struggled financially, the 1950s Baby was also offered with a six-cylinder unit of 2693 cc. This overhead valve, oversquare design had hemispherical combustion chambers and developed 120 hp (88 kW); it appears to have been designed for a projected competition car.

By the time of the Motor Show in October 1953 the Talbot Baby had disappeared from the manufacturer's price lists, and following that date just a single 15CV car remained in stock, to be sold soon afterwards.

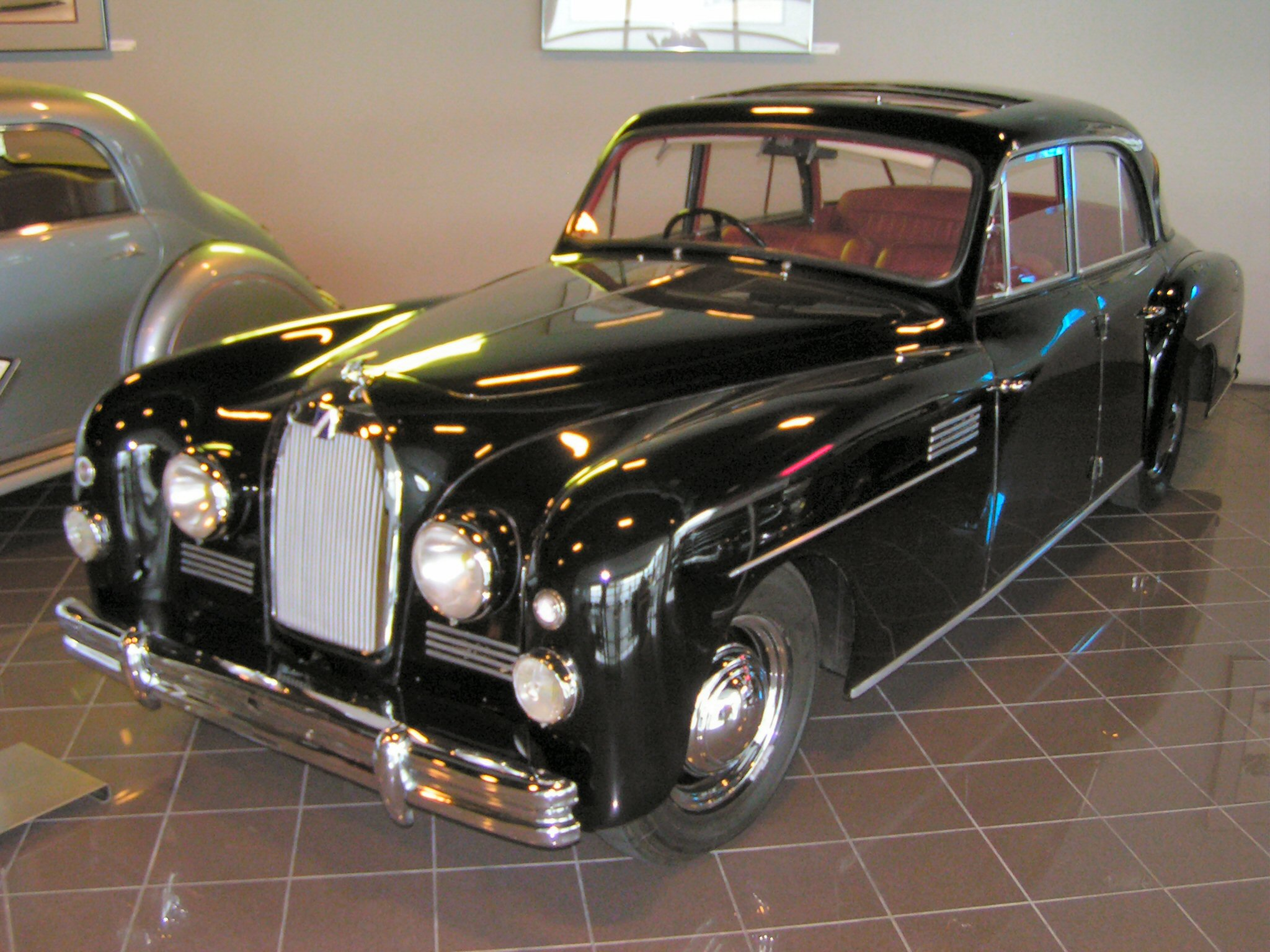
The ponton-bodied Talbot-Lago T15 QL6 (1953)

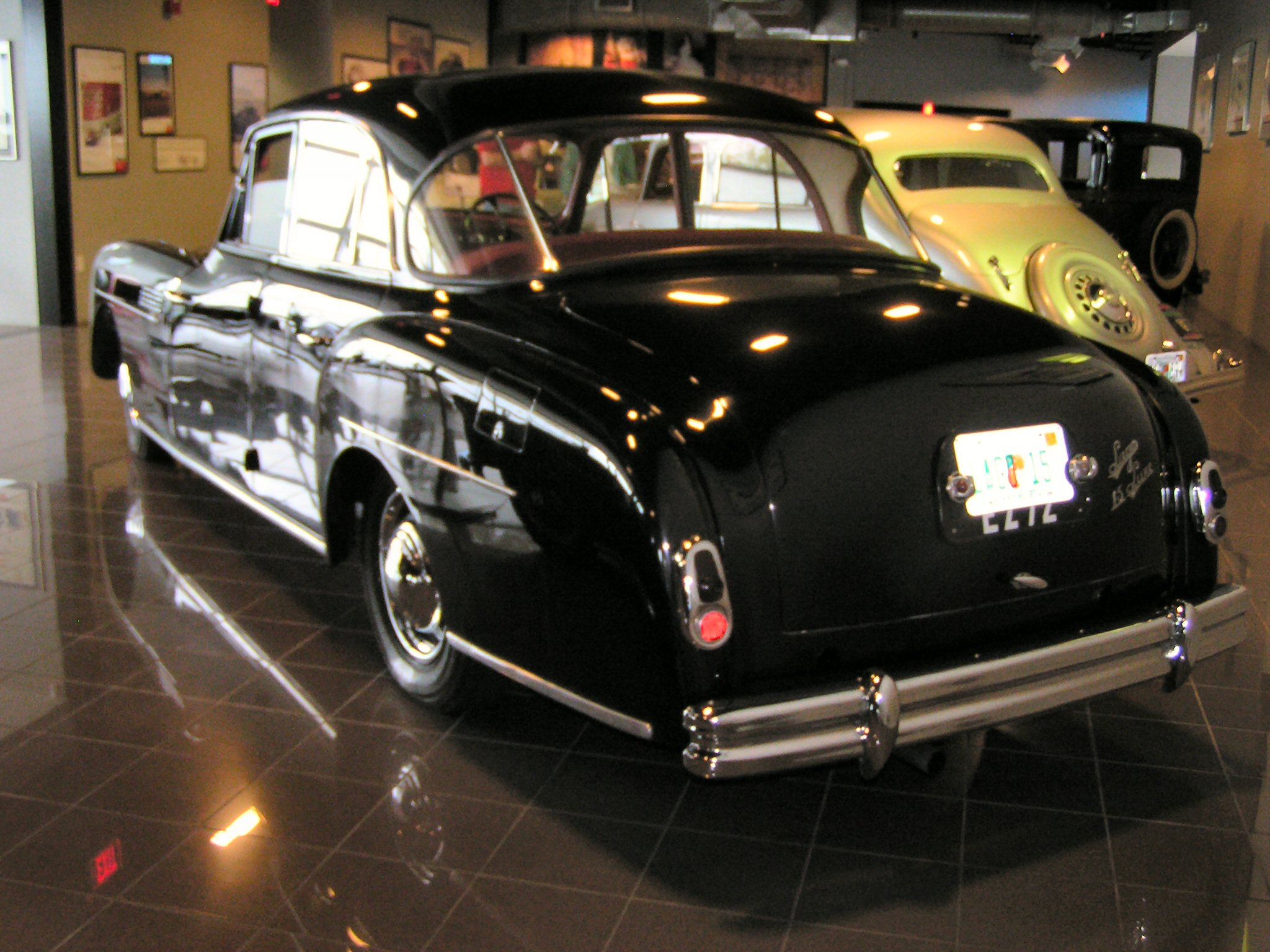
Rear view
