= Talbot-Lago =

Automobile manufacturer (1920–1959)

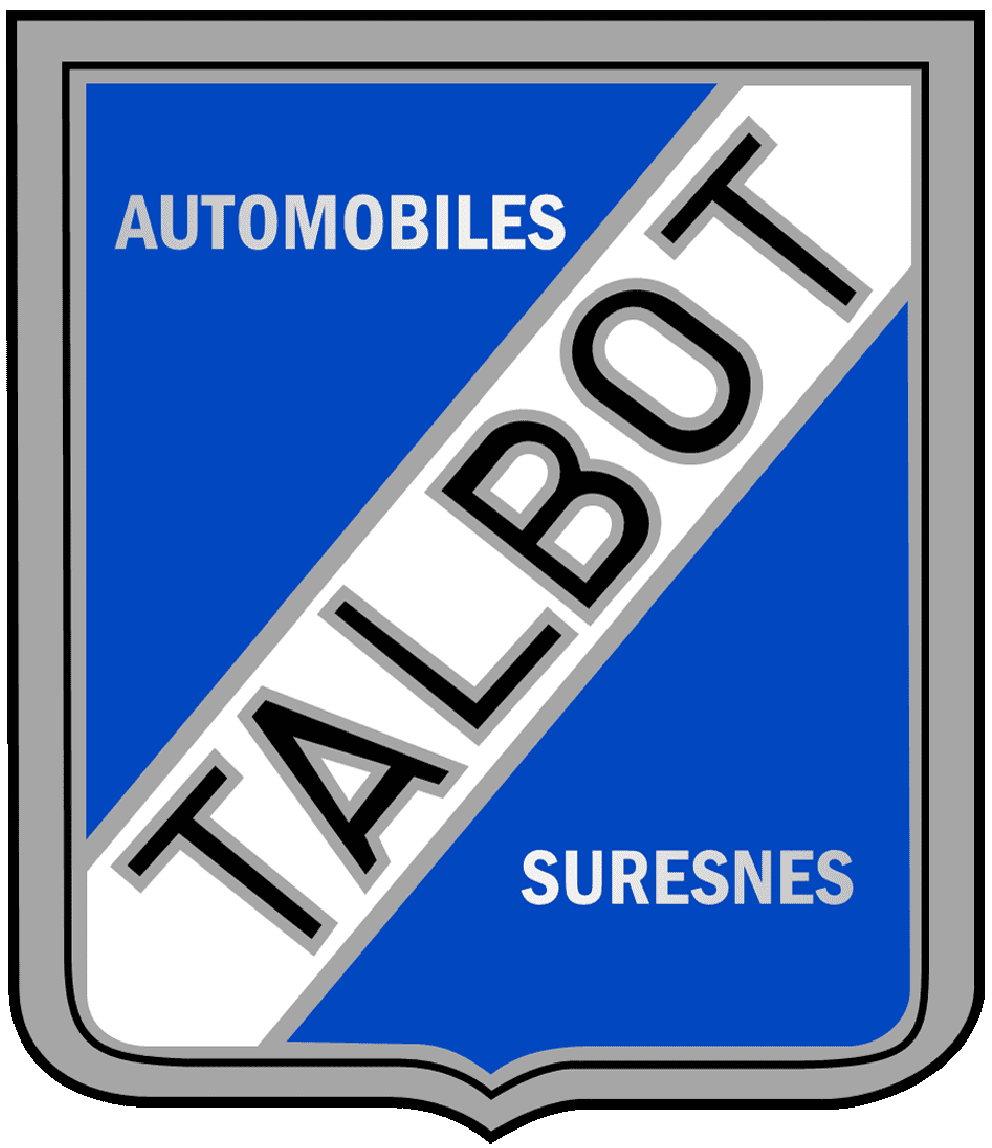
- Type: S.A.
- Industry: Automotive
- Predecessor: Automobiles Talbot
- Founded: 1936
- Founder: Antonio Lago
- Defunct: 1959; 67 years ago
- Fate: Acquired by Simca in 1959
- Headquarters: Suresnes, France
- Products: Automobiles, racing cars
- Brands: Talbot

Talbot-Lago was a French automobile manufacturer based in Suresnes, Hauts de Seine, outside Paris. The company was owned and managed by Antonio Lago, an Italian engineer that acquired rights to the Talbot brand name after the demise of Darracq London's subsidiary Automobiles Talbot France in 1936.

Under Lago's managing, the company produced a range of automobiles that included sport and racing cars; in some cases, the bodies of the vehicles were designed by coachbuilding companies such as Figoni et Falaschi. Talbot-Lago faced financial problems; as a result, Lago sold the company to Simca in 1959.

== Predecessors ==
=== Alexandre Darracq ===
The Suresnes factory had been built by Alexandre Darracq for his pioneering car manufacturing business begun in 1896, which he named A. Darracq & Cie. It was very profitable. Alexandre Darracq built racing as well as "pleasure" cars and Darracq rapidly became famous for its motor racing successes. Darracq sold his remaining portion of his business in 1912.

=== Talbot France ===
New owners renamed the Darracq business Automobiles Talbot in 1922. However, though its ordinary production cars were badged as Talbots, the new owners continued incorporating the Darracq name in Talbot-Darracq for their competition cars.

Owing to the simultaneous existence of British Talbot cars, French products when sold in Britain were badged Darracq-Talbot or Talbot-Darracq, or even simply Darracq.

=== Antonio Lago ===
In 1932, after the onset of the Great Depression, Italo-British businessman Antonio Lago was appointed managing director in the hope that he might revive Automobiles Talbot's business. Lago began this process, but the owners were unable to stave off receivership beyond the end of 1934. The receiver did not immediately close Automobiles Talbot, and in 1936 Antonio Lago managed to complete a management buy-out from the receiver.

== Reorganisation under Tony Lago ==
For 1935, the existing range continued in production but from 1936 these were steadily replaced with cars designed by Walter Becchia, featuring transverse leaf-sprung independent suspension. These included the 4-cylinder 2323 cc (13CV) Talbot Type T4 "Minor", a surprise introduction at the 1937 Paris Motor Show, and the 6-cylinder 2,696 cc (15CV) Talbot "Cadette-15", along with and the 6-cylinder 2,996 cc or 3,996 cc (17 or 23CV) Talbot "Major" and its long-wheelbase version, the Talbot "Master": these were classified as Touring cars (voitures de tourisme).

There was also in the second half of the 1930s a range of Sporting cars (voitures de sport) which started with the Talbot "Baby-15", mechanically the same as the "Cadette-15" but using a shorter slightly lighter chassis. The Sporting Cars range centred on the 6-cylinder 2,996 cc or 3,996 cc (17 or 23CV) Talbot "Baby" and also included the 3,996 cc (23CV) 23 and sporting Lago-Spéciale and Lago-SS models, respectively with two and three carburettors, and corresponding increases in power and performance. The most frequently specified body for the Lago-SS was built by Figoni et Falaschi, and featured a particularly aerodynamic form.

Lago developed the existing six-cylinder engine into a 4-litre engine. The sporting six-cylinder models had a successful racing history. The bodies—such as those of the T150 coupé—were made by coachbuilders such as Figoni et Falaschi or Saoutchik.

=== Talbot-Lago models 1935–1940 ===
Although the proliferation of cars types and model names that followed Lago's acquisition of the business is at first glance bewildering, it actually involved only four standard chassis lengths as follows:

Pre-War Talbot-Lago models

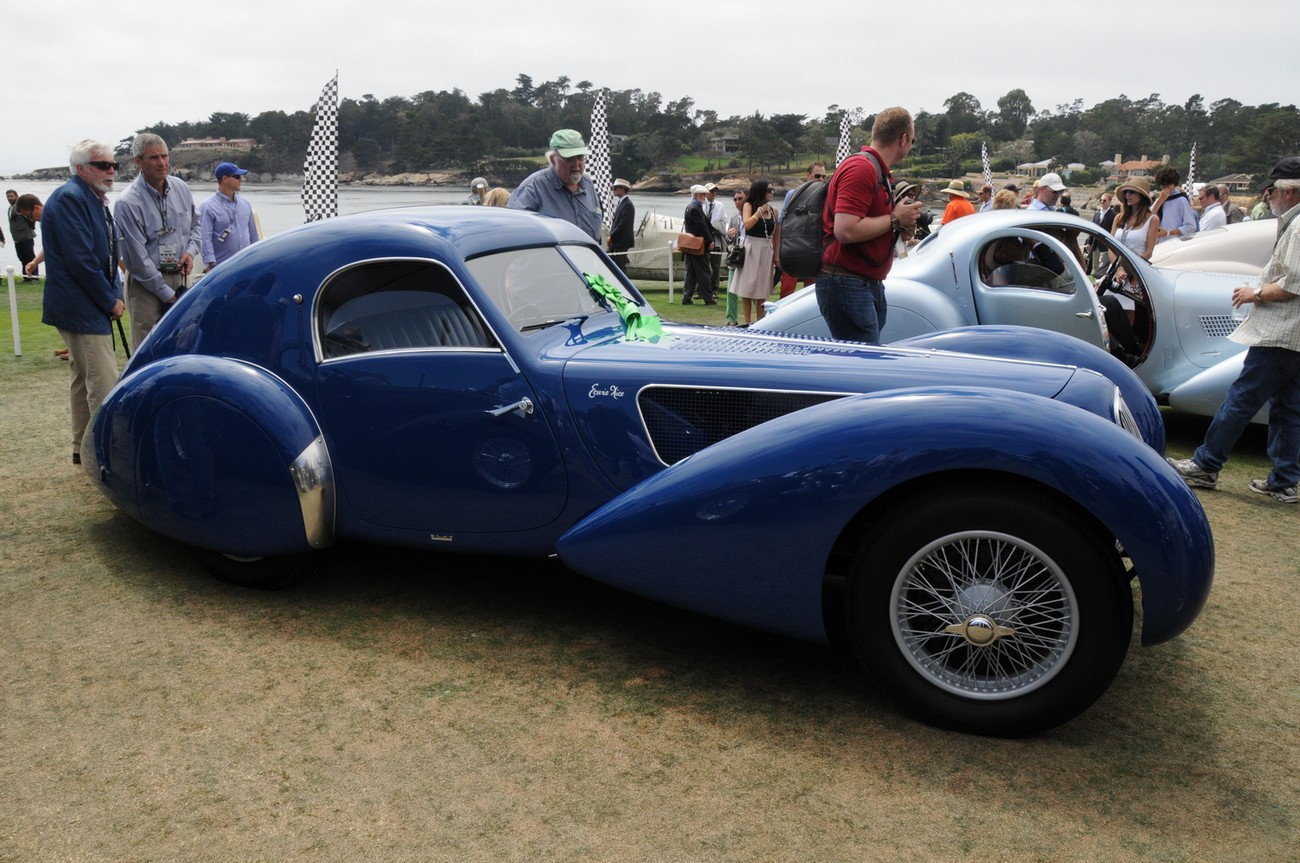
1939 Talbot-Lago T-150 CSS. Body by Carrosserie Marcel Pourtout, designer Georges Paulin

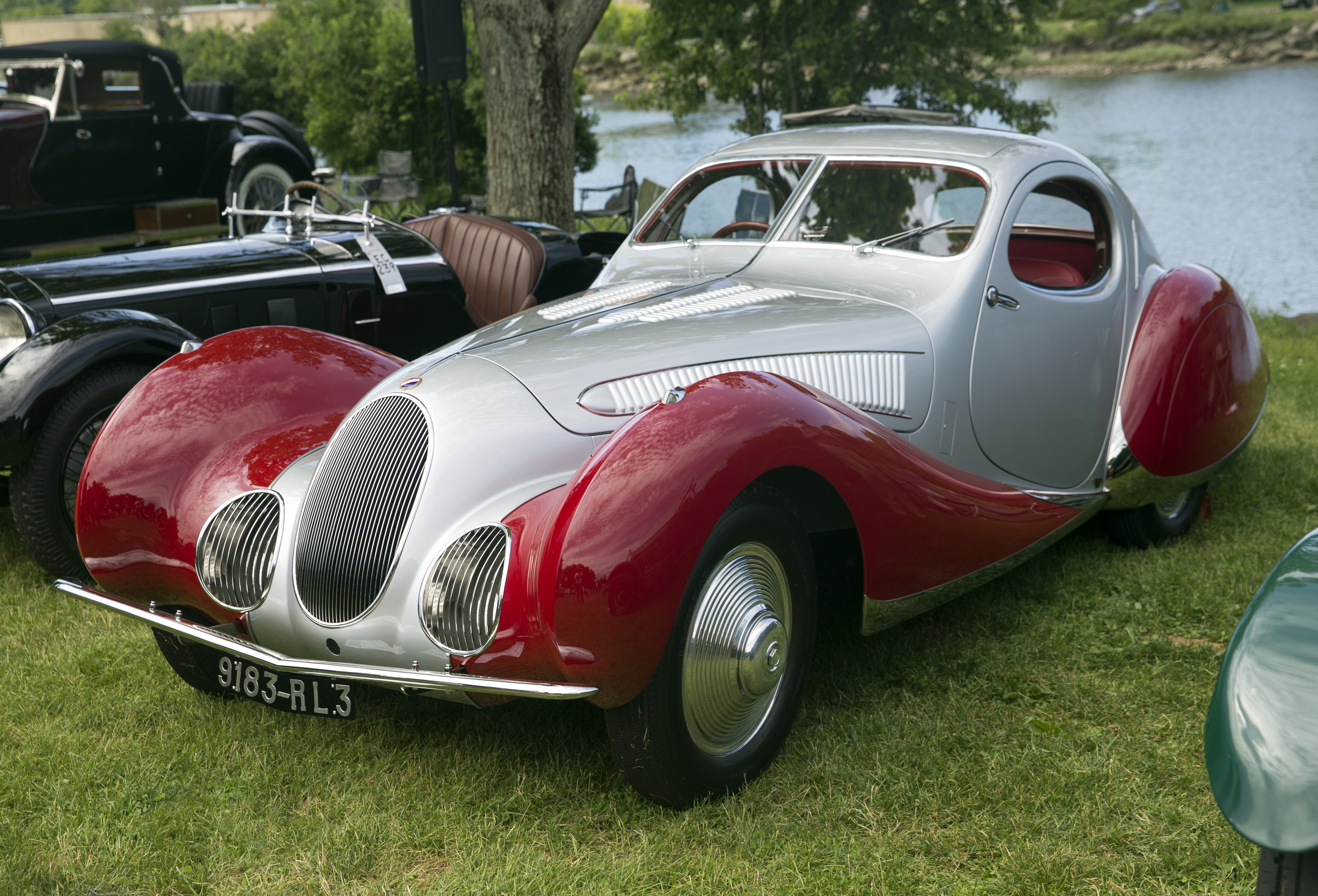
1937 Talbot-Lago T150 SS. Teardrop Coupe bodywork by Figoni & Falaschi

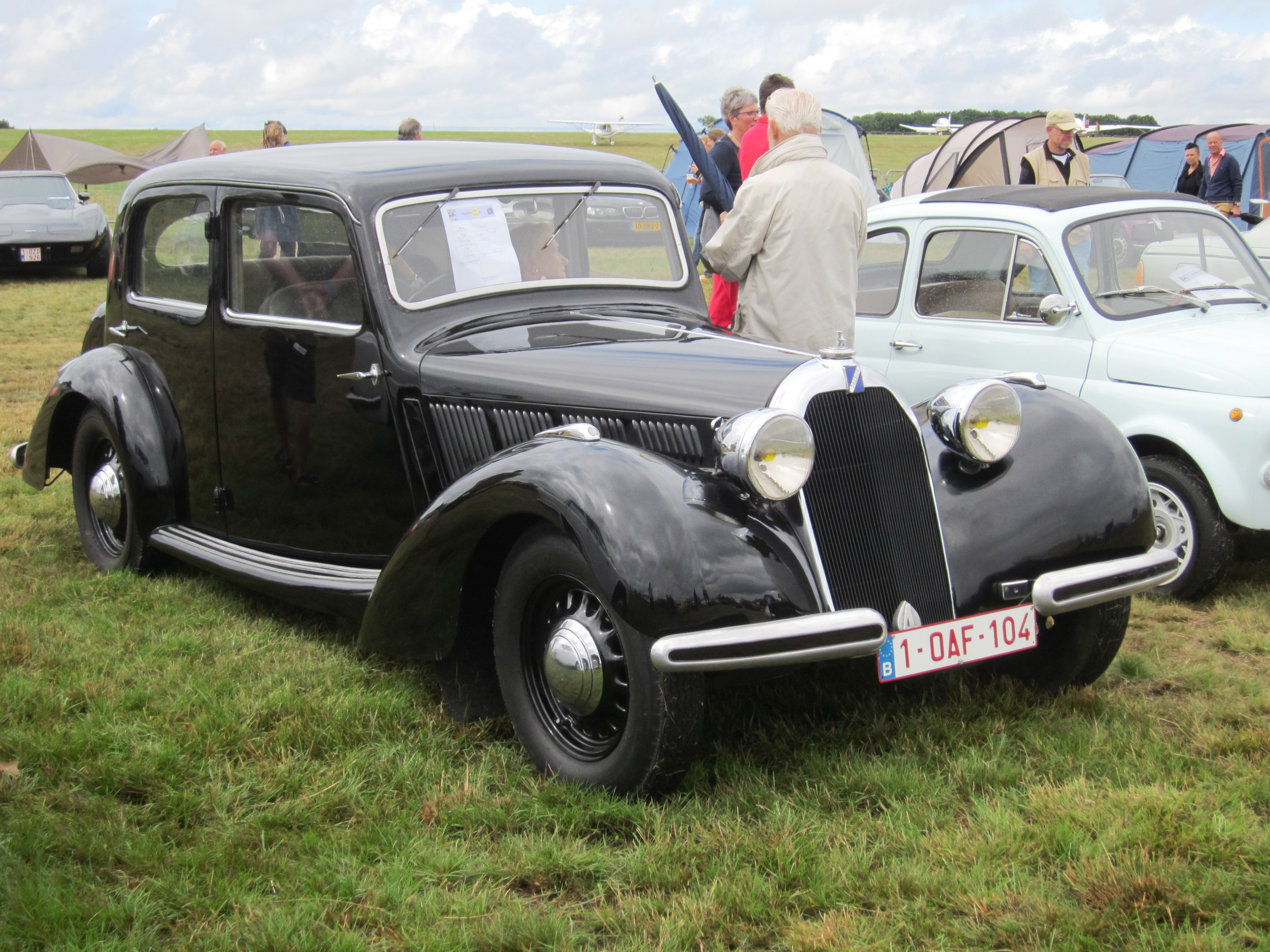
Talbot Lago Minor T4 1937, a 2,323 cc (141.8 cu in) which competed with equivalent models from Hotchkiss and Salmson

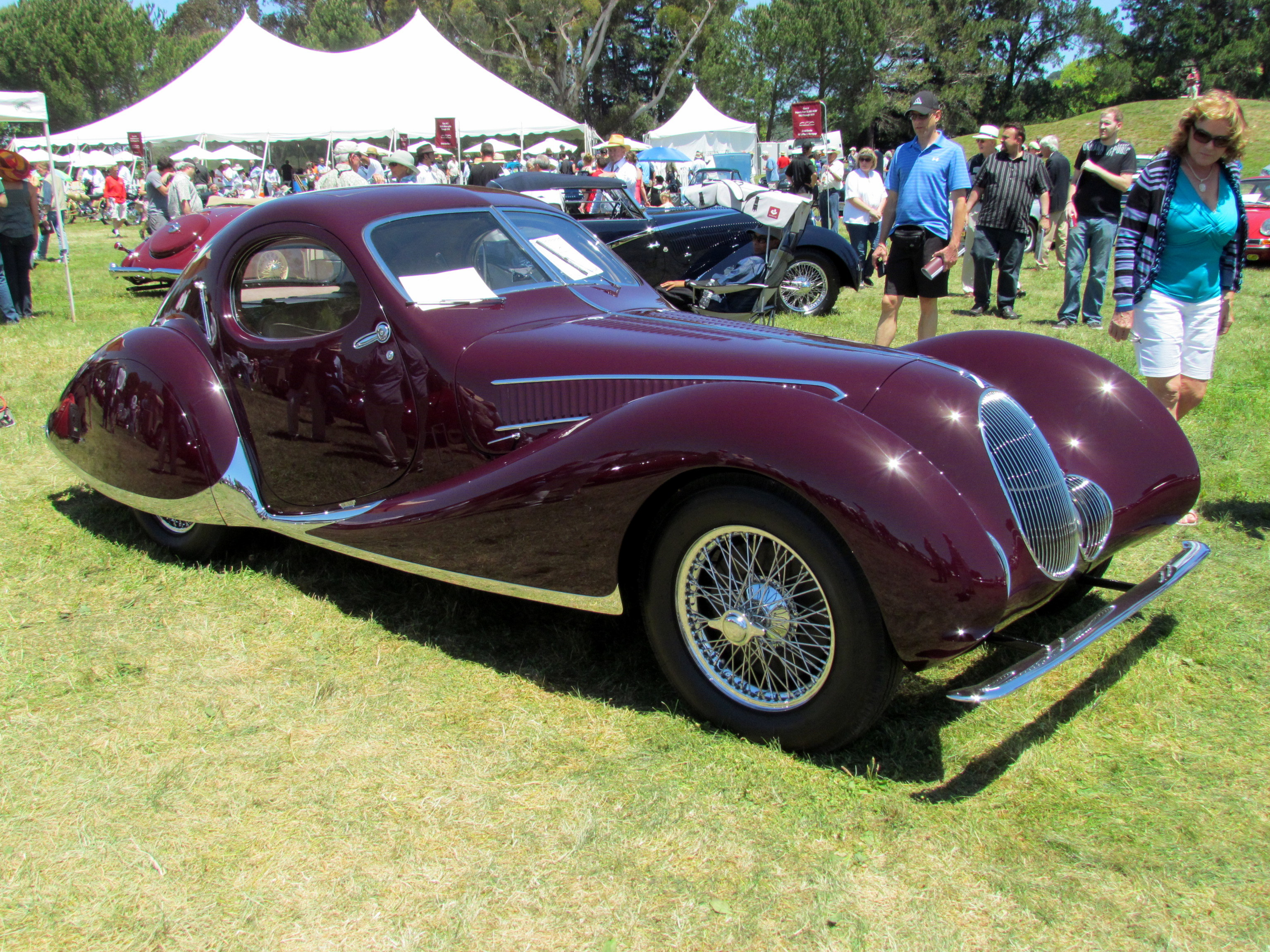
Figoni & Falaschi teardrop coupé on a 1938 SS 150 chassis

Short chassis (2,950 mm (116.1 in) wheelbase):

Minor T4 (4 cylinders, 2323 cc)
Junior 11
Baby-15 (6 cylinders, 2696 cc)
Baby 3 litres (6 cylinders, 2996 cc)
T150 3 litres (6 cylinders, 2996 cc)
Baby 4 litres (6 cylinders, 3996 cc)
Lago Spécial (6 cylinders, 3996 cc with twin or triple carbs)

Extra short chassis (2,650 mm (104.3 in) wheelbase):

Lago SS (6 cylinders, 3996 cc with triple carbs)

Normal chassis (3,200 mm (126.0 in) wheelbase):

Cadette-15 (6 cylinders, 2696 cc)
Major 3 litres (6 cylinders, 2996 cc)
Major 4 litres (6 cylinders, 3996 cc)

Long (7-seater) chassis (3,450 mm (135.8 in) wheelbase):

Master 3 litres (6 cylinders, 2996 cc)
Master 4 litres (6 cylinders, 3996 cc)

During the early years of the war, Walter Becchia left Talbot to work for Citroën. In 1942 Lago was joined by another engineer, Carlo Machetti, and from then the two of them were working on the twin camshaft 4483 cc six-cylinder unit that would lie at the heart of the 1946 Talbot T26.

== After World War II ==
After the war, the company continued to be known both for successful high-performance racing cars and for large luxurious passenger cars, with extensive sharing of chassis and engine components between the two. Nevertheless, the period was one of economic stagnation and financial stringency. The company had difficulty finding customers, and its finances were stretched.

In 1946, the company began production of a new engine design, based on earlier units but with a new cylinder head featuring twin in-block camshafts. This engine, designed under the leadership of Carlo Marchetti, was in many respects a new engine. A 4483 cc six-cylinder in-line engine was developed for the Talbot Lago Record (1946–1952) and for the Talbot Grand Sport 26CV (1947–1954). These cars were priced against large luxurious cars from the likes of Delahaye, Delage, Hotchkiss and Salmson. Talbot would remain in the auto-making business for longer than any of these others, and the Talbot name was resurrected in the early 1980s.

=== Talbot Lago Record T26 ===
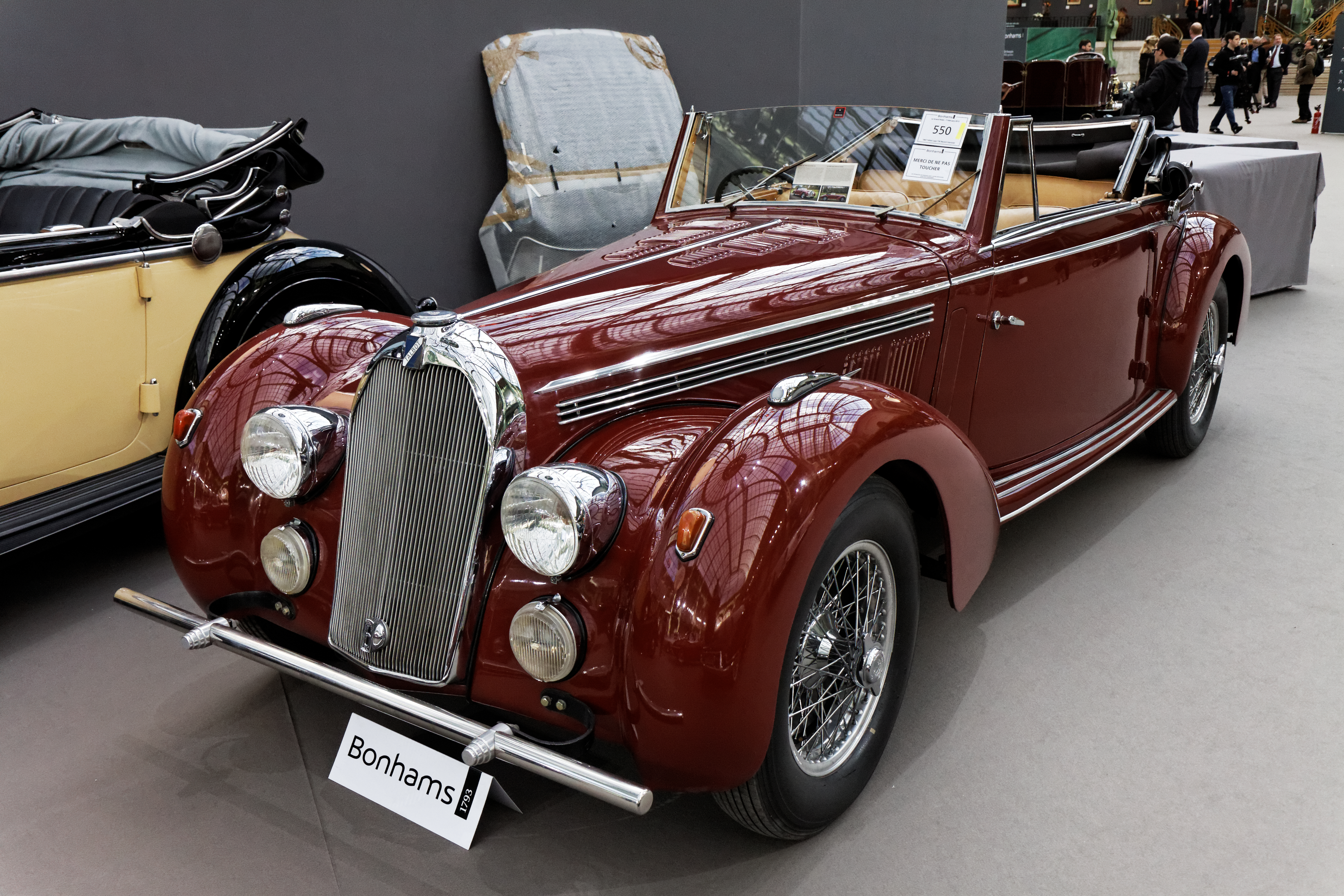
Talbot Lago Record T26 cabriolet

The "Talbot Lago Record T26" was a large car with a fiscal horsepower of 26 CV and a claimed actual power output of 170 hp, delivered to the rear wheels via a four-speed manual gear box, with the option at extra cost of a Wilson pre-selector gear box, and supporting a claimed top speed of 170 km/h (105 mph). The car was commonly sold as a four-door sedan, but a two-door cabriolet was also offered. There were also coachbuilt specials with bodywork by traditionalist firms such as Graber.

=== Talbot Lago Grand Sport T26 ===
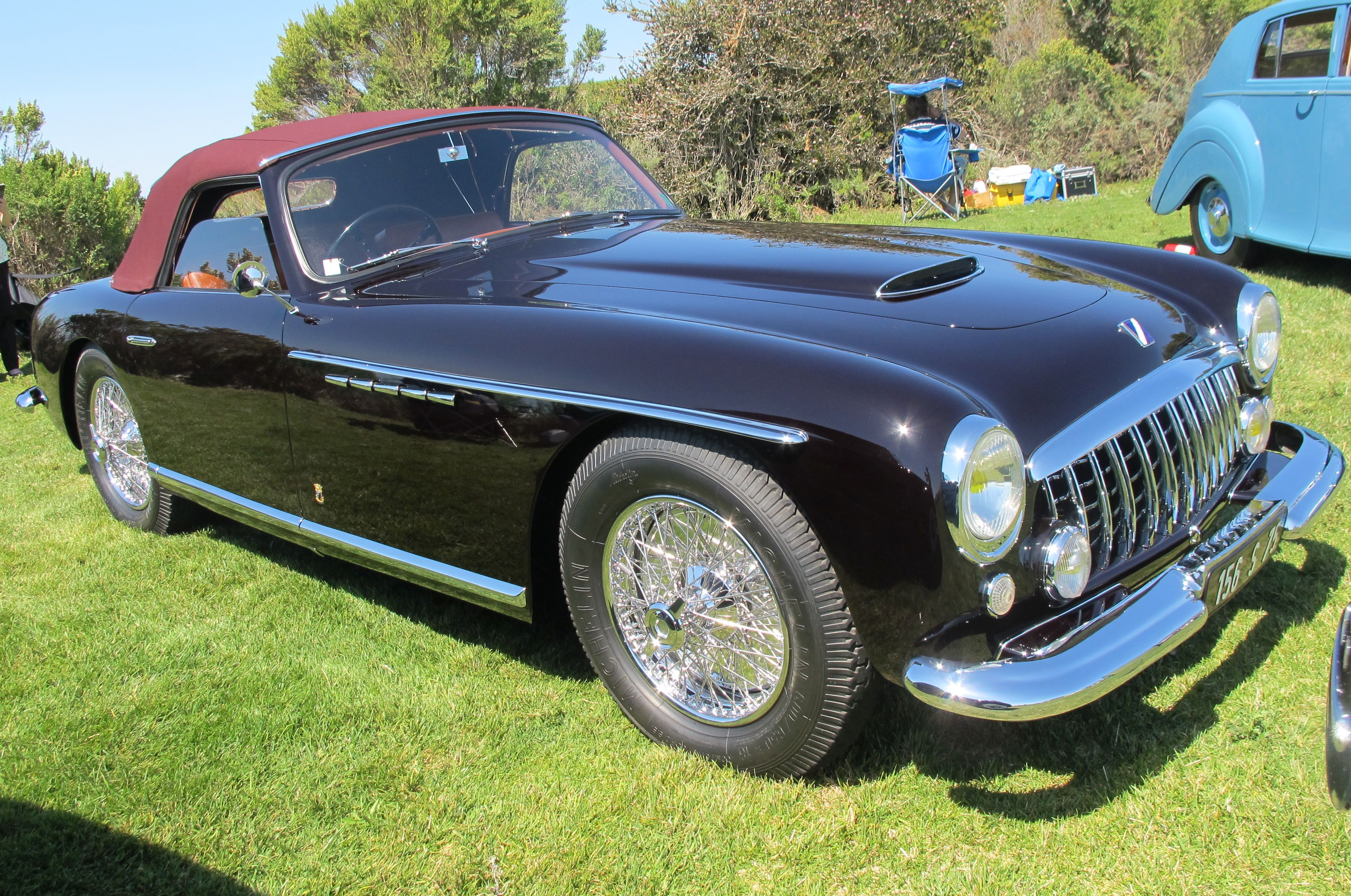
1951 Talbot-Lago T26 Grand Sport Cabriolet by Stabilimenti Farina

The "T26 Grand Sport (GS)" was first displayed in public in October 1947 as a shortened chassis, and only 12 were made during 1948 which was the model's first full year of production. The car was noted for its speed. The engine which produced 170 hp in the Lago Record was adapted to provide 190 bhp (140 kW) or, later, 195 bhp (145 kW) in the GS, and a top speed of around 200 km/h (124 mph) was claimed, depending on the body that was fitted. The car was built for either racing or luxury and benefited directly from Talbot's successful T26C Grand Prix car. As such it was expensive, rare and helped Louis Rosier with his son to win the LeMans 24 Hour race in 1950. The GS replaced the Lago-Record chassis which was named for its remarkable top speed. The GS was one of the world's most powerful production cars at the time. It had several special features from the T26 Grand Prix cars, such as a 4.5-litre inline-6 aluminum cylinder head, a hollowed camshaft, multiport exhaust system and triple carburetors. Chassis details were similar to the Grand Prix cars, but it was longer and wider. It came it two wheelbase lengths -104 and 110 inches (2,800 mm).

Almost all the Talbots sold during the late 1940s came with Talbot bodies, constructed in the manufacturer's extensive workshops. The T26 Grand Sport (GS) was the exception, however, and cars were delivered only as bare chassis, requiring customers to choose bespoke bodywork from a specialist coachbuilder.

=== Talbot Lago Baby ===
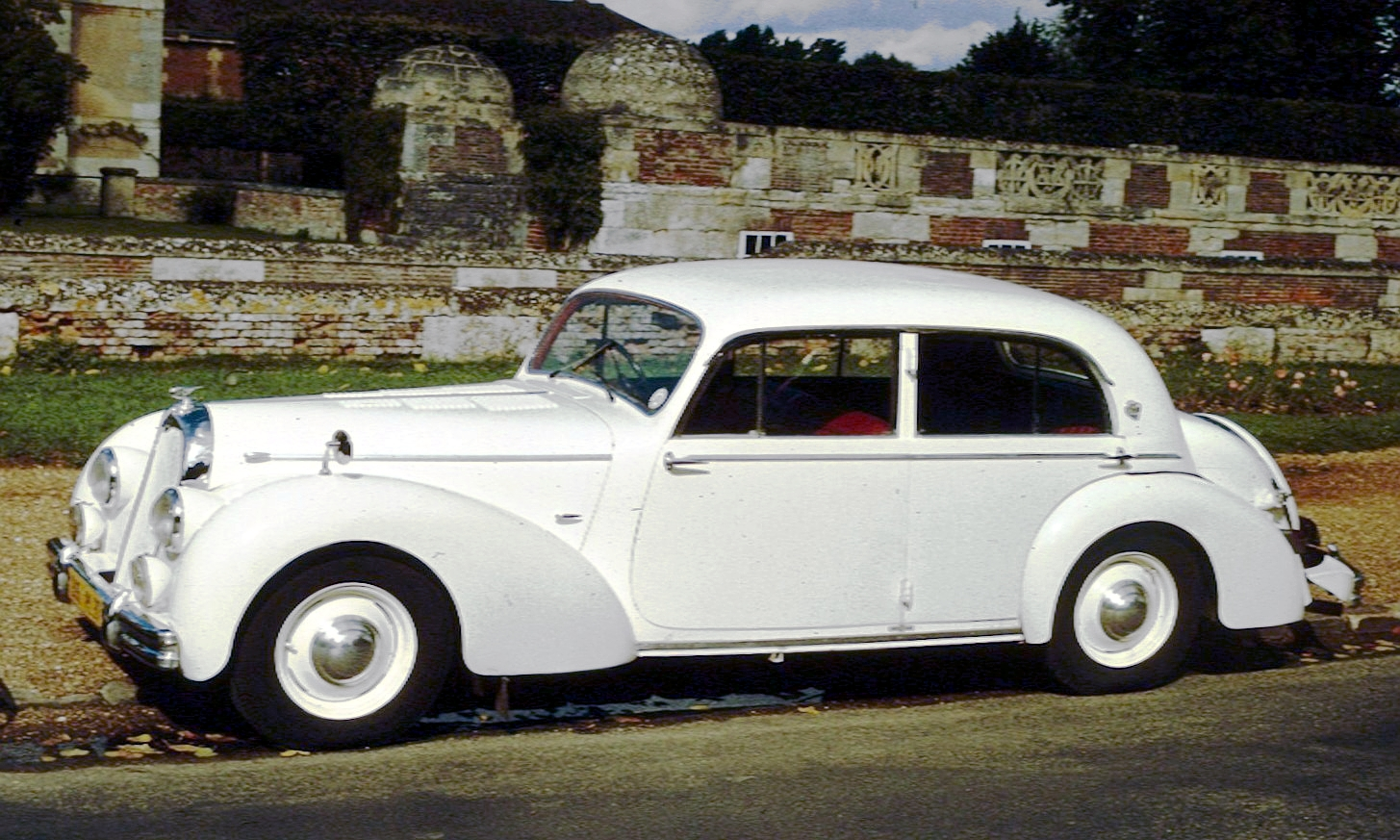
Talbot-Lago T15 Baby Berline d'Usine ca. 1950

The Talbot Lago Baby (1948–1951) marked the return of a pre-war Talbot model name and was the third model presented by the company during the 1940s. The car was commonly sold as a four-door sedan, but a two-door cabriolet was also offered. Its engine comprised only four cylinders, but the twin overhead camshaft with cylinder valves on both sides of the engine block was again featured: at 2690 cc the engine capacity equated to a fiscal horsepower of 15 CV, which was enough to attract the punitive levels of car tax applied by the French government to large cars. The power output was initially 110 PS (81 kW), which was increased to 120 PS (88 kW) in 1949. Although the postwar Baby sedan closely resembled the more powerful Record on a brief glance, the Baby's 2,950 mm wheelbase was slightly shorter than the 3130 mm wheelbase of the Record, and the overall length was correspondingly 200 mm shorter, reflecting the shortened four-cylinder engine block. Additionally, the cheaper car sat on a simplified suspension set-up. Baby customers could specify as an option a Wilson pre-selector gear box.

Talbot Lago manufactured three special made seven-seater presidential cars; one for the President of France, one for the President of Tunisia, and one for the royal family in Saudi Arabia.

=== Talbot-Lago T26C ===
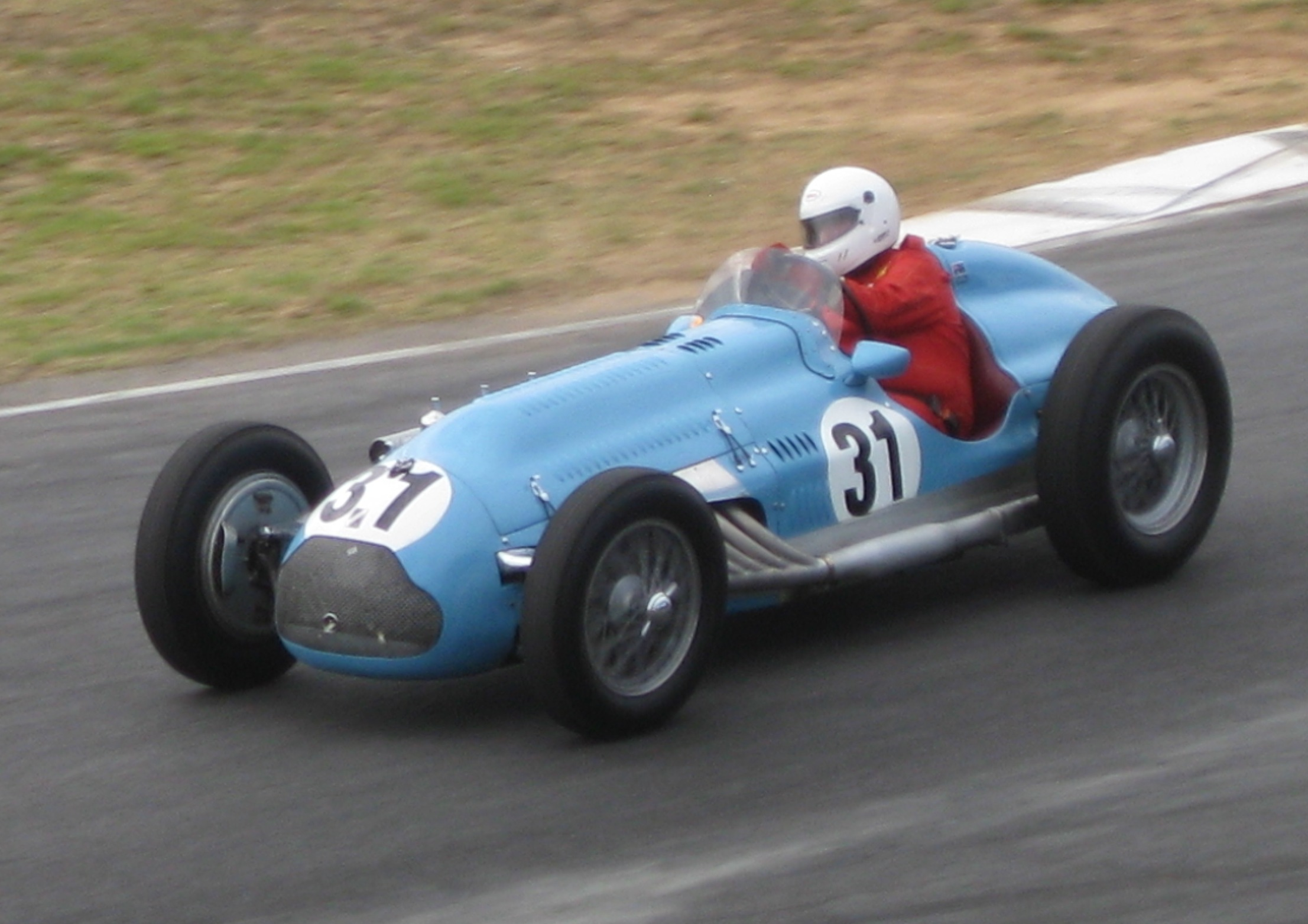
1948 Talbot-Lago T26C

The Talbot-Lago T26C is an open-wheel formula race car, designed and developed by French manufacturer Talbot-Lago, and built to the new Formula One racing rules and regulations, in 1948.

=== New bodies for 1952 ===
In 1951, as rumours of the company's financial difficulties intensified, a new Ponton format body appeared for the Talbot Baby and Record. The wheelbases were carried over from the earlier models. Although in many ways strikingly modern, the new car featured a two-piece front windscreen in place of the single flat screen of its predecessor, presumably reflecting the difficulties at the time of combining the strength of a windscreen with curved glass at an acceptable price and quality. The new car's large rear window was itself replaced by a larger three-piece "panoramic" wrap around back window as part of the car's first face-lift, which took place in time for the 1952 Paris Motor Show. The engine specification of the four-cylinder unit was unchanged as was the claimed performance even though the new body was some 100 kg heavier than the old. A new development with the Ponton-bodied cars body was the availability of the larger six-cylinder unit from the Talbot Record in the top-of-the-line Talbot Baby, which in this form was called the Talbot Baby/6 Luxe, and had the slightly longer wheel-base and overall length enforced by the greater length of the six-cylinder engine.

=== T14 LS engine / Talbot Lago Sport ===
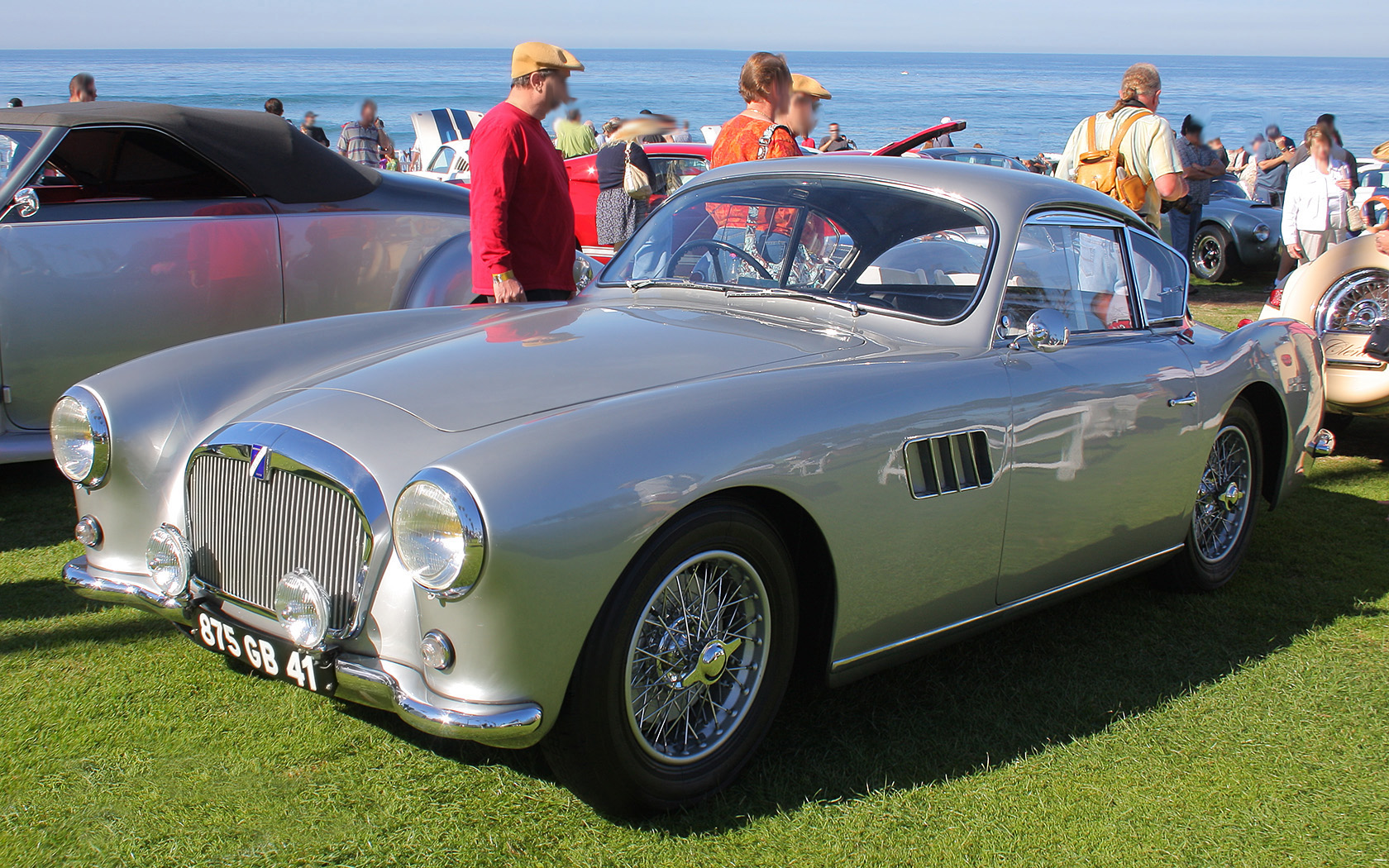
1956 Talbot-Lago T14 LS

At the 1954 Salon de L'Automobile de Paris, Talbot-Lago presented their last new engine: the new four-cylinder still had the typical twin laterally mounted camshafts, although it was upgraded to five main bearings. The new 120 PS (88 kW) 2,491 cc engine was called the T14 LS, but it did not have a car to go in until May 1955 when the Talbot-Lago 2500 Coupé T14 LS was finally presented. The first car had all-aluminium bodywork, but later cars used more steel. Fifty-four of these coupés were built, but they proved hard to sell - the stylish bodywork couldn't quite hide the thirties' underpinnings, and the rough engine offered little elasticity nor longevity.

Lacking the resources to engineer the necessary improvements, for 1957 Talbot-Lago had to resort to buying in an engine. They chose the V8 2580 cc made available by BMW, albeit with the bore diameter slightly reduced, to 72.5 mm, which gave rise to a 2476 cc engine displacement, positioning the car (just) within the 14CV car tax band. Reflecting the company's export plans, Talbot now rebranded the car as the "Talbot Lago America" and (finally) came into line with other French automakers by placing the driver on the left side of the car. However, market response remained lukewarm, and only about a dozen of the BMW powered Talbot Lago Americas were produced. In the early summer of 1958, Tony Lago decided to accept an offer from Simca president, Henri Pigozzi, for the sale of the Talbot brand to Simca. The sale of the business went ahead in 1959.

With the sale of the business to Simca, the new owners found themselves with a handful of the final Talbot Lago Americas which were awaiting engines. There was now no question of Simca being permitted, or wishing, to produce cars with BMW engines, and the only solution available was to fit the last batch of cars with Simca's own 2351 cc V8. This engine had its roots in 1930s Detroit, and was originally provided by Ford to give the (then) Ford Vedette produced by their French subsidiary a flavor of the driving experience offered by an unstressed US style V8 sedan. It was by no stretch of the imagination an engine for a sports car, and even with a second carburetor produced only 95 bhp (71 kW), as against the 138 bhp (103 kW) of the BMW-engined cars from the previous year's production. Claimed top speed was now 165 km/h (103 mph) in place of the 200 km/h (124 mph) listed the previous year. At the 1959 Paris Motor Show a stand had been booked for what was by now the Simca-Talbot brand, but a late decision was taken not to exhibit a Lago America and the stand was instead given up to a hastily constructed "motor show special" prototype of which, after the motor show, nothing more would be heard.

== Commercial and financial ==
Sales data by model were kept confidential, possibly in connection with the company's financial difficulties, but the overall totals for the early 1950s tell a dire story. The Suresnes plant produced 155 cars in 1947, an output which increased by 23 in 1948. 433 cars were produced in 1950, but this then fell to 80 in 1951 and to 34 in 1952. In 1953 it is thought that the company turned out just 13 of the 26CV Record model and 4 of the 15 CV Babys. During the rest of the decade volumes did not recover significantly; no more than 54 of the T14 LS were built in 1955 and 1956.

As the company's commercial trajectory implies, the years following the end of the war were marked by the slow financial collapse of Anthony Lago's Talbot company. Other luxury automakers whose glory years had been the 1930s fared no better in the 1940s and 1950s than Talbot, with Delage, Delahaye, Hotchkiss and Bugatti disappearing from the car business while Panhard, nimbly if slightly improbably, reinvented itself as a manufacturer of small fuel efficient cars. Customers with enough money to spend on a luxury car were hard to find, and even among those with sufficient funds, in a country where well into the 1950s the Communists, buoyed by the heroic role played by some of their leaders during the years of Resistance, regularly polled 25% of the vote in national elections, there was little of the "live for today: pay later" spirit that had supported extravagant spending patterns in the 1930s. Government policy supported the austerity by creating a post-war tax regime that savagely penalised owners of cars with engines above two litres in size, and an Economic Plan, the Pons Plan, which bestowed government favour (and allocations of materials still in short supply such as steel) on just five automakers, these being the businesses that became France's big five automakers in the 1950s and early 60s. For France's other luxury automakers, meanwhile, including Talbot, the tide had simply gone out.

The money ran out, and Tony Lago was obliged to seek court protection from his creditors, under a procedure known at that time as a ”Dépôt de bilan”. On 6 March 1951 the court agreed a debt moratorium which permitted a limited restart to production at the company's Suresnes plant, but the affair provided unwelcome publicity for Talbot's cash flow problems, and the company now experienced increased difficulty in obtaining credit. Production was also limited by the extent to which it had been necessary to cut the workforce, and by the reputational damage caused by reports of the whole process.

The business staggered on till 1959, but never had the financial strength to support the development and production of its last model, the Talbot-Lago 2500 Coupé T14 LS, launched after a lengthy gestation in May 1955. In order to avoid bankruptcy, Lago put the business up for sale in 1958. It was sold on the terms proposed by the Simca president-director Henri Pigozzi, a fellow Italian expatriate, transferring Talbot to Simca in 1959. Despite the sorry state of the Talbot business during the preceding ten years, commentators suggest that Pigozzi got a good bargain, receiving an industrial site and buildings at Suresnes worth many times the amount paid, along with a brand name that still resonated strongly with those old enough to remember the glory days of Talbot.

Anthony Lago died in 1960.

== Today ==
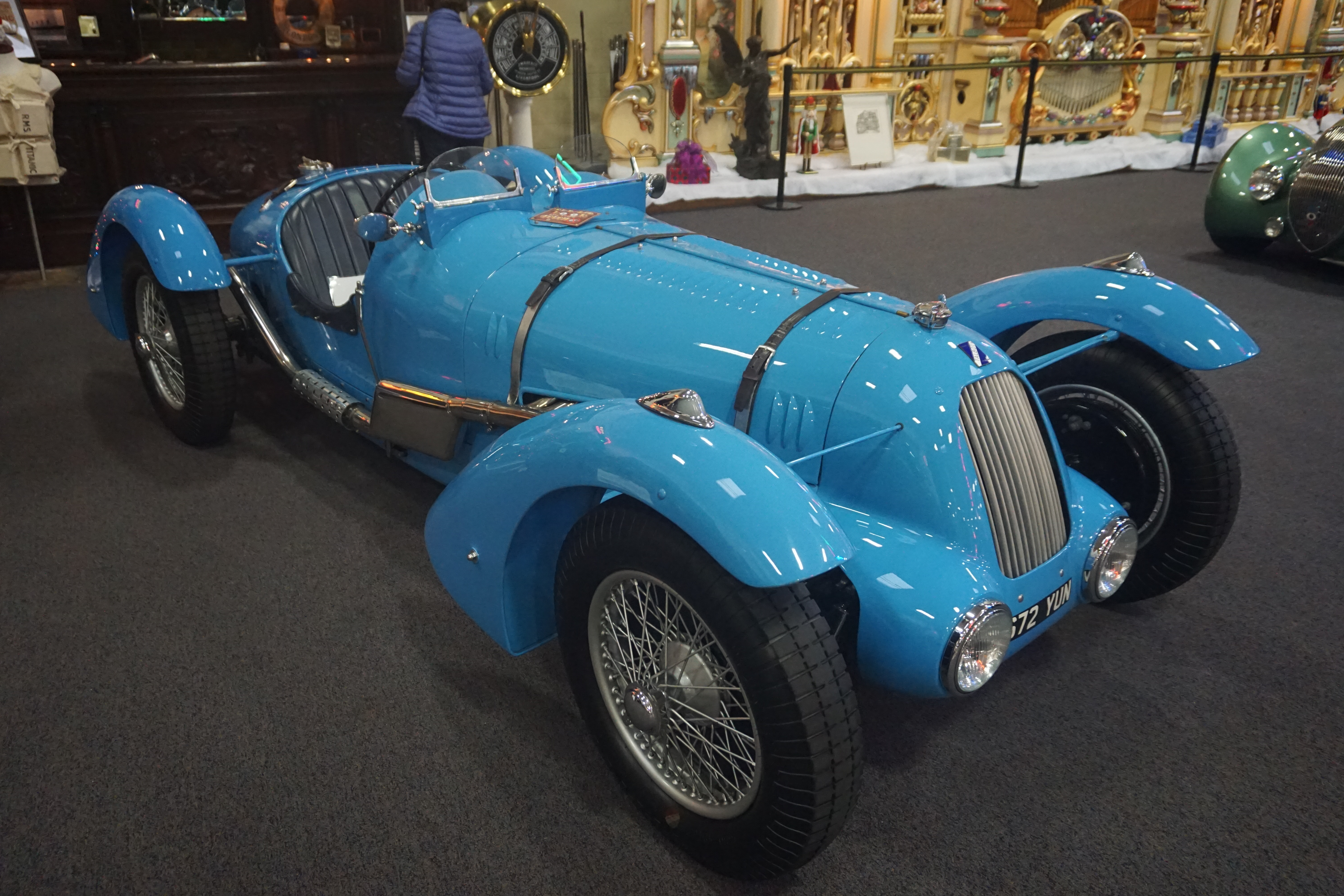
1938 Talbot-Lago T-120 at Stahls Automotive Collection

Talbot-Lagos have become a top-prized car at various auctions. A Figoni et Falaschi-bodied T150C SS Teardrop Coupe, owned by Brooks Stevens, sold for US$3,535,000 at Christie's Pebble Beach Concours d'Elegance auction on 18 August 2005, another for US$3,905,000 at the Palm Beach International Concours d'Elegance Gooding & Company auction on 22 January 2006, where it was unanimously voted "Best in Show", and another for US$4,620,000 at the Pebble Beach Concours d'Elegance RM Auctions Sports & Classics of Monterey auction on 14 August 2010. A T150 C SS with a Pourtout Aerocoupé body, designed by Georges Paulin, sold for US$4,847,000 at the 2008 Bonhams & Butterfields Sale of Exceptional Motorcars and Automobilia at Quail Lodge.

An unrestored 1948 T26 Grand Sport, with coachwork by Oblin and chassis #110106, is a part of the permanent collection of the Simeone Foundation Automotive Museum in Philadelphia, PA, USA.

A 1949 Talbot-Lago T26 Grand Sport Coupé by Saoutchik from the Baillon Collection sold for €1,450,000 at the Artcurial auction in February 2015.

Even Talbot-Lagos with factory bodies, rather than custom coachwork, are highly valued; a factory-bodied 1939 T150 C SS selling in 2013 for US$418,000 at the Gooding & Company Scottsdale auction.
