= Talbot Lago Sport =

Talbot-Lago Sport
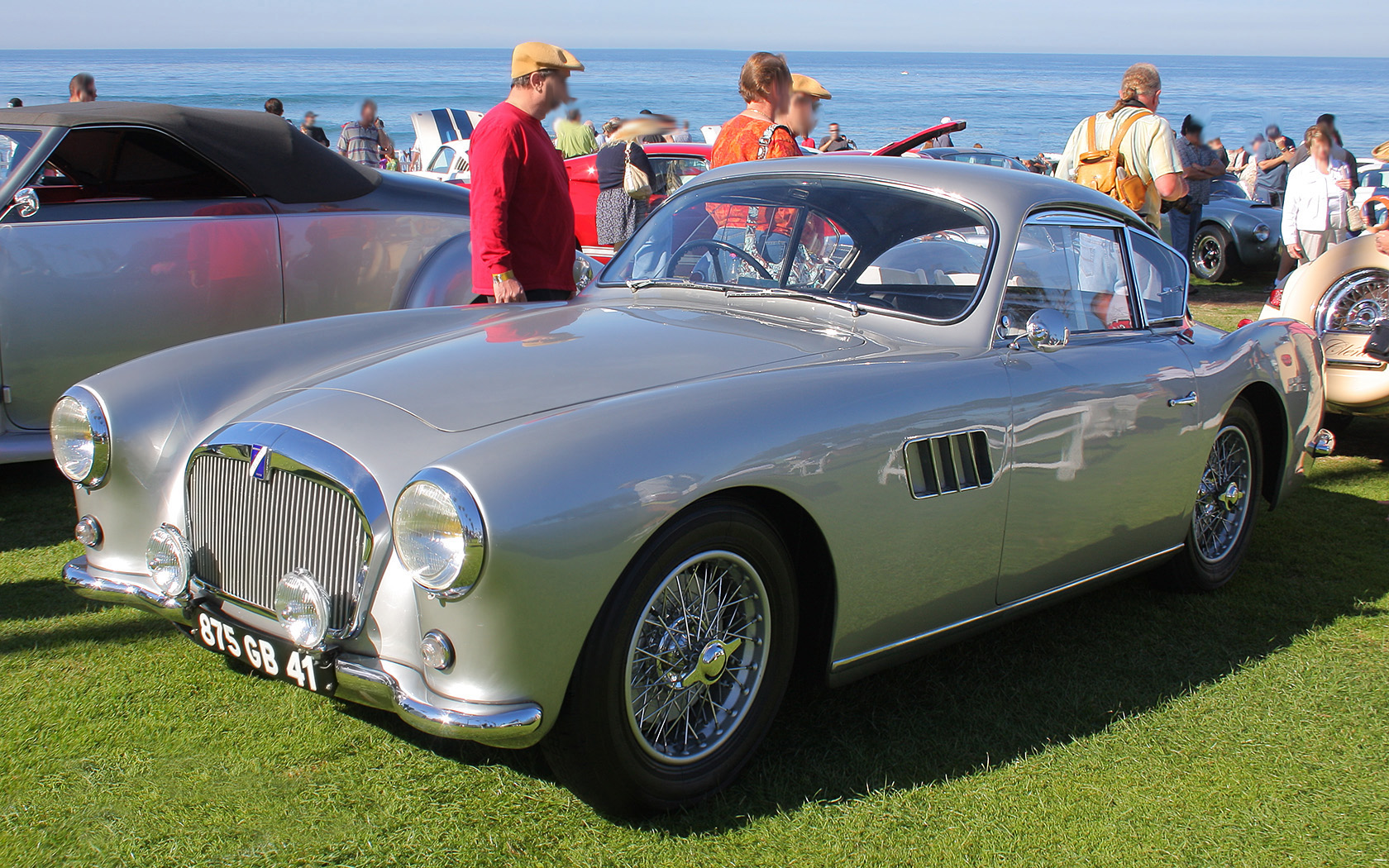

Overview
- Manufacturer: Automobiles Talbot-Darracq S.A.
- Also called: Talbot-Lago T14 LS; Talbot-Lago 2500 Coupé T14 LS; Talbot-Lago America
- Production: 1955–1959
- Assembly: Suresnes

Body and chassis
- Class: sports car
- Body style: 2-seat coupé
- Layout: FR layout

Powertrain
- Engine: 2491 cc T14 LS I4; 2476 cc BMW M502 V8; 2351 cc Aquilon sv V8
- Transmission: 4-speed manual all-synchromesh

Dimensions
- Wheelbase: 2,500 mm (98.4 in)
- Length: 4,200 mm (165.4 in)
- Width: 1,640 mm (64.6 in)
- Height: 1,320 mm (52.0 in)

The Talbot-Lago Sport is a coupé-bodied sports car introduced by the manufacturer in May 1955 that was Talbot-Lago's last production model. About 71 examples were built. After a couple of years the Talbot-designed engine was replaced with a BMW unit and the car was rebranded as the Talbot-Lago America; the final cars used Simca's flathead V8 of pre-war Ford origins.

The car's launch was delayed by the company's parlous financial condition, which continued to undermine its fortunes until the last cars were made, probably in 1959.

== History ==
=== T 14 LS ===
At the 1954 Paris Motor Show, Talbot-Lago presented their last new engine: the new four-cylinder still had the typical twin laterally mounted camshafts, although it was upgraded to five main bearings. The new 120 PS (88 kW) 2,491 cc engine was called the T14 LS, but it did not have a car to go in until May 1955 when the Talbot-Lago 2500 Coupé T14 LS (for "Lago Sport") was finally presented. In addition to its intended use for a road going car, the engine's size, precisely conforming to the racing engine category of 2.5-litre engines without compressors, hint at Antonio Lago’s other ambitions for the new power unit.

The first car had all-aluminium bodywork, executed by Carlo Delaisse (stylist for coachbuilders Letourneur & Marchand as well as Chapron), a smaller version of the design used on the preceding T 26 GSL. Later cars used more steel in their construction. 54 of these coupés were built, but they proved hard to sell - the stylish bodywork couldn't quite hide the thirties' underpinnings.

=== T14 America ===
The engine developed for the car by Talbot proved unacceptably fragile. Lacking the resources to engineer the necessary improvements, for 1957 Talbot-Lago had to resort to buying in an engine. They chose BMW's 2580 cc, light-metal OHV V8 unit, albeit with the bore diameter slightly reduced, to 72.5 mm, which gave rise to a 2476 cc engine displacement – positioning the car (just) within the 14CV car tax band. Claimed power climbed to 138 PS (101 kW), considerably higher than BMW's own numbers. Reflecting the company's export plans, Talbot now rebranded the car as the "Talbot Lago America" and (finally) came into line with other French automakers by placing the driver on the left side of the car.

Market response remained lukewarm, however, and only about a dozen of the BMW-powered Talbot Lago Americas were produced. It was now, in the early summer of 1958, that Tony Lago decided to accept an offer from Simca president, Henri Pigozzi, for the sale of the Talbot brand to Simca. The sale of the business went ahead in 1959.

=== Simca-engined Americas ===
With the sale of the business to Simca, the new owners found themselves with the final handful of the Talbot Lago Americas, which were still awaiting engines. Neither BMW nor Simca desired that the French company produce cars with BMW engines, and the only solution available was to fit the last batch of cars with Simca's own 2351 cc V8. This engine had its roots in 1930s Detroit, and was originally provided by Ford to give the (then) Ford Vedette produced by their French subsidiary a flavor of the driving experience offered by an unstressed US style V8 sedan. It was by no stretch of the imagination an engine for a sports car, and even with a second carburetor produced only 95 PS (70 kW), as against the 138 PS (101 kW) of the BMW-engined cars from the previous year's production. Claimed top speed was now reduced to 165 km/h (103 mph) in place of the 200 km/h (124 mph) listed the previous year. In addition to installing their V8 engine, Simca replaced the laterally sliding windows with units which wound down into the door in the conventional manner. The change also involved adding front quarter lights / quarter windows at the front end of each door.

At the 1959 Paris Motor Show a stand had been booked for what was by now the Simca-Talbot brand, but a late decision was taken not to exhibit a Lago America, and the stand was instead given up to a hastily constructed "motorshow special" prototype of which, after the motor show, nothing more would be heard. The Simca-engined cars, still bearing a list price in excess of 2,000,000 Francs, proved hard to sell, with just five of the Simca-powered car sold according to one source. No further cars were produced once the final batch of cars from the Talbot production era, having received their Simca engines and window modifications, had been disposed of.
