= Antonio Lago =

Italian engineer (1893–1960)

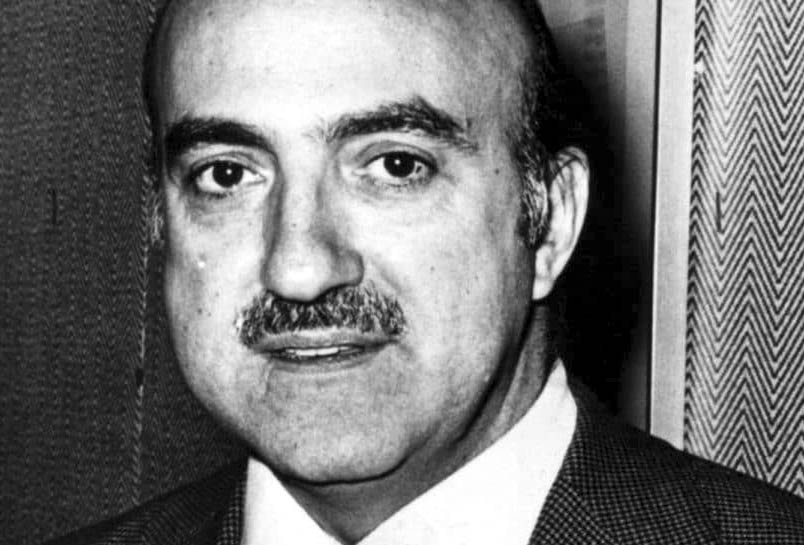
- Born: Antonio Franco Lago; 28 March 1893; Venice
- Died: 1 December 1960 (aged 67); Paris
- Occupation: Engineer
- Known for: Founder of Talbot-Lago

Antonio Franco Lago (Venice, 28 March 1893 – Paris, 1 December 1960) was an Italian engineer and motor-industry entrepreneur. In 1936 he bought Automobiles Talbot S.A. from his employers, the collapsed Anglo-French S.T.D. Motors combine, and founded the motor-racing marque Talbot-Lago.

The French government awarded him the Legion d’Honneur for the glory he brought to France.

== Biography ==
=== Early life ===
Lago was born in Venice in 1893, but the family moved to Bergamo, where his father was manager (or owner) of the municipal theatre. He grew up in the company of actors, musicians and government officials, developing relationships with leaders such as Pope John XXIII and Benito Mussolini. He graduated in engineering from the Politecnico di Milano.

In 1915 he joined the Italian Air Force, where he achieved the rank of major during the First World War.

=== Politics ===
Although Lago was a founding member (one of the first 50) of the Italian National Fascist Party, he later became outspokenly critical of fascism, which led to a violent dispute with Benito Mussolini, necessitating his subsequent fleeing to France. In an era of volatile politics he always carried a hand grenade. In 1919 three members of the fascist youth entered a trattoria looking for him, but as they shot the two owners he threw the grenade and ran out the back door. One of the fascists was killed and Lago fled to Paris, reportedly never returning to Italy.

=== Engineering ===
Lago worked for Pratt and Whitney in Southern California before settling in England in the 1920s, where he changed his name to Anthony. He represented Isotta Fraschini at showrooms in North Audley Street, Mayfair and was technical director of L.A.P. Engineering. (Note: Agents for L.A.P. carburettors(Veteran-Edwardian-Vintage. Motor Sport, Page 68, February 1984), Restelli cars made by Officine Meccaniche Isolabella SA in Milan and head conversion kits for Fiat cars made by Silvani (Automobile Quarterly, 1985, Volume 23, Issue 4)) He then became a director of Self-Changing Gears Ltd owned by Walter Gordon Wilson and John Davenport Siddeley which manufactured Wilson pre-selector gearboxes, and persuaded S.T.D. Motors and others of the gearbox's merits. He acquired the rights to export Wilson gearboxes from England.

== Automobiles Talbot S.A. ==
In 1933 Lago moved to France to manage the failing French subsidiary of S.T.D. Motors, Automobiles Talbot S.A. Starved of capital it now had antiquated plant and aging products. During the 1920s Louis Coatalen had overspent Sunbeam's funds on Grand Prix racing. Not only had this hampered plant and product development but it was Sunbeam's heavy borrowing brought S.T.D. Motors to its knees when it fell due for repayment in mid 1934. S T D Motors was forced to sell profitable Clément-Talbot or Talbot London, Sunbeam which now had little value —both bought by the Rootes brothers— and Automobiles Talbot S.A. which was unsaleable being hopelessly indebted to its French bankers. A complete collapse of the French company proved unavoidable.

Lago was a "ruthless businessman with great charm". In 1933 he had persuaded the other directors of S T D Motors that with him as director Automobiles Talbot France could be back on its feet in 18 months. They paid his salary whilst he transformed the company and they also agreed to share any profits from the sale. His three pronged rescue plan for Talbot involved reducing expenses; building light sporting cars and using racing for development and publicity. He insisted that the racing cars should be closely related to Talbot production models.

When, at the end of 1934, Automobiles Talbot S.A. was forced into receivership Lago managed to convert his rights to export Wilson gearboxes into an option to purchase the factory and its plant and machinery at Suresnes. At a cost of £63,000 ([approx Euro 40,000 as of 2012) he and his investors finally acquired the business of Automobiles Talbot S.A. in mid-1936 and S T D Motors was liquidated.

=== Marketing ===
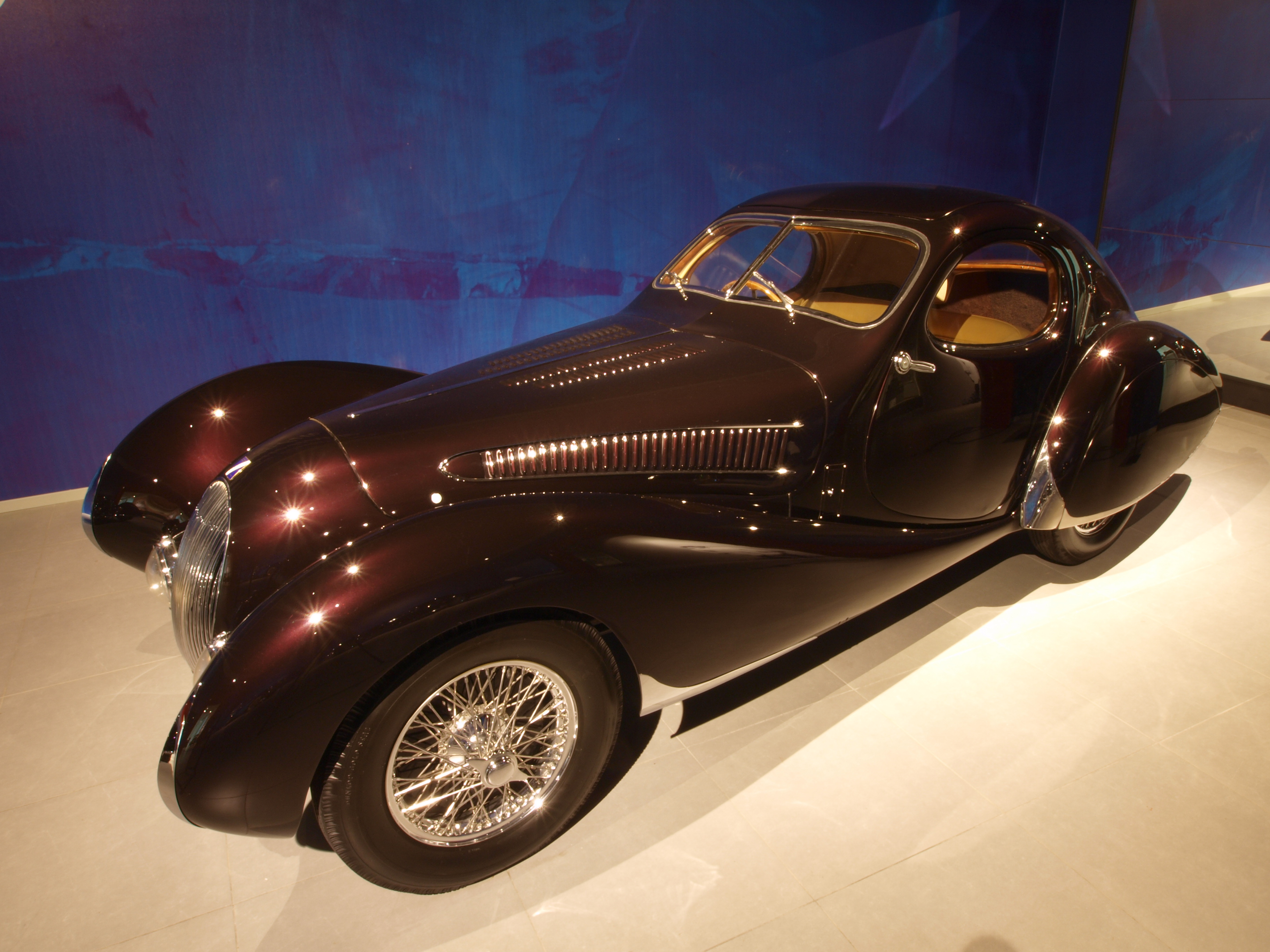
1937 Talbot Lago T150 SS. Teardrop Coupe bodywork by Figoni & Falaschi

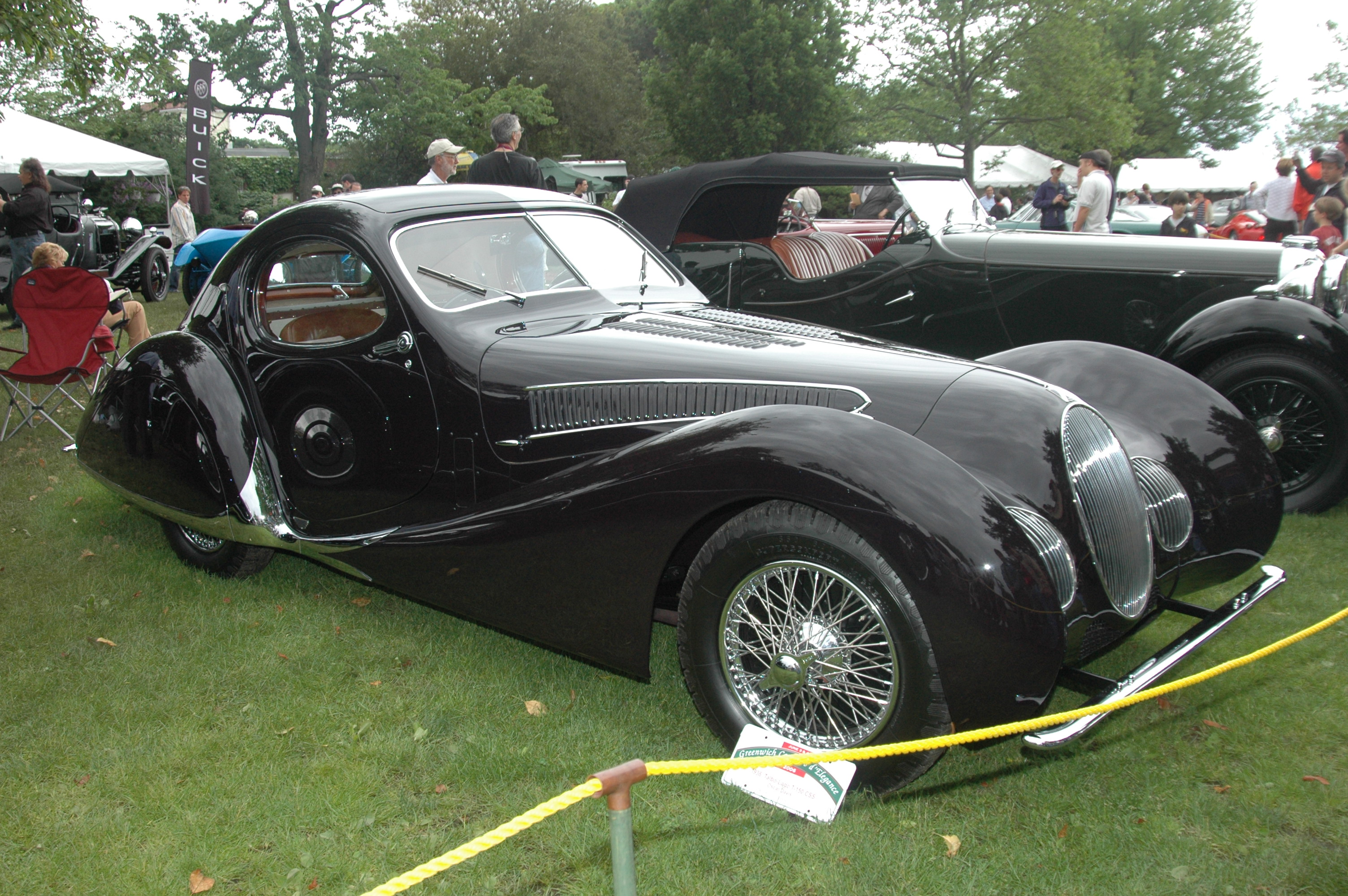
1938 Talbot-Lago T-150 CSS. Body by Figoni & Falaschi

Walter Becchia, now best known for designing the Citroen 2CV's flat twin engine during the Second World War's German Occupation, moved from Fiat to S T D Motors' Sunbeam racing in 1923. In June 1934 he produced the first Talbot-Lago T150 model. Antonio Lago organised its promotion. In June three cars, painted in the French Tricolour of red, white and blue, were entered in a Concours d'Elegance in the Bois de Boulogne and driven by well-known female racing drivers wearing tailored outfits that matched the cars. The following weekend the same cars and ladies were presented to the French motoring industry at the Prince of Wales hotel, followed by another concours sponsored by a Paris newspaper. Sales were slow due to French recession and lack of racing success so Lago found a new publicity niche, covering 100 miles in one hour at the Autodrome de Linas-Montlhéry.

=== Scandal ===
Capitalising on the company's success in sportscar racing, Lago announced plans to build a 3-litre V16-engined car for the 1938 Grand Prix season. He showed the blueprints to the Comité de la Souscription Nationale pour le Fonds de Course (a government body that used public money to try to achieve success in motor racing) and received a 600,000-franc subsidy (approx Euro 300,000 as of 2012), but the V16 never appeared, and it was believed that he used the money to build a factory for Pratt & Whitney aircraft engines.

=== Business ===
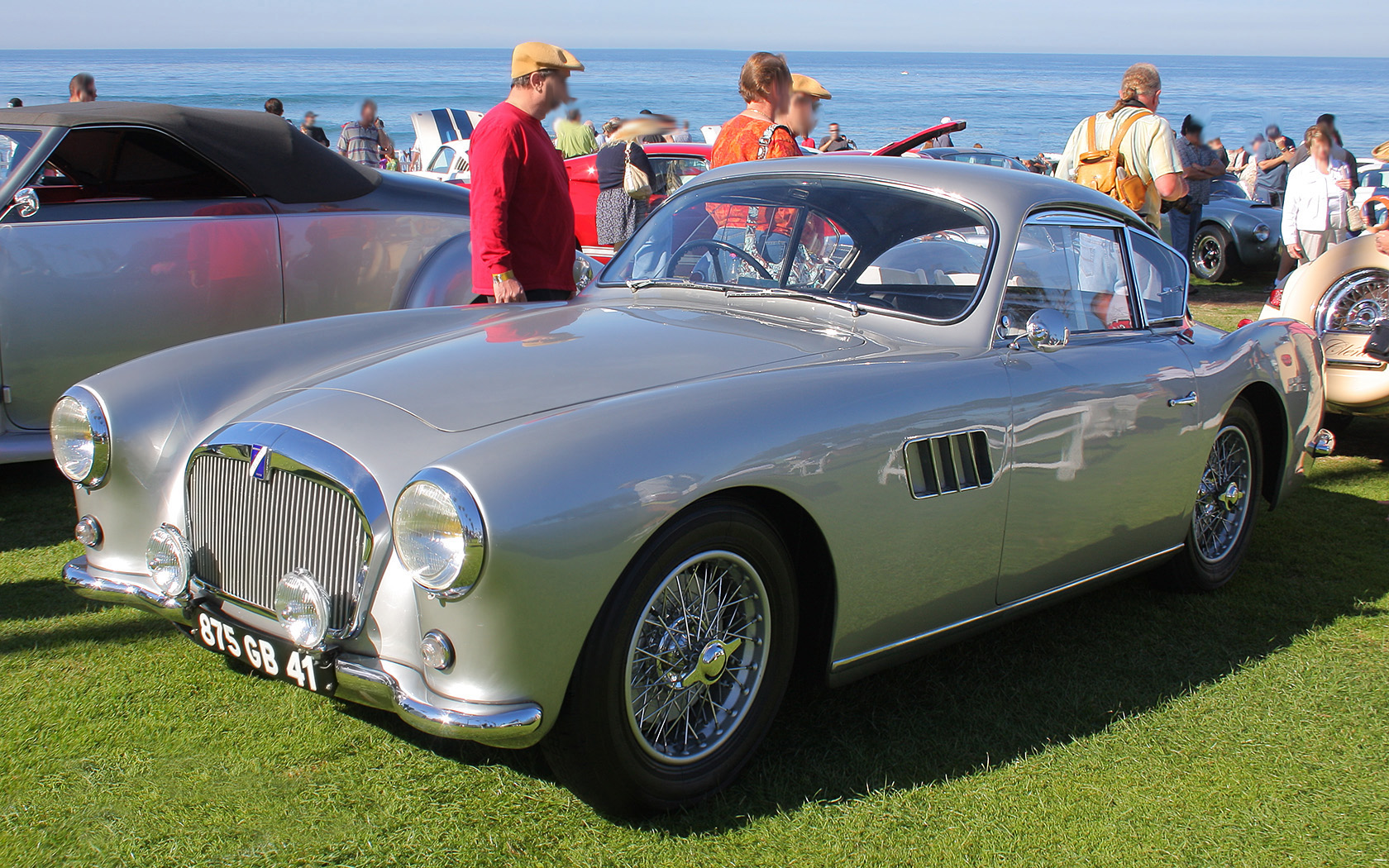
Talbot Lago Sport

Despite going into receivership four times, Lago kept the business running until 1958, when he sold it to Simca.

== Death and commemoration ==
Antonio Lago was awarded the Legion d’Honneur by the French government "for the glory he brought to France on the race course". He died in Paris in December 1960. He is buried in the cemetery of Predore, the village where he lived.

== See also ==
- Clément-Talbot
- Darracq
- Sunbeam-Talbot
- Sunbeam-Talbot-Darracq
- Talbot
- Talbot-Lago
