= Alexandre Darracq =

French engineer and automobile manufacturer (1855–1931)

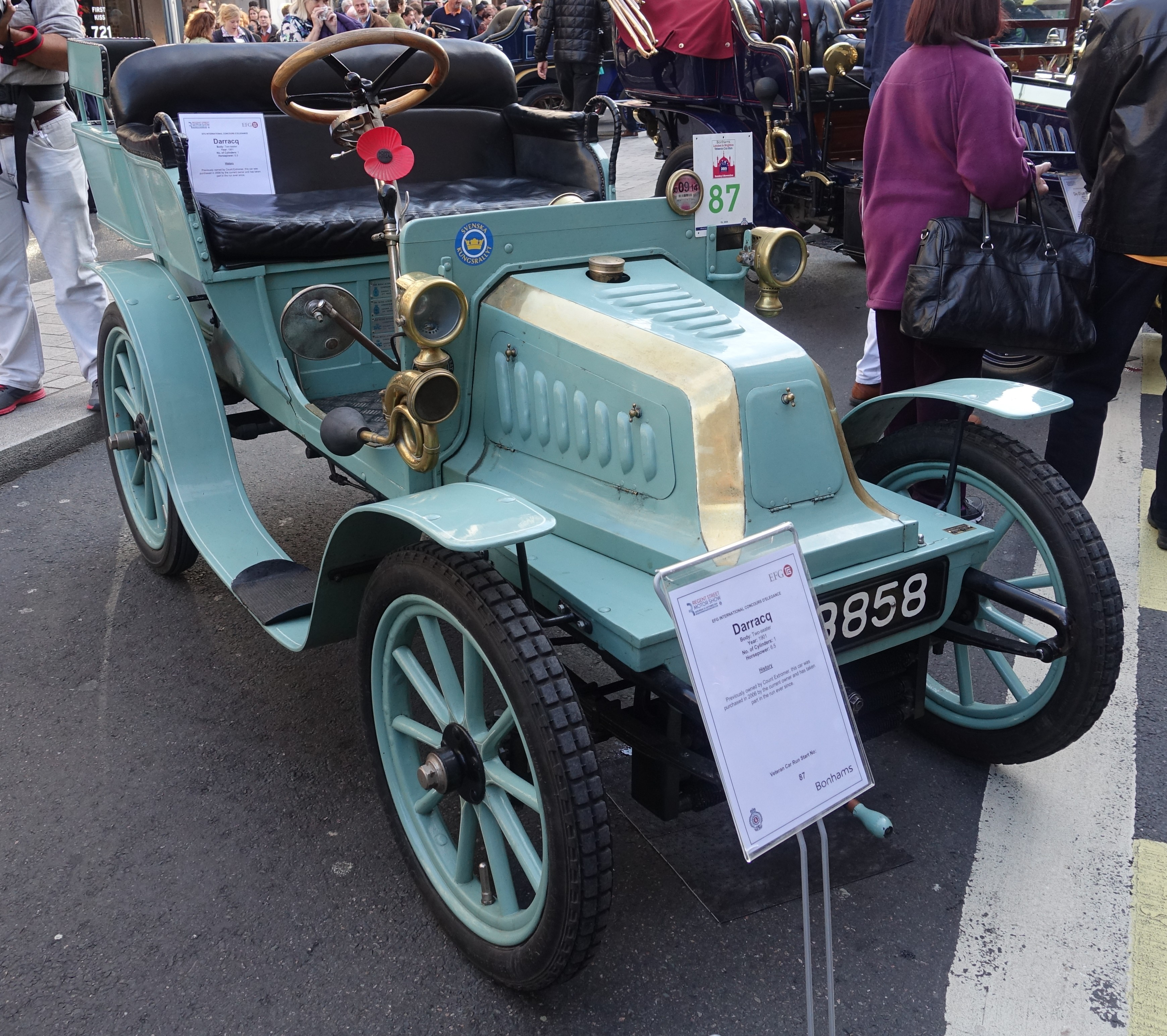
Darracq 6,5 CV (1901)

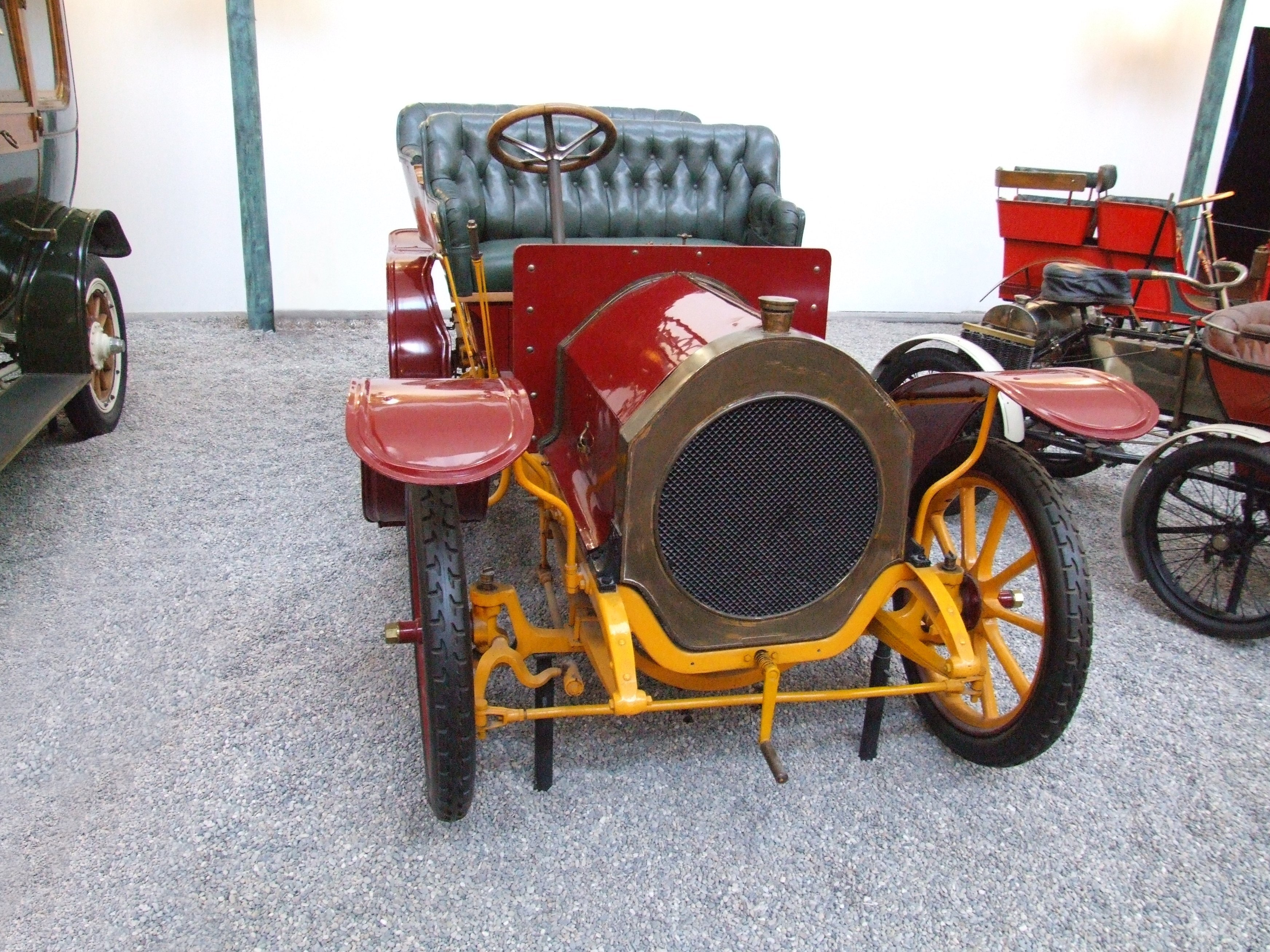
Gladiator Double Phaeton from 1907, 2 cylinder, 2423 cc, 12 PS, 45 km/h, Cité de l’Automobile – Musée National – Collection Schlumpf, Mulhouse, France

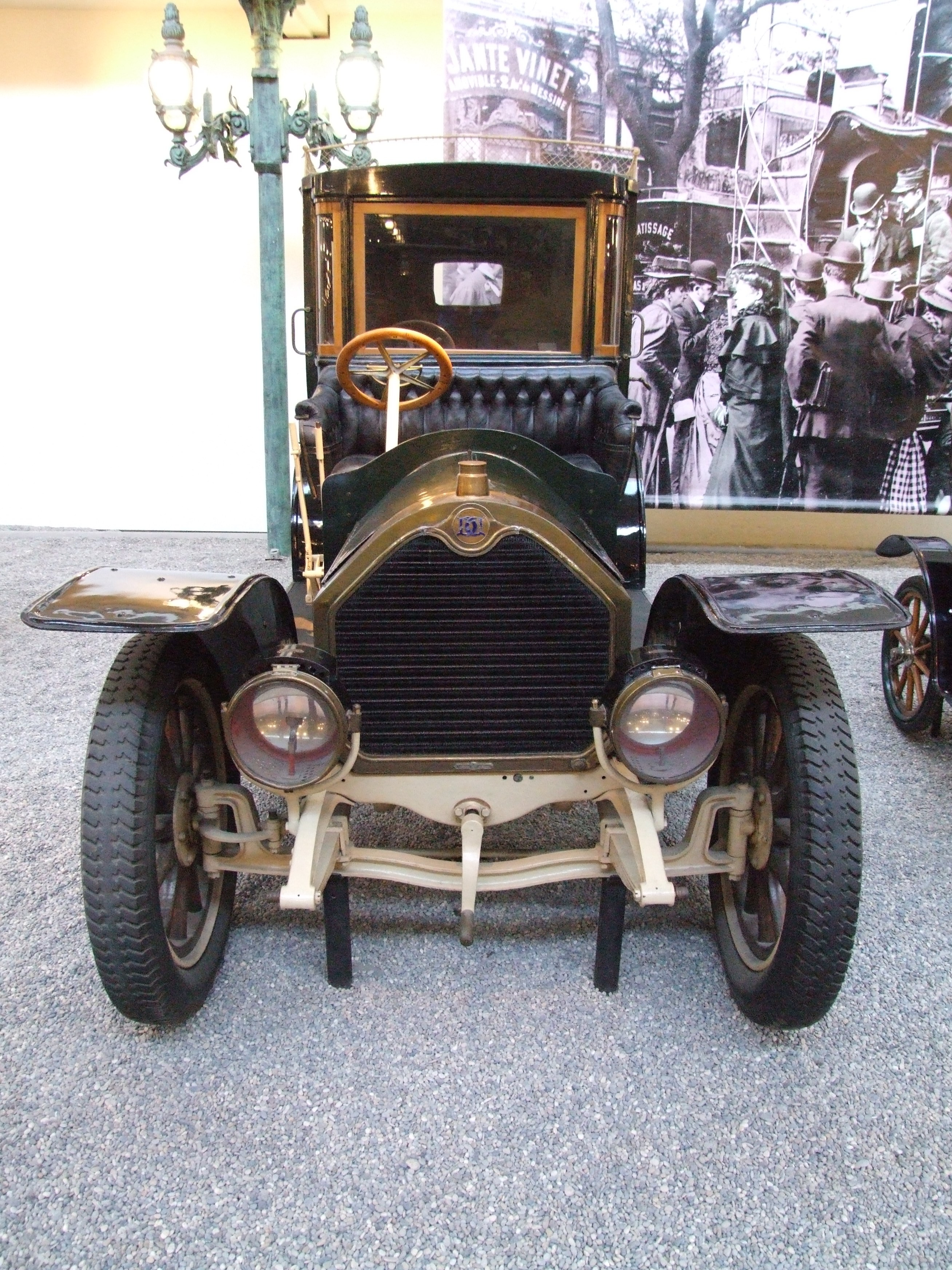
Darracq Coupé Chauffeur SS 20/28, 1907, 4 cylinder, 28,5 PS, 4728 cc, 70 km/h, Cité de l’Automobile – Musée National – Collection Schlumpf, Mulhouse, France

Alexandre Darracq (Note: French pronunciation: [alɛksɑ̃dʁ daʁak]) (10 November 1855 – 1931) was a French investor, engineer, cycle manufacturer and automobile manufacturer. By 1904, Darracq was producing more than ten percent of all automobiles in France and he sold a substantial part of his business to British investors. He became fascinated by the possibilities of a rotary valve engine, put it into production and although it became a disaster for Darracq & Cie, persisted in installing it in Darracq products. He was obliged to retire in June 1912 aged 56. After the Armistice of Compiègne, his name was dropped from his Suresnes factory's mass-produced products.

In 1906 he founded Società Anonima Italiana Darracq (S.A.I.D.) in Milan, Italy, which became [Società] Anonima Lombarda Fabbrica Automobili (A.L.F.A.) in 1910 and eventually Alfa Romeo.

== Sewing machines and cycles ==
Born Pierre Alexandre Darracq in Bordeaux, France, of Basque parents, he trained as a draftsman at the Arsenal in Tarbes, in the Hautes-Pyrénées département. He later worked at the Hurtu factory manufacturing sewing machines. Darracq designed a machine that won a gold medal at the 1889 Paris exhibition. He established the Gladiator Cycle Company in 1891. He sold his very successful company in 1896 for a substantial amount and for a short time went into the business of manufacturing electric cars as well as acquiring an interest in rotary engined Millet motorcycles.

== Automobiles ==
He established Automobiles Darracq France in Suresnes, near Paris where he pioneered the making of the chassis from pressed steel and the use of production machinery in place of hand labor. Despite his establishing an automobile business, and having taken driving lessons in July 1896, Darracq did not like driving cars or even being driven in them. For him, it was just pursuing his interest in manufacturing and making money.

By 1904, Darracq was producing more than ten percent of all automobiles in France. His company became involved with motor racing, winning a number of major races, including the 1905 and 1906 Vanderbilt Cup in the United States and twice setting a new land speed record in 1904 and 1905. Racing success raised the image of the Darracq marque so he was able to expand to England and form licensing partnerships.

== London ==
In 1904 he sold his business to British investors who incorporated A Darracq and Co in which he held a substantial shareholding and was a director. He remained manager of the enterprise. The following year A Darracq and Company was listed on the London Stock Exchange but reformed for the purpose as A. Darracq and Company (1905) Limited. Thereafter financial control remained in London.

== Italy and Germany ==
The company that became Alfa Romeo was founded by Darracq as Società Anonima Italiana Darracq (S.A.I.D.) in 1906. It became A.L.F.A. ("[Società] Anonima Lombarda Fabbrica Automobili", "Lombard Automobile Factory Company") on 24 June 1910, in Milan.

Darracq raised substantial capital through share issues with Cavaliere Ugo Stella, managing director of S.A.I.D and subsequently A.L.F.A., with Adam Opel in Germany and in Vitoria in the Basque region of Spain.

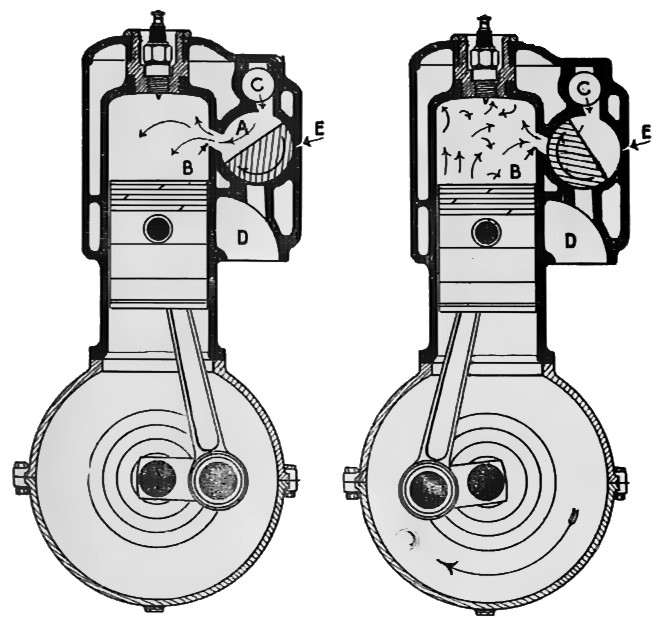
Darracq rotary-valve engine

After personally insisting the new 1911 model employ the Henriod rotary valve engine, Alexadre Darracq resigned.

== Later life and death ==
In mid-1912, Darracq resigned, having earlier sold out to British investors, and pursued other interests including running the Casino at Deauville. After World War I, he retired to the French Riviera where he joined with Belgian investors that took over the troubled luxury Hotel Negresco in Nice.

He died in 1931 at his home in Monte Carlo and was interred next to his wife Louise (1850–1920) in the family mausoleum in the Père Lachaise Cemetery in Paris.
