= Darracq and Company London =

Anglo-French automotive/aero-engine manufacturer)

Darracq and Company
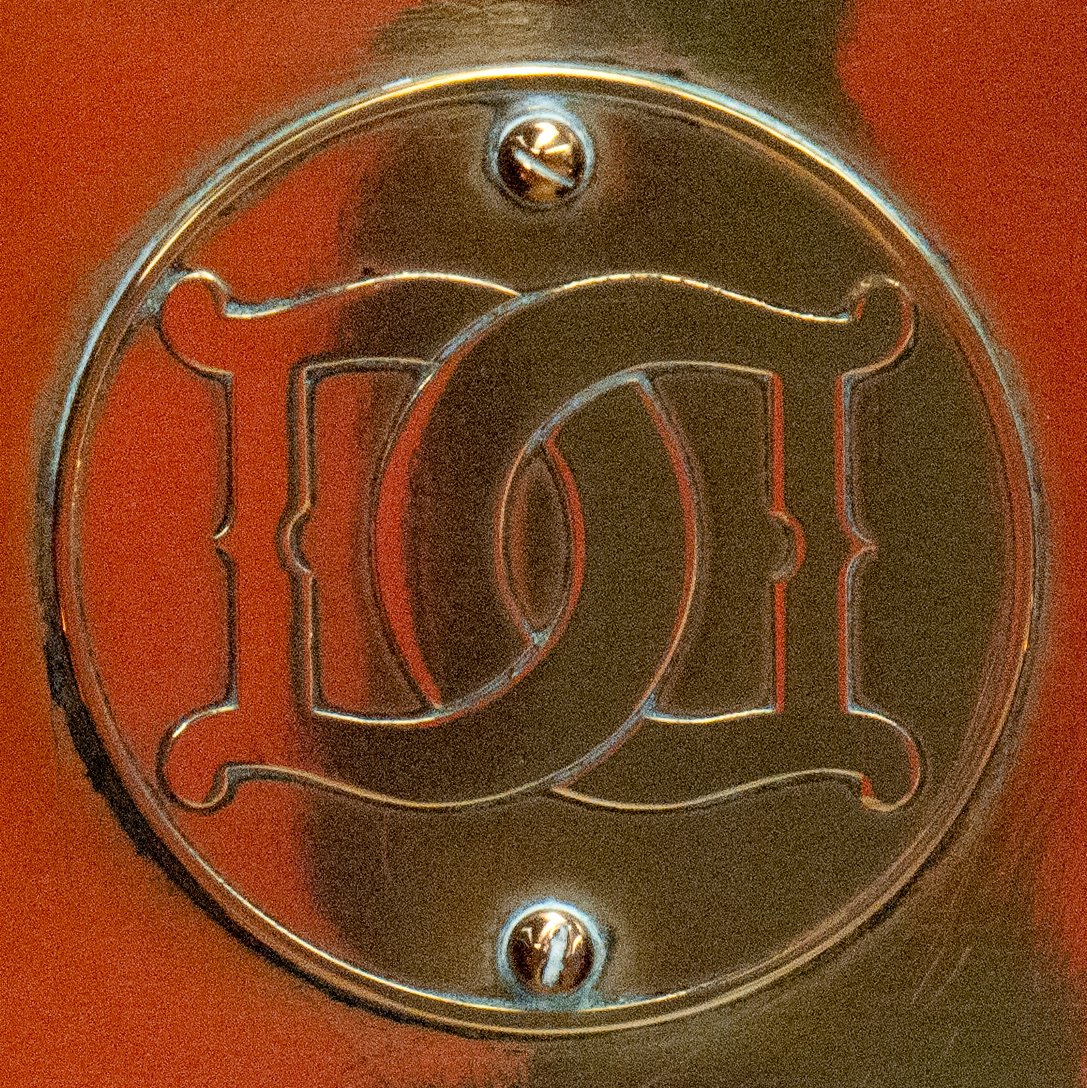
- Industry: Automotive
- Founded: 1902
- Key people: Alexandre Darracq, managing director
- Products: Automotive, cars and racing cars and components
- Brands: Darracq; Sunbeam; Talbot
- Subsidiaries: Paris; 1916 Société Anonyme Automobiles Darracq /; 1920 Société Anonyme Automobiles Talbot-Darracq /; 1922 Société Anonyme Automobiles Talbot; London; 1916 Darracq Motor Engineering Company; 1919 Clément-Talbot; 1920 W & G Du Cros; Wolverhampton; 1920 Sunbeam Motor Car Company; Worcester; 1919 Heenan & Froude; Leeds; 1920 Jonas Woodhead

A Darracq and Company Limited, was a British-French manufacturer of motor cars between 1902 and 1920, which evolved from A. Darracq et Cie, and became S.T.D. Motors Limited.

A. Darracq et Cie, a French manufacturer of motor vehicles and aero engines based in Suresnes near Paris, was founded in 1896 by Alexandre Darracq after selling his Gladiator Bicycle business. In 1902 Darracq sold A. Darracq et Cie to A Darracq and Company Limited of England, taking a substantial shareholding himself.

Darracq continued to run the business from Paris until retiring in 1913 following years of financial difficulties. He had unsuccessfully introduced an unproven unorthodox engine in 1911 and neglected Suresnes' popular conventional products.

After Darracq & Company's purchase of the Sunbeam Motor Car Company in 1920 the firm was renamed S.T.D. Motors Limited, recognizing the gathering of Sunbeam, Talbot, and Darracq under one ownership. In 1922 the Darracq name was dropped from all products, the Suresnes business was renamed Automobiles Talbot, and the Suresnes products were branded just Talbot. The Suresnes business continued, still under British control, under the name Talbot until 1935, when it was acquired by investors led by the Suresnes factory's managing director, Antonio Lago.

== A Darracq and Company Limited ==
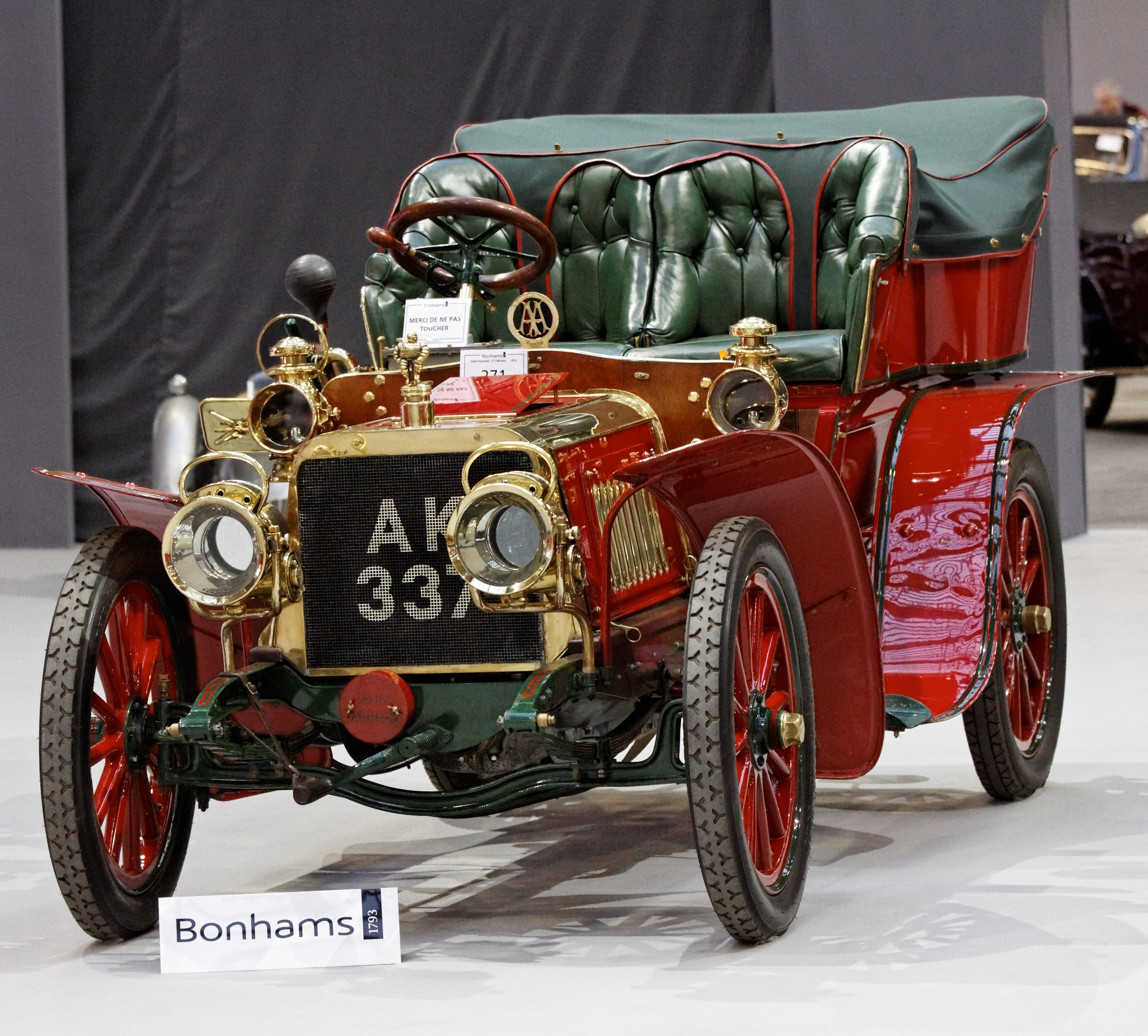
Darracq's famous "flying" Fifteen rear entrance tonneau body

A Darracq et Cie was sold 30 September 1902 to a newly created English firm, A Darracq and Company Limited. (Note: Doings of Public Companies A. Darracq and Co. (Limited). — Capital £375,000 in £1 shares (100,000 six per cent cumulative preference). Object, to acquire the business of A Darracq et Cie, carrying on business at Suresnes, France, and elsewhere; to enter into a deed of contribution between A. Darracq et Cie and this company for the transfer to this company of the said business in consideration of an allotment of 100,000 preference shares and 271,274 fully-paid ordinary shares whereof the Anglo-French Motor Syndicate (Limited) is to receive 57,109 shares in respect of services rendered and expenses incurred by in the formation of this company. ‘’The Automotor Journal’’ page 364 11 April 1903) The attraction for the British venture capitalists was that French automobile technology and industry experience led the world. It was incorporated in England because French law made the necessary flotation processes more difficult than English law. The perception from across the Atlantic in USA was that French industry was "offloading" on British investors. The English financial group was headed by William Beilby Avery of W & T Avery, a Birmingham scales manufacturer, J S Smith-Winby a London lawyer and a retired army officer, Colonel A Rawlinson. They bought A Darracq et Cie and selling it to other investors for five times their purchase price. Darracq received slightly less than 50 percent of the shares in the new company. There was no public offering, eight other investors took up the rest of the shares.

Further capital was raised and large sums were spent on factory expansion. The Suresnes site was expanded to some four acres, and in England extensive premises were bought.

The Darracq & Co automobile company prospered, such that, by 1903, four models were offered: a 1.1-litre single, a 1.3 L and 1.9 L twin, and a 3.8 L four. The 1904 models abandoned flitch-plated wood chassis for pressed steel, and the new Flying Fifteen, powered by a 3-litre four, had its chassis made from a single sheet of steel. This car was Alexandre Darracq's chef d'oeuvre. There was nothing outstanding in its design but "every part was in such perfect balance and harmony" it became an outstanding model. Its exceptional quality helped the company capture a ten percent share of the French auto market. In late 1904 the chairman reported sales were up by 20 per cent though increased costs meant the profit had risen more slowly. But what was more important was they had many more orders than they could fill and the only solution was to enlarge the factory by as much as 50 per cent. Almost 75 per cent of 1904 output was exported.

At the following annual general meeting, twelve months later, the chairman was able to tell shareholders all the six speed records of the automobile world were held by Darracq cars and they had all been held more than twelve months and yet another had recently been added by K Lee Guinness. He also reported that during 1905 a large property had been bought in Lambeth for examining adjusting and stocking new cars ready for the peak sales period.

An announcement followed two days later of a scheme of reconstitution of the company to raise more capital for further expansion. The reconstituted company was named A Darracq and Company (1905) Limited. Paris resident Alexander Darracq remained managing director, Rawlinson was appointed managing director of the London branch. The "reconstitution" was to circumvent some holders of the company's shares who were unwilling to share the prosperity and blocked proposed new issues. So the company was (technically) sold, they were paid out and obliged to buy new shares like anyone else. J S Smith-Winby continued as chairman. (Note: Board 1905 John Sidney Smith-Winby (c.1863–1920), chairman; promoter and organiser; director of oil, steel and insurance companies Sir William B Avery, Baronet, deputy chairman; philatelist and company director, Avery Scales Alexandre Darracq Edward Festus Kelly (1854–1939), of Kelly's Directory Joseph Malesset, manufacturer of soda siphons, Paris William Weir, engineer Weir Group A Rawlinson, Toby Rawlinson pilot and motor racing driver, managing director of the London branch.) After this restructure over 80 per cent of the shares were held in England.

Meanwhile, there was a move towards building larger cars and by 1907 there was one model with an 11.5-litre engine.

Alexandre Darracq had long been interested in heavy vehicles for the carriage of people and the transport of goods. On his advice the company entered into a joint venture with Léon Serpollet in 1905 to build steam-powered buses. A new factory was built at Suresnes capable of making one hundred chassis each month but the buses were not successful and in 1910 the directors had to tell their shareholders they had written off £156,000 of investment in heavy steam vehicles.

=== Management changes ===
==== Alexandre Darracq retires ====
In April 1908, the directors found it necessary to formally deny rumours of Alexandre Darracq's intention to resign, noting his contract did not expire until September 1910.

Returning to an 1898 idea by M. Darracq to build low-cost, good-quality cars, much as Henry Ford was doing with the Ford Model T, Darracq & Co introduced a £260 14–16 hp (10–12 kW; 14–16 PS) model at the very end of 1911. These, at the founder's insistence, would all be cursed with the Henriod (Note: C E Henriod & Cie manufacturers of the change-speed rear axles where the change-speed box forms part of the differential casing) rotary valve engine, which was underpowered and prone to seizing. The new engine's failure was reported by Darracq & Co to its shareholders to be no more than the difficulty of achieving quantity production. It proved disastrous to the marque, and eventually Alexandre Darracq, left, retiring in late 1911.

==== Paul Ribeyrolles ====
In late 1911, Alexandre Darracq was replaced by a new managing director, chief engineer Paul Ribeyrolles, one-time head of Darracq's Gladiator Cycle Company and, unlike Darracq, a motor racing enthusiast. In June 1912, Darracq, surrounded by "new blood", resigned, he had already successfully speculated on then sold all his shares. A main board director, Hopkins, was sent to Paris to take charge of general administration, and Owen Clegg (Note: Owen Clegg (1877–1940) born Shipley died Knaresborough, West Riding. Rose to be works manager at Wolseley, then went to Rover as chief designer in September 1910, moved on in March 1912 to works manager of Darracq at Suresnes. Soon appointed chief engineer, (managing) director and main board director and, post-Armistice, director of Sunbeam and Clément-Talbot. Replaced in 1934 by Anthony Lago and appointed in 1935 with the Air Ministry in its Production Directorate under Lord Weir, died 1940, widow 1965) was sent to Suresnes from Rover in Coventry and appointed works manager. At the end of 1912, the chairman reassured shareholders a return on their investment in the valveless motor would arrive in 1913.

By February 1913, shareholders had set up their own inquiry into the unsatisfactory position of the business and it reported poor co-operation between London and Suresnes, they had been pulling against each other, furthermore there had been considerable loss through "recent changes in personnel". The committee then went on record saying:

"M. Darracq, as a typical Frenchman, probably possessed far more originality and initiative than any Englishman of corresponding situation, but, if he displayed a failing, it was that he, like most of his brilliant race, lacked the Englishman's pertinacity, and, after a time, seemed to lose interest, as it were, in his original conceptions without making any serious effort to strike out a fresh line."

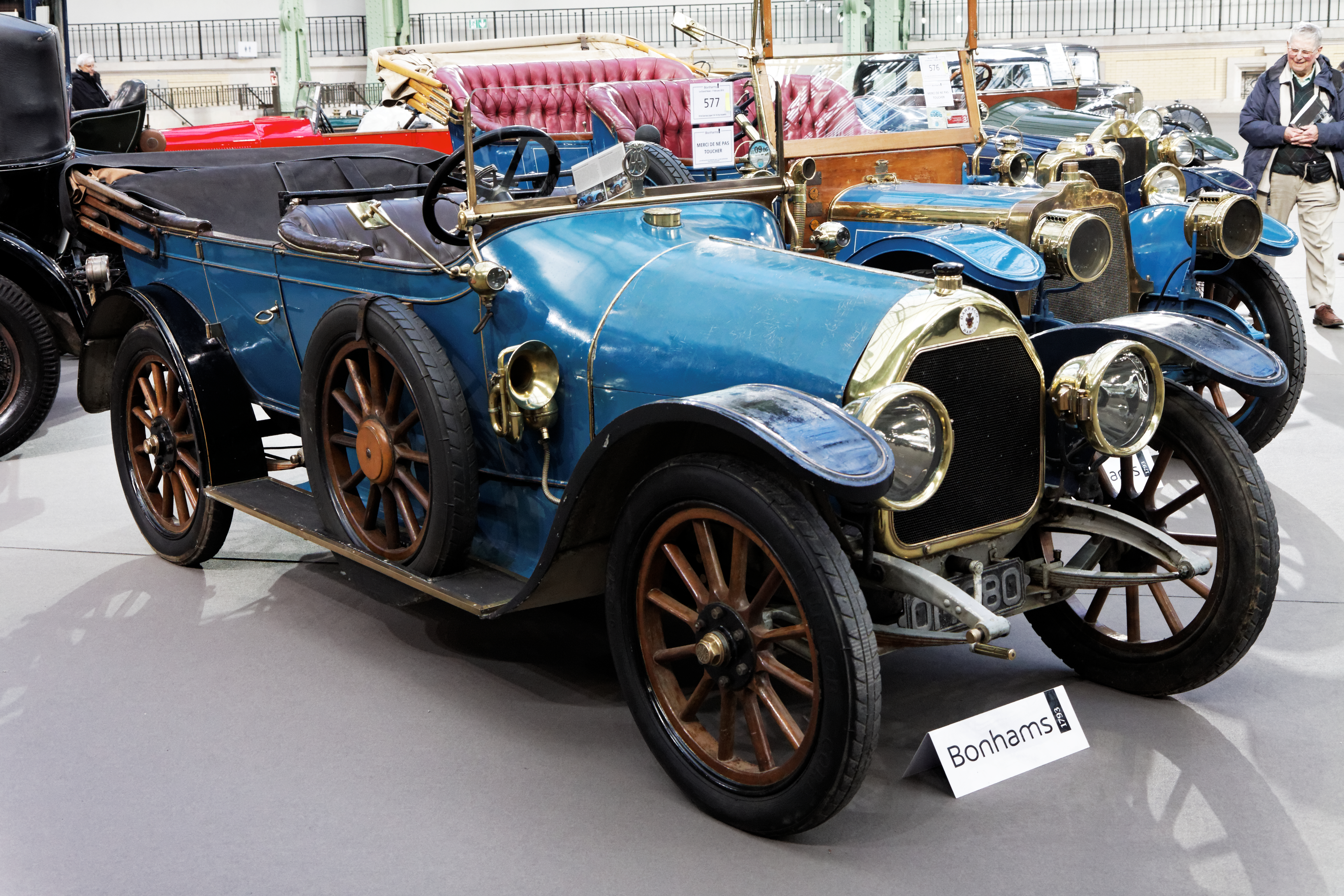
Darracq 16 horsepower type V14

==== Norman Craig ====
The chairman of the investigating committee, Norman Craig, was appointed chairman of Darracq & Company. Works manager Owen Clegg, designer of the proven Rover Twelve, sensibly copied the Twelve for Darracq & Co's new model. The factory at Suresnes was retooled for mass production, making it one of the first in the industry to do so. The 16hp Clegg-Darracq was joined by an equally reliable 2.1-litre 12hp car, and soon the factory was turning out sixty cars a week; by 1914, 1,200 men rolled out fourteen cars a day.

=== Société Anonyme Automobiles Darracq ===
Darracq & Co factory was switched to the production of various war materials during World War I. In 1916, aside from the land and buildings, all the Suresnes assets were transferred to Société Anonyme Automobiles Darracq, a new company incorporated in France for the purpose; British assets were transferred the British Darracq Motor Engineering Company. Suresnes land and buildings were transferred to Darracq Proprietary Company Limited of London and leased back to SA Darracq.

=== Acquisitions ===
In the wake of WWI Darracq & Company went on a buying spree, mainly of automobile-related companies. After the Armistice of 11 November 1918, it bought Heenan & Froude, constructional engineers, of Worcester and Manchester. At the end of 1919 Darracq & Co bought Clément-Talbot. In early 1920 Jonas Woodhead & Sons of Leeds, suppliers of springs for cars, was acquired. In June 1920 Darracq & Company they bought control of Sunbeam Motor Car Company. In August W & G Du Cros of Acton, taxi operators and van, lorry, bus and ambulance body builders, was purchased.

== S.T.D. Motors Limited ==
In August 1920, A Darracq and Company (1905) Limited was renamed S.T.D. Motors Limited to recognise the gathering together of Sunbeam Talbot and Darracq under one ownership. The Sunbeam car would continue to be made at Moorfield Works, Wolverhampton, the Talbot at Clément-Talbot in North Kensington, and the Darracq car at Suresnes. Buying, selling, and advertising were all centralised with S.T.D. in Britain All businesses retained their separate identities.

=== Talbot-Darracq ===
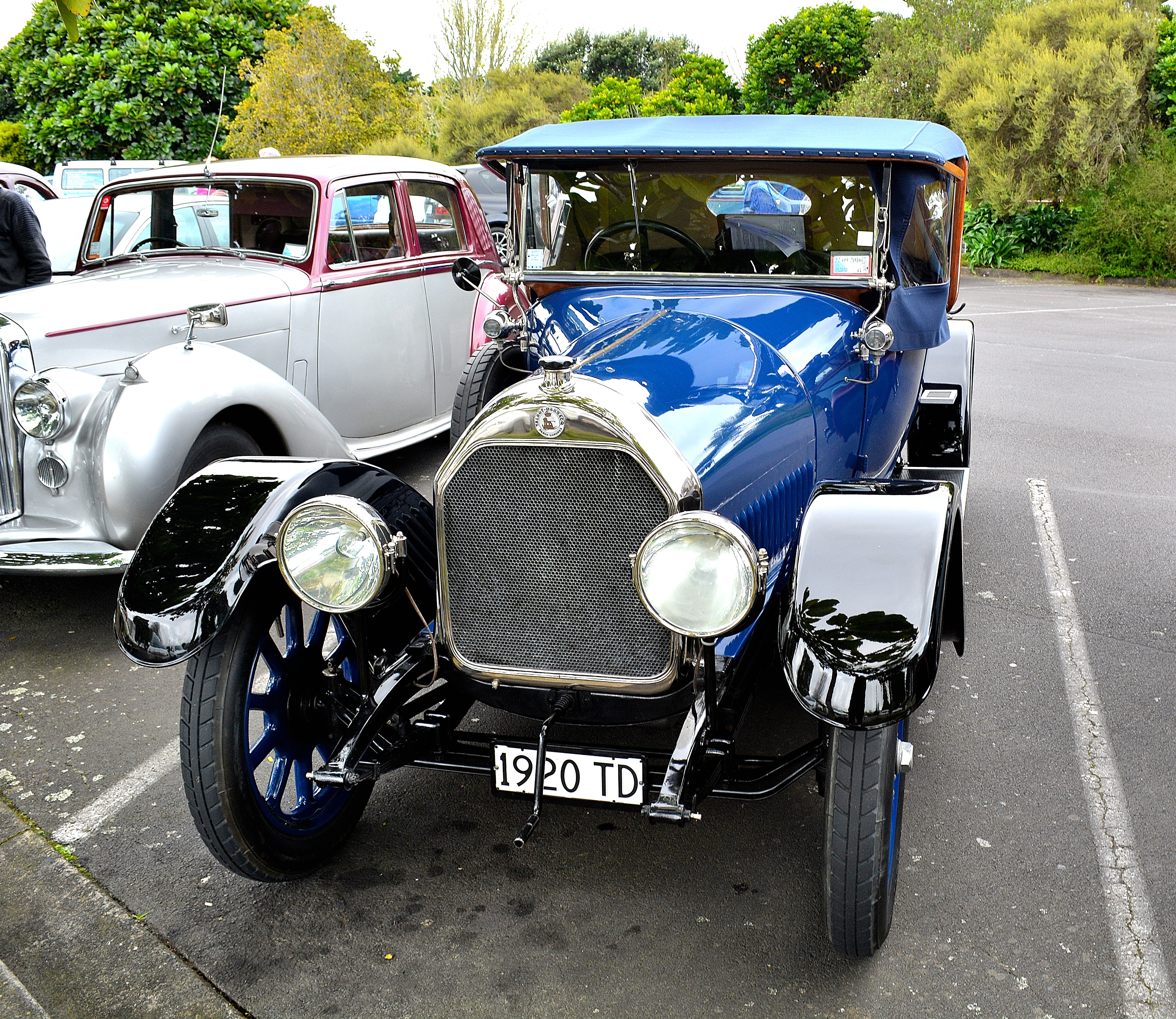
1920 Talbot-Darracq 4.6-litre 20hp V8 drophead coupé built in France and branded Talbot-Darracq for sale in England

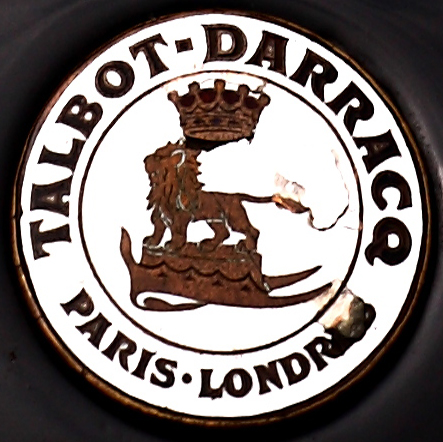
Talbot-Darracq logo

Following the inclusion of Clément Talbot in the S.T.D. group Suresnes products were branded Talbot-Darracq, but the name Darracq was dropped from this combination in 1922. Cars made by Automobiles Talbot imported from France to England were renamed Darracq — for the first two years they were badged Talbot Darracq— to avoid confusion with the English Clément-Talbot products.

They were imported and sold in England by Darracq Motor Engineering Company.

=== S.T.D. Motors in 1924 ===
- Clément-Talbot of North Kensington, London: Talbot cars
- Darracq Motor Engineering Company of Fulham London: motorcar bodies
- Sunbeam Motor Car Company of Moorfield, Wolverhampton: Sunbeam cars
- Jonas Woodhead & Sons of Osset, Leeds: automobile springs

in France

- Automobiles Talbot France of Suresnes, Paris: Talbot cars
- Darracq Proprietary Company Limited of North Kensington, London: held those French assets not held by Talbot SA

other investments

- W & G Du Cros of Warple Way Acton, London: W & G commercial vehicles, Yellow Taxi-cabs, charabanc and bus bodies, motorcar bodies and assembly of French-sourced Talbot components for sale in the British market as Darracq-Talbot cars.
- Heenan & Froude of Worcester, constructional engineers

In early 1924, S.T.D. Motors went to the public to borrow funds amounting to around 15 per cent of its fully paid capital. No purpose for the borrowing was published but it is believed to have been to fund Coatalen's ambitions for the group's racing cars. Increased profits did not materialise and within five years the group's financial reserves were exhausted and plant and machinery was becoming obsolete and the group's products were becoming outmoded. After certain undertakings were made to its bankers the company's preference shareholders received their 1925–1926 dividend — in 1929. The financial problems of the 1920s were thought to have been ended by a court-sanctioned financial reconstruction in June 1930. At that time, the substantial accumulated losses were recognised and the ordinary capital chopped down to one-third of its value. Financial commentators could see that the only assets were shares in or loans to other companies making evaluation difficult.

Price Waterhouse & Co was commissioned to report to the board on the financial situation but the board only released a brief summary of Price Waterhouse's recommendations. The report's main criticism was the failure of the board to coordinate the members of the group. Much greater centralisation was recommended as well as standardisation.

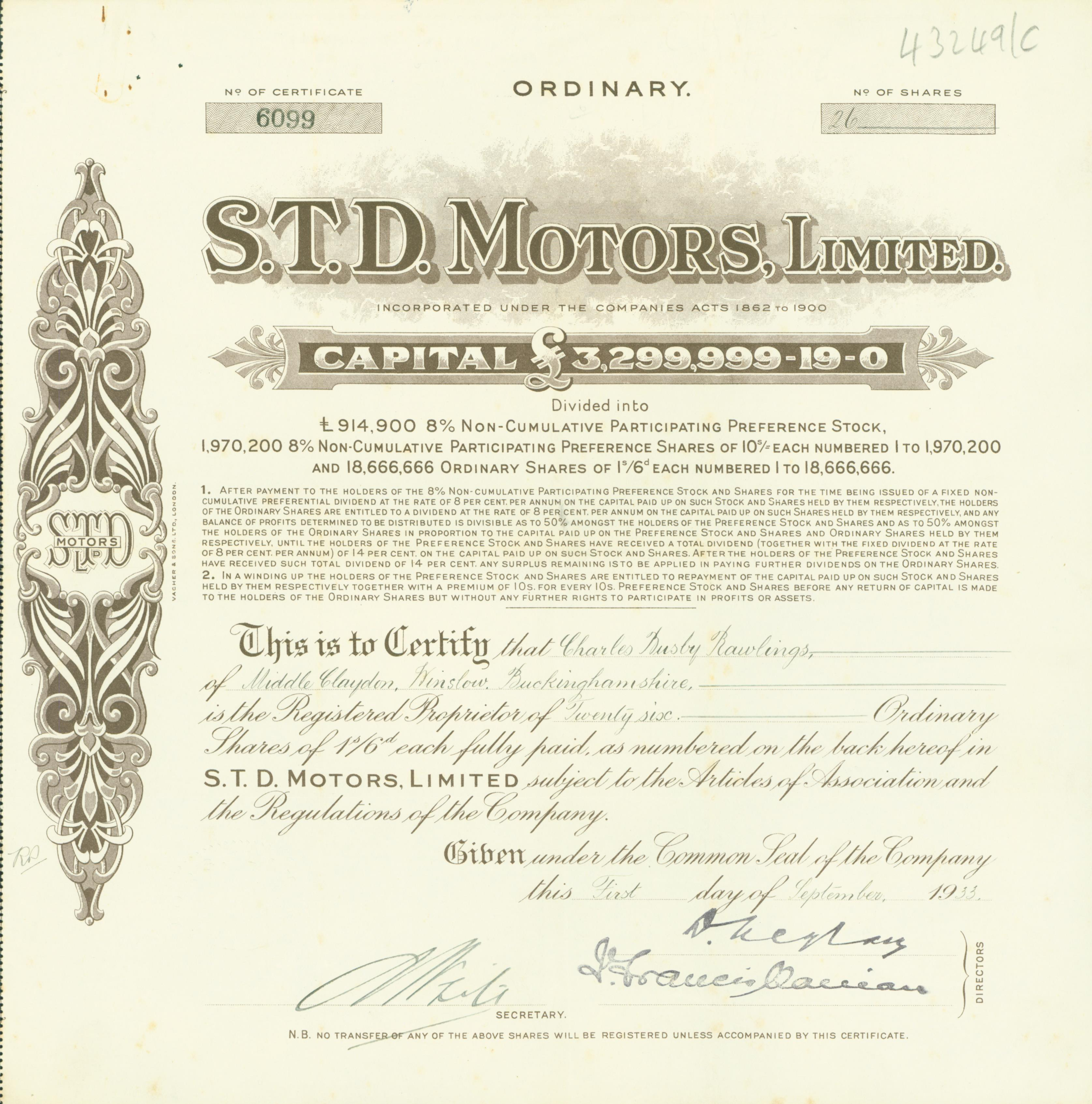
Share of the S.T.D. Motors, issued 1 September 1933

In late March 1931, the suggestion was made by a specially called committee of shareholders that some "new blood" should be introduced to the board of directors. In response the entire S.T.D. Motors' board of directors resigned. An entirely new board was appointed under the chairmanship of General Sir Travers Clarke. The new board immediately set to work to prepare to implement most of the Price Waterhouse recommendations. Its members were: Messrs. Clarke (chair), Marrian, Newcombe, Neylan and Lord Queenborough. (Note: New board 1931: General Sir Travers Clarke (1871–1962) chairman, retired Quartermaster-General to the Forces; Harold Kenzie Newcombe (1884–1949) Canadian banker with wartime rank of Brigadier-General; Sir Daniel Neylan (1869–1943) retired accountant, the War Office; James Henry Robert Francis Marrian (1881–1964) Chartered Accountant, footwear manufacturer; Lord Queenborough (1861–1949) treasurer of the League of Nations, keen supporter of Francisco Franco and Adolf Hitler and father of motoring enthusiast Dorothy Paget; (later) The Earl of Brecknock (1899–1983) assistant to Henry Segrave) This board remained in place until the end of the business. At the end of 1931, the chairman reported a small loss for B Motors but having, for the first time, synchronised reporting for the nine trading subsidiaries no one was quite clear about the year's real profits or losses of the group but they did at least now have a proper grip of the extent of the group's assets and liabliilites. Eighteen months later another capital reduction / scheme of arrangement was announced. The 1924 borrowings fell due for repayment in early 1934. The board was unable to find a way to repay them or replace them with a new loan. The situation was without hope and negotiations began for a sale of the constituent businesses for cash to repay loans. They were not successful. In October 1934 S.T.D. again asked its lenders for more time to find cash to pay interest.

=== Disintegration of S.T.D. Motors ===
In mid-October 1934, two days after the S.T.D. Motors board had appealed to its lenders and just before the opening of the October 1934 Motor Show at Olympia London, "Crisp and Another" (trustees of the lenders' trust deed) applied to the High Court, Chancery Division, for the appointment of receivers to the Sunbeam Motor Car Company and Clément-Talbot. In the end, profit-making Clément-Talbot was saved the ignominy of receivership and S.T.D. was able to sell it as and when the directors chose.

William Lyons was finishing his SS 100 sports car and let it be known that he believed he had a binding agreement with S.T.D. Motors to purchase Sunbeam's name and trademarks, thus upgrading his very moderately priced new car. (Note: Lyons new SS100 Jaguar was priced at £395. At this time a Talbot 105 was over £600 and a Speed Twenty Alvis was listed at £850. page 87 Richard Hough, A History of the World's Sports Cars. George Allen & Unwin, London 1961) In January, unbeknownst to Lyons, a provisional agreement was made with Rootes Securities, and from that time the Rootes Group controlled Clément-Talbot and Darracq Motor Engineering Company, though Rootes would have to wait for the end of the legal proceedings to collect Sunbeam from its receivership.

Rootes announced In the summer of 1935 it had at last bought Sunbeam and its subsidiary Sunbeam Commercial Vehicles from the receiver.

The former Talbot business in France had long been committed under an option to the manager of the Suresnes plant, Antonio Lago. After its S.T.D. commitments were clarified (completed with the sale of Sunbeam), and SA Talbot's commitments to its French bankers were cleared (after lengthy negotiation), Lago acquired the business, creating Talbot-Lago.

== Production models ==
- Darracq 20 CV Double Phaeton
- Darracq 20 CV Double Side entrance
- Darracq 20/32 CV Double Phaeton
- Darracq 40/60 CV
- Darracq 30/40 CV

== In popular culture ==
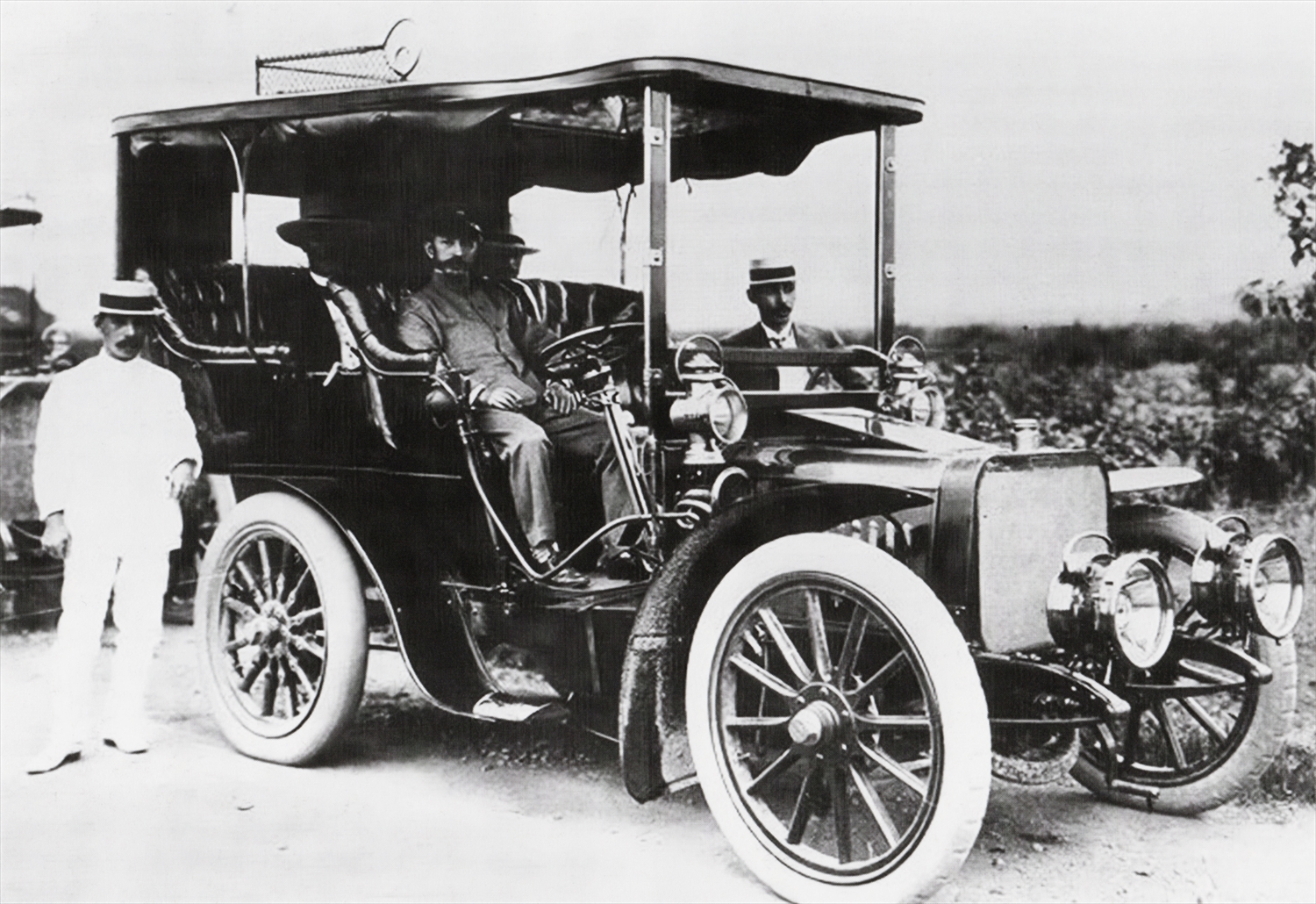
Prince Arisugawa's 1905 Darracq

A Darracq 20 CV was one of the first cars imported to Japan, purchased by Prince Arisugawa Takehito, who brought it back following a European tour in 1905. Not only would Arisugawa be the first member of the royal family to drive a car himself, the Darracq would be the first vehicle the future Emperor Taisho would ride in. Arisugawa also convinced Uchiyama Komanosuke to build the first domestically produced Japanese automobile, using his Darracq as a template.

The main vintage motorcar featured in the 1953 British film Genevieve is a Darracq, of the two-cylinder 10/12 hp type, built in Suresnes, France, in 1904 by the British Darracq & Company operation there.

In the 100th episode of Wheeler Dealers, Mike Brewer and Edd China restore a 1903 Darracq, borrowed from the Haynes International Motor Museum, to working order and drove it in the veteran car run from London to Brighton. This project was inspired by the movie.

== Footnotes ==
=== Other sources ===
- Northey, Tom, "Land-speed record: The Fastest Men on Earth", in Northey, Tom, ed. World of Automobiles (London: Orbis, 1974), Volume 10, pp. 1161–1166. London: Orbis, 1974.
- Setright, L.J.K. "Opel: Simple Engineering and Commercial Courage", in Northey, Tom, ed. World of Automobiles, Volume 14, pp. 1583–1592. London: Orbis, 1974.
- Wise, David Burgess. "Darracq: A Motor Enthusiast who Hated Driving", in Northey, Tom, ed. World of Automobiles, Volume 5, pp. 493–494. London: Orbis, 1974.
- Wise, David Burgess. "Vanderbilt Cup: The American Marathon", in Northey, Tom, ed. World of Automobiles, Volume 21, pp. 2458–60-4. London: Orbis, 1974.
