= Automobiles Talbot France =

French automobile manufacturer

Automobiles Talbot S.A.
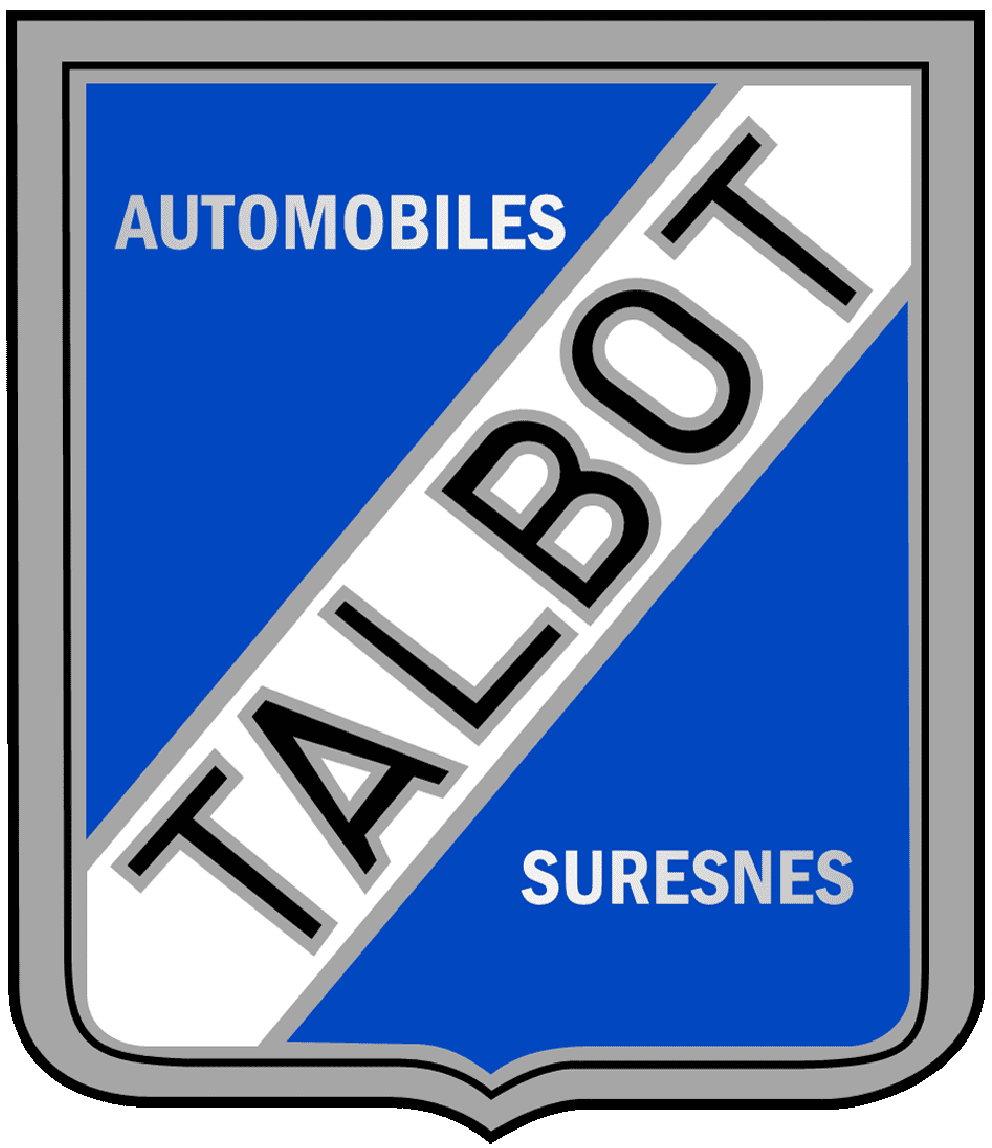
- Formerly: Automobiles Darracq S.A.
- Type: Subsidiary
- Industry: Automotive
- Predecessor: Automobiles Darracq France
- Founded: 1916
- Founder: A Darracq London
- Defunct: 1936; 90 years ago
- Successor: Talbot-Lago
- Headquarters: Suresnes, France
- Key people: Antonio Lago, Director
- Products: Automobiles
- Brands: Talbot
- Parent: Darracq London (1916–20); S.T.D. Motors Ltd. (1920–36)

Automobiles Talbot France was the French subsidiary of British automotive manufacturer S.T.D. Motors Ltd., established in 1920 after the merger of British automakers A Darracq and Company, Clément-Talbot, and Sunbeam Company. Automobiles Talbot manufactured cars in Suresnes, near Paris.

Roots to the company can be traced to the French enterprise Automobiles Darracq S.A., founded by Alexandre Darracq in February 1897. In 1902 he sold it into British control. The (now subsidiary) company was formed in 1916 by London A Darracq and Company Ltd.

When the parent company having bought London's Clément-Talbot became S.T.D. Motors Limited in 1920 this Suresnes business was renamed "Automobiles Talbot" and after a transition period the Suresnes products were branded just "Talbot".

Antonio Lago, the managing director at Suresnes, acquired control of the Suresnes business when S.T.D. Motors Limited, after its financial collapse, was liquidated in 1936. After acquiring rights to the Talbot brand, Lago established his own company, Talbot-Lago.

== History ==
=== Background ===
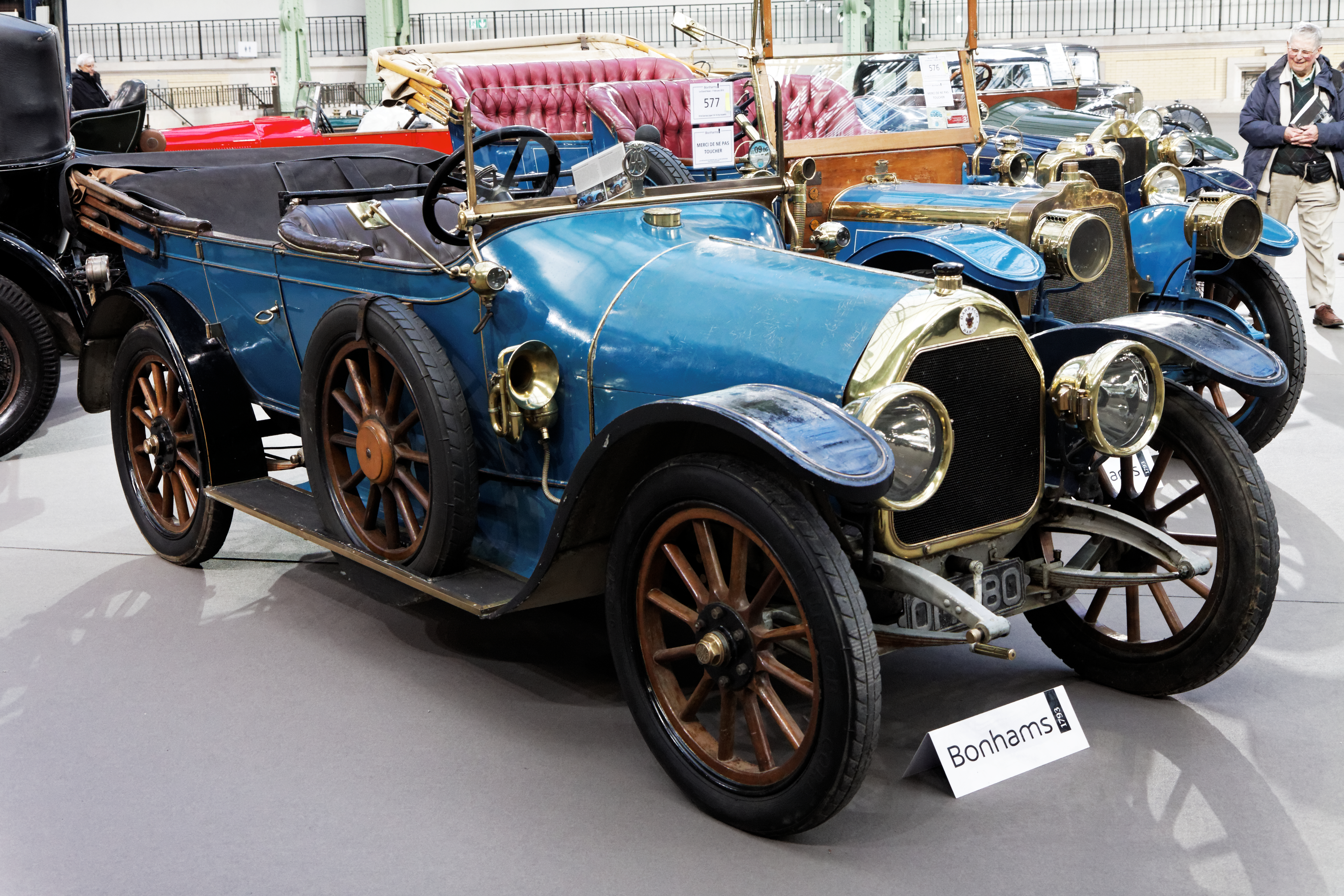
Clegg's 16 horsepower type V14

During 1916 the Suresnes assets, the whole French business, were transferred to Société Anonyme Automobiles Darracq, a new company incorporated in France for the purpose. British assets were transferred to a British company named Darracq Motor Engineering Company Limited. A Darracq and Company (1905) Limited was now no more than a holder of shares in these two businesses.

After the War automobile production resumed as soon as the Suresnes factory had ceased making munitions, arms and planes. By the time of the Paris Motor Show in October 1919 the prewar 16HP "Type V14" had returned to production, featuring a four-cylinder 2,940cc engine. But the manufacturer's big news at the Paris show was the 24HP "Type A", powered by a V8 4,584cc unit. This model had also been initiated by Managing Director Owen Clegg back in 1913, but production had been delayed by intervening events till 1919. The "Type A" featured four forward speeds and, from 1920, four-wheel brakes. Despite these innovative features, it did not sell well.

The French franc had suffered a sustained crisis of its own during the war years, and in May 1920 the "Type V" was listed at 35,000 francs in bare chassis form: a torpedo bodied car was priced at 40,000 francs. Even the "Type V", with its 3,150 mm (124 in) wheelbase, was substantial car, but for customers wanting more, a "Type A" appeared on the same list at 39,500 francs in bare chassis form, and 44,500 francs for a torpedo bodied car.

The prewar 16HP also reappeared after the war and was the manufacturer's top-selling car in Britain.

=== Automobiles Talbot formation ===
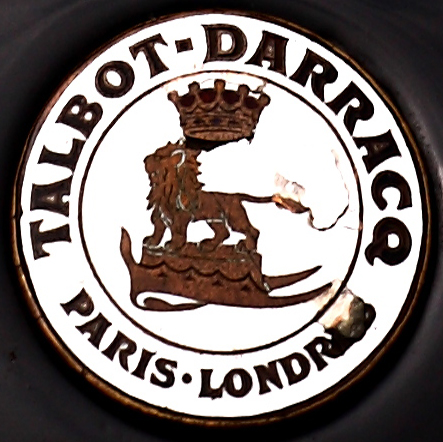
Logo of the "Talbot-Darracq" car brand

Following the inclusion of Clément-Talbot in the S.T.D. group, Suresnes products were branded "Talbot-Darracq" but the word Darracq was dropped in 1922. Cars made by Automobiles Talbot imported from France to England were renamed Darracq to avoid confusion with the English Clément-Talbot products.

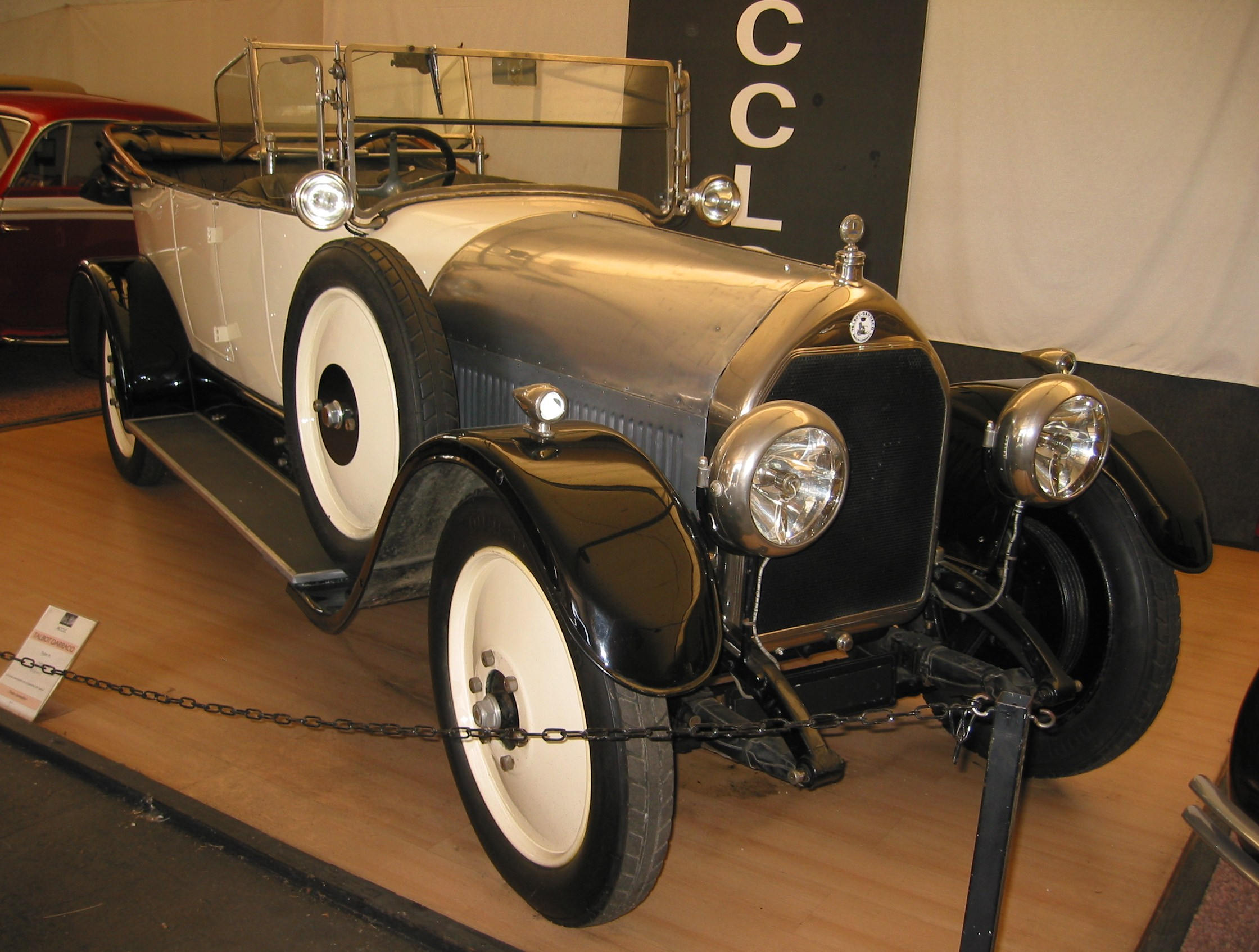
1920 Talbot Darracq Type A 4.6 litre V8

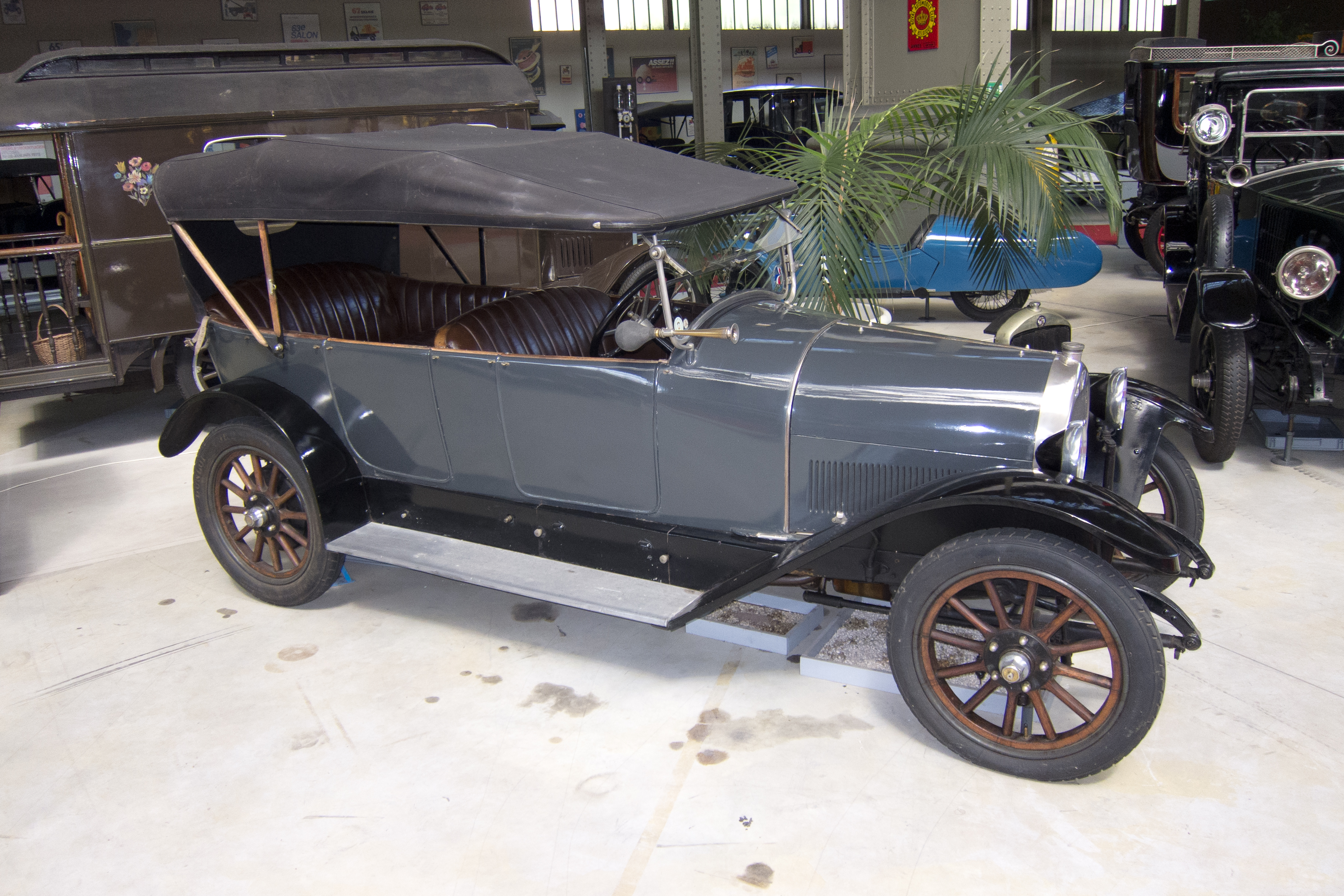
1927 DUS torpédo

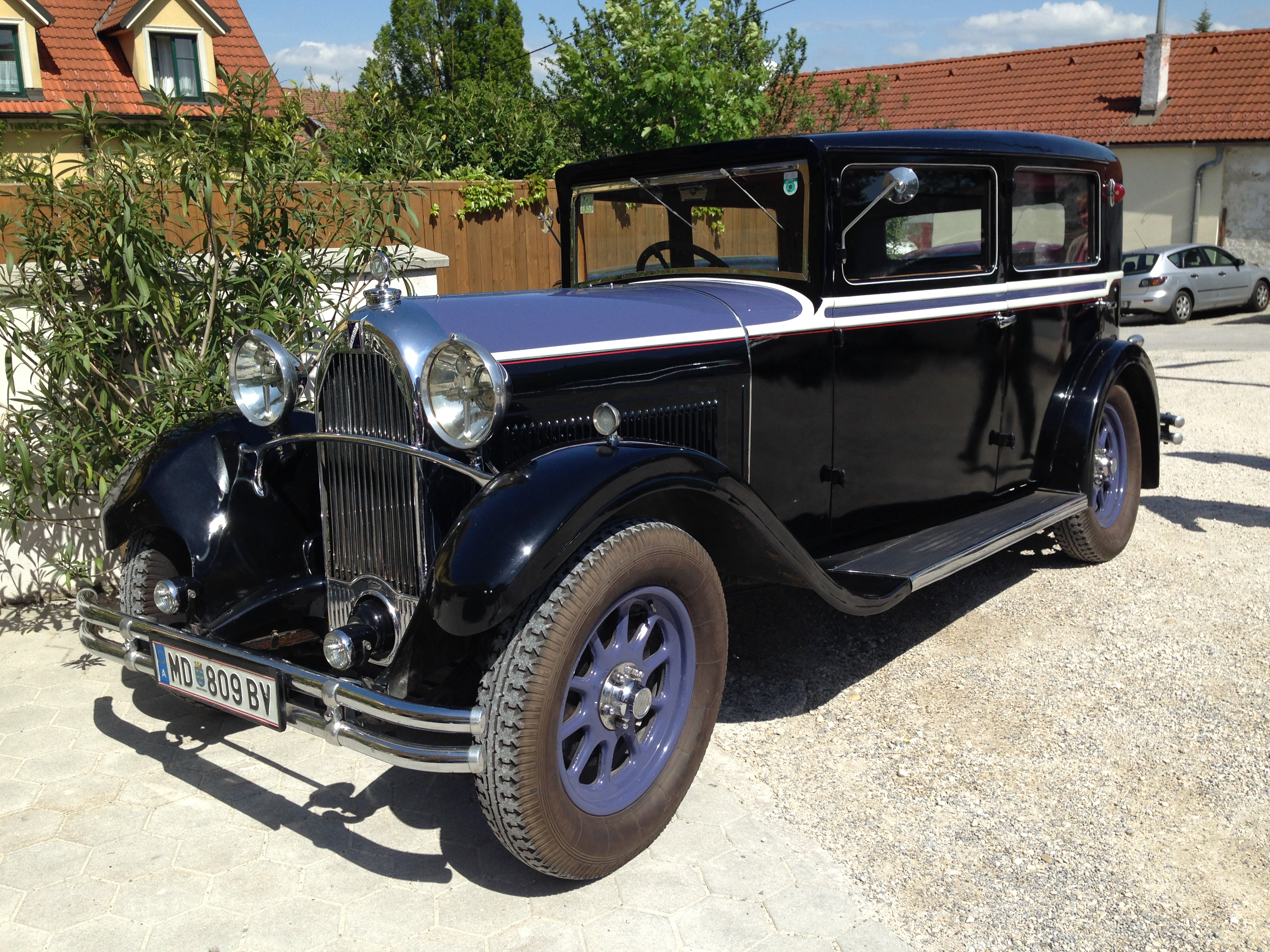
c. 1930 M67 berline

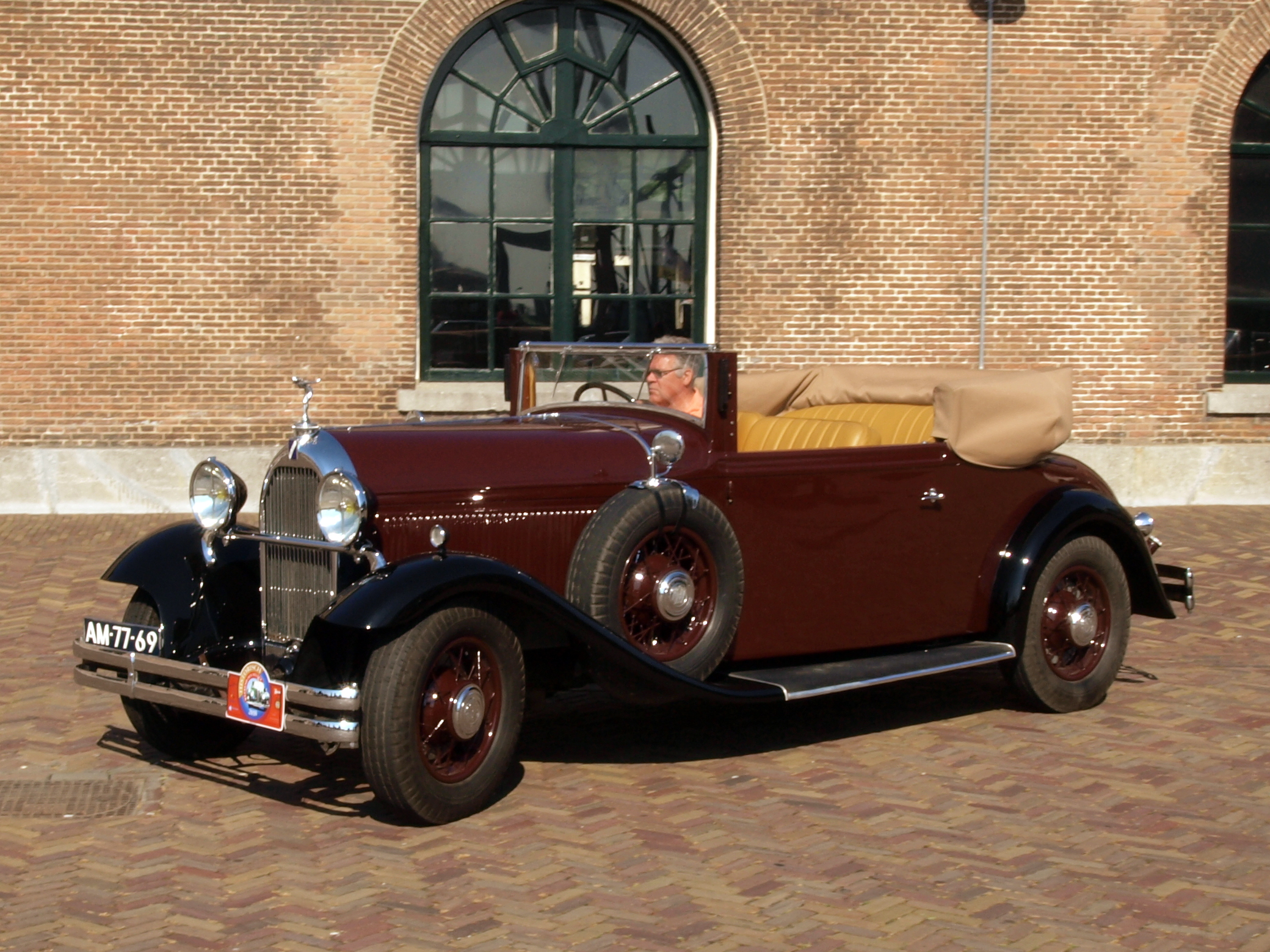
1931 M75 cabriolet

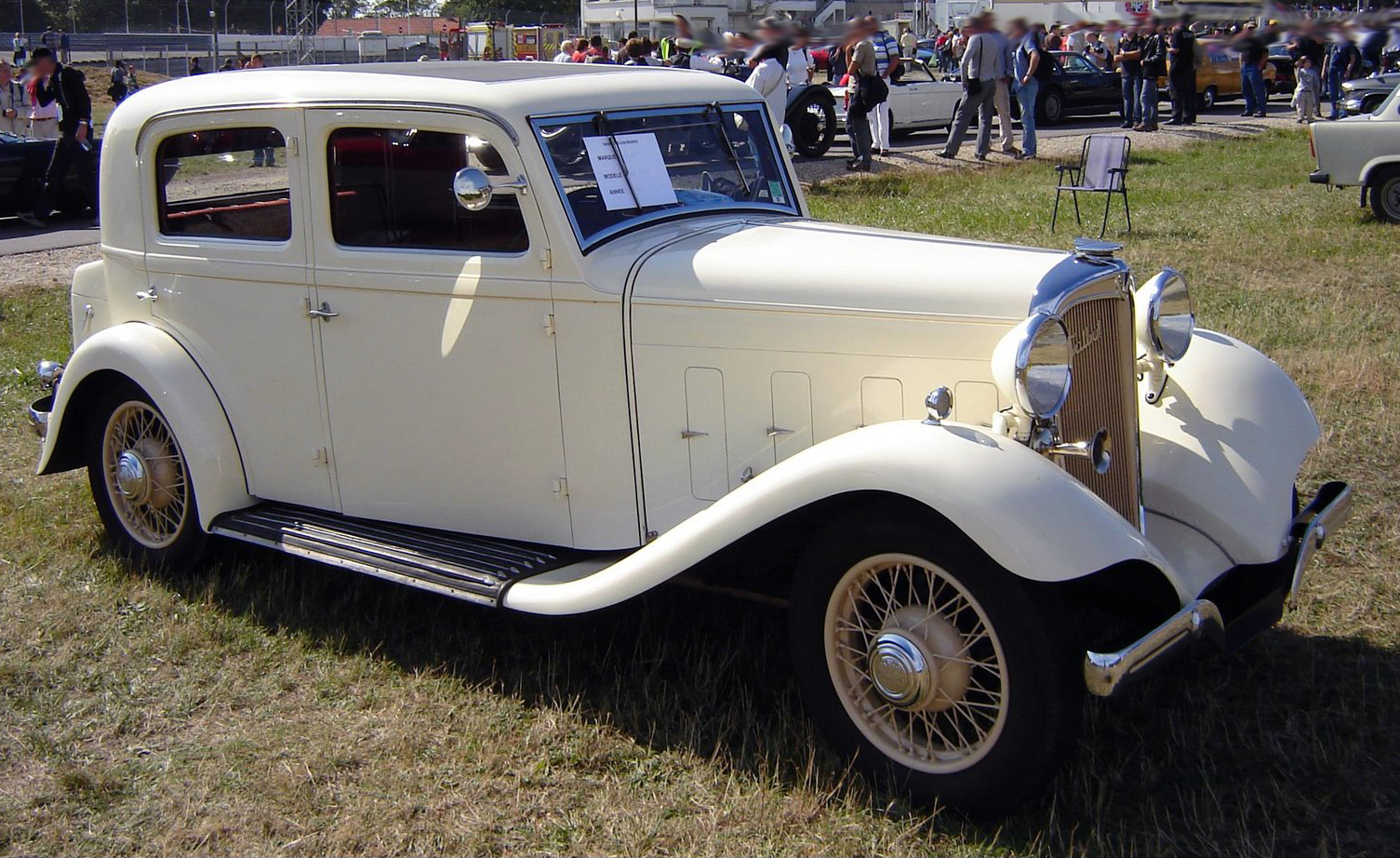
1934 L67 berline

== Successor: Talbot-Lago ==
In early 1934 S.T.D. Motors granted the managing director of Automobiles Talbot SA an option later extended twelve months to 10 June 1935 to acquire all S.T.D.'s interest in the French business in consideration of the release of S.T.D. from its guarantee of the French company. The value of the guarantee was put at about £98,500. After "long and intricate negotiations" with the French company's bankers the managing director, Antonio Lago, duly exercised his option in 1936 and went on to produce luxury cars badged Talbot and racing cars badged Talbot-Lago until long after the second World War.

He brought out a full range of new Talbots and simultaneously embarked on what turned out to be a very successful racing programme. By the time of the German Occupation the Talbot factory was fully tooled up to make Pratt & Whitney aero engines. Headed by an Italian national, his British citizenship ignored, Lago's business did not suffer the disturbances of other motor manufacturers.

"To avoid confusion cars exported to certain countries by Automobiles Talbot S.A. are now known as Lago."

The postwar range contained two and four-door saloons a drophead coupé and a fixed head coupé. As usual bare chassis were available. Darracq had become a famous name in motor-racing and the new S.T.D. Motors combine cars bore a Talbot-Darracq badge.

=== Formula One ===
The 4.5-litre, six-cylinder Talbot-Lago T26 was eligible for F1 competition post-war, and many examples, both factory and private, appeared in the first two years of the F1 World Championship, 1950 and 1951. Talbots came fourth and fifth in the inaugural World Championship race, the 1950 British Grand Prix, piloted by Yves Giraud-Cabantous and Louis Rosier respectively. The move to two-litre F2 regulations for 1952 effectively ended Talbot's F1 spell as a manufacturer.

=== Gallery ===
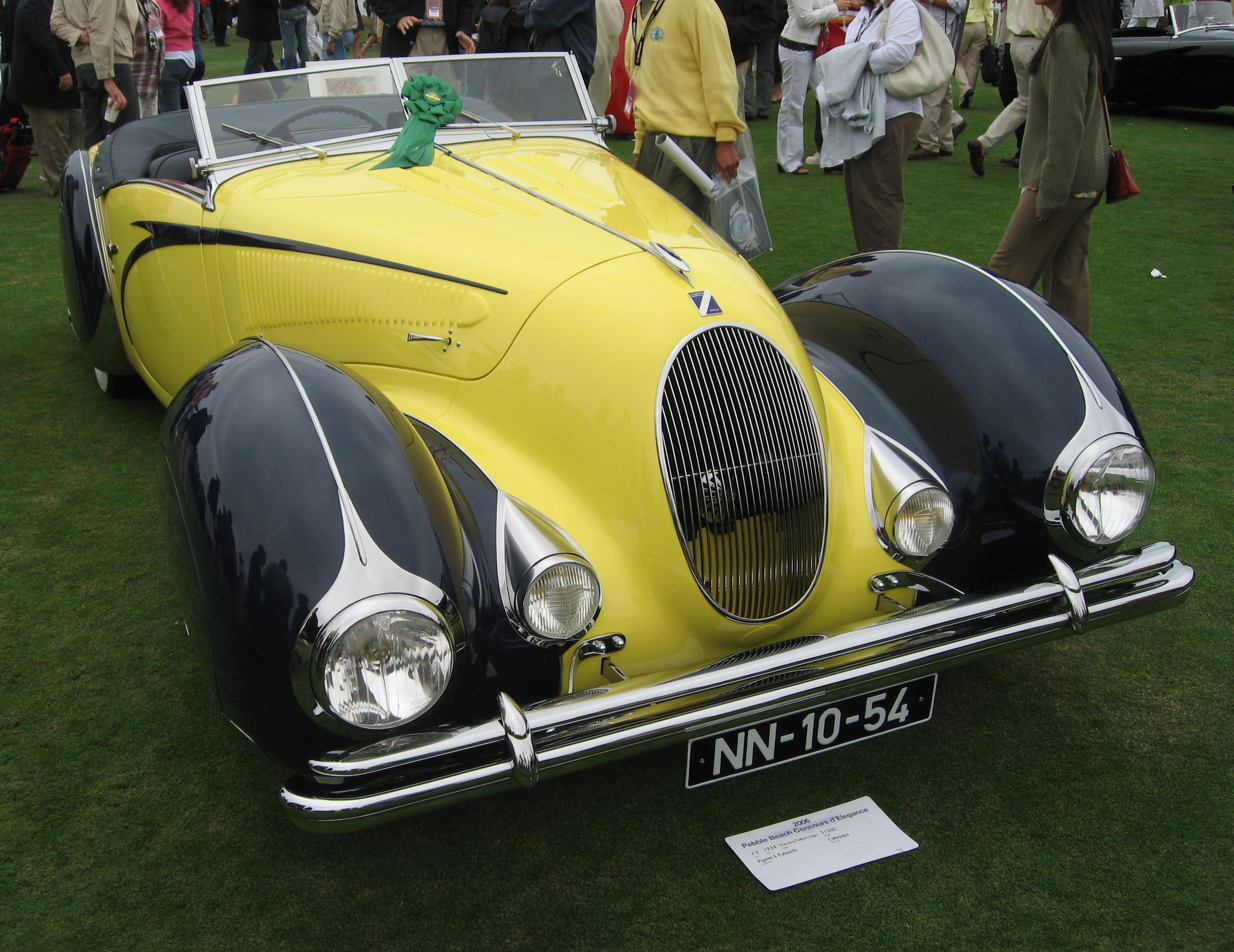
1938 Talbot T150C open two-seater by Figoni & Falaschi

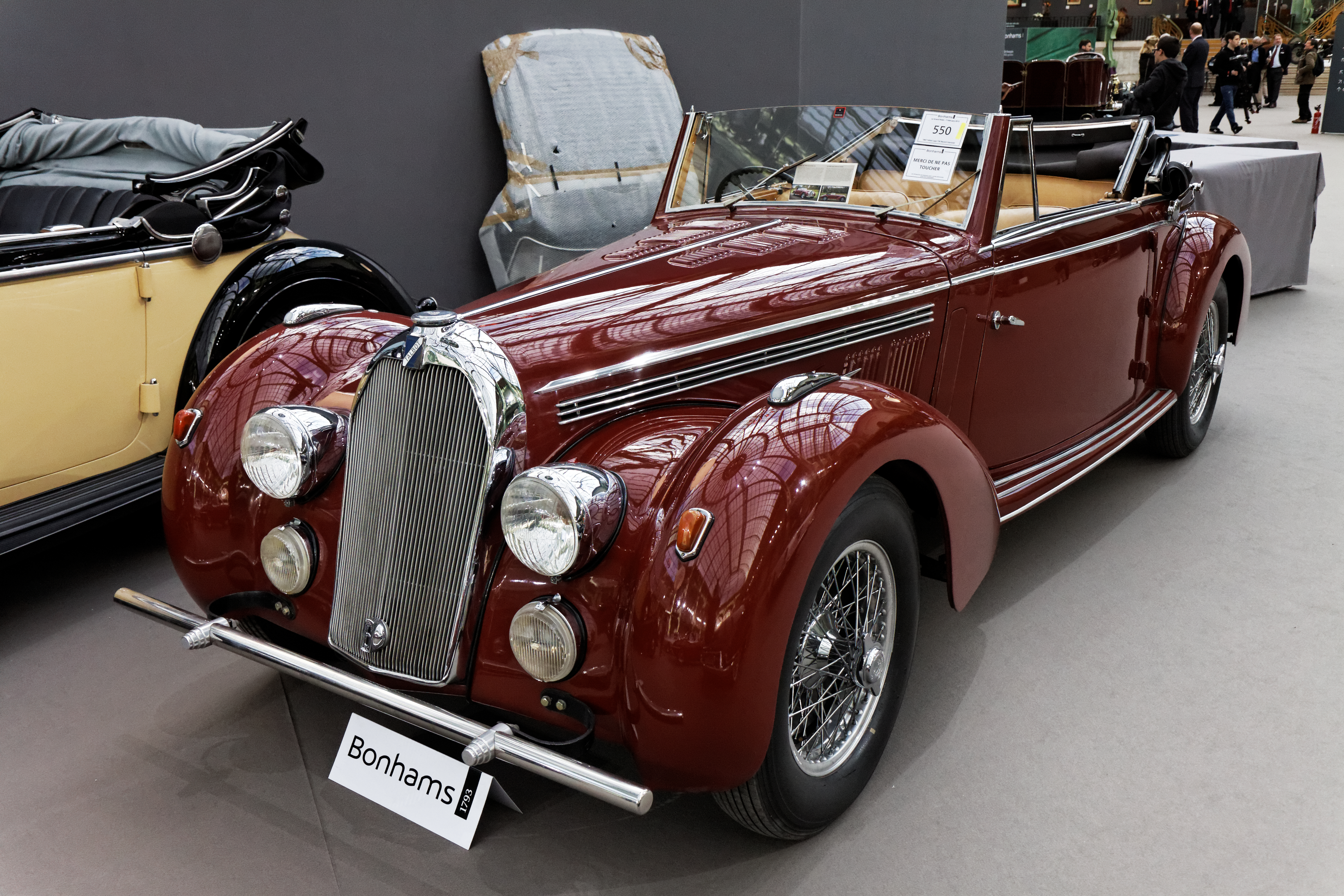
1947 Talbot T26 Record cabriolet

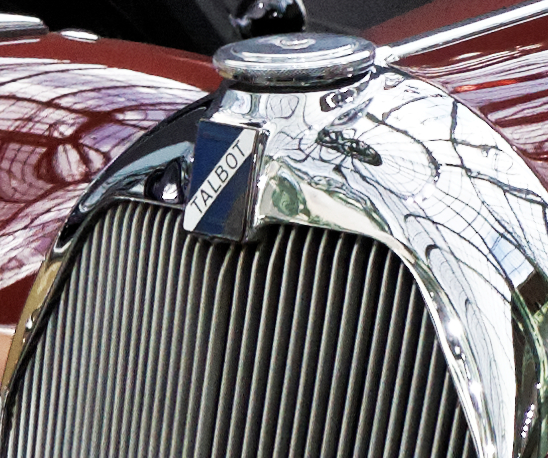
Talbot Lago T26 record cabriolet (rear detail)

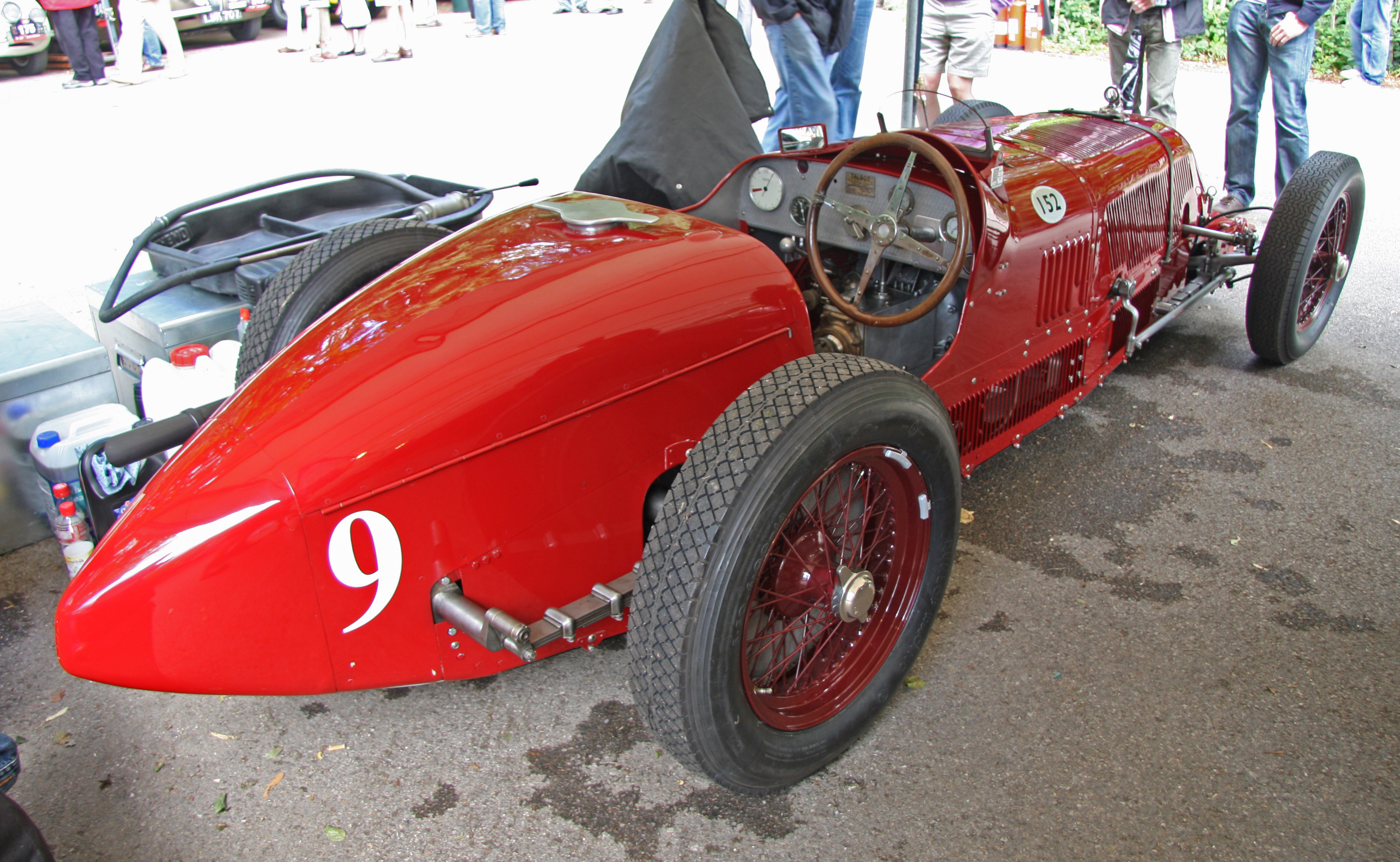
1927 Talbot-Darracq Grand Prix car

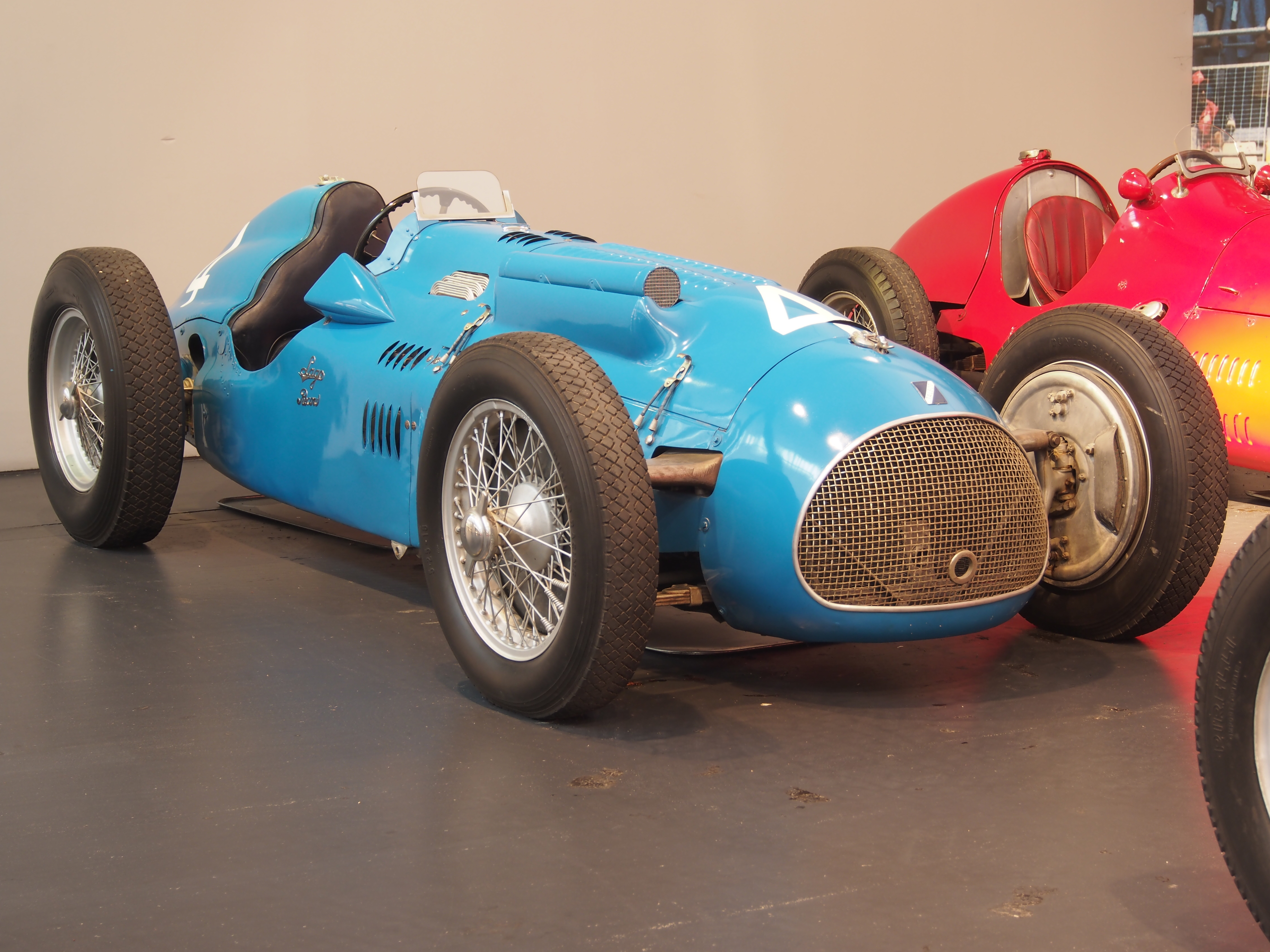
1949 Talbot-Lago T-26C Racing Monoplace

== Notes ==
=== Other sources ===
- Northey, Tom, "Land-speed record: The Fastest Men on Earth", in Northey, Tom, ed. World of Automobiles (London: Orbis, 1974), Volume 10, pp. 1161–1166. London: Orbis, 1974.
- Setright, L.J.K. "Opel: Simple Engineering and Commercial Courage", in Northey, Tom, ed. World of Automobiles, Volume 14, pp. 1583–1592. London: Orbis, 1974.
- Wise, David Burgess."Darracq: A Motor Enthusiast who Hated Driving", in Northey, Tom, ed. World of Automobiles, Volume 5, pp. 493–494. London: Orbis, 1974.
- Wise, David Burgess."Vanderbilt Cup: The American Marathon", in Northey, Tom, ed. World of Automobiles, Volume 21, pp. 2458–60-4. London: Orbis, 1974.
