= Darracq Motor Engineering Company =

British vehicle importer and wholesaler

Darracq Motor Engineering Company Limited
- Industry: Automotive
- Founded: 1 May 1916; 109 years ago in London, UK
- Founders: A Darracq and Company (1905) Limited
- Fate: Liquidated and dissolved after 1935
- Headquarters: London, United Kingdom
- Areas served: United Kingdom and British Empire except Canada
- Products: Motor bodies, motor importer
- Owners: A Darracq and Company (1905) Limited
- Parent: A Darracq and Company (1905) Limited

Darracq Motor Engineering Company Limited was a London importer, retailer and wholesaler of French-made Darracq and Talbot automobiles, a coachbuilder making regular production runs of bodies for S T D group products and a property holding company on behalf of its parent S T D Motors Limited.

In 1935 its assets were sold following the financial collapse of S T D Motors in 1934. The coachbuilding business was bought by the Rootes brothers and lost its separate identity.

== Purpose ==
In 1916 the board of A Darracq and Company (1905) Limited (later S T D Motors) elected to rearrange ownership of its Suresnes, Paris plant and the Darracq distribution system in London. Darracq Motor Engineering was incorporated (Note: New Companies: Darracq Motor Engineering Company Limited. Reg. Office: Townmead Works, Townmead Road, Fulham, London S.W.; manufacturers of automobiles, aeroplanes, motor cars, motor and other cycles, mechanical and general engineers, etc. Private Company Mechanical Power, vol 11, 1916. page 11, 6 April 1916) to take over their assets located in Britain: 150 Bond Street showrooms, warehouses, service garages etc., including their Fulham, London Works, at that time making munitions, aircraft and components such as propellers and under the wartime control of the Royal Aircraft Factory.

After incorporation Darracq Motor Engineering Company added to its British assets ownership of the Darracq land in France on which their Suresnes plant was situated. Darracq Motor Engineering then leased it to a new French company, Société Anonyme Darracq, incorporated to hold all the other French assets formerly held directly by A Darracq and Company (1905) Limited.

A Darracq and Company (1905) (soon to be renamed S T D Motors) was then reduced to a non-trading company holding ownership of the various French and British businesses.

== Activities ==
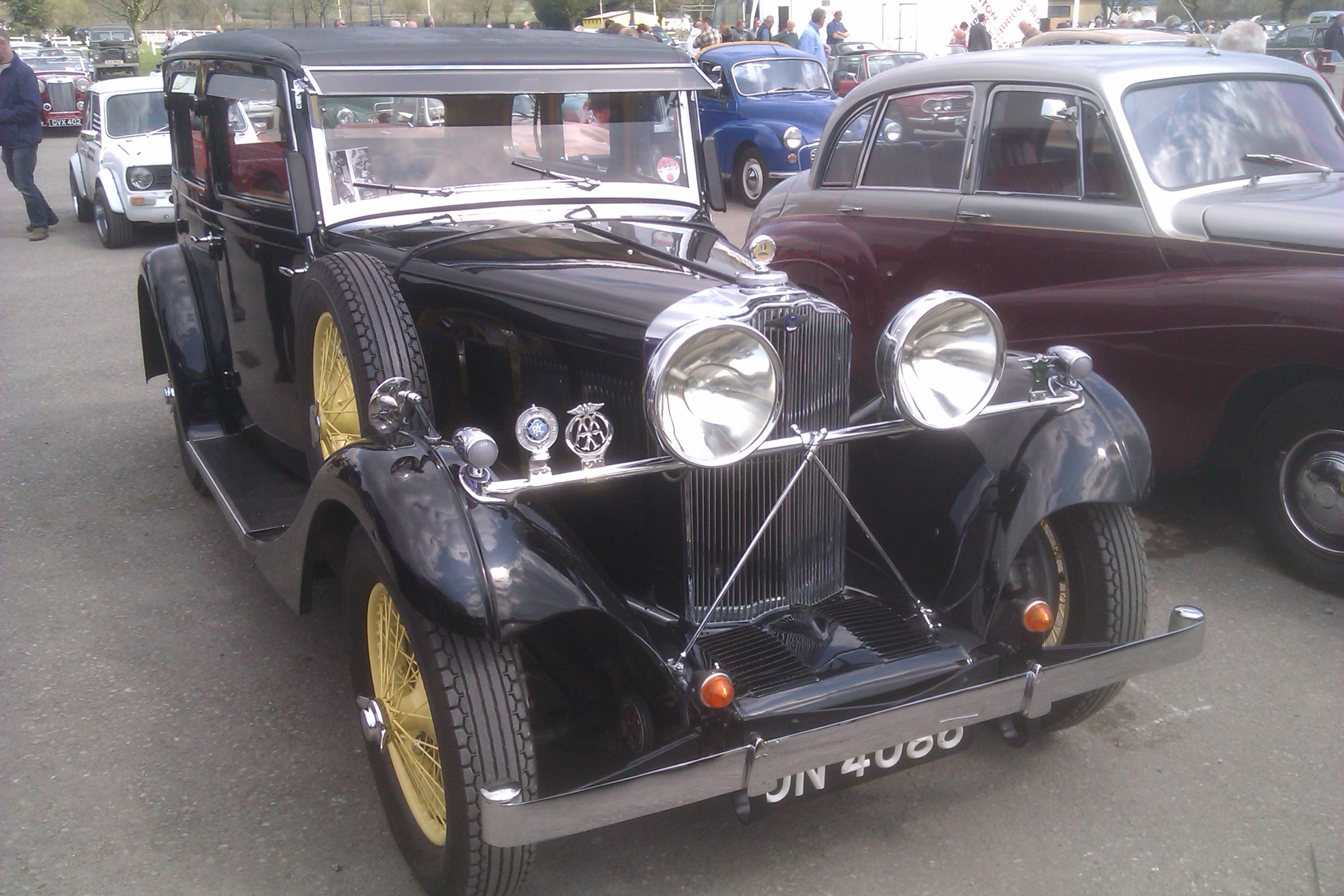
1934 Talbot AX65, body by Darracq

After the 1918 Armistice the Fulham Works once again made motor car bodies for Darracqs and continued to assemble French-sourced components.

After 1920 offices and showrooms in The Vale, Acton at the intersection with Warple Way were shared with W & G Du Cros another group member.

In the expanded combine Darracq Motor Engineering also made bodies for Sunbeam of Wolverhampton and Talbot London. In spite of the manufacturer's name change Darracq Motor Engineering continued to import and sell SA Talbot cars sent from France for sale in Britain and brand them Darracq.

== Rootes ==
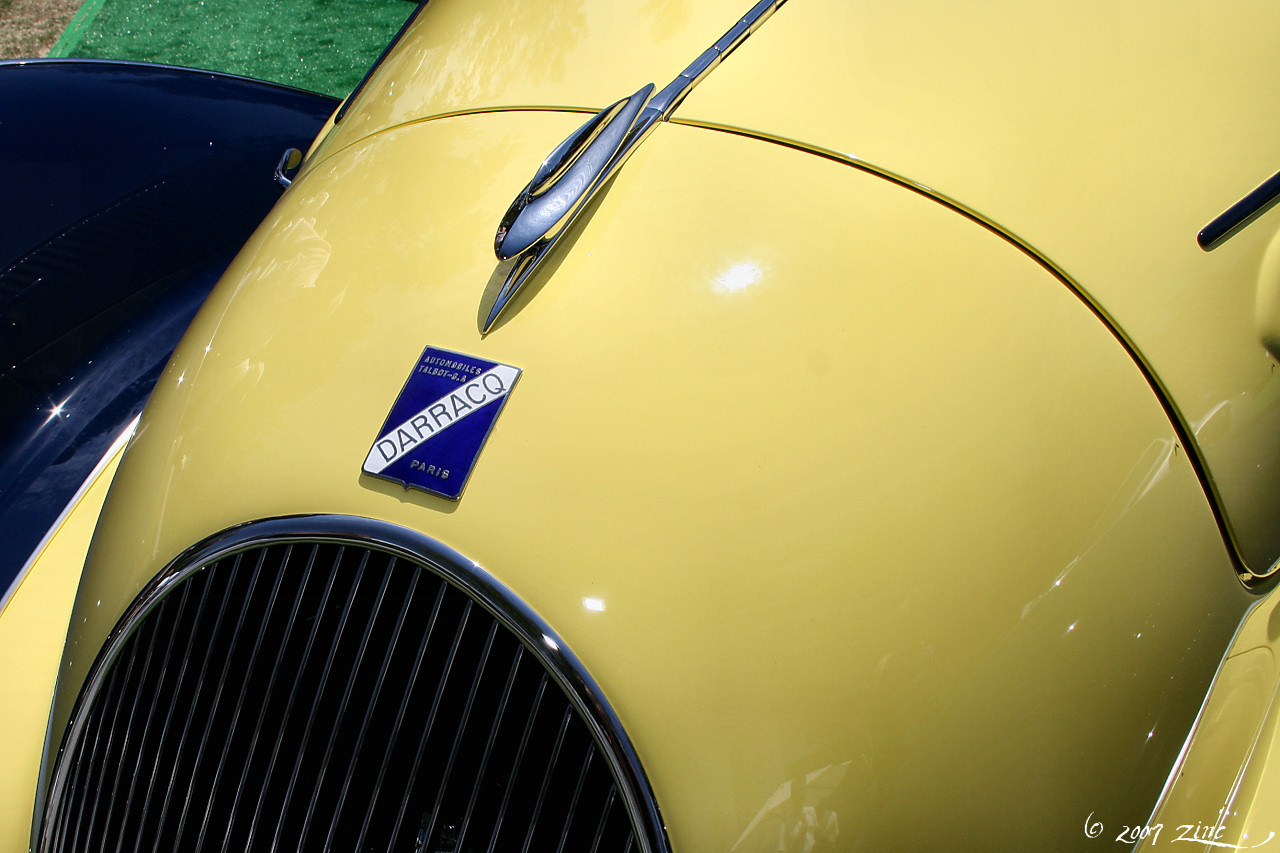
1938 Darracq by Figoni et Falaschi

The Rootes brothers folded the coachbuilding portion of this business into Clément-Talbot's In January 1935 and it lost its separate identity.

New cars remained available (and service and spares) from D.A.R.A. Co Limited at 1a Kilburn High Road, Maida Vale NW6. Rebadging of SA Talbot cars sent from Suresnes to Britain continued after the dissolution of Darracq Motor Engineering because Clément-Talbot's British business remained active. In 1938 Clément-Talbot's name was changed to Sunbeam-Talbot. After twenty years its products dropped Talbot from their badges in 1954.

=== Cars manufactured in Suresnes, Paris (1919–1938) ===
at first badged Talbot Darracq and later Darracq for sale in Britain

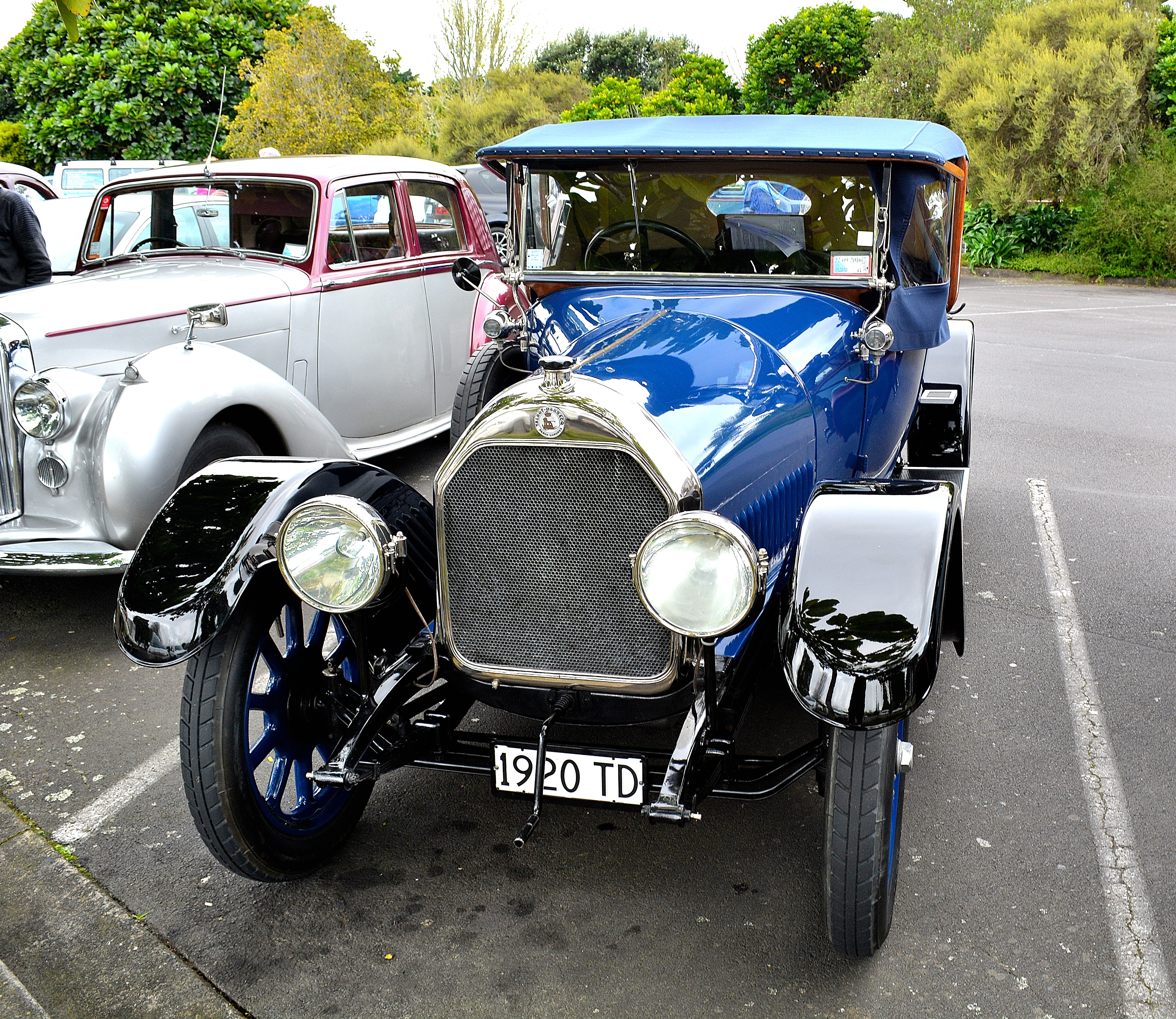
1920 Talbot-Darracq 4.6-litre 20hp V8 drophead coupé built in France and branded Talbot-Darracq for distribution from London as well as retailing by Darracq Motor Engineering Company

Information assembled from The Autocar Buyer's Guide and published in Appendix V, Ian Nickols and Kent Karslake, Motoring Entente, Cassell, London 1956

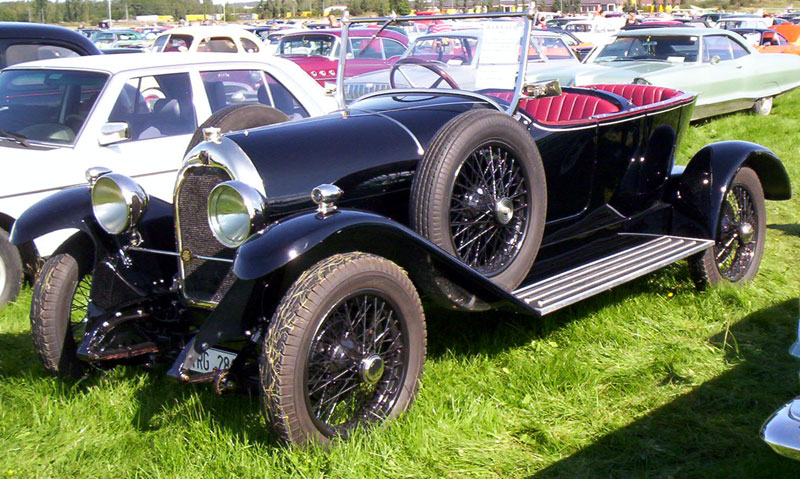
1924 Darracq 12/32 Sport Cloverleaf in Sweden

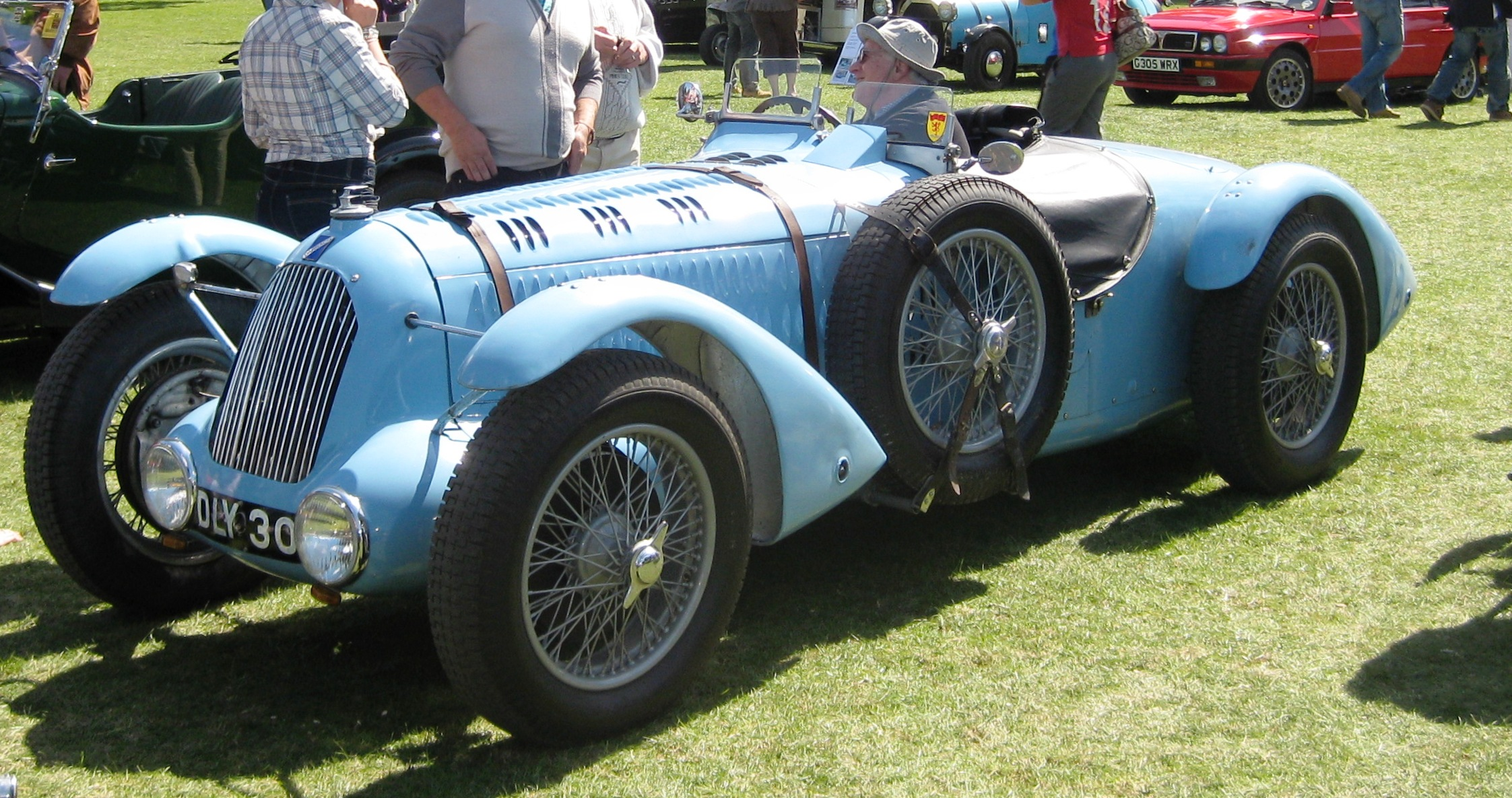
1936 Talbot Darracq T150C

years	name (French)	disp	cyl's	bore / stroke	RAC tax hp	bhp	gear box	wheelbase	track
1920–1921	20 (A)	4594	V8	75 x 130	27.9	—	4	138 in (3,505 mm)	53 in (1,346 mm)
1920, 1922	16 (V14)	2938	4	85 x 130	17.9	—	4	129 in (3,277 mm)	51 in (1,295 mm)
1921	14	2297	4	75 x 130	14	—	4	129 in (3,277 mm)	51 in (1,295 mm)
1922	8	970	4	57 x 95	8	—	3	96 in (2,438 mm)	47 in (1,194 mm)
1922	12	1460	4	65 x 110	10.5	—	3	118 in (2,997 mm)	49 in (1,245 mm)
1922	27.9 (A)	4594	V8	75 x 130	27.9	—	4	138 in (3,505 mm)	53 in (1,346 mm)
1923	8/18	970	4	57 x 95	8	—	3	97 in (2,464 mm)	47 in (1,194 mm)
1923	12/32 (DC)	1598	4	68 x 110	11.5	—	3	118 in (2,997 mm)	49 in (1,245 mm)
1923	18/36	2938	4	85 x 130	17.9	—	4	129 in (3,277 mm)	51 in (1,295 mm)
1923	20/40	3230	4	89 x 130	19.6	—	4	129 in (3,277 mm)	51 in (1,295 mm)
1923	28/70	4594	V8	75 x 130	27.9	—	4	138 in (3,505 mm)	53 in (1,346 mm)
1924	15/40 (DS)	2121	4	75 x 120	14	—	3	126 in (3,200 mm)	53 in (1,346 mm)
1924–1926	12/32 (DC)	1598	4	68 x 110	11.5	—	3	118 in (2,997 mm)	53 in (1,346 mm)
1926–1927	15/40	2294	4	78 x 120	15.9	—	3	118 in (2,997 mm)	53 in (1,346 mm)
1926–1927	17/75	2540	6	70 x110	18.2	—	3 / 4	132 in (3,353 mm)	55 in (1,397 mm)
1927–1928	12/40	1669	4	69.5 x 110	12	—	4	123 in (3,124 mm)	53 in (1,346 mm)
1927–1928	20/98	2916	6	75 x 110	20.9	—	4	131 in (3,327 mm)	55 in (1,397 mm)
1928	16 (M67)	1999	4	67 x 94.5	16.7	—	4	127 in (3,226 mm)	54 in (1,372 mm)
1929–1930	16 (M67)	1999	4	67 x 94.5	16.7	—	4	127 in (3,226 mm)	55 in (1,397 mm)
1929–1930	20 (K74)	2440	6	74 x 94.5	20.4	—	4	127 in (3,226 mm)	55 in (1,397 mm)
1929–1930	20 (T)	2916	6	75 x 110	20.9	—	4	136.5 in (3,467 mm)	55 in (1,397 mm)
1930	30	3823	St8	78 x 100	30.2	—	4	143 in (3,632 mm)	55 in (1,397 mm)
1931	20.9	2504	6	75 x 94.5	20.9	—	4	124 in (3,150 mm)	57 in (1,448 mm)
1931	22.6	2866	6	78 x 100	22.6	—	4	134 in (3,404 mm)	57 in (1,448 mm)
1931–1933	30.1	3823	St8	78 x 100	30.2	—	4	139 in (3,531 mm)	57 in (1,448 mm)
1932	16 (M67)	1999	4	67 x 94.5	16.7	—	4	126 in (3,200 mm)	57 in (1,448 mm)
1932	20	2504	6	75 x 94.5	20.9	—	4	126 in (3,200 mm)	57 in (1,448 mm)
1932	22	2866	6	78 x 100	22.6	—	4	126 in (3,200 mm)	57 in (1,448 mm)
1932-1933	30	3823	St8	78 x 100	30.2	—	4	143 in (3,632 mm)	57 in (1,448 mm)
1933	16 (M67)	1999	4	67 x 94.5	16.7	—	4	117 in (2,972 mm)	55 in (1,397 mm)
1933-1934	20	2504	6	75 x 94.5	20.9	—	4	117 in (2,972 mm)	57 in (1,448 mm)
1934	16 (L67)	1999	4	67 x 94.5	16.7	—	4	117 in (2,972 mm)	57 in (1,448 mm)
1934	28	3563	8	75 x 100	27.9	—	4	124 in (3,150 mm) / 138 in (3,505 mm)	57 in (1,448 mm)
1936–1936	16.7	1999	6	67 x 94.5	16.7	—	4	127 in (3,226 mm)	55 in (1,397 mm)
