= Millet motorcycle =

Millet motorized bicycle
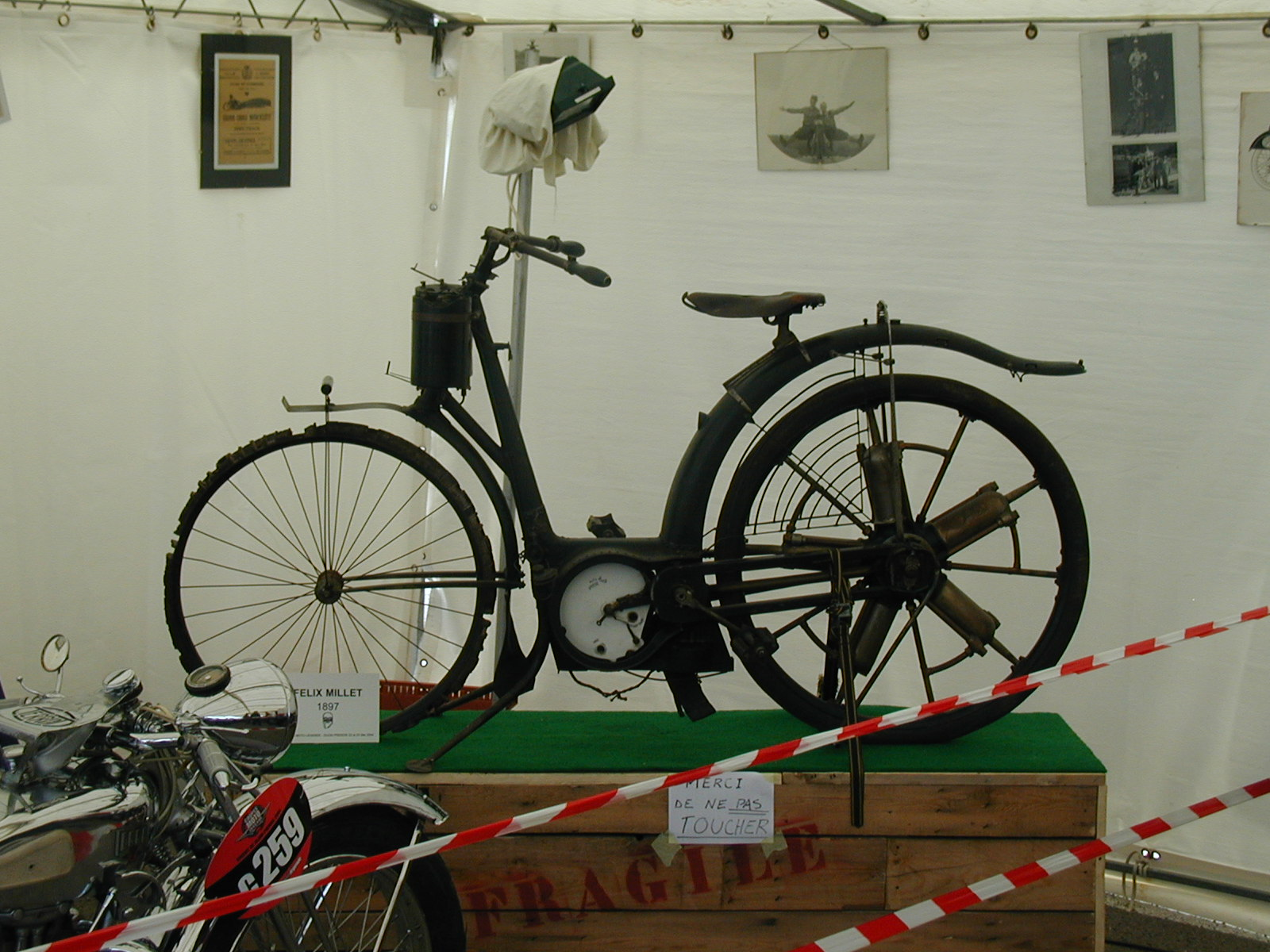
- Unrestored Millet, titled 1897 model
- Manufacturer: Alexandre Darracq
- Production: ca. 1894–1895
- Engine: 500 cubic centimetres (31 cu in; 0.50 L) 5-cylinder air-cooled radial-configuration rotary engine
- Top speed: 35 km/h (hypothetical)
- Power: 1.2 metric horsepower (1.2 horsepower; 0.88 kilowatts) @ 180 rpm 1.75 newton-metres (1.29 pound force-feet) @ 180 rpm
- Ignition type: Bunsen cell/ignition coil hybrid
- Transmission: single speed
- Tires: Pneumatic
- Weight: 82 kilograms (181 lb) (dry)

The Millet motorcycle, designed in 1892 by Félix Théodore Millet, may have been the first motorcycle (or motorized bicycle) to use pneumatic tires. It had an unusual radial-configuration rotary engine incorporated into the rear wheel, believed to be the first one ever used to power a person-carrying vehicle of any type.

== Production history ==
A prototype with rear-wheel rotary engine ran in 1892. Production rights were acquired by Alexandre Darracq in 1894. Production halted following an unsuccessful entry in the Paris–Bordeaux–Paris race of 1895.

== Technology ==
The five cylinders were mounted radially in the rear wheel, with the connecting rods directly attached to the fixed crank of the hollow-drilled rear axle. The rear fender served as a fuel tank; a surface carburetor and air filter were located between the wheels. Ignition was electric via combination Bunsen cell and induction coil. Millet used a rotating handlebar twistgrip for its operation. It was started with pedals so the motorcycle could be moved even after engine failure. Maximum power was rated at 1.2 metric horsepower (1.2 hp), continuous power at 0.75 metric horsepower (0.74 hp) at 180 RPM. With the rated continuous power, the bike should have reached a speed of 35 km/h.

== See also ==
- List of motorcycles of the 1890s
