= Henriod =

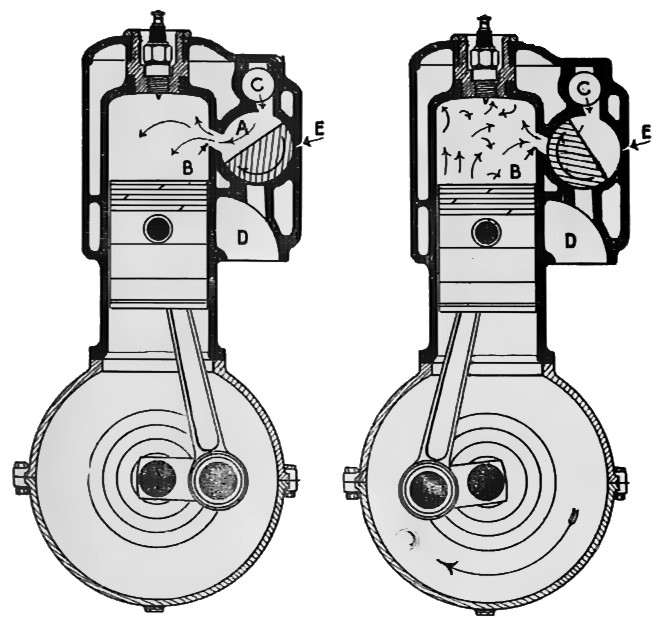
Rotary valve engine invented by Henriod

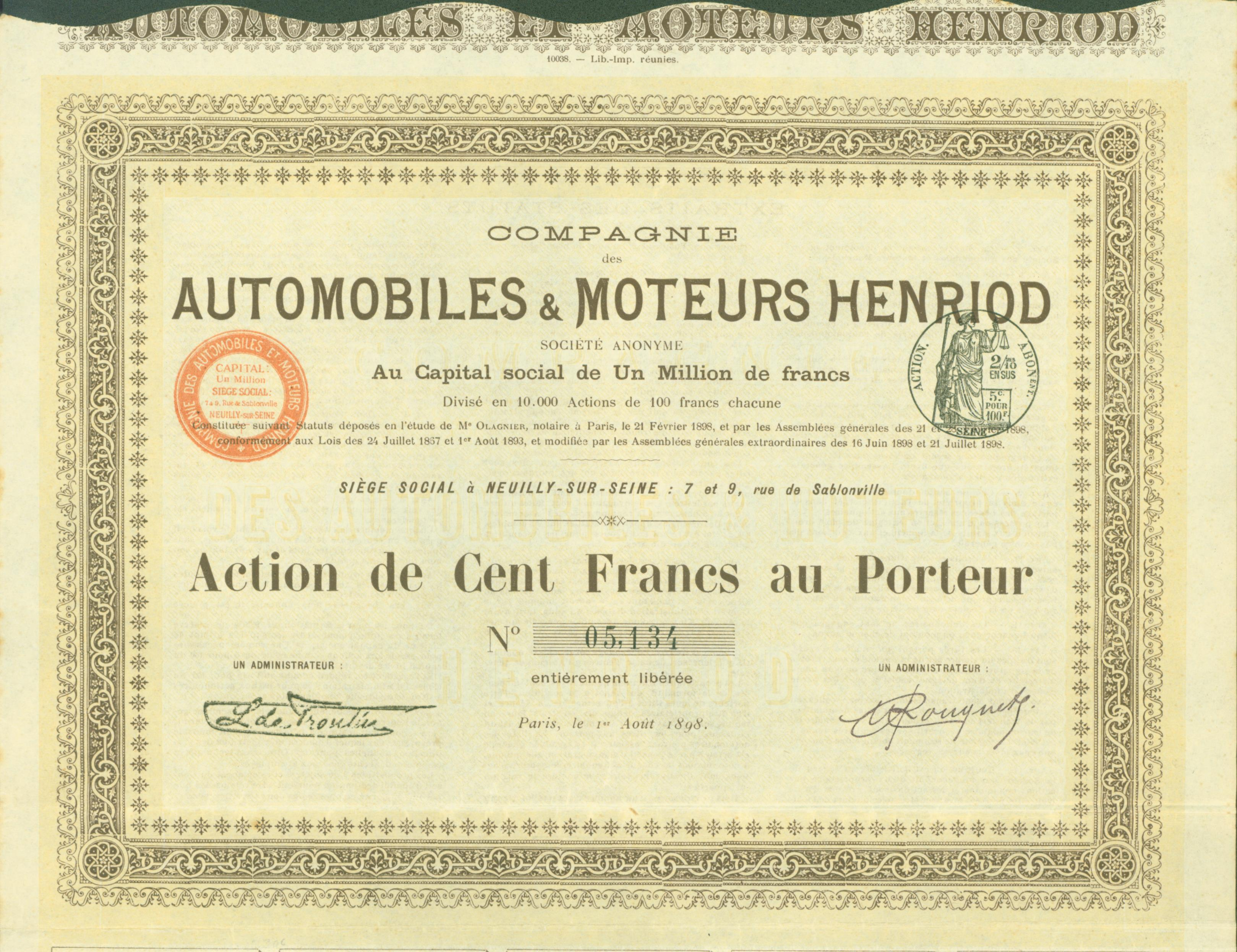
Share of the Compagnie des Automobiles & Moteurs Henriod S. A., issued 1. August 1908

C.E.Henriod & Cie and Automobiles Henriod & Cie (founded 1898), were enterprises based in Neuilly-sur-Seine, France. These companies were established by the pioneering Swiss automotive engineer Charles-Edouard Henriod born in Fleurier, Switzerland 22 May 1866 and died in Lausanne on 18 November 1941, along with his brother Fritz.

== Innovations ==
Henriod patented numerous inventions such as a gearbox on the back axle and front wheel drive. His inventions were made by automotive manufacturers in France and U.S.A.
