= Georges Roesch =

Roesch, Georges Henry, born Geneva 15 April 1891: died 7 November 1969, automotive engineer, was the Swiss-born son of a German-born blacksmith turned Geneva garage operator and his French-born wife.

He came to England in 1914 from Delaunay-Belleville, where he trained under Barbaroux, to work for Daimler. With little English and a German surname and accent the subsequent outbreak of the First World War meant twelve months under a cloud of suspicion until the authorities gave him the benefit of the doubt. In 1916, aged 25, he was hired by the London firm of Clément-Talbot as Chief Engineer. He developed a 1750 cc touring car for production after the end of hostilities. However in 1919 Talbot was acquired by Darracq and Company London, and the following year the resulting combination brought in Sunbeam to form S T D Motors. Talbot began to make the Coatalen and S T D Motors Paris designed Talbot 8-18 which was not a success. Roesch modified the design and turned it into a successful four-seater named Talbot's 10-23. The Talbot factory proved too small for volume production. Between 1920 and 1925 Roesch worked with STD under Louis Coatalen to develop a six-cylinder push-rod engine of striking simplicity and efficiency.

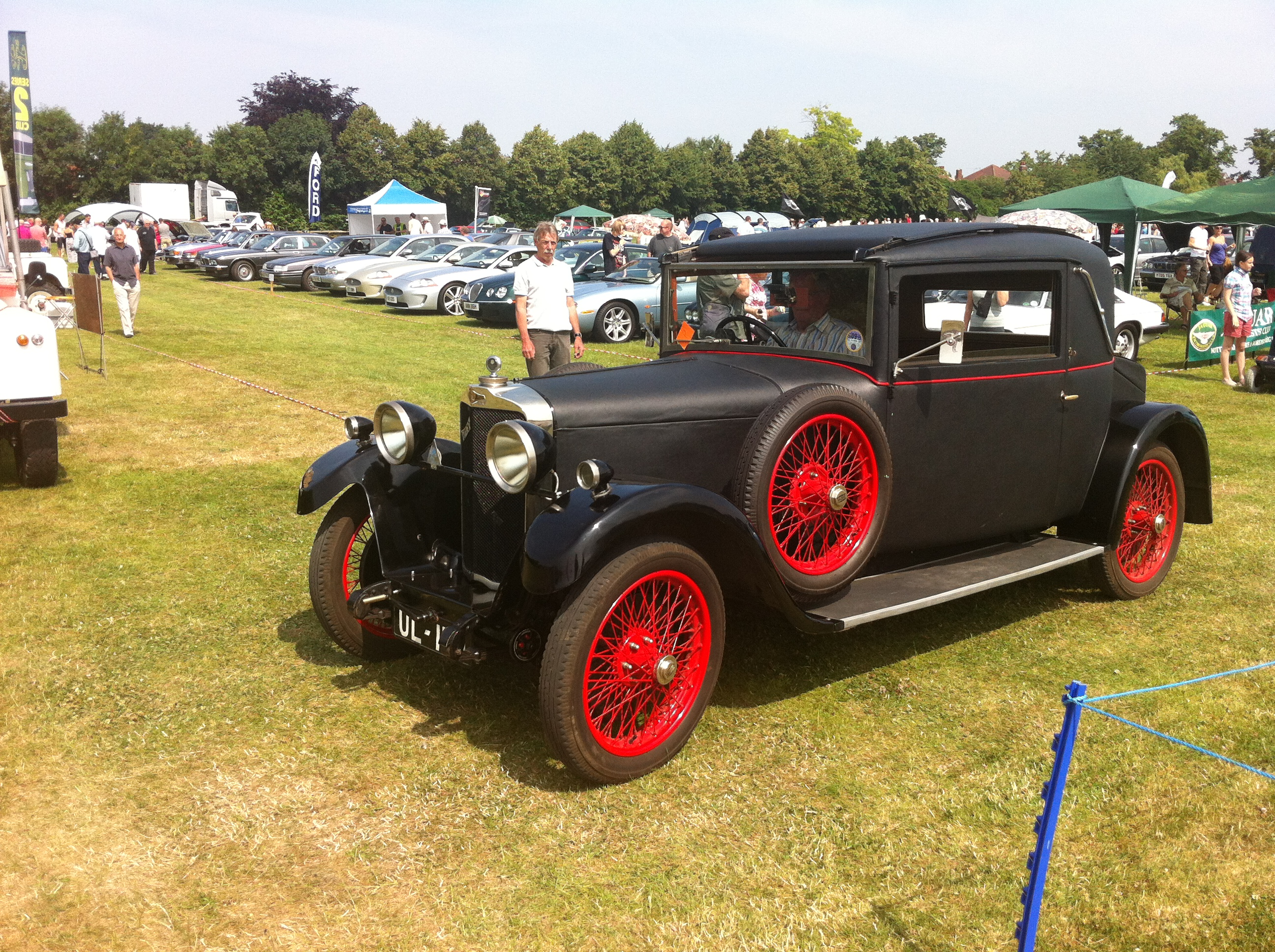
1929 Talbot 14-45 fabric close-coupled faux cabriolet

The first successful post war Talbot was the Georges Roesch-designed six-cylinder high-speed tourer, Talbot 14-45, released in October 1926 for London's Motor Show. Roesch had been called back from Paris, where he was working under Coatalen, to the dilapidated Talbot works in 1925 and chose to design a relatively expensive low-volume car to fit Talbot's capabilities that might save the Talbot business. The 14-45 was the star of the 1926 Motor Show. From that point forward all Roesch's Talbot cars sold well. Certain weaknesses of the 14-45 were established and remedied and because it would comfortably reach 75 mph Roesch renamed the car his Talbot 75. His engine was "uncannily smooth" spinning effortlessly to provide its astonishingly high output.

The Rootes Group took over Talbot in 1935. The first Rootes Sunbeam, named the Thirty, designed by Georges Roesch, was propelled with a new 100 mph 4503 cc straight-eight engine. There may have been as many as eight prototypes made and some were displayed at the 1936 Motor Show but the new model did not go into production and Roesch left Sunbeam-Talbot going to David Brown in 1939 to develop a tractor design. Dispirited he left David Brown and joined Frank Whittle's Power Jets. He continued to work on gas turbines for this rest of his career.

== Character ==
Georges Roesch was not a boastful or articulate man. An insight into his irascible perfectionism may be gained from the report that he refused ever to have a vacuum cleaner in his house because he found none of the existing vacuum cleaner designs satisfactory.
