= Talbot 105 =

Talbot 18-70 1930 - 1932 Talbot 105 1931 - 1935
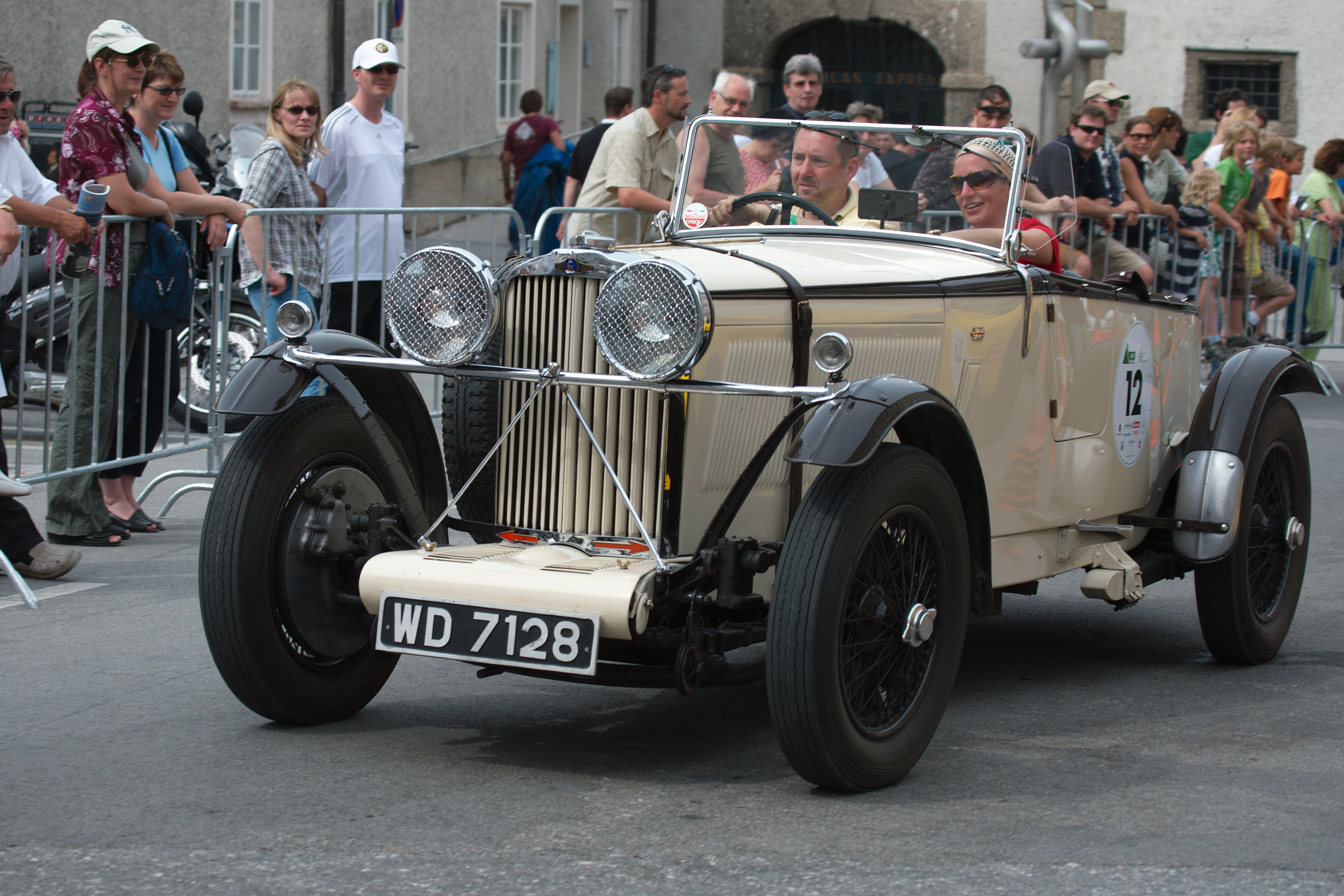

Overview
- Manufacturer: Talbot
- Also called: Talbot 70/75/90/95
- Production: 1930–1935
- Designer: Georges Roesch

Powertrain
- Engine: Straight six

Chronology
- Predecessor: Talbot 14-45

The Talbot 105 was a high powered sports car developed by Talbot designer Georges Roesch. It was famously fast, described by one authority as the fastest four-seater ever to race at Brooklands.

== History ==
The 75 was derived from the earlier 14-45, named according to its fiscal and actual horsepower. The six-cylinder engine displaced a volume of 1,666 cc and was the basis for all Talbot engines until the Rootes takeover in 1935.

The engine was repeatedly bored out further, giving rise to a succession of performance improvements. Throughout these developments, the exterior dimensions of the original 14-45 engine block remained the same although the 18-70 had an updated block with equally spaced bores. The later 105 had a different block again.

The 1930 London Motor Show saw the debut of the 18-70 model, bore and stroke both being increased to give an engine capacity increased to 2,276 cc. In this form the car was later called simply the Talbot 70 or 75. Higher compression ratios and a bigger Zenith carburettor resulted in an increase in power and the birth of the 90. Talbot's AO90s were highly successful in GP racing, coming third only to Speed 6 Bentleys in the 1931 Brooklands 500.

An increase in the engine capacity, still without any change to the exterior dimensions of the engine block, yielded a cylinder displacement of 2,969 cc for the iconic Talbot 105 model. In 1931 four 105s were tuned to provide a reported 119 bhp, at 4,800 rpm. In "Brooklands trim" further tuning and in increased compression ratio of 10:1 gave rise to a claimed 125 bhp.

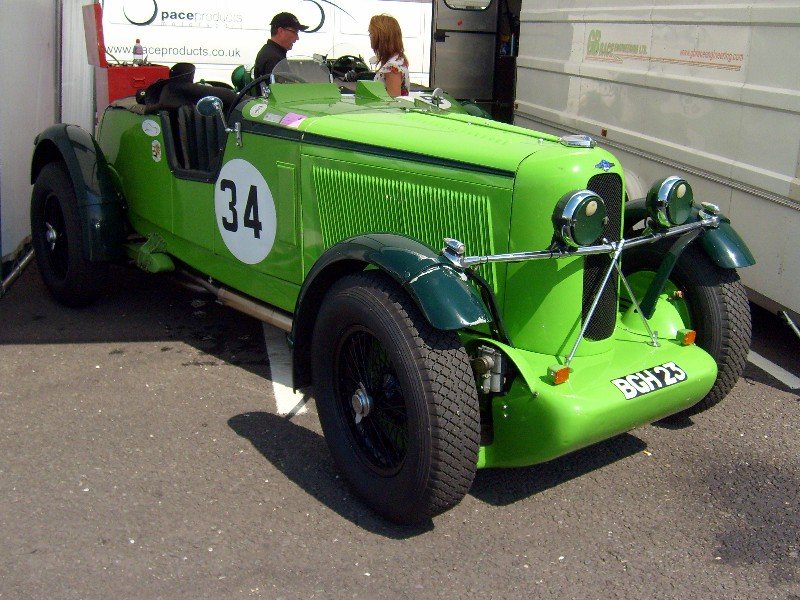
Talbot 105 Works Brooklands at Silverstone

The Talbot acquired its fame on the racing circuits, featuring prominently at Brooklands, in the north-eastern suburbs of Surrey. In 1932 Talbot pulled out of racing, but a major Talbot dealer named Warwick Wright successfully ran a team of three 105s that year, and other teams operated by dealers and enthusiasts continued to race the cars at least till 1938.
