= Clément-Talbot =

British motor vehicle manufacturer

Clément-Talbot Limited
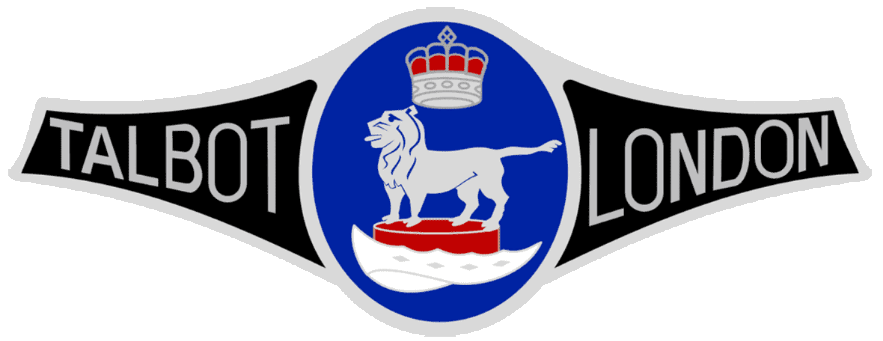
- Type: Private (1903–19); Subsidiary (1919–35)
- Industry: Automotive
- Founded: 1903 in London, England
- Founders: Charles Chetwynd-Talbot
- Defunct: 1935; 91 years ago
- Fate: Parent company acquired by Rootes Group, became a brand
- Successor: Sunbeam-Talbot Ltd.
- Headquarters: North Kensington, UK
- Area served: Worldwide
- Key people: Adolphe Clément; Charles Chetwynd-Talbot; Georges Roesch
- Products: Automobiles, ambulances
- Brands: Talbot
- Parent: Darracq & Co. (1919–35)

Clément-Talbot Limited was a British motor vehicle manufacturer with its works in Ladbroke Grove, North Kensington, London, founded in 1903. The new business's capital was arranged by Charles Chetwynd-Talbot (whose family name became the brand-name and whose family crest became the trademark), shareholders included automobile manufacturer, Adolphe Clément, along with Baron Auguste Lucas and Emile Lamberjack, (Note: Jean-Émile Lamberjack 1869–1912. Emile and his brother Dominique, whose father ran a restaurant on Paris's rue de Clichy, began by racing bicycles then motorcycles and started exporting French cars. Emile helped establish a Michelin tyre factory in Milton New Jersey. Until the end of the 19th century manufacturers preferred customers to visit the manufacturer's own premises and put down a one-third deposit. Once the flow of buyers became a nuisance they found it necessary to appoint agents. Emile became Fiat's first agent in Paris (his business ultimately became part of Fiat's SIMCA) and a Mercedes agent in December 1904. (p691, Automobile Topics, 26 December 1903) Dominique became Bugatti's Paris agent.) all of France.

The shareholders sold it in late 1919 to the company that became S.T.D. Motors. It kept its separate identity making cars designed specially for it or by its employees until 1934. After S.T.D.s financial collapse it was bought by the Rootes brothers. When Rootes acquired Clement-Talbot's parent company Darracq & Co. in 1935, it kept the Talbot name as a brand, then establishing Sunbeam-Talbot Limited in 1938.

== Origin ==
The first Talbots, re-badged Clément-Bayards built in France, were sold by the British Automobile Commercial Syndicate Limited, manager Daniel M. Weigel, (Note: "Daniel M. Weigel was managing director of the British Automobile Commercial Syndicate Limited. Started motoring in 1893 and has been a prominent figure in the business side of the industry ever since. In 1900 in conjunction with the Earl of Shrewsbury and Talbot he formed the British Automobile Commercial Syndicate Limited. Introduced the first "Clément-Talbot" car into England in 1901. In 1902 formed the firm of J Rothschild et fils Limited opening a London branch of that famous firm of Parisian motor-carriage builders. Is now connected with the firms of J Rothschild et fils Limited and the Maison Talbot, of the latter of which he is the managing director. Club A.C.G.B.&I." The Motoring Annual and Motorist's Year Book, 1904) from the Earl's premises at 97–98 Long Acre, which included Maison Talbot, importers of Michelin tyres. The earl's flourishing business was the importation, distribution through a large British network and retailing of many brands of European motor cars and associated products. These included: Panhard, Hotchkiss, Mors, and Clément-Gladiator cars. This business brought about the close association with businessman Adolphe Clément, and in April 1902 the Earl became the agent for Clement cars. By 1903 his car imports from France exceeded £2,000,000. The Earl closed this business in 1909, when its only advertised brand was Spyker, because it seemed foolish to compete with his own Talbot dealers.

In 1903 Clément-Talbot was formally incorporated "to carry on business as manufacturers of and dealers in horseless carriages and motor-cars, air-ships and the component parts thereof". 5 acres (20,000 m^{2}) later lifted to 28 acres (110,000 m^{2}) of land were purchased for a new factory in Ladbroke Grove, North Kensington, alongside the Great Western Railway line and between Wormwood Scrubs and the Kensal Green Cemetery. (51.52318°N 0.22010°W) The housing estate now on the site has Shrewsbury Street as its main access-way.

== Clément-Talbot Works ==
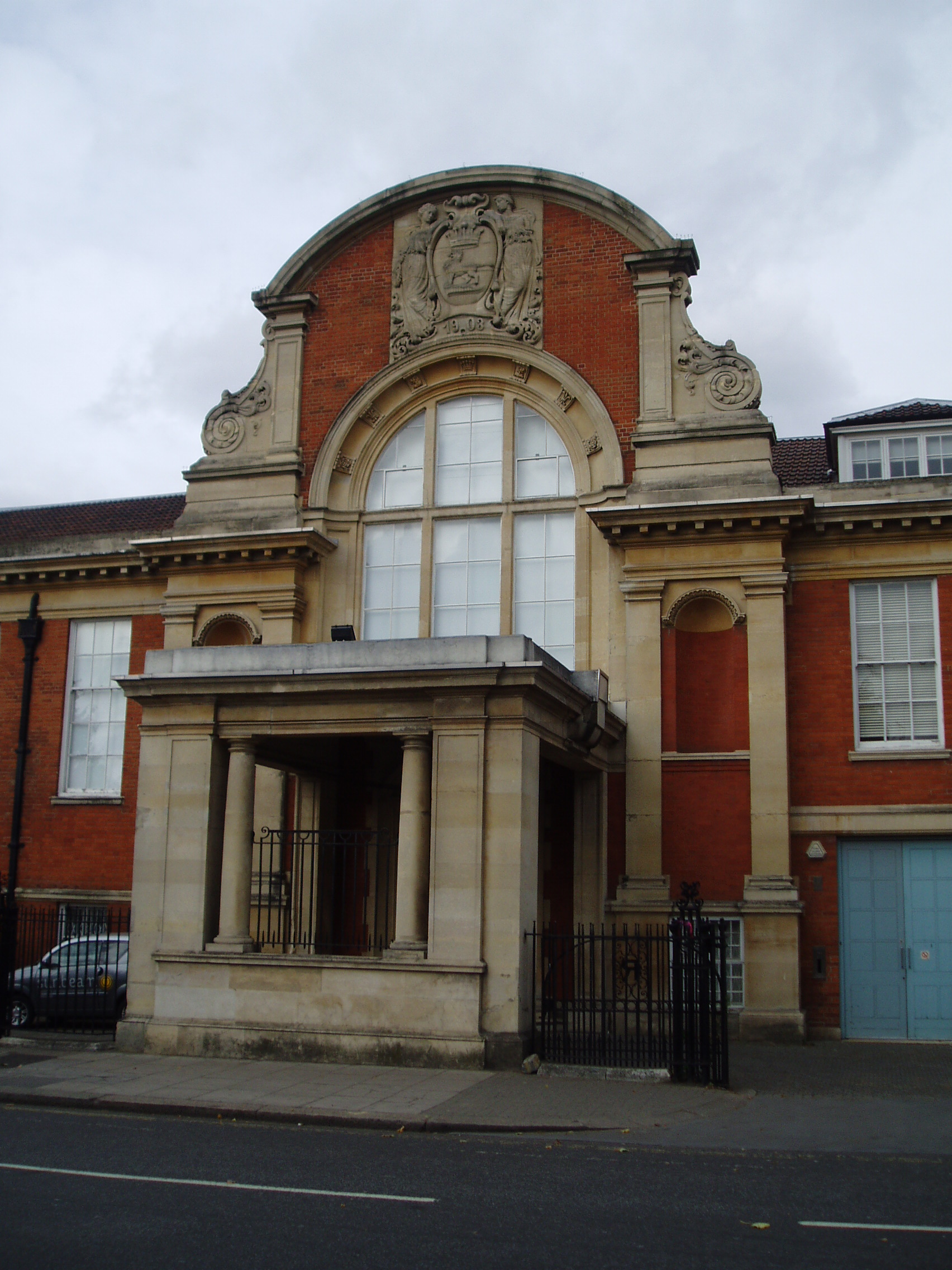
Clément-Talbot Works main entrance

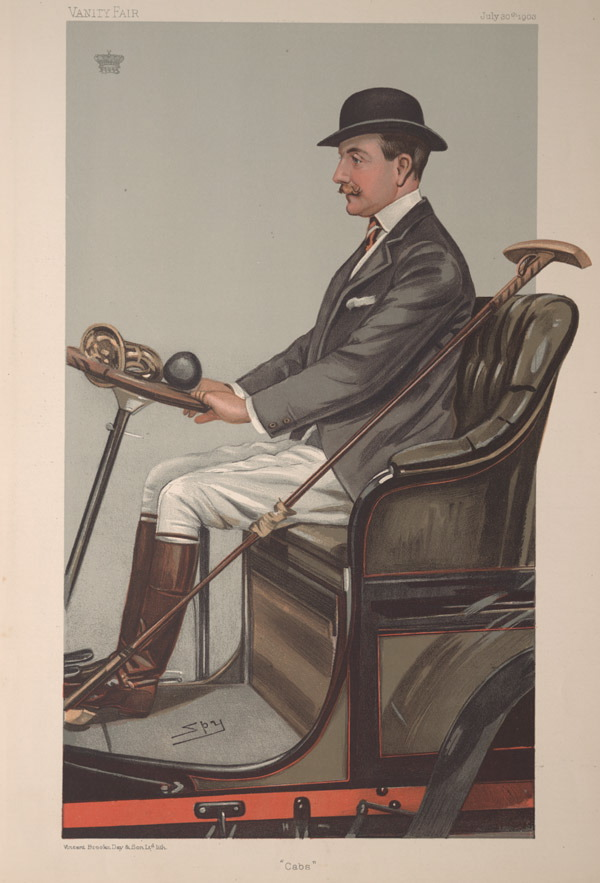
Lord Shrewsbury & Talbot 1903

The works administration building on Barlby Road is palatial. Now a block of offices known as Ladbroke Hall, its interiors as well as the exterior may be inspected today. High above the main entrance is Shrewsbury and Talbot's personal crest, a registered trademark, and used on all London Talbot radiator shells. Sunbeam-Talbot, later Sunbeam, kept it in use until the end of their production in 1967.

The brick workshops were given a saw-tooth roof line, the roof glazed to maximise natural light. It was equipped with the most modern machine tools and the administration building's reception area was laid out like a miniature palace with marble Ionic columns and gilded frescoes and its stained glass windows were etched with the Shrewsbury and Talbot coat of arms.

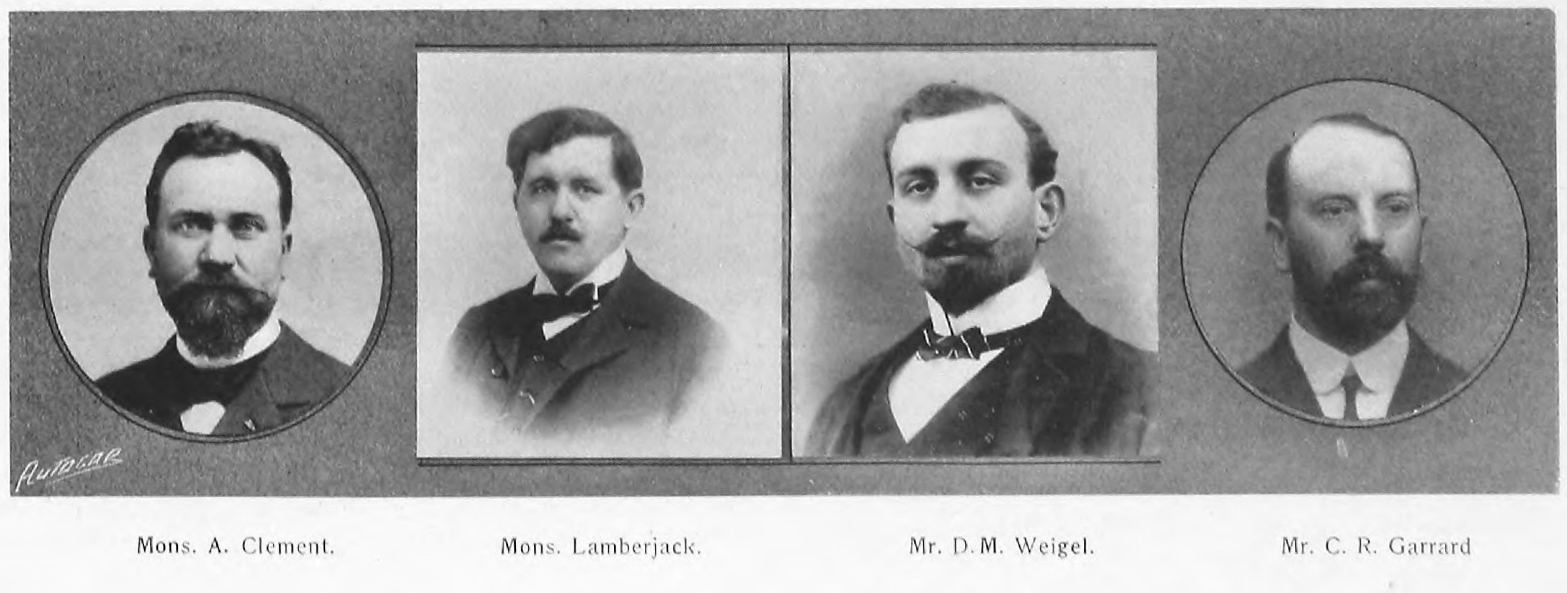
Clément, Lamberjack, Weigel and Garrard

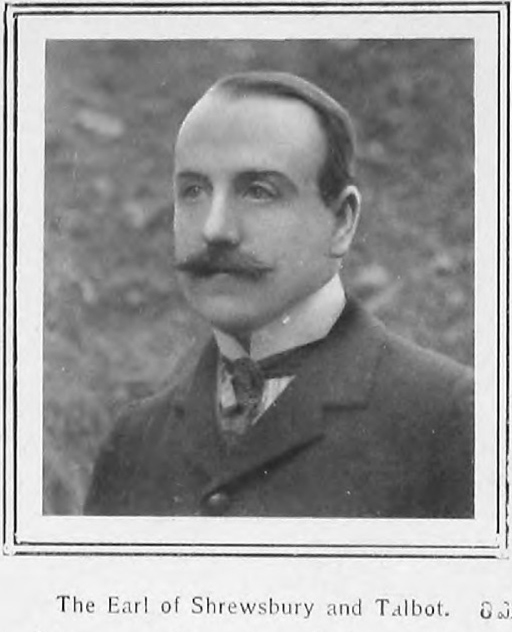
Chetwynd-Talbot

== Production ==
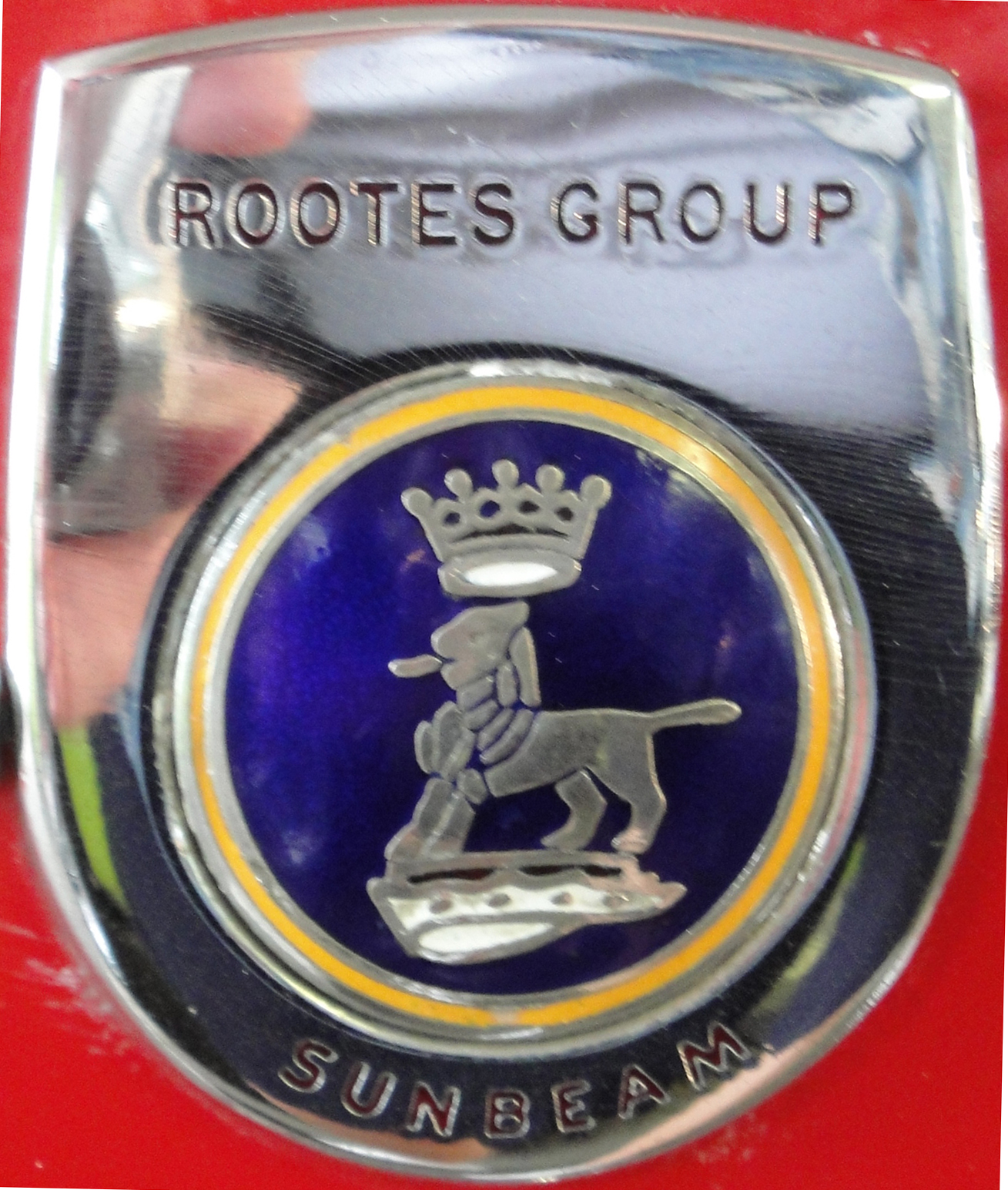
The lion and coronet Talbot crest on a 1966 Sunbeam Tiger

Weigel was appointed managing director and Charles Riley Garrard works manager of Clément-Talbot. Kensington assembly got under way in 1904 initially using imported components. In December 1904 speaking at their annual trade dinner in the presence of all directors the Earl described Clément-Talbot as "partly-controlled by French interests". At that time production was entirely British made except for the engines imported from France. The first wholly British designs were made in 1907. However, in 1908 the opportunity was taken to equip new cars with a very successful new Clément-Bayard engine of L-head design with greatly improved performance. Its more compact combustion chamber gave faster ignition and allowed higher compression ratios. Talbots could now match, even beat Vauxhalls and Sunbeams in competition

=== Cars offered by Clément-Talbot London (1904–1916) ===
Cars made in France are marked with an asterisk

Information assembled from The Autocar Buyer's Guide and published in Appendix V, Ian Nickols and Kent Karslake, Motoring Entente, Cassell, London 1956

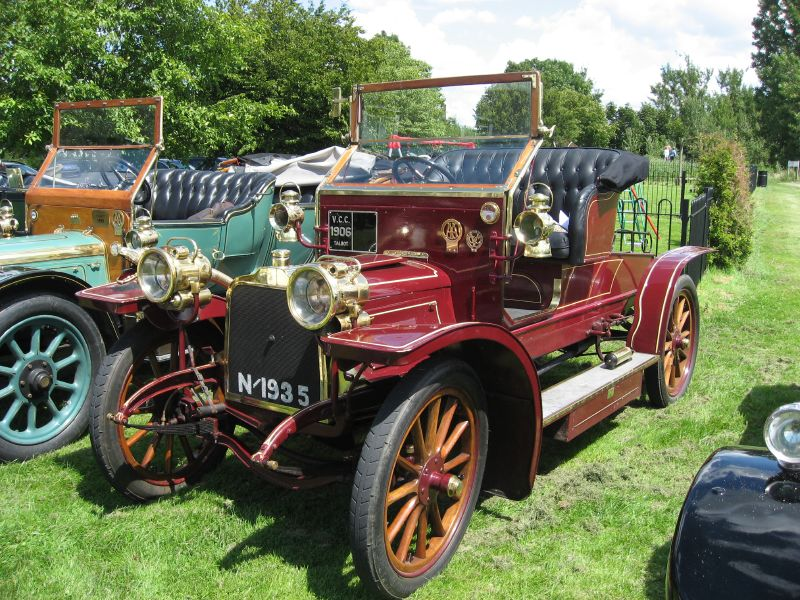
1906 20/24 two-seater

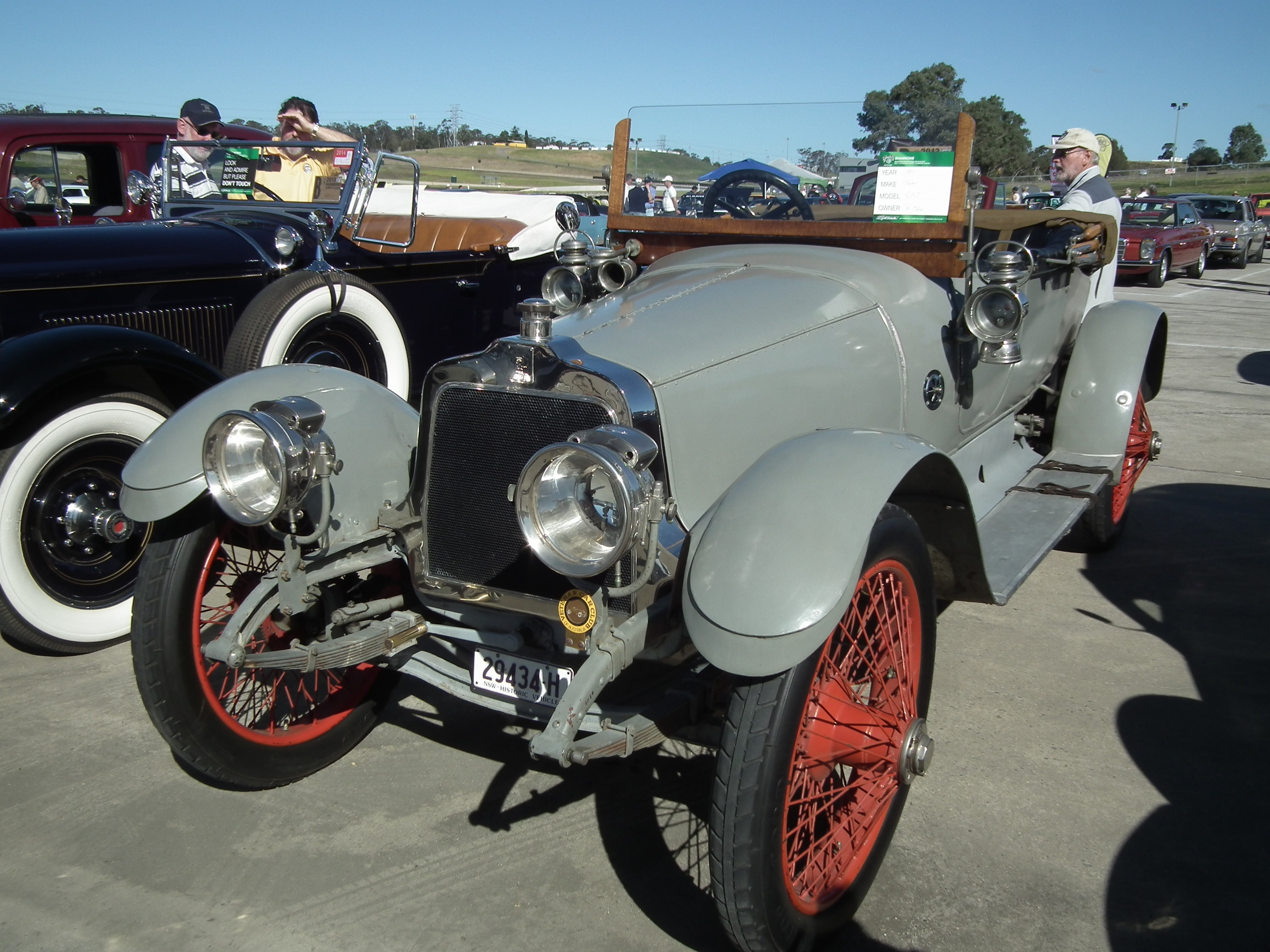
1910 20 h.p. open 2-seater

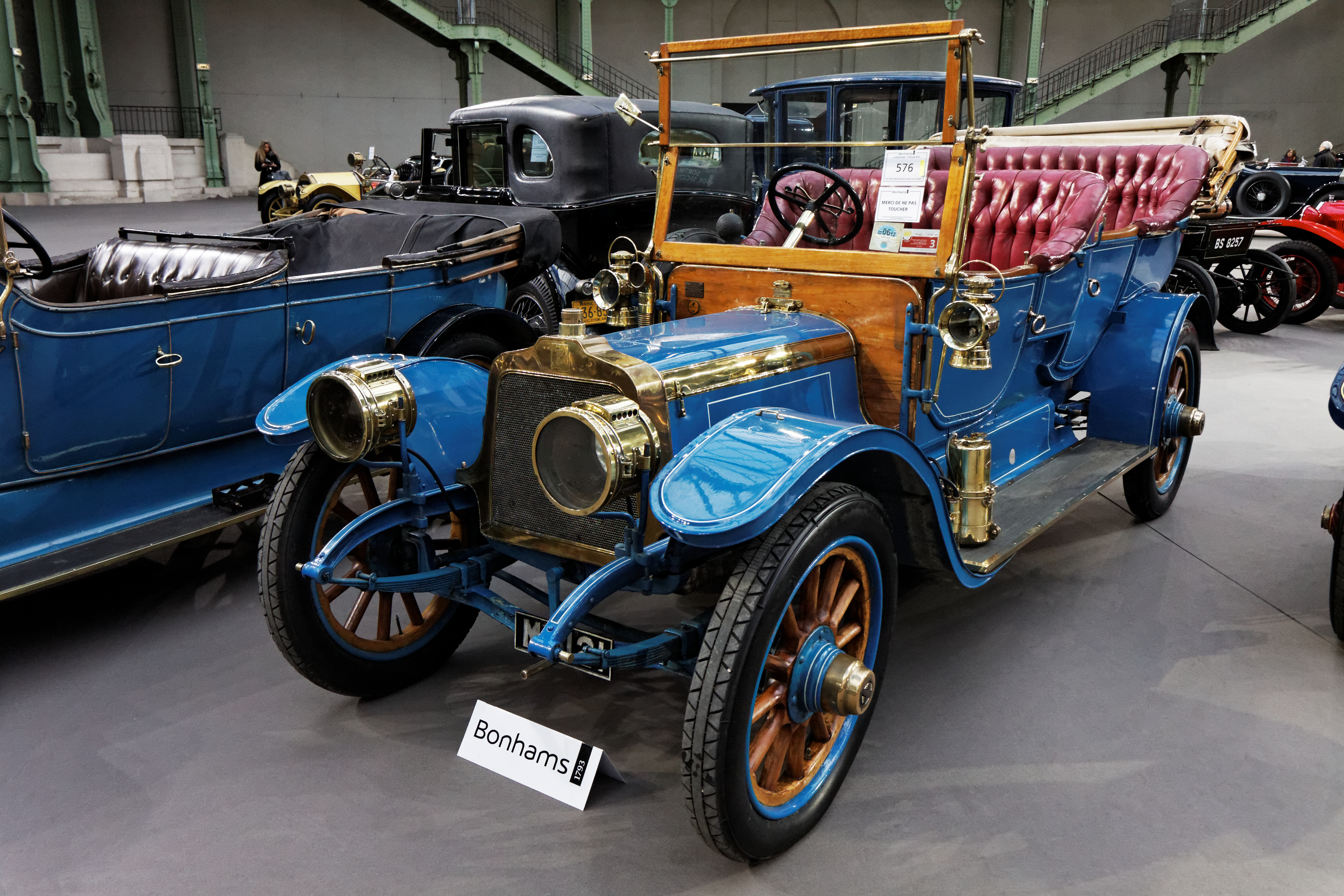
1910 25 h.p. tourer

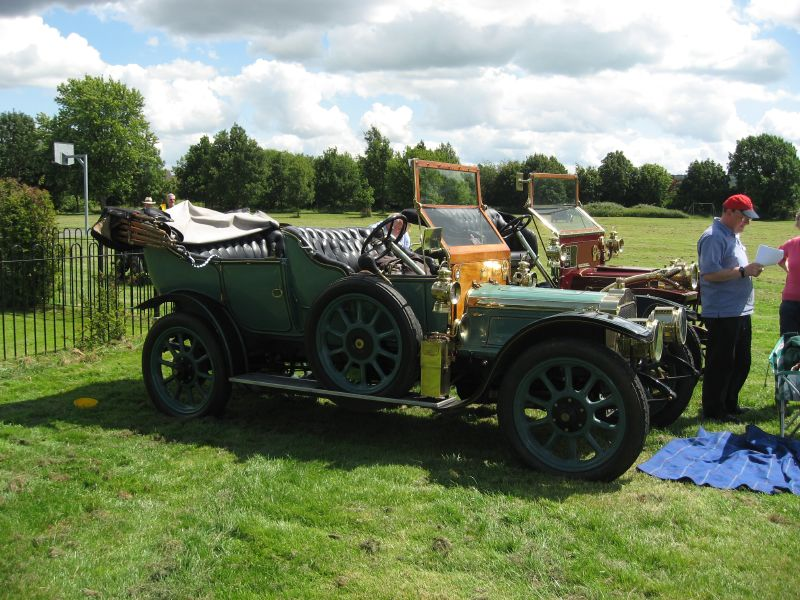
1911 15 h.p. tourer

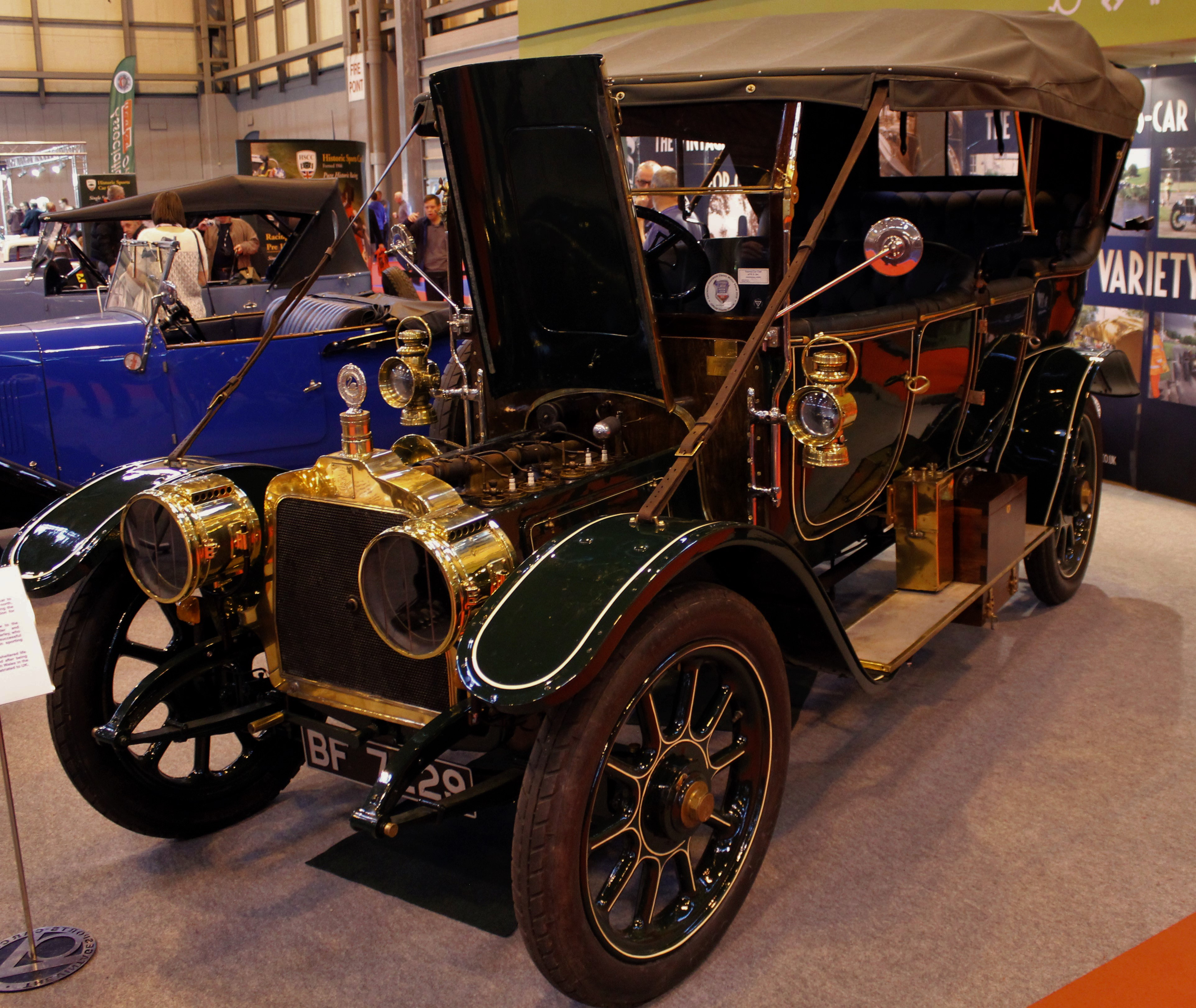
1911 15 h.p. tourer

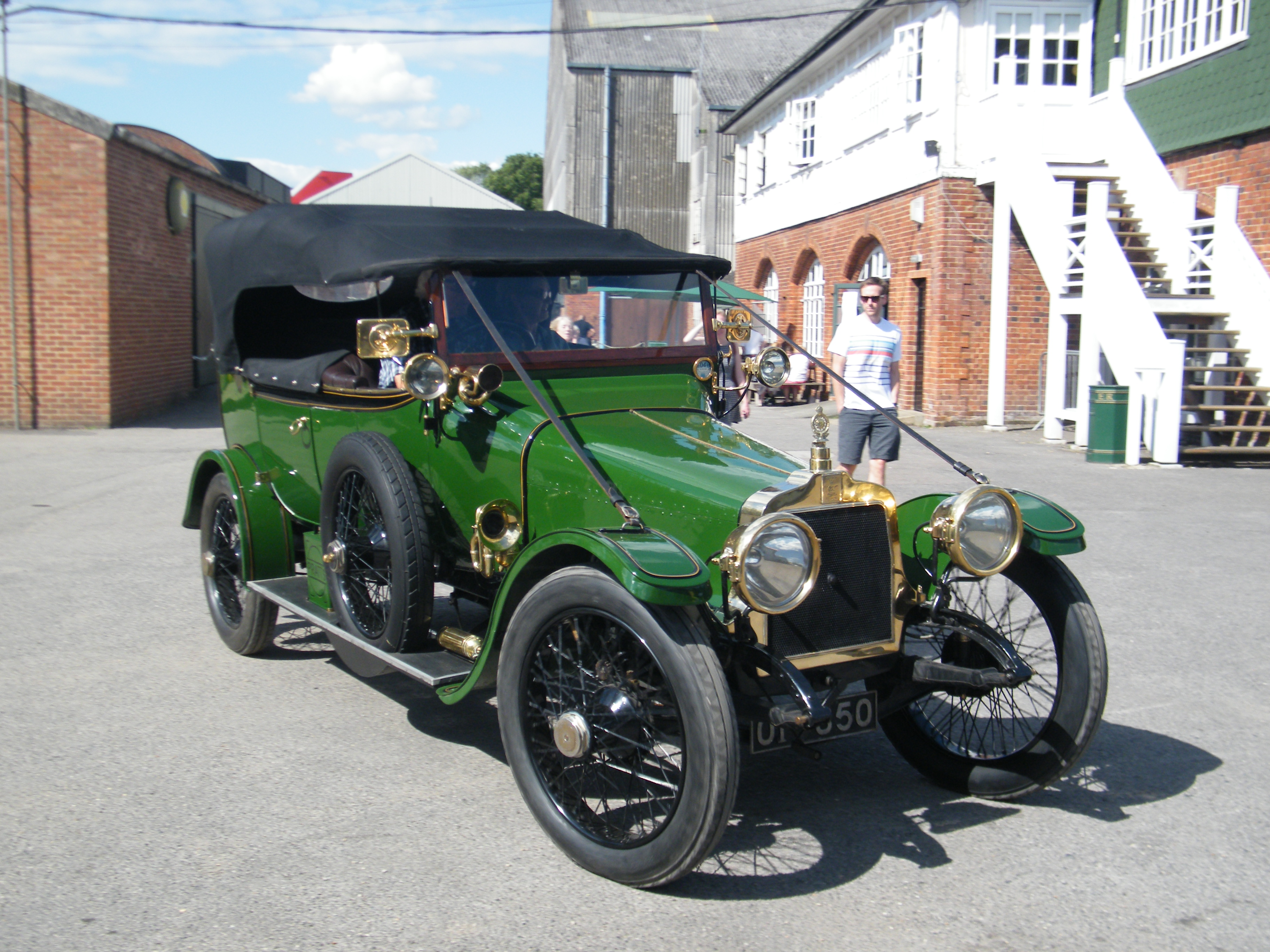
1913 20 horsepower tourer

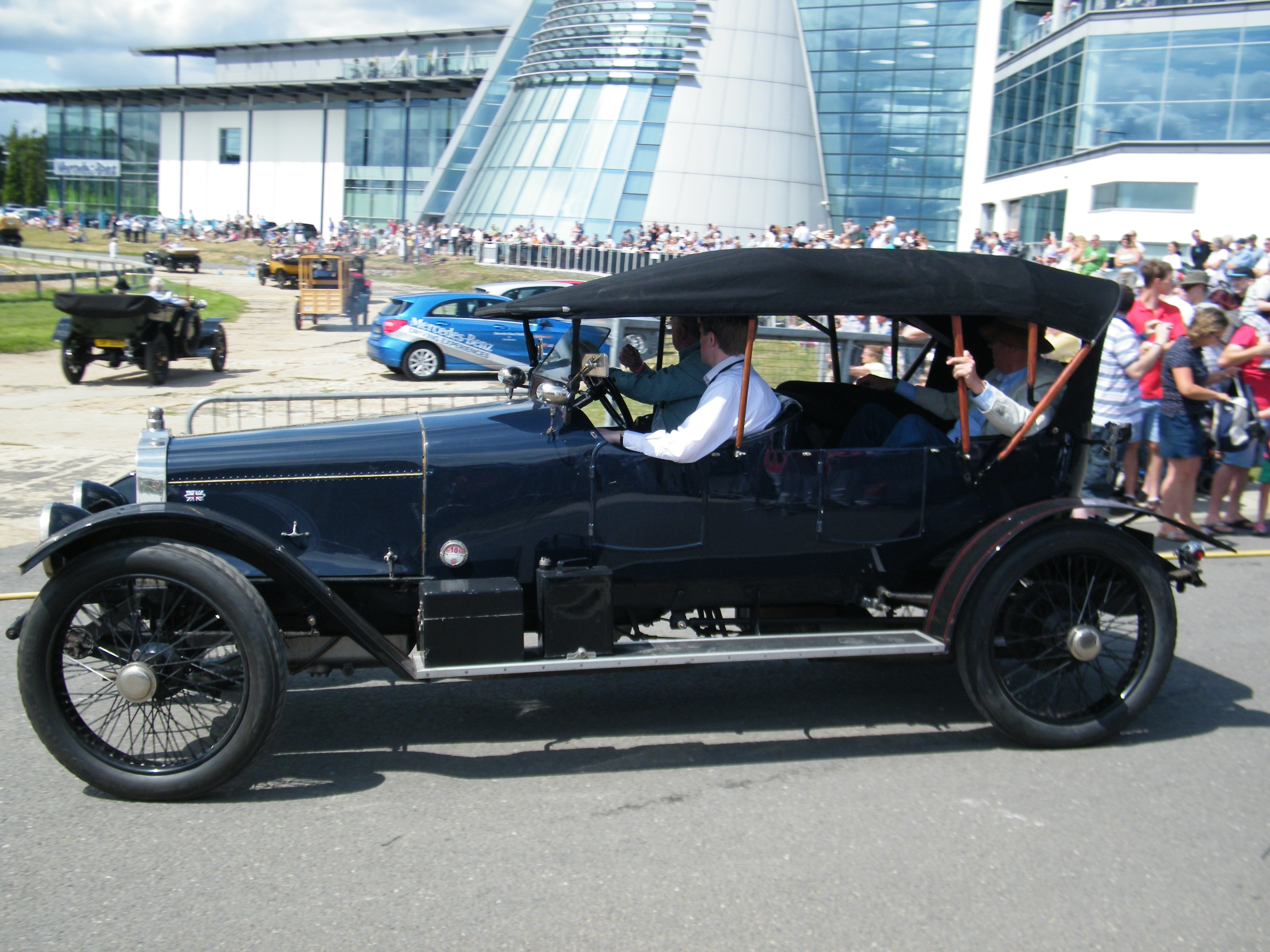
1915 Talbot 25/50 tourer

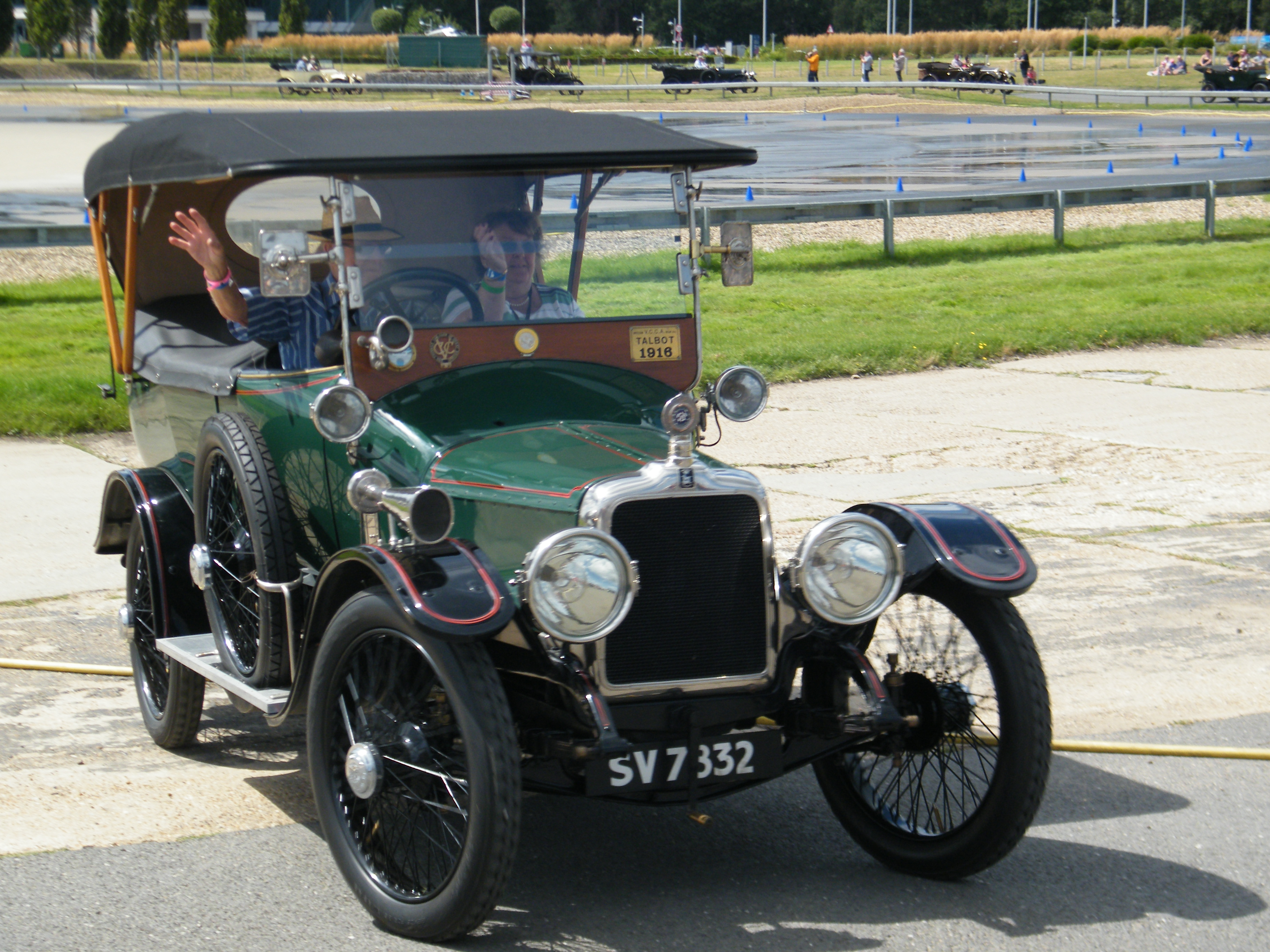
1916 12 h.p. tourer

1923 8/18 open two-seater

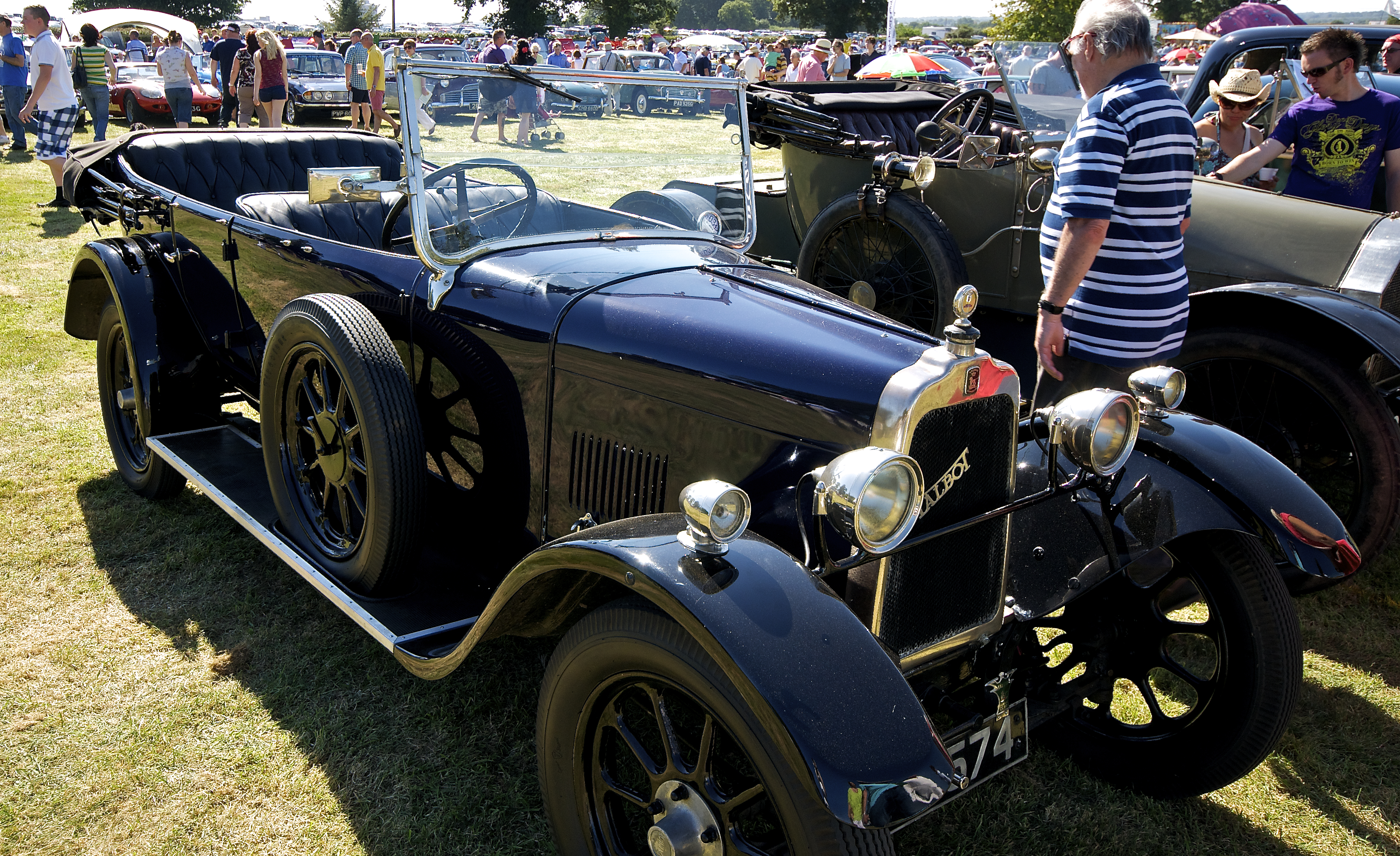
1925 (c.) 10/23 tourer

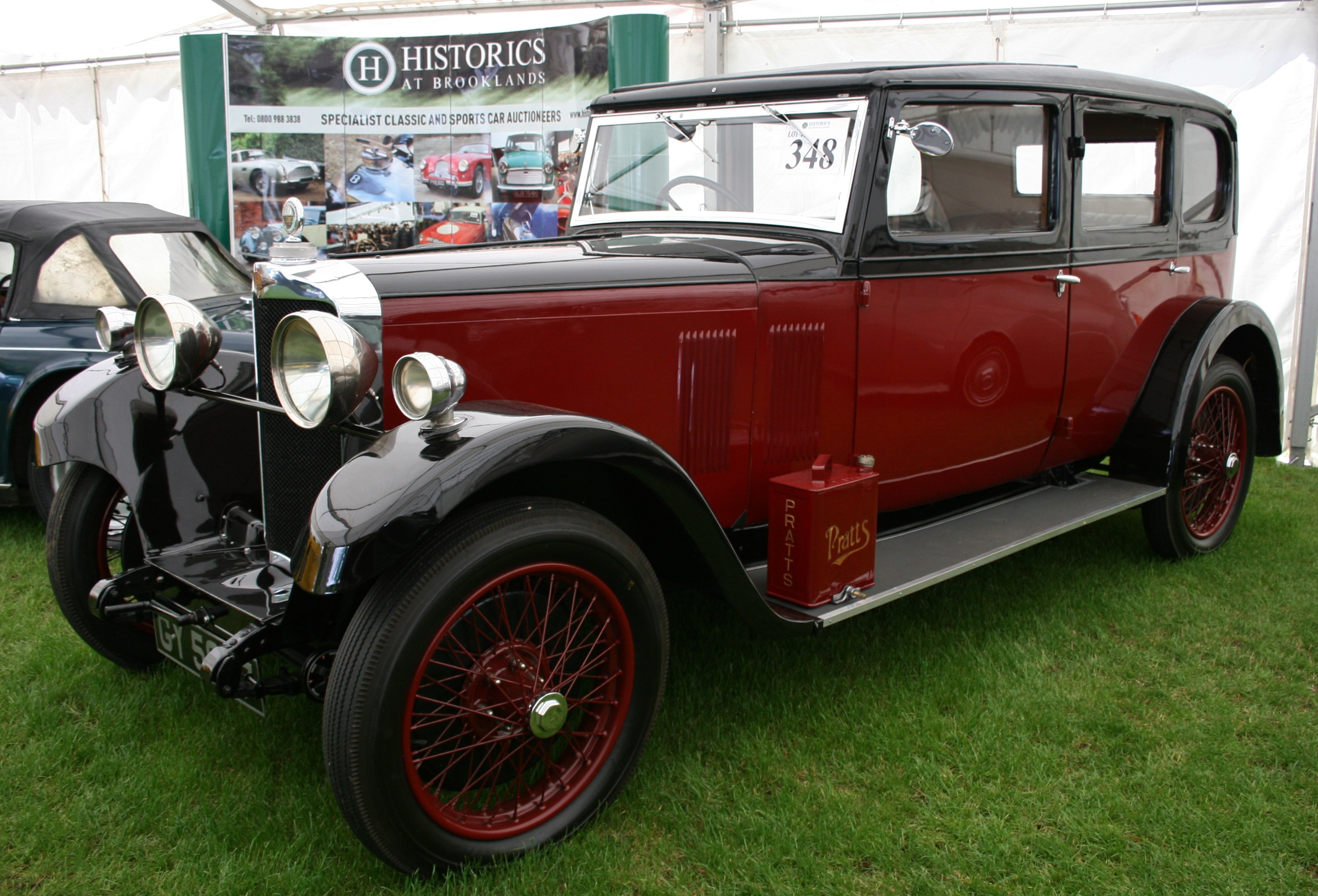
1932 Talbot 14/45 saloon

Name	Cyl	Cubic capacity	Bore and stroke	Tax h.p.	Brake h.p.	Years in production	Speeds	Wheelbase	Track
7 hp	2	1004	80 x 100	7.9		1905–1906	3	70 in (1778 mm)	
8 hp	2	1004	80 x 100	7.9		1904–1906	3	78 in (1981 mm)	
8/10 hp *	2	1248	85 x 110	9		1907–1907	3	96 in (2438 mm)	51 in (1295 mm)
9 hp	2	1885	100 x 120	12.4		1905–1905	3		
10 hp	2	1885	100 x 120	12.4		1905–1906	3		
10 hp	2	1885	100 x 120	12.4		1908–1908	4	110 in (2794 mm)	53 in (1346 mm)
10/12 hp	2	1885	100 x 120	12.4		1907–1907	4	93 in (2362 mm)	53 in (1346 mm)
10/14 hp *	4	1591	75 x 90	14		1907–1907	3	108 in (2743 mm)	51 in (1295 mm)
11 hp	2	1526	90 x 120	10		1904–1904	3		
12 hp	4	2409	80 x 120	15.9		1905–1915	4		
12 hp	4	2724	85 x 120	17.9		1905–1905	4		
12 hp	4	2724	85 x 120	17.9		1906–1906	4	104 in (2642 mm)	
12 hp	4	2724	85 x 120	17.9		1906–1906	3	88 in (2235 mm)	
12 hp *	4	2409	80 x 120	15.9		1908–1908	3	114 in (2896 mm)	55 in (1397 mm)
12 hp	4	2409	80 x 120	15.9		1909–1909	4	103.5 in (2629 mm)	50 in (1270 mm)
12 hp	4	2409	80 x 120	15.9		1910–1910	4	110 in (2794 mm)	51 in (1295 mm)
12 hp	4	2409	80 x 120	15.9		1911–1912	4	108 in (2743 mm)	51 in (1295 mm)
12 hp	4	2409	80 x 120	15.9		1913–1914	4	112 in (2845 mm)	51 in (1295 mm)
12 hp	4	2409	80 x 120	15.9		1915–1915	4	112 in (2845 mm)	52 in (1321 mm)
14 hp	4	2409	80 x 120	15.9		1904–1904	4		
15 hp	4	2976	90 x 117	20.1		1907–1907	4	98 in (2489 mm)	55 in (1397 mm)
15 hp	4	2976	90 x 117	20.1		1908–1908	4	106 in (2692 mm)	55 in (1397 mm)
15 hp	4	2976	90 x 117	20.1		1909–1909	4	116 in (2946 mm)	55 in (1397 mm)
15 hp	4	2976	90 x 117	20.1		1910–1910	4	116 in (2946 mm)	55 in (1397 mm)
15 hp	4	3561	90 x 140	20.1		1911–1912	4	118 in (2997 mm)	55 in (1397 mm)
15 hp	4	3561	90 x 140	20.1		1913–1913	4	119 in (3023 mm)	55 in (1397 mm)
15-20 hp	4	2610	80 x 130	15.9		1914–1914	4	112 in (2845 mm)	51 in (1295 mm)
15-20 hp	4	2610	80 x 130	15.9		1915–1915	4	121 in (3073 mm)	52 in (1321 mm)
16 hp	4	3053	90 x 120	20.1		1905–1905	4		
20 hp	4	3053	90 x 120	20.1		1904–1904	4		
20 hp	4	3770	100 x 120	24.8		1906–1906	4	92 in (2337 mm)	55 in (1397 mm)
20 hp	4	3770	100 x 120	24.8		1907–1907	4	117 in (2972 mm)	55 in (1397 mm)
20 hp	6	3614	80 x 120	23.8		1910–1910	4	120 in (3048 mm)	55 in (1397 mm)
20 hp	6	3614	80 x 120	23.8		1911–1911	4	122 in (3099 mm)	55 in (1397 mm)
20 hp	6	3614	80 x 120	23.8		1912–1912	4	123 in (3124 mm)	55 in (1397 mm)
20 hp	6	3614	80 x 120	23.8		1913–1913	4	124 in (3150 mm)	55 in (1397 mm)
20-30 hp	4	3561	90 x 140	20.1		1914–1915	4	127 in (3226 mm)	55.5 in (1410 mm)
24 hp	4	4398	100 x 140	24.8		1905–1905	4		
24 hp	4	4398	100 x 140	24.8		1906–1906	4	110 in (2794 mm)	55 in (1397 mm)
24/30 hp *	4	4398	100 x 140	24.8		1907–1907	4	119 in (3023 mm)	55 in (1397 mm)
25 hp	4	4155	105 x 120	27.3		1908–1908	4	117 in (2972 mm)	55 in (1397 mm)
25 hp	4	4155	105 x 120	27.3		1909–1909	4	116 in (2946 mm)	55 in (1397 mm)
25 hp	4	4447	100.5 x 140	25		1910–1910	4	120 in (3048 mm)	55 in (1397 mm)
25 hp	4	4447	100.5 x 140	25		1911–1912	4	118 in (2997 mm)	55 in (1397 mm)
25 hp	4	4447	100.5 x 140	25		1913–1913	4	119 in (3023 mm)	55 in (1397 mm)
25-30 hp	4	4447	100.5 x 140	25		1914–1914	4	127 in (3226 mm)	55.5 in (1410 mm)
25-30 hp	4	4447	100.5 x 140	25		1915–1915	4	132 in (3353 mm)	55.5 in (1410 mm)
25-40 hp	6	3614	80 x 120	23.8		1914–1914	4	132 in (3353 mm)	55.5 in (1410 mm)
25-50 hp	6	3921	80 x 130	23.8		1915–1915	4	139 in (3531 mm)	55.5 in (1410 mm)
27 hp	4	4942	110 x 130	30		1904–1904	4		
35 hp	4	6333	120 x 140	35.7		1905–1905	4		
35 hp	4	6333	120 x 140	35.7		1906–1906	4	116 in (2946 mm)	55 in (1397 mm)
35 hp	4	5428	120 x 120	35.7		1908–1911	4	118 in (2997 mm)	55 in (1397 mm)
35/45 hp *	4	6333	120 x 140	35.7		1907–1908	4	125 in (3175 mm)	55 in (1397 mm)
50/60 hp *	4	8624	140 x 140	48.6		1907–1908	4	129 in (3277 mm)	57 in (1448 mm)

== Sold out ==
In autumn 1919 A Darracq and Company (1905) agreed terms for their purchase of all the shares in Clément-Talbot as of 31 July 1918. Auguste Oddenino, Regent Street restaurateur and businessman was, by then, a major shareholder in Clément-Talbot. Adolphe Clémente-Bayard's Levallois factory did not flourish after the Armistice of 11 November 1918. He lost interest in motor manufacturing. In 1921 he sold his works at Levallois to André Citroën, while the Earl of Shrewsbury and Talbot died the same year.

In 1920 London's Darracq added Sunbeam Motor Car Company to its enterprise and renamed itself S.T.D. Motors. Shareholders and subsequent commentators were at loss to explain the commercial advantages given by the combination. Each of the three companies continued to operate independently. S.T.D.'s products were made in respectively, Wolverhampton, London and Paris. Anthony Blight believes Coatalen was drawn back to full-time efforts at S.T.D. by the possibility of racing cars under three brand names and of two nationalities. He had not long retired from his chief engineer post at Sunbeam and was now a design consultant in Paris in his native France.

== Automobiles Talbot Suresnes ==
The process of dropping the Darracq name for the Paris products was begun in early 1919 when new cars were badged Talbot-Darracq. In 1920 Darracq was dropped altogether from Talbot-Darracq. Owen Clegg at Suresnes, Paris, would design new cars to be built in Suresnes and Kensington.

Louis Coatalen who had remained a director of S.T.D. joined S.T.D. Motors as chief engineer and blocked Clegg's new designs. Coatalen's principal interest was a new Sunbeam racing car and, of course, a whole new range of products for Wolverhampton and Paris. Kensington would have to build a small car for the utility market. The new utility Talbot would be designed in Paris by Coatalen's freshly assembled team.

== Clément-Talbot London continue ==
At first the Kensington factory kept its employees busy converting wartime ambulances to Talbot touring cars. When that ran out they had to revert to their prewar models, which were luxury cars and almost impossible to sell in the new slump of mid-1920. They were asked to build the two new 3-litre straight eight S.T.D. Grand Prix cars and a 1½-litre variant – all to wear a Talbot radiator.

=== Post war designs ===
8-18 a Paris design

A small fast chic "utility" car, it sold mostly to country doctors and other professional men. Designed in Paris, it did not have differential burst tyres, which broke spring mountings and gave drivers worse performance at corners. It was also fifty per cent too expensive for the "utility" class. A made-in-Barlby-Road Talbot, it also turned up from Acton (W & G Du Cros) with a different-shaped radiator as a locally assembled Suresnes Darracq.

10-23 a Roesch amelioration

A bored out 8-18 engine, 1074 cc, a differential, a longer and stronger wheelbase and chassis with the back springs properly tied on. 2½ cwt heavier, 280 lb (130 kg) it was slower but seated four. It was a commercial success.

12-30 the first Talbot Six and another Paris design

An 8-18 with two more cylinders, 1454 cc. Weight and price were both up 75 per cent, power up 50 per cent. Mitigated by "delightful" gearbox, and light and accurate controls. Further mitigated the following year by an increased bore so its capacity was now 1612 cc. Neither popular nor successful it is only remembered for being the first Talbot Six.

=== Cars built by Clément-Talbot London (1919–1938) ===
Information assembled from The Autocar Buyer's Guide and published in Appendix V, Ian Nickols and Kent Karslake, Motoring Entente, Cassell, London 1956

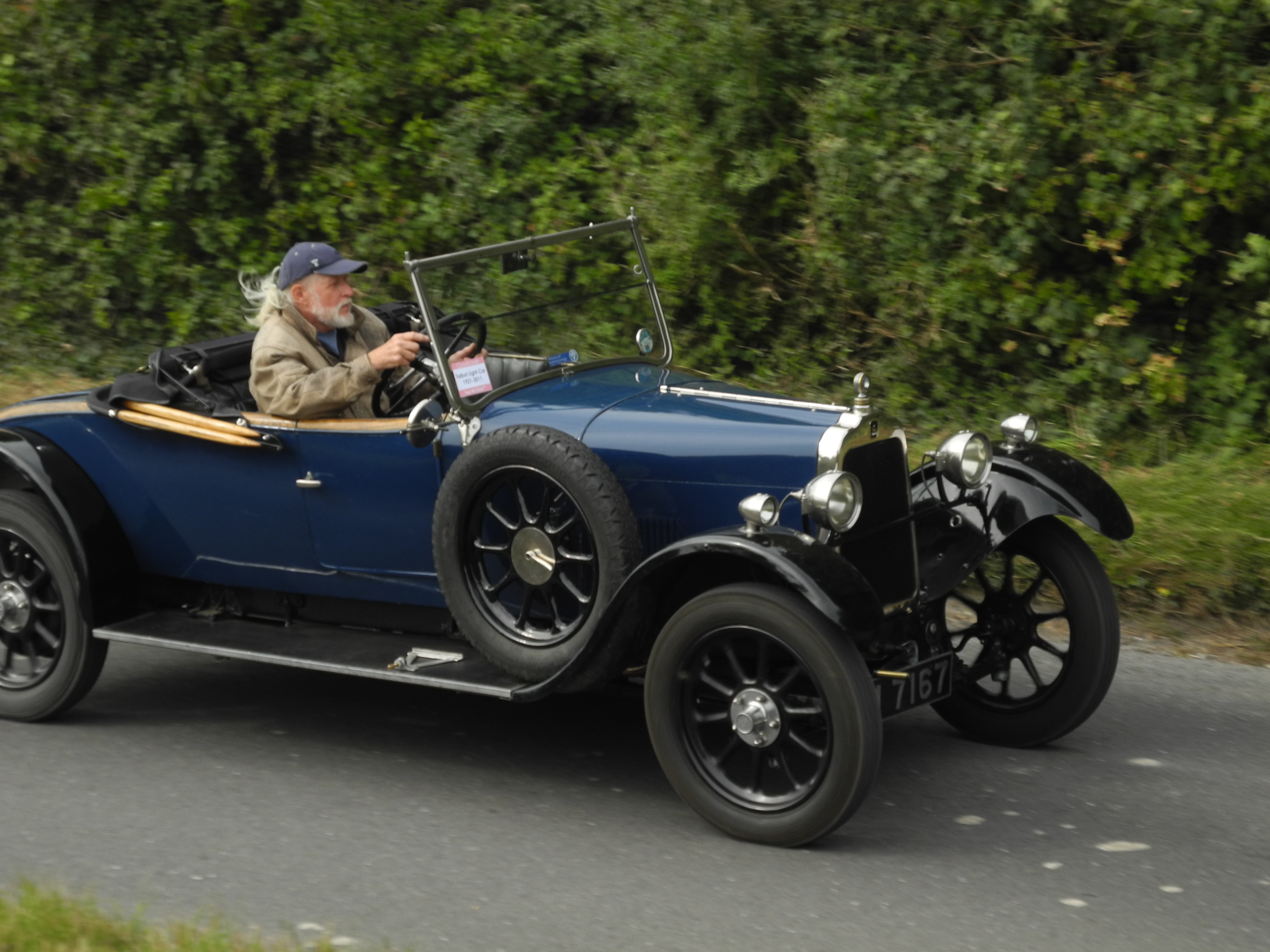
10-23 9 horsepower open two-seater 1074 cc, first registered December 1926

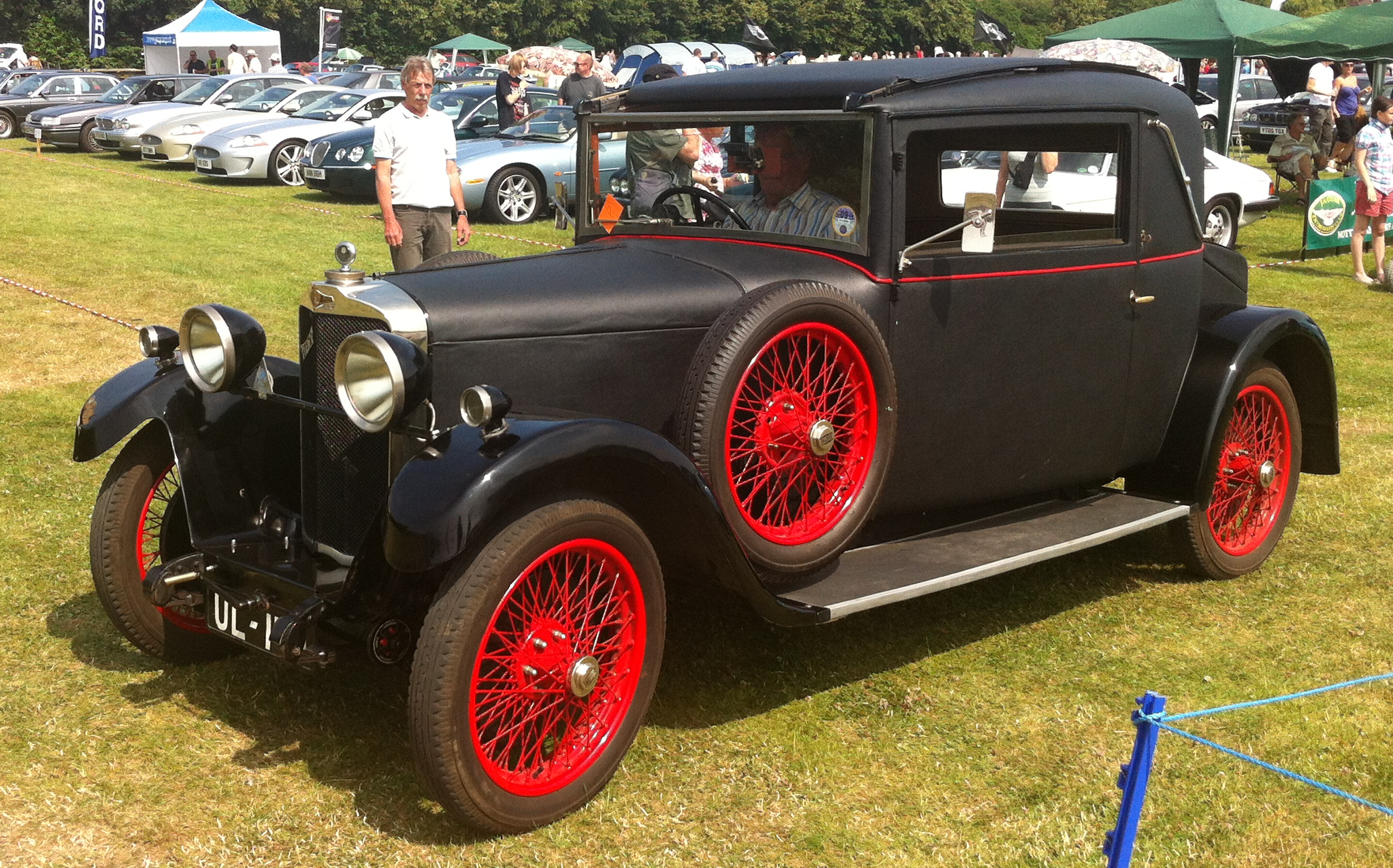
14-45 fabric coupé 1929 London

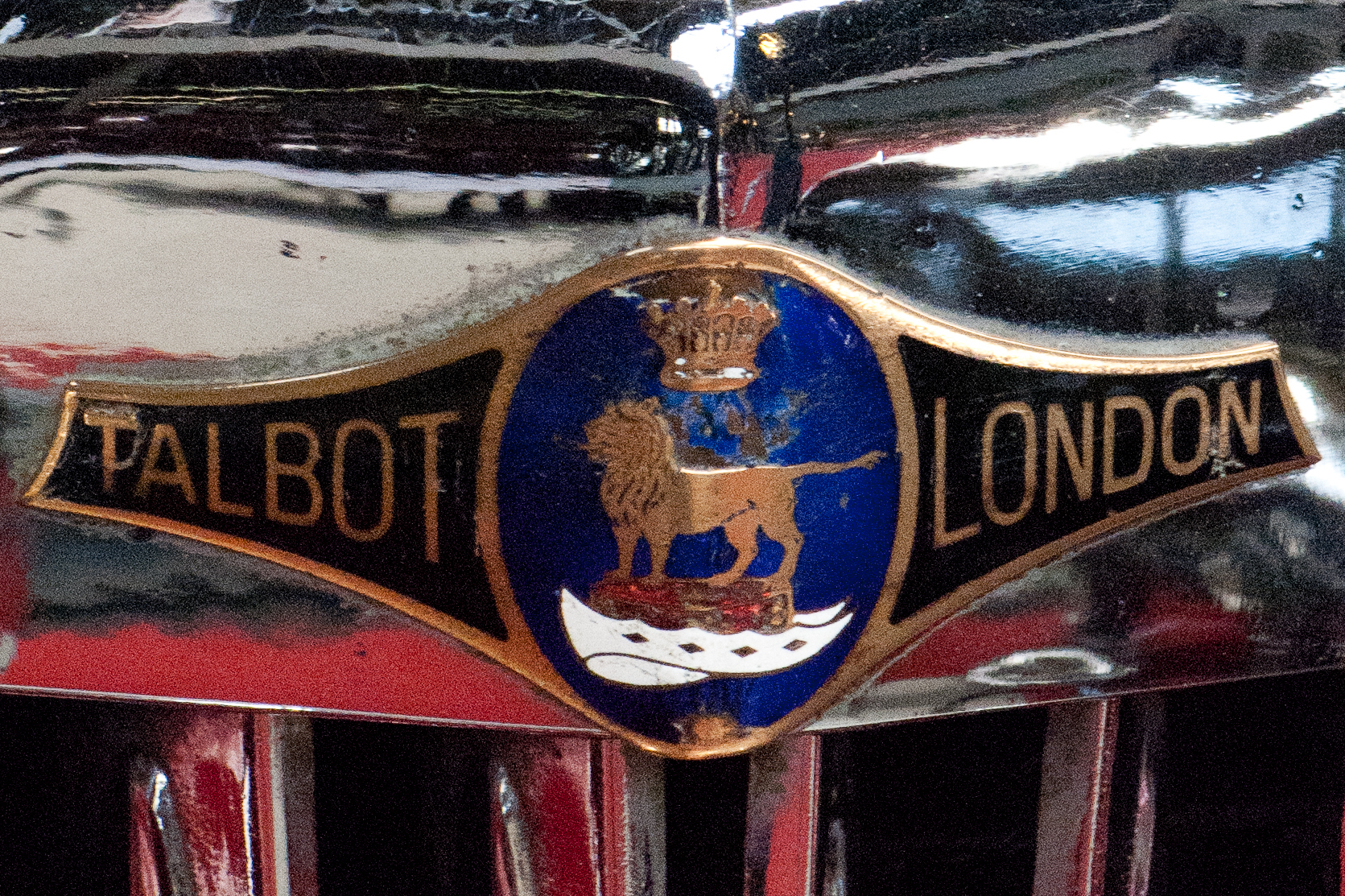

Name	Cylinders	Cubic capacity	Bore and stroke	Tax horsepower	Brake horsepower	Years in production
16	4	2614	80 x 130	15.9	—	1914–1915 1921–1921
36	6	3922	80 x 130	23.8	50	1915 1921–1921
14	4	1955	72 x 120	12.9	—	1921–1921
8-18	4	970	57 x 95	8	20	1922–1926
10-23	4	1074	60 x 95	8.9	23	1923–1926
12-30	6	1454	57 x 95	12	—	1922–1924
12-30	6	1612	60 x 95	13.4	30	1924–1924
16-50	6	2540	70 x 110	18.2	—	1924–1924
18-55	6	2540	70 x 110	18.2	—	1925–1925
14-45	6	1666	61 x 95	13.8	46	1926–1935
20-60	6	2916	75 x 110	20.9	—	1926–1928
18-70	6	2276	69.5 x 100	18	60	1930–1930
90	6	2276	69.5 x 100	18	93	1930–1937
75	6	2276	69.5 x 100	18	70	1931–1937
105	6	2969	75 x 112	20.9	100	1931–1937
65	6	1666	61 x 95	13.8	46	1932–1935
95	6	2969	75 x 112	20.9	95	1933–1936
110	6	3378	80 x 112	23.8	123	1935–1937
Eight	8	4504	80 x 112	31.7	150	1936–1936
10	4	1185	63 x 95	9.8	41	1936–1939
3-litre	6	3181	75 x 120	20.9	78	1937–1938

=== Some of the last true Talbots ===
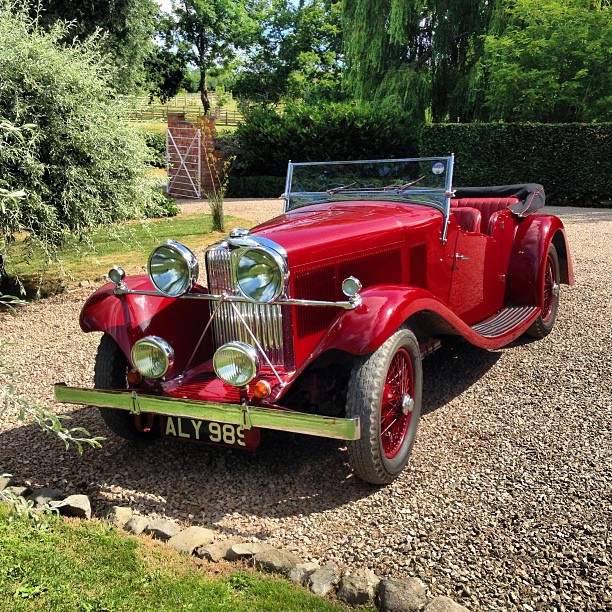
105 open tourer 1933

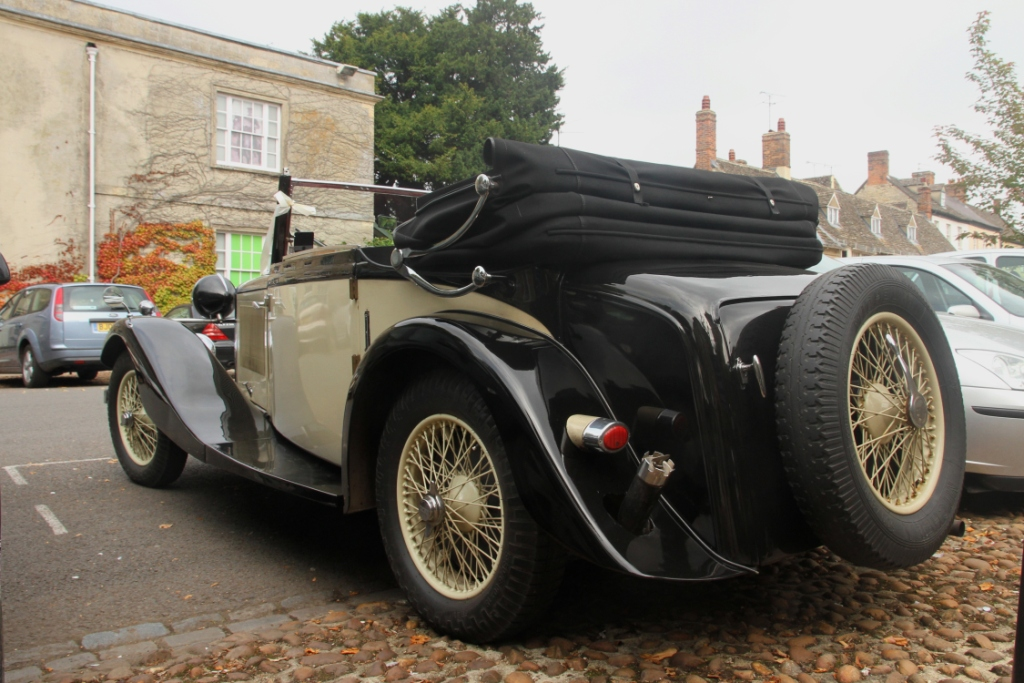
105 drophead coupé 1933

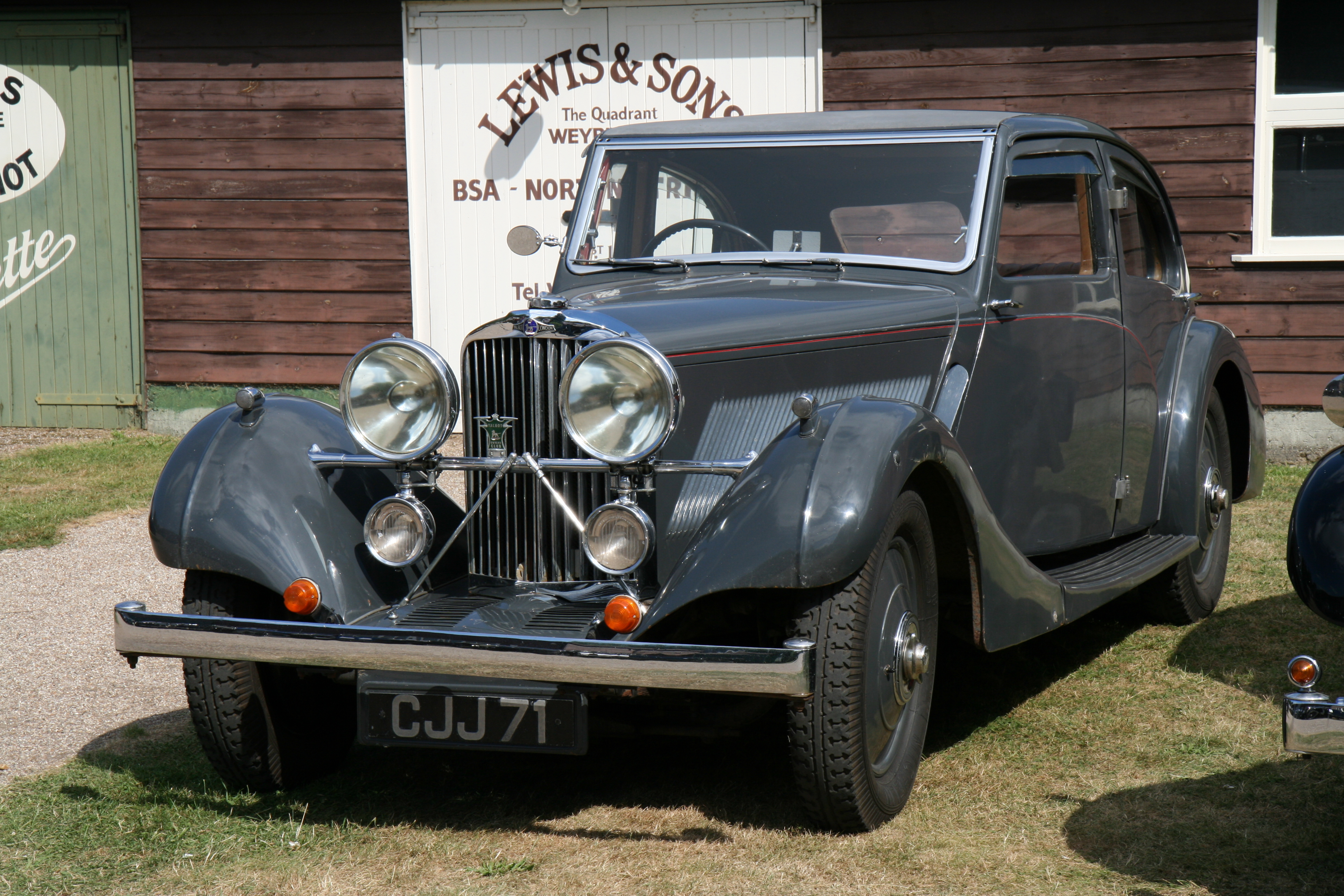
105 Airline 4-dr sports saloon 1935

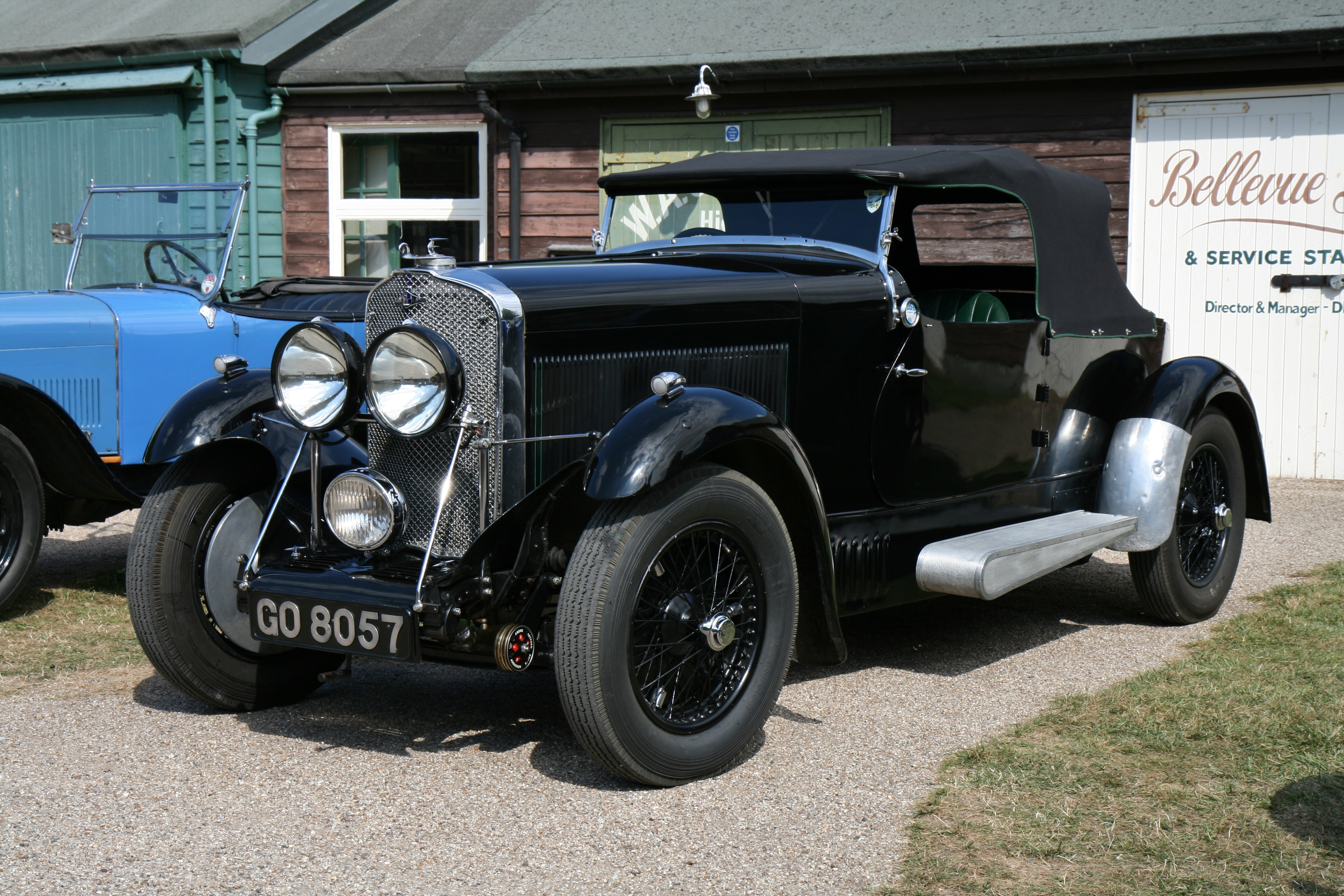
75-90 open tourer 1931

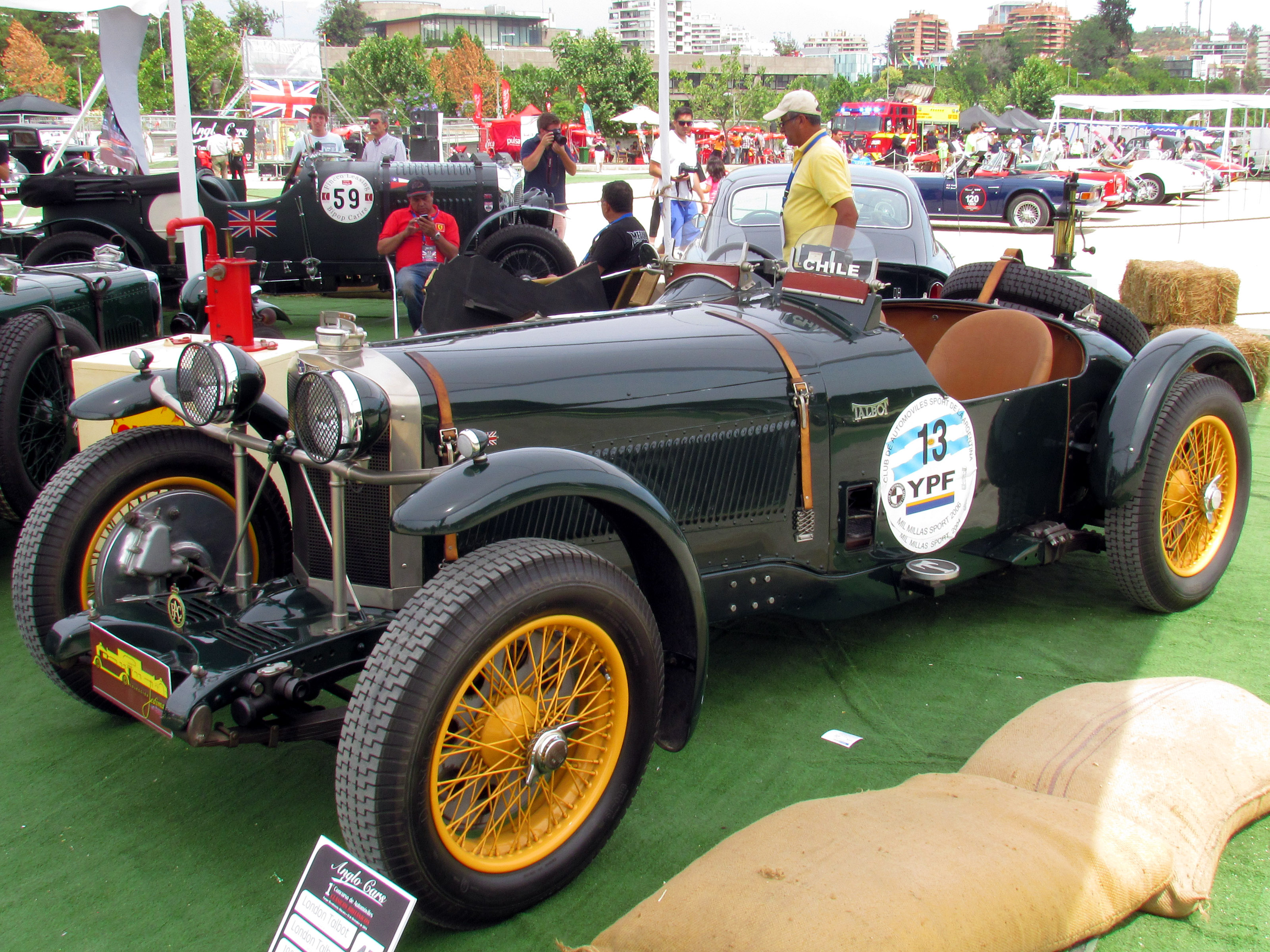
105 open 2-seater 1934

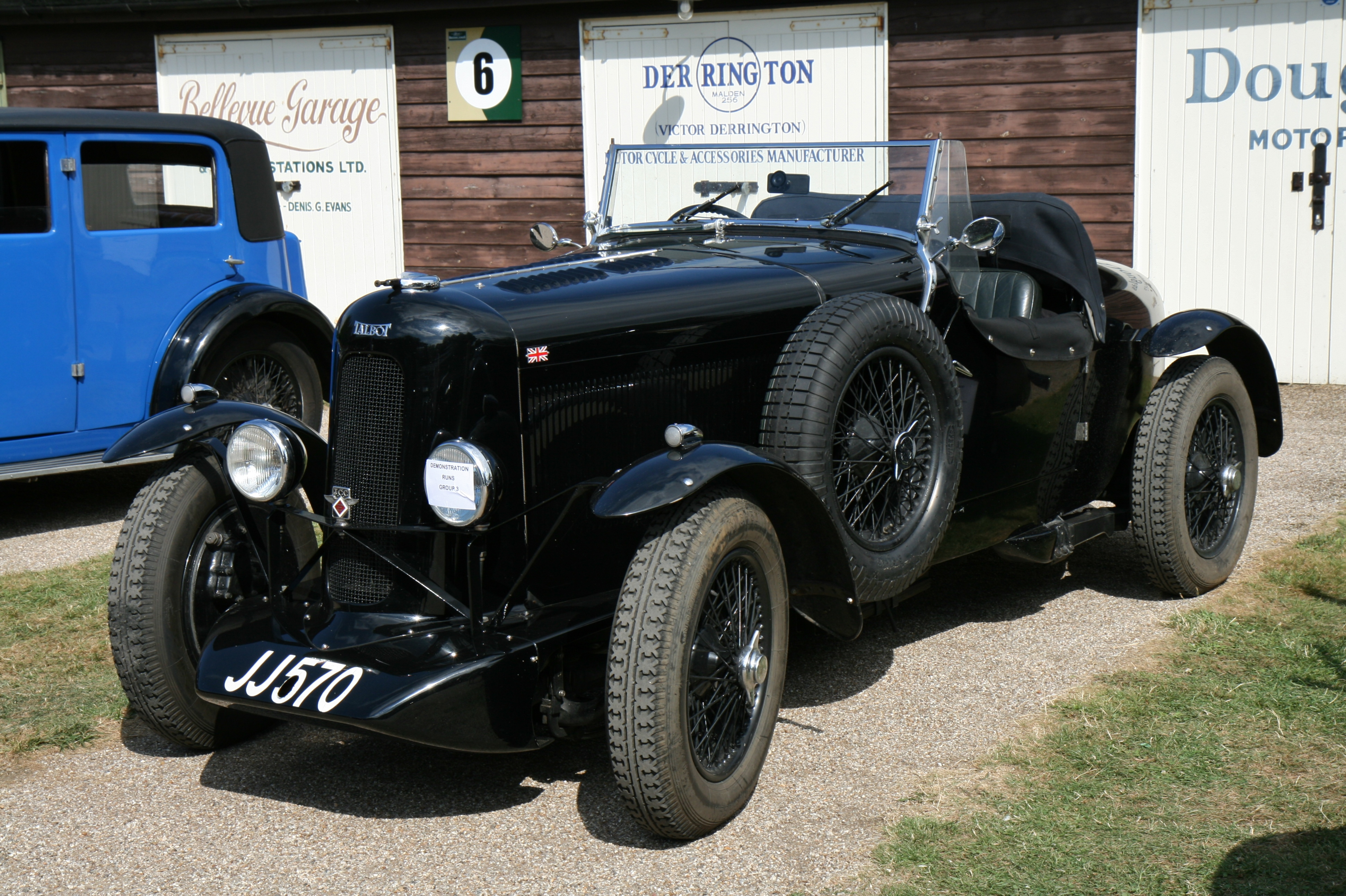
95/105 special open 2-seater 1937

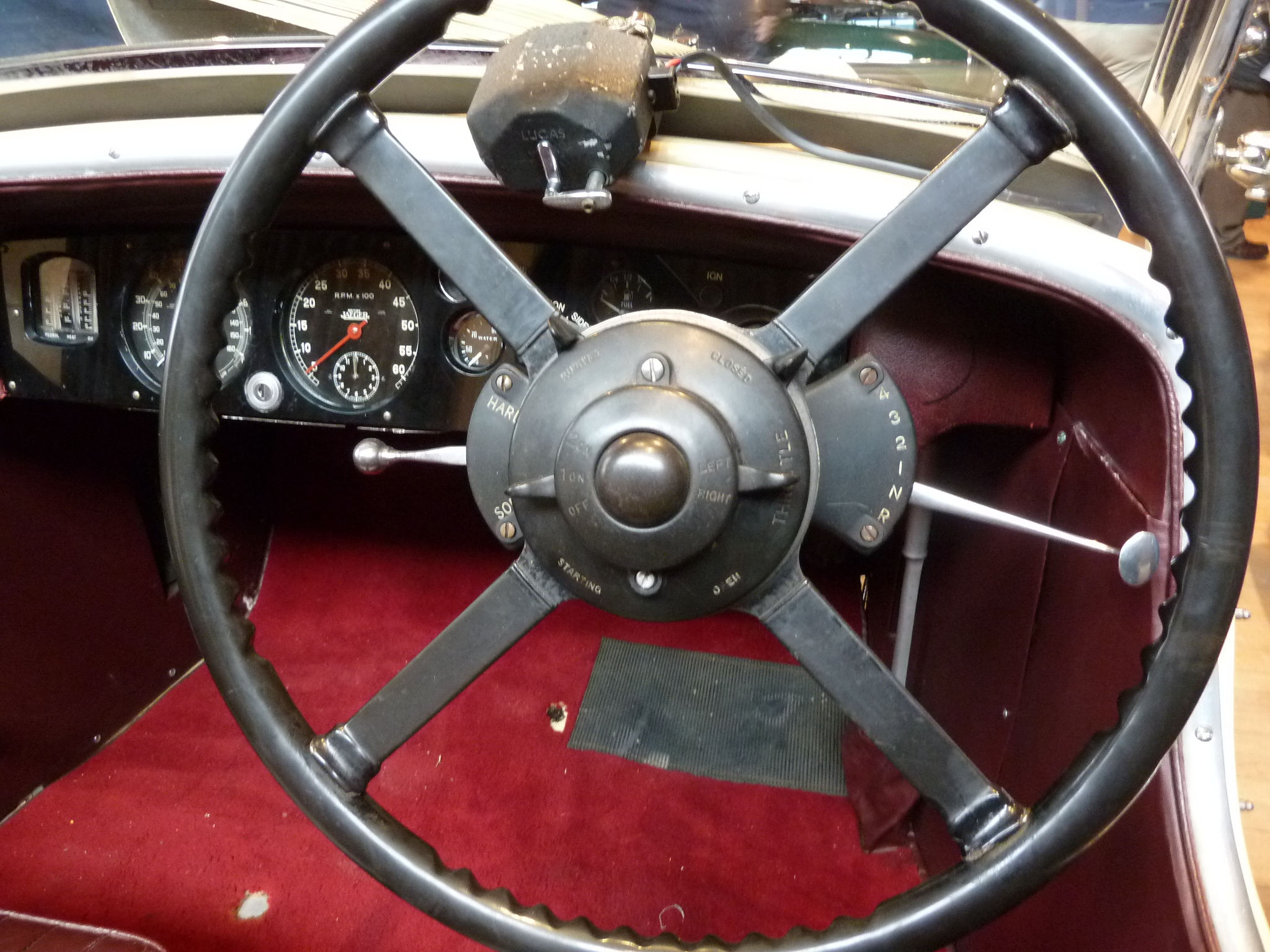
110 Instruments and controls 1933 note the flat floor

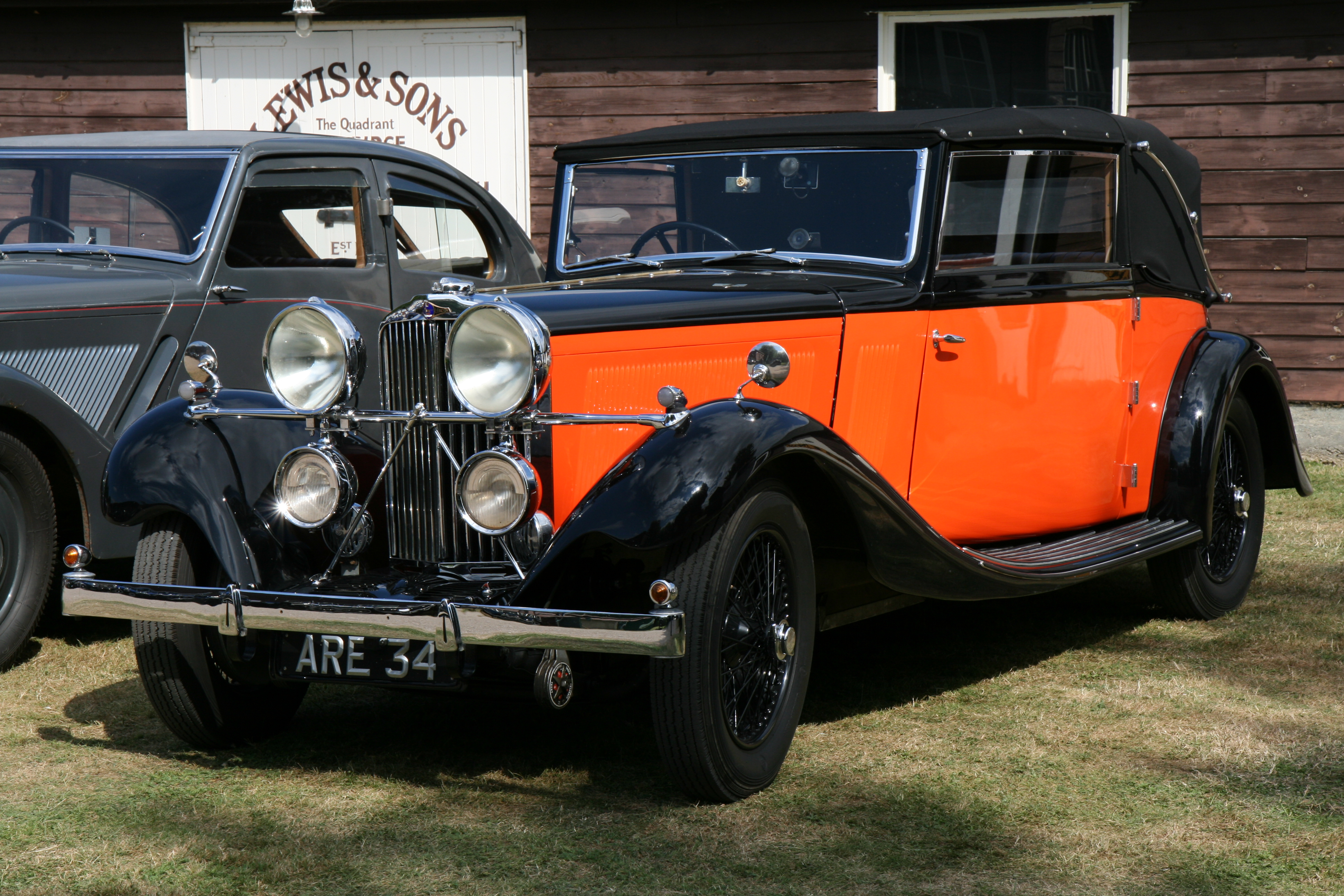
105 drophead coupé 1934 body by James Young

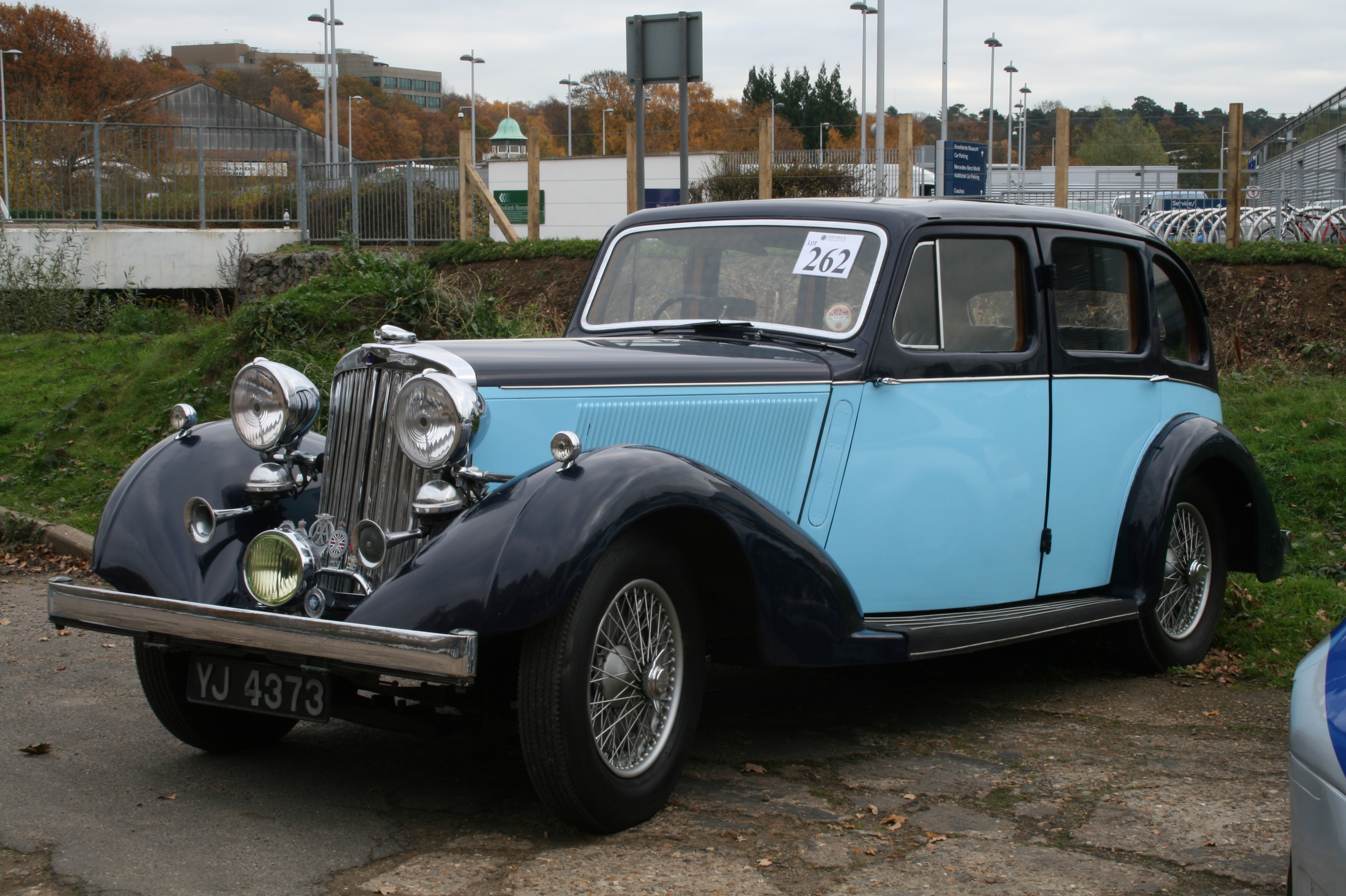
105 six-light saloon January 1937 note sloped Rootes radiator grille and neatly creased Humber mudguards
