= Talbot 14-45 =

Talbot 14-45; Talbot 65
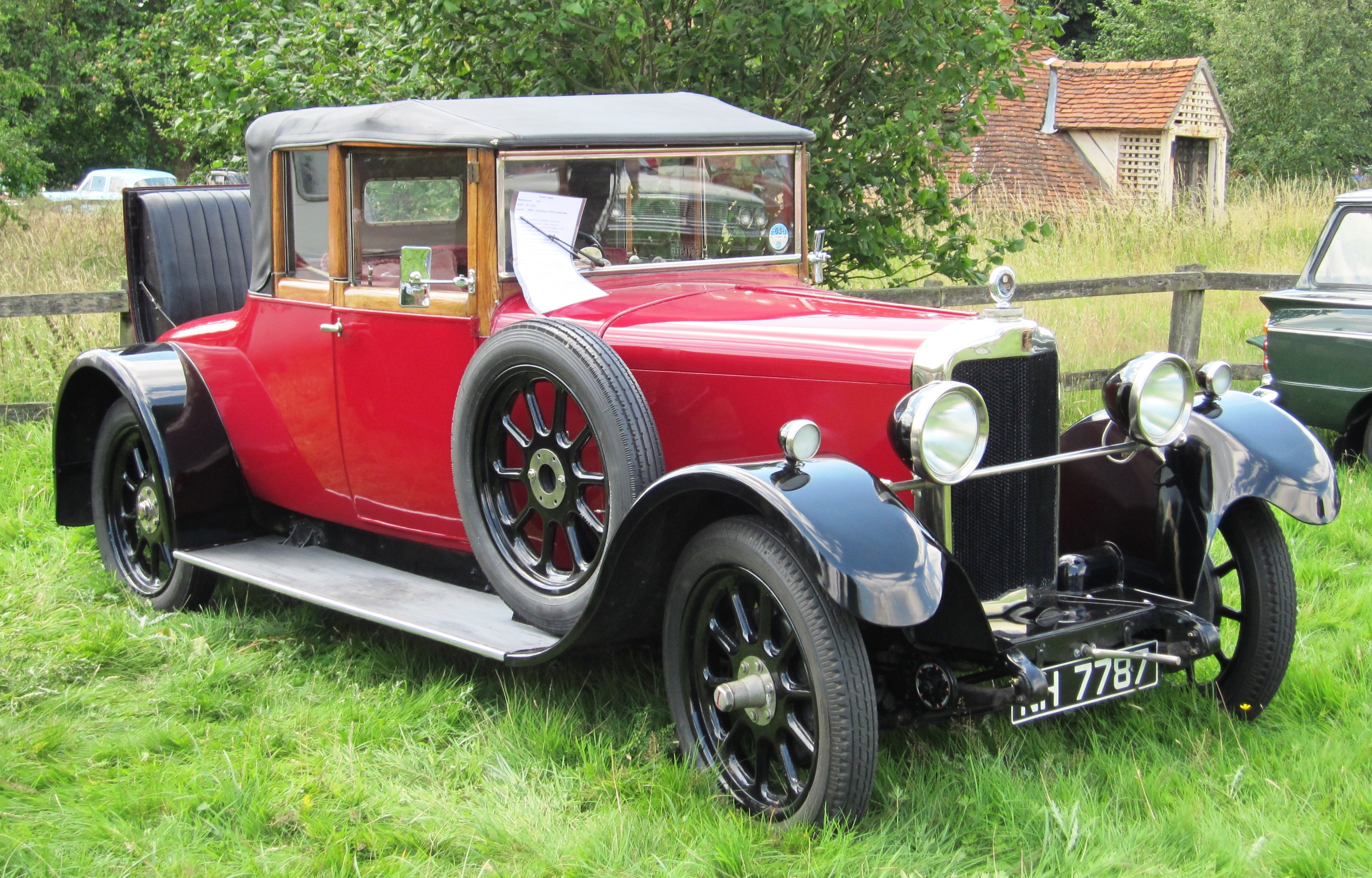
- 14-45 drophead coupé with dicky by (unknown) registered May 1927

Overview
- Manufacturer: Clément-Talbot Limited Kensington London W10
- Production: 14-45; AD Oct 1926–Oct 1927 2021; AF Oct 1927–Oct 1928 1999; AG Oct 1928–Oct 1931 2999; AQ Oct 1929–Spring 1932 1002; AU Oct 1931–Oct 1932 430; 65; AU65 Spring 1932–Oct 1932 320; AX65 Oct 1932–mid 1935 2080
- Model years: 1932–1935
- Assembly: North Kensington London
- Designer: Georges Roesch

Body and chassis
- Class: luxury
- Body style: coachbuilt saloon; Weymann fabric saloon; 2 or 3-seater with Dicky seat; 5-seater tourer; chassis for coach builder
- Layout: FR

Powertrain
- Engine: 1665 cc I6
- Transmission: AX preselector gearbox

Dimensions
- Wheelbase: 14-45 120 in (3,048 mm); AQ Scout 111 in (2,819 mm); 65 114 in (2,896 mm); Track 55.5 in (1,410 mm)
- Length: 175 in (4,445 mm)
- Width: 68.5 in (1,740 mm)
- Kerb weight: Saloon 23½ cwt, 2,632 lb (1,194 kg)

Chronology
- Predecessor: Talbot 12-30
- Successor: Talbot 75

- Designer: Georges Roesch

Layout
- Configuration: Straight 6-cylinder
- Displacement: 1,665 cc (101.6 cu in)
- Cylinder bore: 61 mm (2.40 in)
- Piston stroke: 95 mm (3.74 in)
- Cylinder block material: cast iron. 4-bearing disc-webbed crankshaft
- Cylinder head material: detachable
- Valvetrain: overhead valves

Combustion
- Fuel system: Smith's carburettor
- Cooling system: thermo-siphon, flywheel fan

Output
- Power output: from AD 41 bhp (31 kW; 42 PS) at 4,500 rpm; from AG 46 bhp (34 kW; 47 PS) at 4,500 rpm; from AU 48 bhp (36 kW; 49 PS) at 4,500 rpm; Tax horsepower 13.84

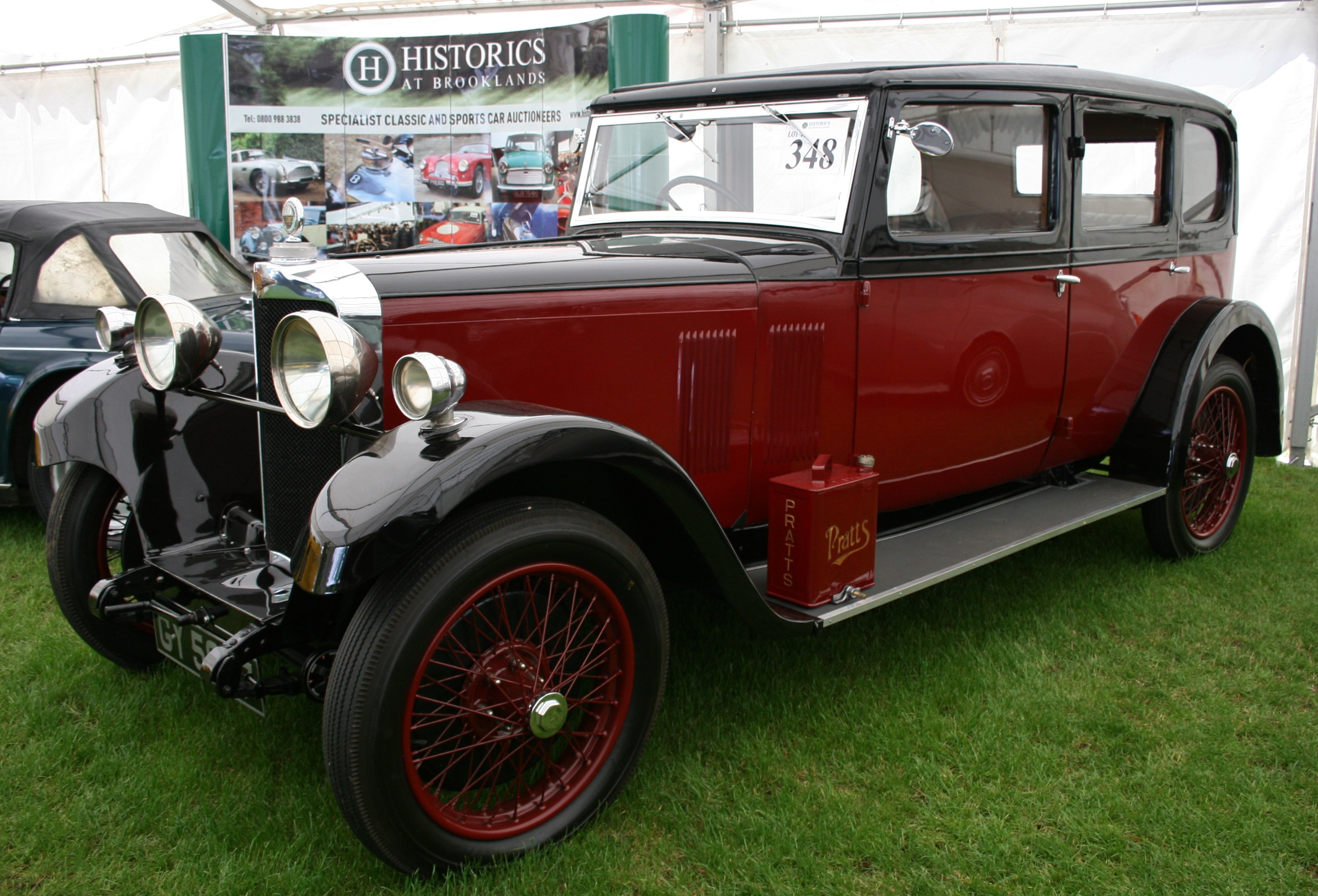
1932 Weymann fabric 6-light saloon

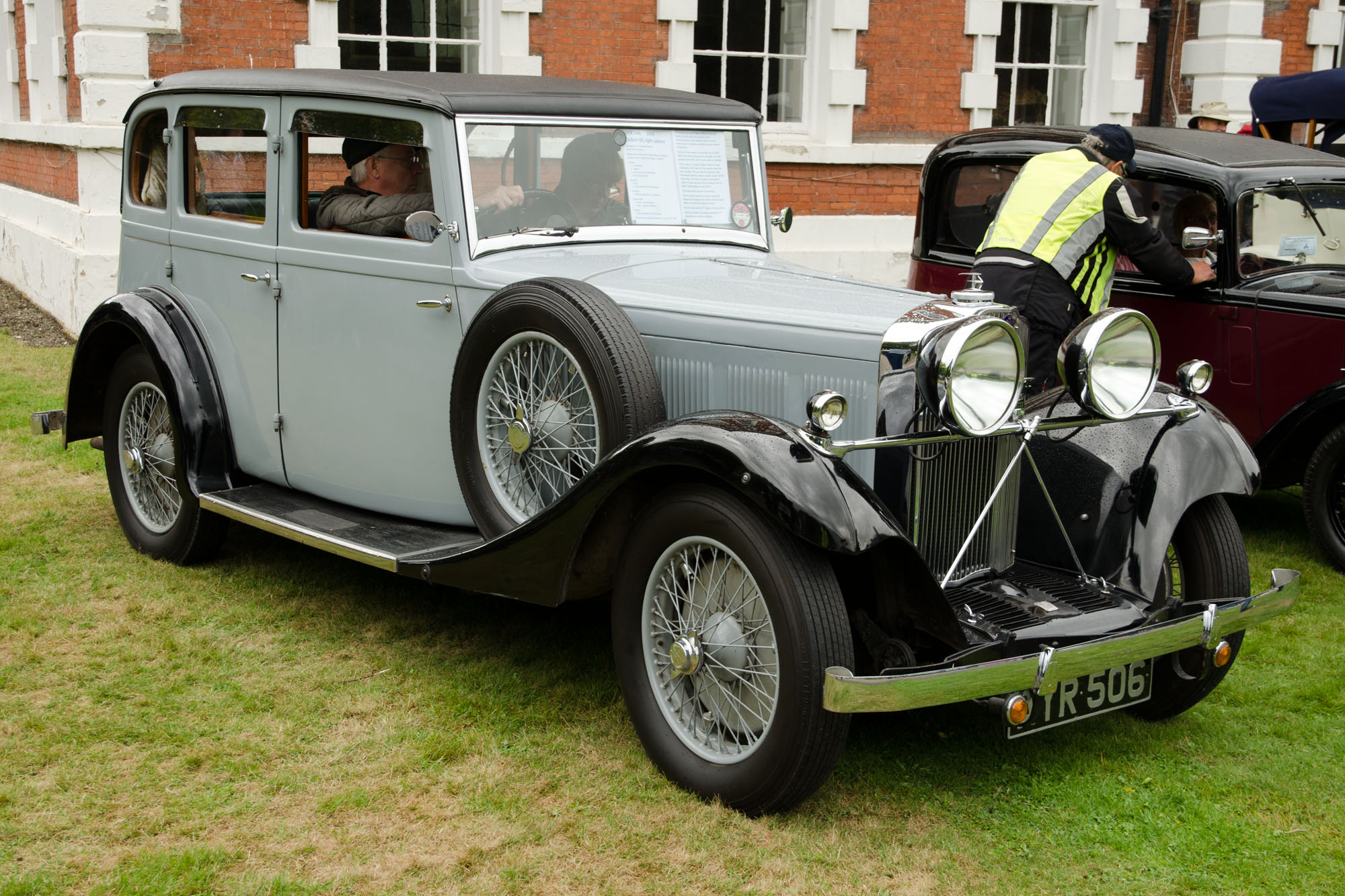
65 6-light saloon by STD's Darracq Motor Engineering of Fulham, London registered May 1934

The Talbot 14-45 also known as Talbot 65 is a luxury car designed by Georges Roesch and made by Clément Talbot Limited in their North Kensington factory, and usually bodied by fellow subsidiary of STD Motors, Darracq Motor Engineering, in Fulham. The car made its first appearance at the London Motor Show in 1926.

== Engine ==
The six-cylinder engine displaces 1,665 cc. The inlet and exhaust manifolds are bolted together and fitted to the left hand side of the block with the 5-jet carburettor bolted to the front end of the inlet manifold. Petrol is delivered from a vacuum tank on the dash supplied from a 14-gallon tank at the back of the car. The overhead valves are operated by pushrods with double valve springs. The rockers must be kept in position if the detachable cylinder head is to be removed. There is forced lubrication throughout the engine. All six cylinders are cast in one piece along with the top half of the crankcase.

Sparking plugs, distributor and contacts are on the right side of the engine block. Ignition advance and retard is entirely automatic. A dynamotor (combined dynamo and starter motor) is fitted at the front end of the crankshaft. Engine timing (camshaft) is turned by gear from the crankshaft

Cooling water passes through a honeycomb radiator and the airflow is assisted by a fan embodied in the engine's flywheel. Circulation is by thermo-siphon there is no water-pump.

Clutch and gearbox are bolted firmly to the engine block, gears are changed by a lever beside the driver's right hand operating in a gate. The clutch is not fully enclosed. Drive is carried to the rear axle by an enclosed propeller shaft. Spherical and universal joints are automatically oiled, there is a central bearing in the torque tube. Final drive is by spiral bevel and the axle is of the half-floating design.

== Brakes suspension steering ==
Steering is by a worm and nut system, its box raised to give a comfortable rake to the steering wheel. There are just the four brakes, one on each wheel. They are not compensated. The brakes are operated by rods. There is a hand lever by the driver's right which controls the rear brakes alone. The aluminium brake shoes are adjusted for wear by a wedge which opens or closes a fulcrum on one end of the shoe. The brake drums are enclosed.

The springs are quarter-elliptical each with a shackle at its rear. At the front of the car they are set without camber, held out of centre and slightly inclined to the rear and are fitted with snubber leaves. Shock absorbers are fitted all round.

== On the road ==
When trying out this relatively expensive 5-seater tourer the correspondent of The Times reported he thought the car's design had much to recommend it but could be improved. A four-door five-seat car it is comfortable but the front cushion tends to obstruct the front door. The seat is adjustable. He noted the test car had already travelled 8,000 miles. Its high-speed type engine with only four bearings, he said, is remarkably smooth, it runs sweetly up to 4,000 rpm yet picks up easily in top from almost a standstill. Over 55 mph increased speed takes time to build. The indirect gears were noisy. Except for some clutch slip when climbing hills under a heavy load all controls worked well and smoothly. He also reported that the suspension let the car bounce too much suggesting slacker tyres and softer shock absorbers might be a useful improvement.

== Georges Roesch's high-speed engine ==
The 14-45 was designed and put into production at short notice. Clément-Talbot was no longer profitable, their cars were not selling. The board of directors established a one-model policy. In the autumn of 1925 Roesch began to contemplate suitable designs. His difficulties included the outmoded plant and machinery at his disposal so he involved all employees right to the shop floor.

Six months later in the spring of 1926 he took his detailed proposal to Louis Coatalen, chief engineer of Clément-Talbot's parent company S T D Motors and designer of then current Talbot 12-30. Roesch wanted to build a car as good as Rolls-Royce's Twenty but of half the engine size and for quarter of the Twenty's price. He foresaw his greatest difficulty would be to achieve the desired refinement for the price. An important part of the design was the development of a sufficiently powerful engine. To accomplish this the new engine was to run at higher speeds and higher compression than ever before. Roesch's design was striking for its simplicity and economy.

Part of Roesch's solution was the use of then unfashionable (noisy, unreliable) overhead valves with pushrod actuation allowing smaller combustion chambers and, with that, higher compression. Otherwise much of the six-cylinder engine and chassis had the dimensions and shapes of the old four-cylinder Talbot 12-30. In fact little remained unchanged following Roesch's careful revision. It even extended to a revised (cheaper to build) classic Talbot radiator shape. Everything had been revised and reworked. The new engine was designed to produce maximum useful output at 4,500 rpm whereas with the 12-30 maximum output was reached at just 3,000 rpm. To save Clément-Talbot's business the whole new vehicle had to be reliable.

An extra bearing was added to the crankshaft and careful detail design ensured greater strength in all the new crankshaft's characteristics. The new pistons were not aluminium but were in two parts, a crown of Y-alloy and a skirt of low-expansion iron. The combined piston weighed much less than an all aluminium piston because it was shorter and the short piston allowed shorter connecting rods and a shorter lighter engine. The new pushrods were the thickness of fencing wire and were intended to be made by knitting needle manufacturers. The short stiff rockers were to Roesch's own design. The cam followers were new style with a large rubbing surface in place of the old heavy mushroom shapes.

The new engine had no belt or chain drives. The camshaft was driven by a special gear made of a fibrous material known as fabroil. Control of ignition was made automatic using the Delco-Remy system designed for relatively heavy slow-revving American engines adapted by arranging twin contact-breakers and lifting the system's voltage from six to twelve volts. The oil distribution was improved by running the same pump by another fabroil gear from the crankshaft instead of the half-speed camshaft. Generous water passages reached all hotspots and such items as pushrods were not allowed to obstruct the flow in any way. The return water pipe to the radiator was considered particularly vast. No water pump was provided. The engine was bolted securely directly to the frame in front and to a cross member at the back of the block.
