= Volanis =

Volanis is a surname. Notable people with the surname include:

- Antonis Volanis (born 1948), Greek industrial designer
- Sotis Volanis (born 1971), Greek singer
