= Matra Bagheera =

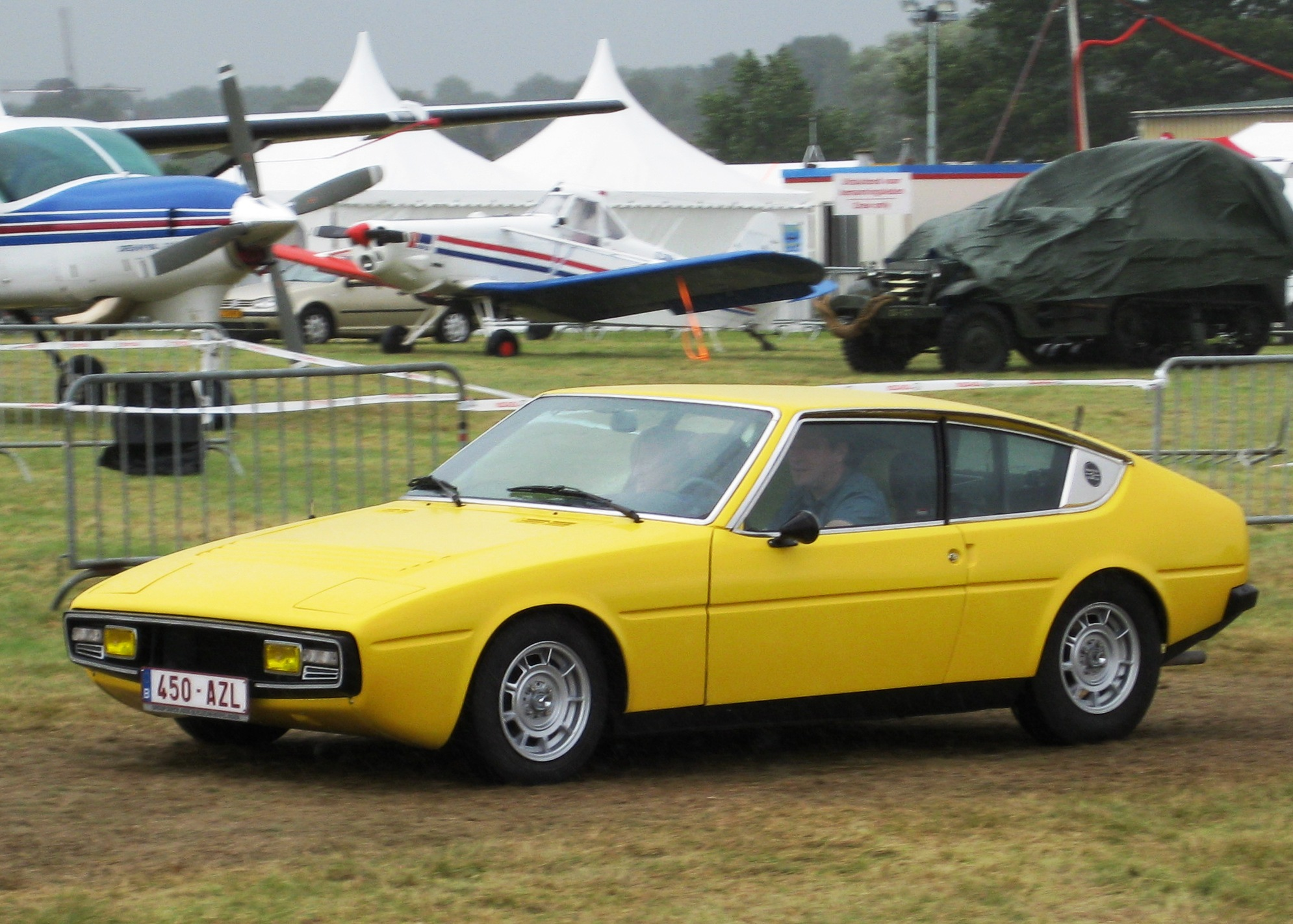

Overview
- Manufacturer: Matra Automobiles
- Also called: Matra-Simca Bagheera; Talbot-Matra Bagheera
- Production: 1973–1980
- Assembly: France: Romorantin-Lanthenay
- Designer: Jean Toprieux; Jacques Nochet; Antonis Volanis

Body and chassis
- Class: Sports car
- Body style: 3-door hatchback
- Layout: MR layout
- Related: Simca 1100 Ti

Powertrain
- Engine: 1294 cc Poissy engine ohv I4; 1442 cc Poissy engine ohv I4
- Transmission: 4-speed manual all-synchromesh

Dimensions
- Wheelbase: 2,370 mm (93 in)
- Length: 3,974 mm (156.5 in)
- Width: 1,734 mm (68.3 in)
- Height: 1,175 mm (46.3 in)
- Curb weight: 965 kg (2,127 lb)

Chronology
- Predecessor: Matra 530
- Successor: Matra Murena

The Matra Bagheera is a sports car built by the automotive division of the French engineering group Matra from 1973 to 1980, in cooperation with automaker Simca. It was marketed as the Matra-Simca Bagheera until its final year of production, when its designation was changed to the Talbot-Matra Bagheera following Chrysler Europe's demise and subsequent takeover by PSA.

== Conception and development ==
In December 1969 Matra and Simca entered into an agreement that rebranded Matra's racing cars as Matra-Simcas and give Matra access to the Simca dealer network in France and the Common Market. The first joint project of the new liaison was development of a replacement for the Matra 530, which had not reached either its targeted market or its projected sales volumes.

Work on the new car began in 1970 under project code M550. Development was led by Matra's head of engineering and design Philippe Guédon and Chrysler-Simca product planner Jacques Rousseau. Additional direction for the design was provided by Chrysler-Simca planner Marc Honoré. Honoré identified Simca's strongest market as being cars displacing between 1.3 and 1.5 litres and suggested the team focus on building a car of that class, which would constrain the size of the car if performance was to be acceptable. As many as possible of the major components were sourced from the Chrysler-Simca parts inventory. Although the engine, gearbox and many suspension elements came directly from the Simca 1100, this new Matra was to be a mid-engined car rather than front-wheel drive like the donor car.

Chrysler-Simca's planners also wanted a car with more than just two seats. Guédon agreed, but he was also not satisfied with the 2+2 arrangement used in the M530, feeling that the rear seats were too small to be really useful. The solution came to him on a lengthy trip he took in a Ford Taunus station wagon with two colleagues. The back of the car was so full that the travelers sat three across in the front of the car. The M550 sat three abreast.

Eleven prototypes were built and used for road-testing in environments ranging from Saharan Mauritania to Lapland, as well as for crash-testing. Development was complete by the end of 1972. The car was built in Matra's factory in the commune of Romorantin-Lanthenay in the department of Loir-et-Cher in central France. Rather than being sold under its development code name, the car took its name from the character in Rudyard Kipling's The Jungle Book.

The Bagheera was unveiled to the press at an event held at Lake Annecy on April 14, 1973. The public release of the car took place at the 1973 24 Heures du Mans. At the same time Simca had arranged to have 500 yellow Bagheeras available at their dealers across France. Towards the end of 1973, production levels had reached 65 cars per day. In June 1974, within eighteen months of its release, more than 10,000 Bagheeras had been sold.

== Bodywork ==
The initial shape of the car was drawn by Jean Toprieux and later refined by Jacques Nochet. Greek designer Antonis Volanis joined the project and contributed to the interior, handling the instrument panel and steering wheel shapes.

The body's shape was that of a sleek hatchback with hidden headlights. The rear hatch opened to access the engine mounted behind the passenger compartment and a rear luggage space. The unusual three-abreast seating dictated by Guédon was implemented as a 2+1 arrangement. The driver had a regular seat while on the passenger side was a single two-place bench with two individual seatbacks inspired by a lounge chair Guédon had found in a Paris shop. Seen in plan view it is apparent that the body sides are slightly convex to accommodate the seating.

The 19 panels that made up the Bagheera's body were made of fiberglass-reinforced polyester, which were then attached to the chassis. The process used to make the panels was called `LP', and it used a low-pressure high-temperature pressing method to produce panels using relatively inexpensive tooling. The advantages of using LP for Matra were its ability to produce large, high quality panels with precision and economy. The LP process had only been in use for twelve month prior to the beginning of production, which means that Matra had introduced this new technology at the car's early development stage. Problems with the car's finish served to hamper sales when new, and in 1975 the Bagheera received German ADAC's "Silver Lemon" award for being the new car with the most problems.

The Bagheera won the 1973 Style Auto Award, beating out competition that included the Lancia Stratos, Lancia Beta coupé and Ferrari Dino 308 GT4.

The Bagheera was also very aerodynamic, with a drag coefficient ($\scriptstyle C_\mathrm d\,$) of 0.33 for the early models. This rose slightly to 0.35 after a mid-life redesign.

== Chassis and suspension ==
The chassis was fabricated of pressed steel. While it has been called a space-frame it more closely resembled a unitary body. The shapes of some pieces were simplified to accommodate the low production numbers that the car was built in.

The front suspension was from the Simca 1100. It consisted of upper and lower A-arms with telescopic hydraulic dampers and longitudinal torsion bars running back along the chassis for springing. An anti-roll bar was fitted at the front as well.

The rear of the M550 prototype used the same type of suspension as the front, moved rearward along with the engine and transaxle. This proved unsatisfactory and so the final production cars received a new system that comprised new trailing arms designed by Matra with transverse torsion bars and telescopic shock-absorbers. An anti-roll bar was also fitted at the rear.

No right-hand-drive Bagheeras were ever built by the factory, but a number were converted to RHD by Wooler-Hodec in England.

== Engine and transaxle ==
The only engine offered at first was the 1,294 cc (79.0 cu in) "Poissy engine" from Simca's 1100 Ti model. In the Bagheera this ohv straight-4 engine developed 62.6 kW (84 hp) at 6000 rpm, two more horsepower than in the 1100 Ti. The transversely mounted engine was paired with the 4-speed manual transaxle from the 1100.

In 1976 a larger version of the same engine became available when the 1,442 cc (88.0 cu in) engine from the Simca 1308 GT was added to the lineup. The first Bagheera to use this engine was the newly introduced `S' version. Changes were also made to the carburation. A 4-speed manual was still the only transmission offered.

== Model variations ==
- 1973 - The Bagheera was released as a 1974 model-year car. This version had the original bodywork and 1294 cc engine with two two-barrel Weber carburetors. Although not an official designation, this model was often called the type I.

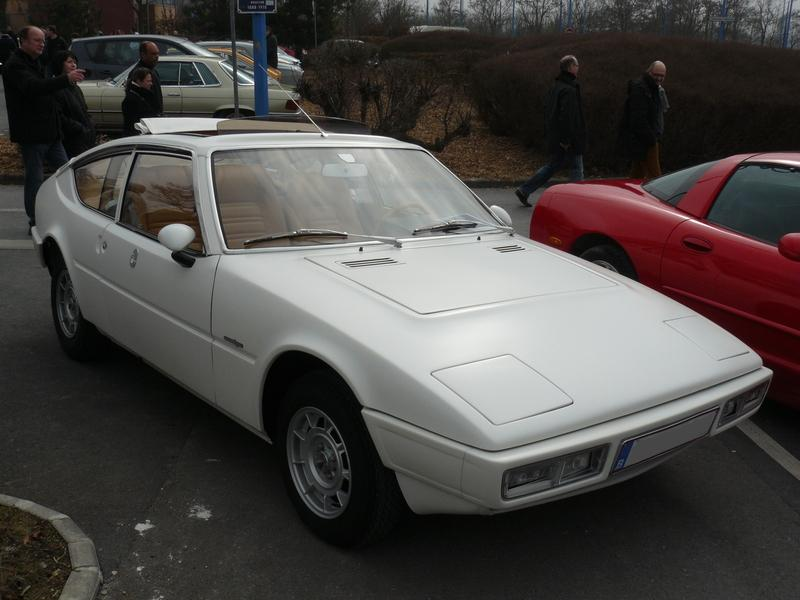
Bagheera Courrèges

- 1974 - `Courrèges' model was launched. While mechanically identical to the Mark I this version, styled by fashion designer André Courrèges, had an all-white exterior and interior and dash trimmed in imitation gold. Apart from the colour it was distinguished by custom exterior badging and custom interior trim.
- 1975 - `Bagheera S' model was launched. This car got the larger 1,442 cc (88.0 cu in) engine from the Simca 1308 GT, as did the Courrèges the same year. With two two-barrel carburetors the engine produced 67.1 kW (90 hp). The `S' was also distinguished by special exterior trim and badging.
- 1976 - The Bagheera received a major restyling. All body panels with the exception of the rear hatch were modified at least slightly. Most obvious were the new wrap-around bumpers, the new rear-quarter glass and the larger tail lamps. The changes raised the drag coefficient to 0.35. Inside there was a new dashboard. This model was now referred to by some as the type II. The base engine remained at 1294 cc, while both the `S' and the Courrèges continued with the 1442 cc engine as standard.
- 1977 - The Courrèges model was dropped, and a new, fully optioned "Bagheera X" model took its place.
- 1978 - All models received a new dashboard and seats. In April a new "Jubilé" series was launched to commemorate Simca's second "Car of the Year" win for the Horizon in 1978. Since PSA took control of Simca in the previous year (after the demise of Chrysler Europe), all Matra-Simcas became Talbot-Matras.
- 1979 - The 1294 engine was dropped and all Bagheeras got the 1442 cc engine but with variations in carburation. New doors and handles from the Rancho replaced the previously `hidden' door handles. This necessitated a change to the rear quarter of the car. The `S' was dropped from the lineup and only the base model and the `X' model were available.
- 1980 - Production of the Bagheera ended in April 1980 with 47,802 having been built in total. It was succeeded by the Matra Murena.

== Road tests and impressions ==
Early in 1974 the German Magazine Auto, Motor und Sport tested a 1294 cc Bagheera and compared it to its closest competitors in the market. The car's light weight served it well in the performance comparisons: a top speed of 186.5 km/h (116 mph) was recorded against 176.5 km/h (110 mph) for an Alfa Romeo GT 1300 Junior, despite the Alfa's claim of an extra 3 bhp. The French car's acceleration also bettered the Italian's, taking 12.2 seconds to reach 100 km/h (62 mph) against the Alfa's 13.5 seconds. The Matra-Simca's DM 14,198 price tag was somewhat lower than the DM 14,490 listed for the Alfa Romeo, although both were undercut on price by models from mass market producers such as the 1900 cc Opel Manta SR at DM 13,990.

== Longevity ==
The Bagheera won the ADAC Silberne Zitrone ("Silver Lemon") award in 1975 for the poorest quality car at the time. Complaints ranged from a leaky body that allowed rain to enter the cabin to mechanical failures. Many Bagheeras suffered from extensive corrosion of the steel chassis. While the polyester body panels do not rust, the problem was caused by the underlying steel chassis having almost no corrosion protection. Matra learned from this and fully galvanized the chassis of the Bagheera's successor, the Matra Murena.

== The Bagheera U8 ==
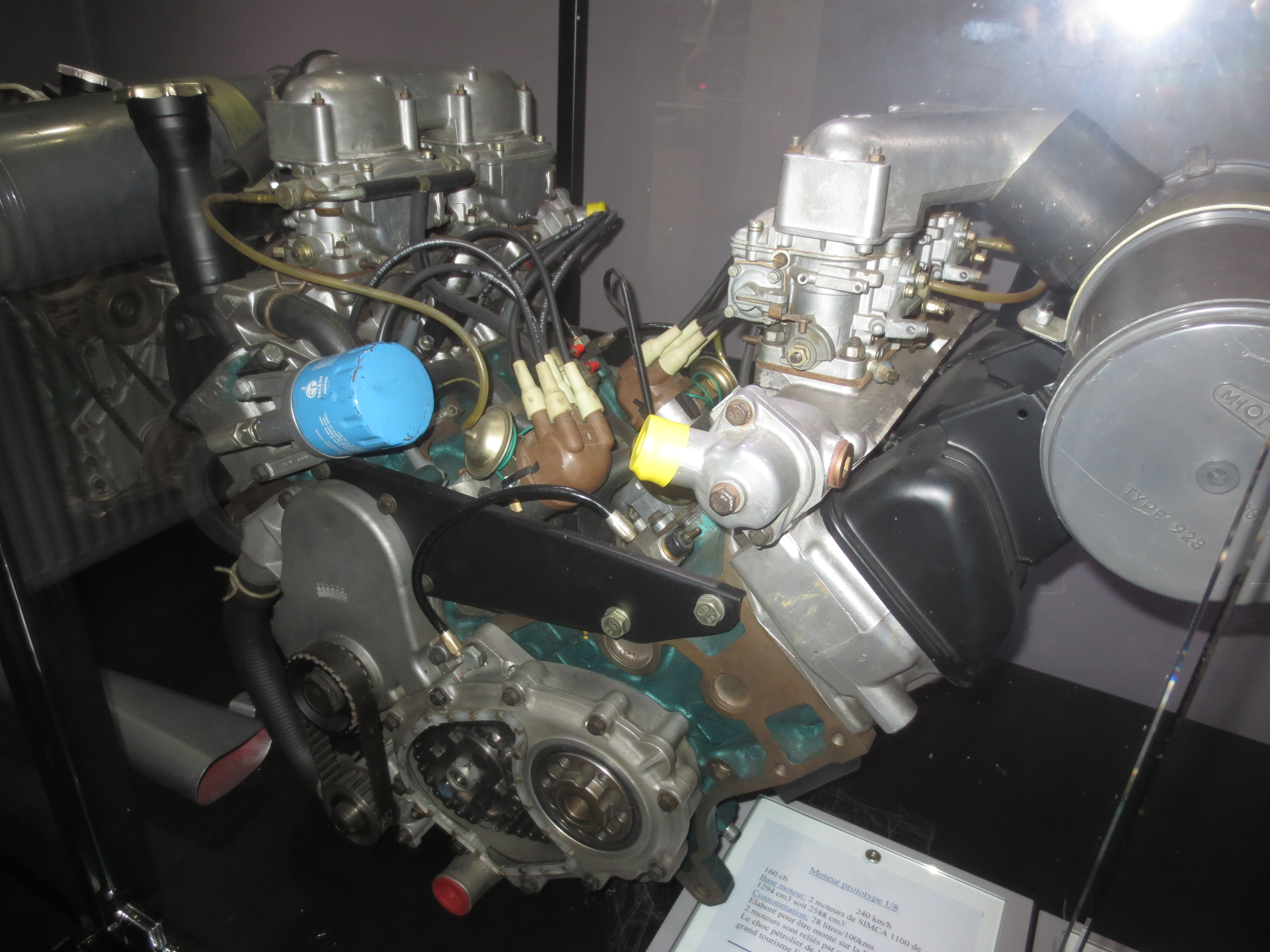
Prototype U8 engine

In March 1973 a team of Matra engineers led by Georges Pinardaud completed the initial design for project M560, which was to be a more powerful Bagheera. A key part of the project was the creation of a unique "U engine" out of two existing Simca straight-4 engines. The blocks came from two different Simca applications and rotated in opposite directions but shared the same 1294 cc displacement. One block was from the 1100Ti and was adapted to transverse mounting while the other was from the Simca 1000 Rallye II in which it had been mounted longitudinally. The two blocks were joined at an 82° angle using a common cast-aluminum sump that also carried a common oil supply for the engine. At the non-drive end another aluminum casting assured the alignment of the blocks while at the drive end a steel adapter fit the ends of both crankshafts. A sprocket and Morse chain from each crankshaft were connected to a 22.9 mm (0.9 in) shaft running down the middle of the sump that transmitted power from the left-hand crank to the right. Each block retained its own crankshaft, distributor, and water pump. The clutch and bell-housing of the engine from the Rallye II engine provided the transaxle mounting while a flywheel was only mounted to the 1100Ti crankshaft. The resulting 2,588 cc (157.9 cu in) 8-cylinder assembly was fitted with four Weber 36 DCNF carburetors and, with a 9.8:1 compression ratio, produced 126 kW (169.0 hp) at 6200 rpm and 216 N⋅m (159.3 lb⋅ft) at 4000 rpm.

The car required modifications to accept the new engine. Additional air-intakes were let into the sides of the car ahead of the rear wheels. The overall length rose by 431.8 mm (17 in) and the wheelbase rose by 230 mm (9.1 in). Overall width increased by 20 mm (0.8 in) due to the addition of larger wheel arches added to clear wider tires, which were 185/70 VR14s at the front and 205/70 VR14s at the rear. The front suspension was unchanged from the original but at the rear suspension was now by lateral links, trailing arms, and coil springs. The car also received ventilated disk brakes and 5-lug wheels. The first prototype used a modified production chassis, while subsequent prototypes used a chassis made of tubular steel. The engine was mounted longitudinally behind the driver and drove the wheels through a Porsche 5-speed transaxle. Due to the output shaft being offset 127.0 mm (5 in) to the right the half-shafts were of unequal lengths. Top speed for the car was reported to have been 232 km/h (144.2 mph).

Even though the project was announced in the autumn of 1973, said to be production ready by 1974, and survived until 1975, Chrysler Europe was unwilling to approve the project due to the developing fuel crises as well as its own financial problems. Thus, the U8-powered Bagheera remained a prototype with only three units ever built. A surviving prototype and engine are in the Matra museum at Romorantin-Lanthenay.

== Information ==
Model	Bagheera (I)	Bagheera (II)	Bagheera S	Bagheera Courrèges		Bagheera X and Jubilé
Years of Production	July 1973 to September 1976 (until September 1978 in France)	September 1976 to April 1980 (until September 1978 in France)	June 1975 to September 1979	September 1974 to June 1975	June 1975 to August 1977	August 1977 to April 1980 (Jubilé from March 79)
Units produced	45,605			661		1,440
Engine	Type 3G4	Type 6Y2	Type 6Y4	Type 3G4	Type 6Y4	
Position	Rear-mid engine, transverse					
Number and arrangement of cylinders	4 cylinders inline					
Bore x stroke (mm)	76.7 x 70	76.7 x 78		76.7 x 70	76.7 x 78	
Displacement	1,294 cc (79.0 cu in)	1,442 cc (88.0 cu in)		1,294 cc (79.0 cu in)	1,442 cc (88.0 cu in)	
Carburation	Two two-barrel Weber 36 DCNF 17-18 carburetors	One two-barrel Weber 36 DCNV carburetor	Two two-barrel Weber 36 DCNF 51-52 carburetors	Two two-barrel Weber 36 DCNF carburetors		
Maximum power	62.6 kW (84 hp) @ 6200 rpm	62.6 kW (84 hp) @ 5600 rpm	67.1 kW (90 hp) @ 5800 rpm	62.6 kW (84 hp) @ 6200 rpm	67.1 kW (90 hp) @ 5800 rpm	
Maximum torque	108 N⋅m (79.7 lb⋅ft) @ 4000 rpm	124 N⋅m (91.5 lb⋅ft) @ 3000 rpm	122 N⋅m (90.0 lb⋅ft) @ 3250 rpm	108 N⋅m (79.7 lb⋅ft) @ 4000 rpm	122 N⋅m (90.0 lb⋅ft) @ 3250 rpm	
Driven wheels	Rear					
Transmission	4-speed manual					
Clutch	Single dry plate with hydraulic actuation					
Chassis	Steel space-frame/unibody with bonded fiberglass body panels					
Front suspension	Independent with upper and lower A-arms, longitudinal torsion bars, double-acting hydraulic shock-absorbers, and anti-roll bar.					
Rear suspension	Independent with trailing arms, transverse torsion bars, double-acting hydraulic shock-absorbers and anti-roll bar.					
Braking	4-wheel disk brakes with 238 mm fixed caliper front and 234 mm floating caliper rear					
Steering	Rack and pinion					
Tires	Michelin XAS FF (Formula France); 155 HR 13 front, 185 HR 13 rear					155 HR 13 front, 185 HR 13 rear (175/70/HR 13 front, 205/70/HR 13 rear from late 1979 on)
Weight	895 kg (1,973.1 lb)		980–1,015 kg (2,160.5–2,237.7 lb)			
Fuel capacity	60 L (15.9 US gal)		56 L (14.8 US gal)	60 L (15.9 US gal)	56 L (14.8 US gal)	
Top speed	185 km/h (115.0 mph)		190 km/h (118.1 mph)	185 km/h (115.0 mph)	190 km/h (118.1 mph)	
Acceleration 0 – 100 km/h (62.1 mph)	11.5 seconds		10.9 seconds	11.5 seconds	10.9 seconds	

== Gallery ==
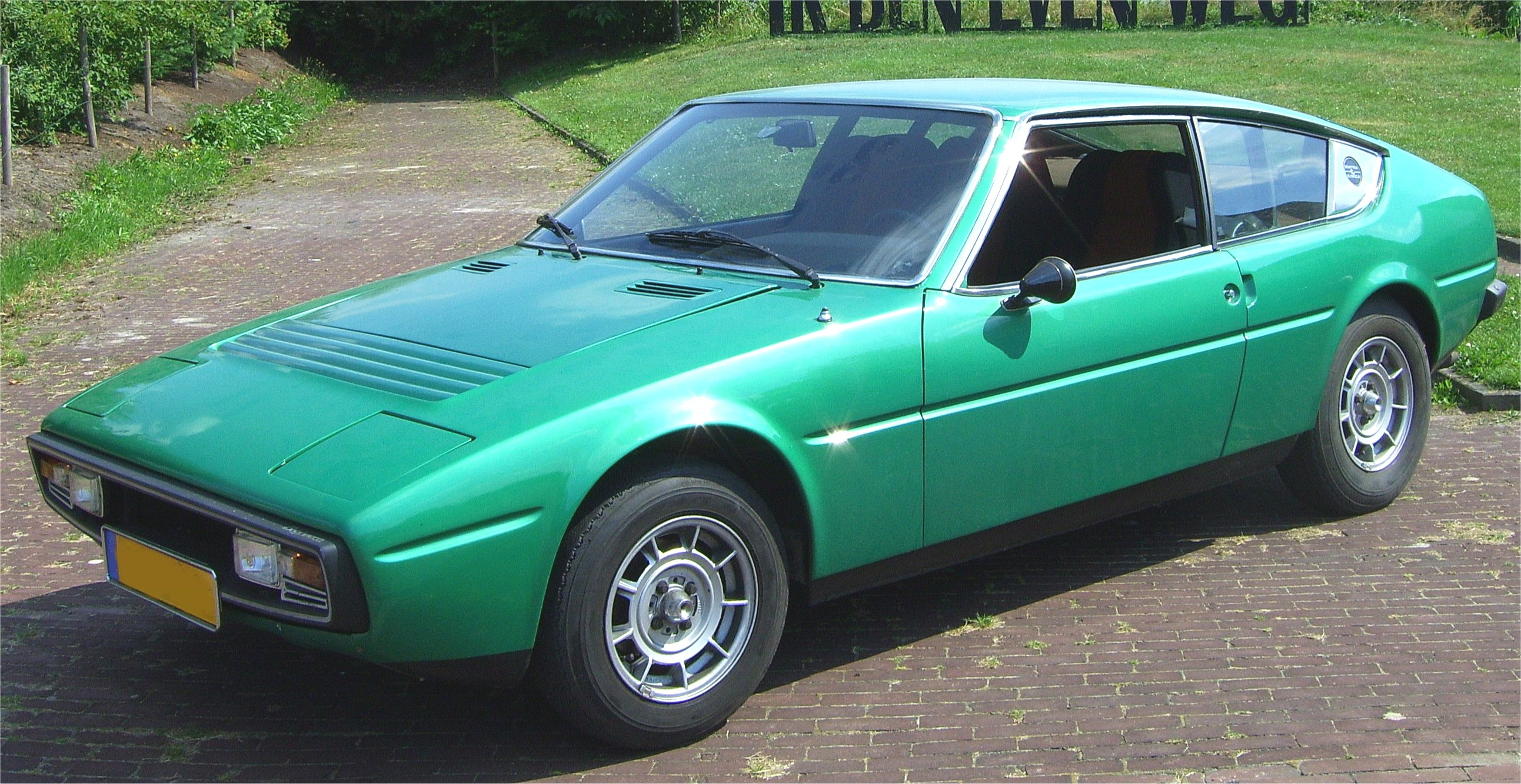
Front three-quarter view

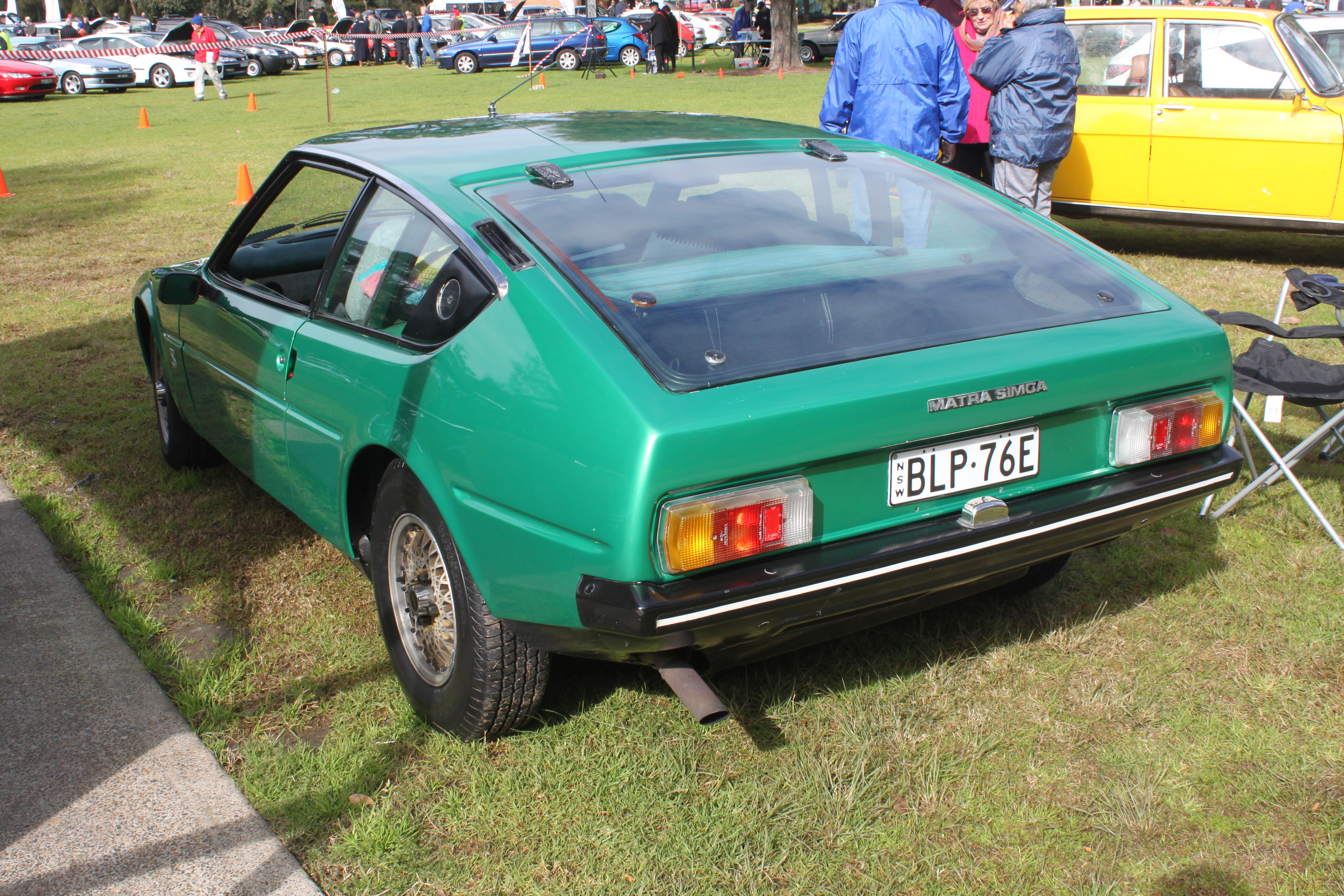
Rear three-quarter view

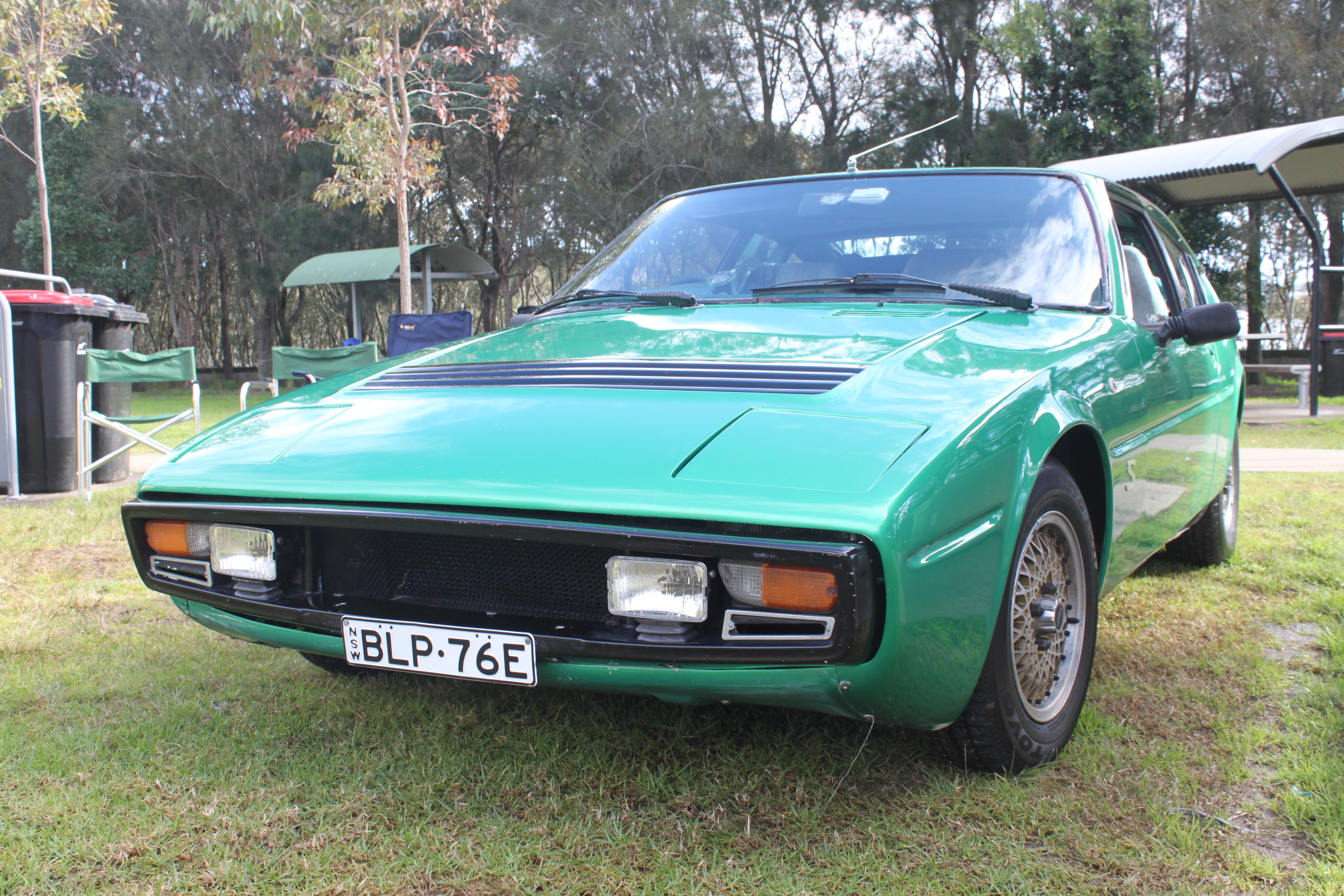
Nose

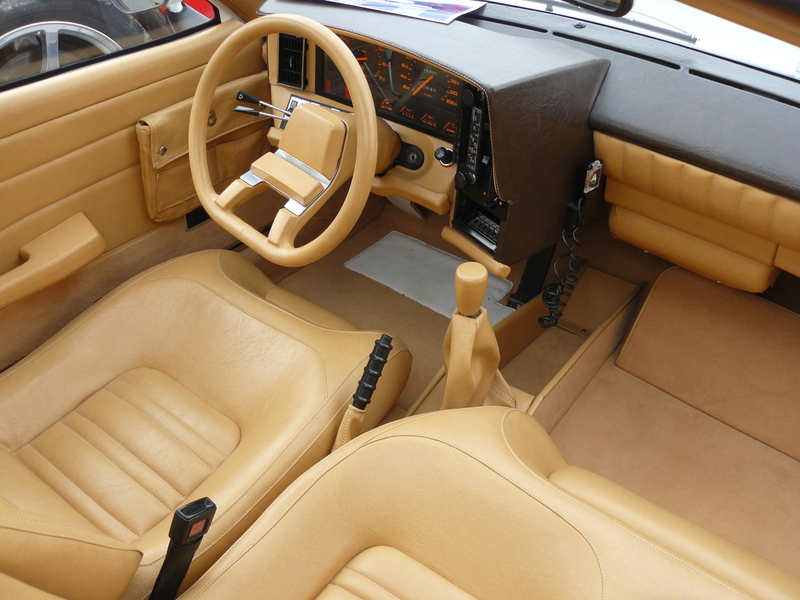
Courrèges Dashboard

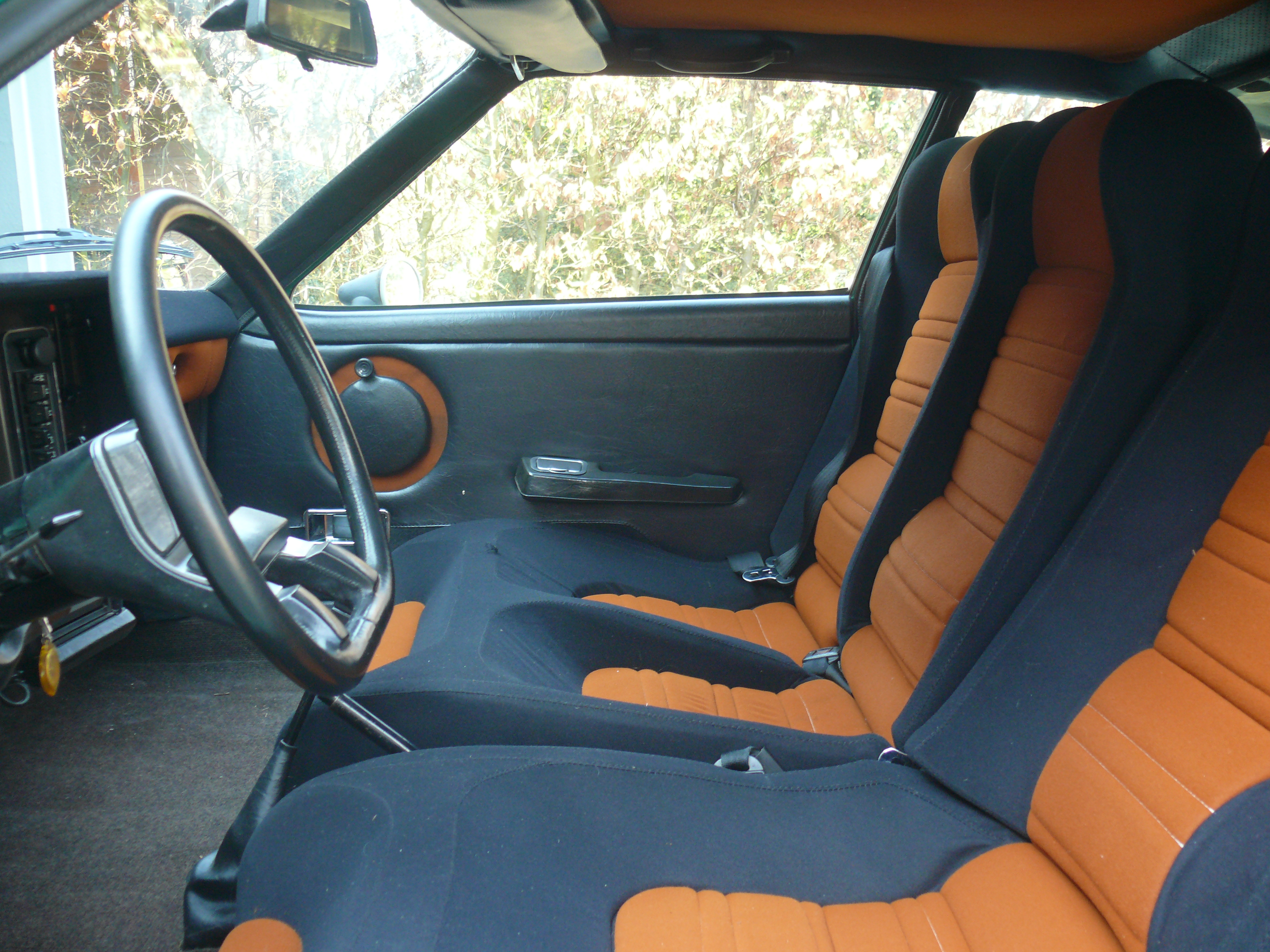
Seating

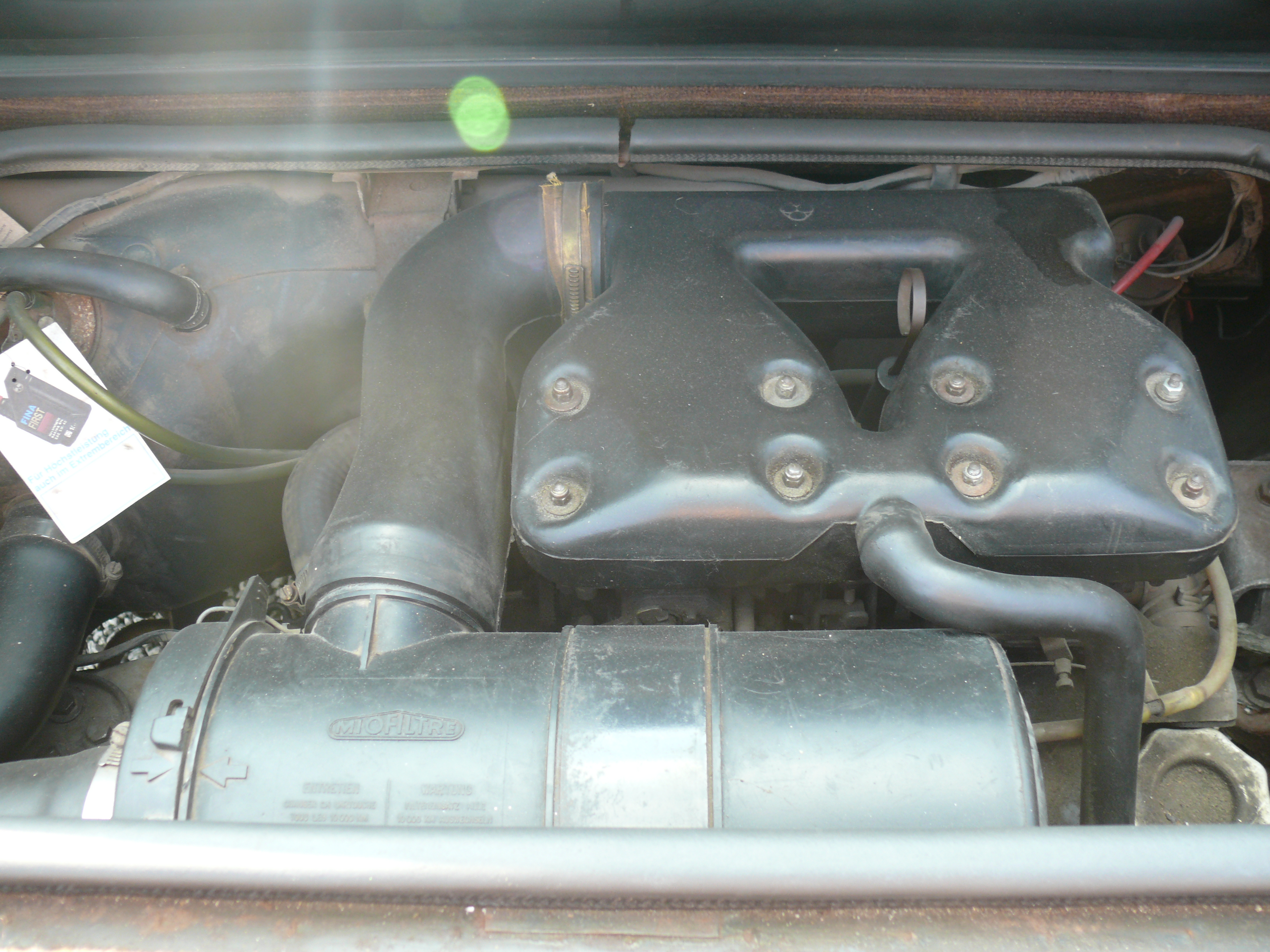
Engine bay

Bagheera U8 Prototype at the Matra Museum
