= Matra Rancho =

Leisure activity vehicle produced by Matra (1977–1984)

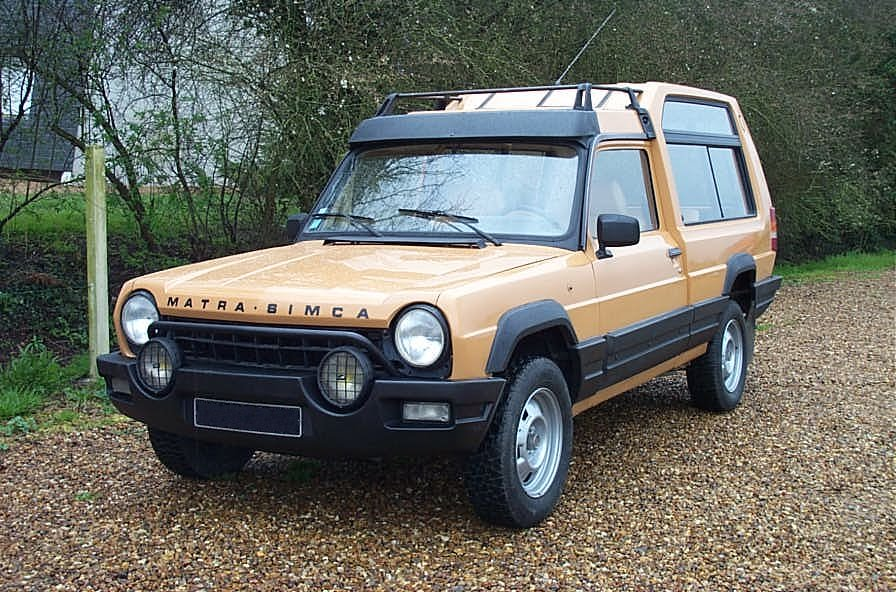

Overview
- Manufacturer: Matra
- Also called: Matra-Simca Rancho (1977–1979); Talbot Matra Rancho (1980–1984); Matra-Simca and Talbot-Matra Ranch (Italy)
- Production: 1977–1984
- Assembly: France: Romorantin-Lanthenay
- Designer: Antonis Volanis

Body and chassis
- Class: Leisure activity vehicle
- Body style: 3-door estate
- Layout: FF layout
- Related: Simca 1100

Powertrain
- Engine: 1.4 L Type 315 ohv I4
- Transmission: 4-speed manual

Dimensions
- Wheelbase: 2,520 mm (99.2 in)
- Length: 4,315 mm (169.9 in)
- Width: 1,665 mm (65.6 in)
- Height: 1,735 mm (68.3 in)
- Curb weight: 1,130 kg (2,491 lb)

The Matra Rancho is a leisure activity vehicle created by the French engineering group Matra, in cooperation with the automaker Simca, to capitalize on the off-road trend started by the Range Rover. The Rancho provided an "off-road look" at a lower price.

== History ==
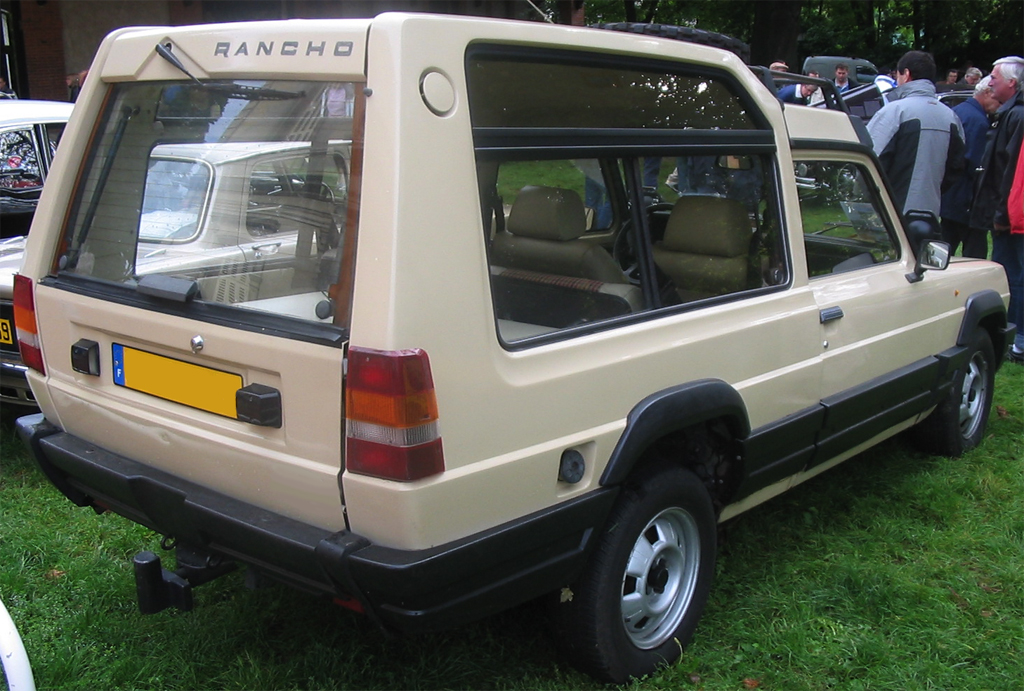
Matra Rancho rear

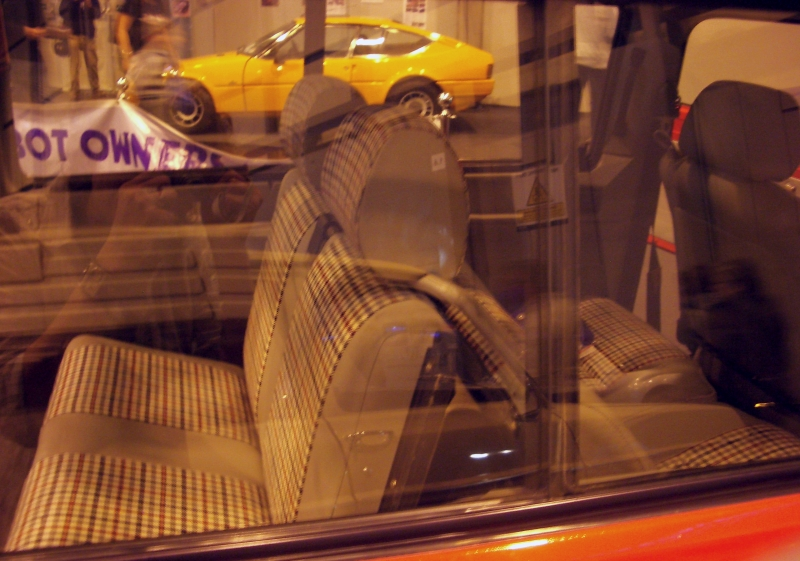
The Rancho's optional third row of seats (making it an early MPV) shared head restraints with the normal rear seats

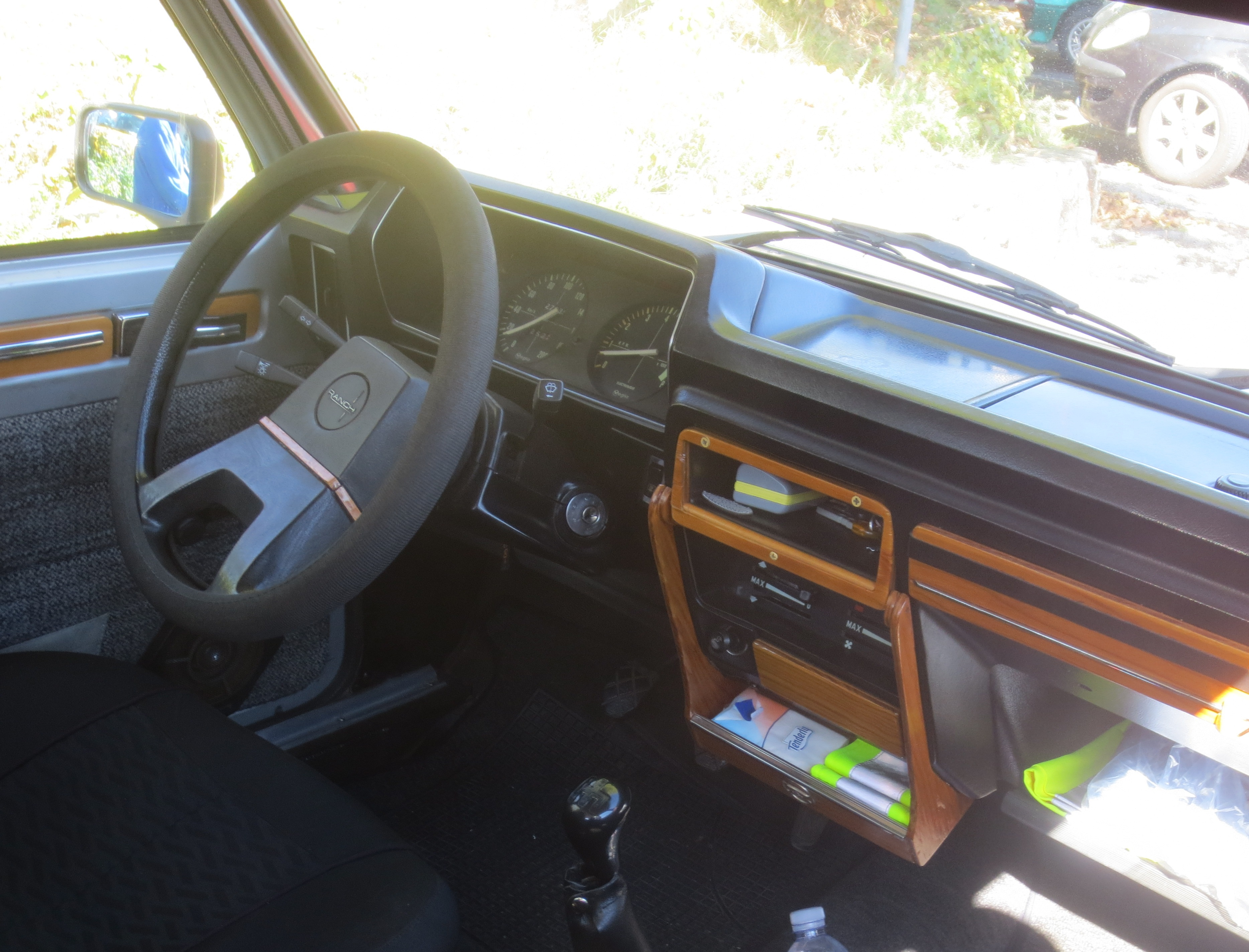
Matra Rancho dashboard

The Rancho was launched in 1977, and became a popular model, but this did not alleviate larger problems at Chrysler Europe (Simca's parent company at the time). Chrysler finally sold its European arm to PSA in 1978, which was then rebranded as Talbot in 1979. The Matra-Simca Rancho became the Talbot Matra Rancho and production continued until 1984 (although it remained on sale up to January 1985), reaching 57,792 cars in total.

Designed by Antonis Volanis, the Rancho was based on the pick-up version of Simca's popular supermini, the Simca 1100, using its front structure and a stretched chassis. The rest of the body was made by Matra from fibreglass and polyester, including the mouldings adorning the body, which made it look more "sturdy". This technology would later be used on the Renault Espace, Europe's first MPV, which was manufactured by Matra. The ground clearance was also increased. Unlike most off-roaders, it was not fitted with all-wheel drive, retaining the 1100s front-wheel drive layout. Other elements retained from the 1100 included the dashboard and front seats (identical to the ones found in the Simca 1100 GLS). The Rancho was powered by the 1,442 cc, 80 hp (59 kW) version of the "Poissy" straight-four engine.

During its life, the Rancho was offered in several versions. Apart from the basic Rancho, there was the Grand Raid, fitted with such off-road extras as an electric winch on the front bumper and an extra spare wheel mounted on the roof - as well as a limited-slip differential. It also received undercarriage protection, bronze tinted windows, and was only available in a matte green colour. The Rancho X was the upscale model, with additional standard items such as alloy wheels and metallic paint. The Découvrable model's rear cabin consisted of an open frame with roll-down fabric covers, which could serve as an "open" car during good weather. Finally, the Rancho AS was the commercial version, with no rear seat, making it exempt from the French tax on passenger cars.

The Rancho spawned an unlikely successor: the Renault Espace. Matra wanted to replace the Rancho with their prototype of the Espace known as the "dessin orange", which translates to "the orange drawing" in English – both the prototype and the background it was drawn on were orange. It predicted the basic shape of the first Espace but only had three doors instead of five. Peugeot (who controlled Matra at the time) deemed the project too expensive and not promising enough. Determined to take its design to production Matra knocked on Renault's door and they quickly adopted the project, one that upon its launch in 1984 arguably became the first European minivan.
