= Matra Murena =

Sports car

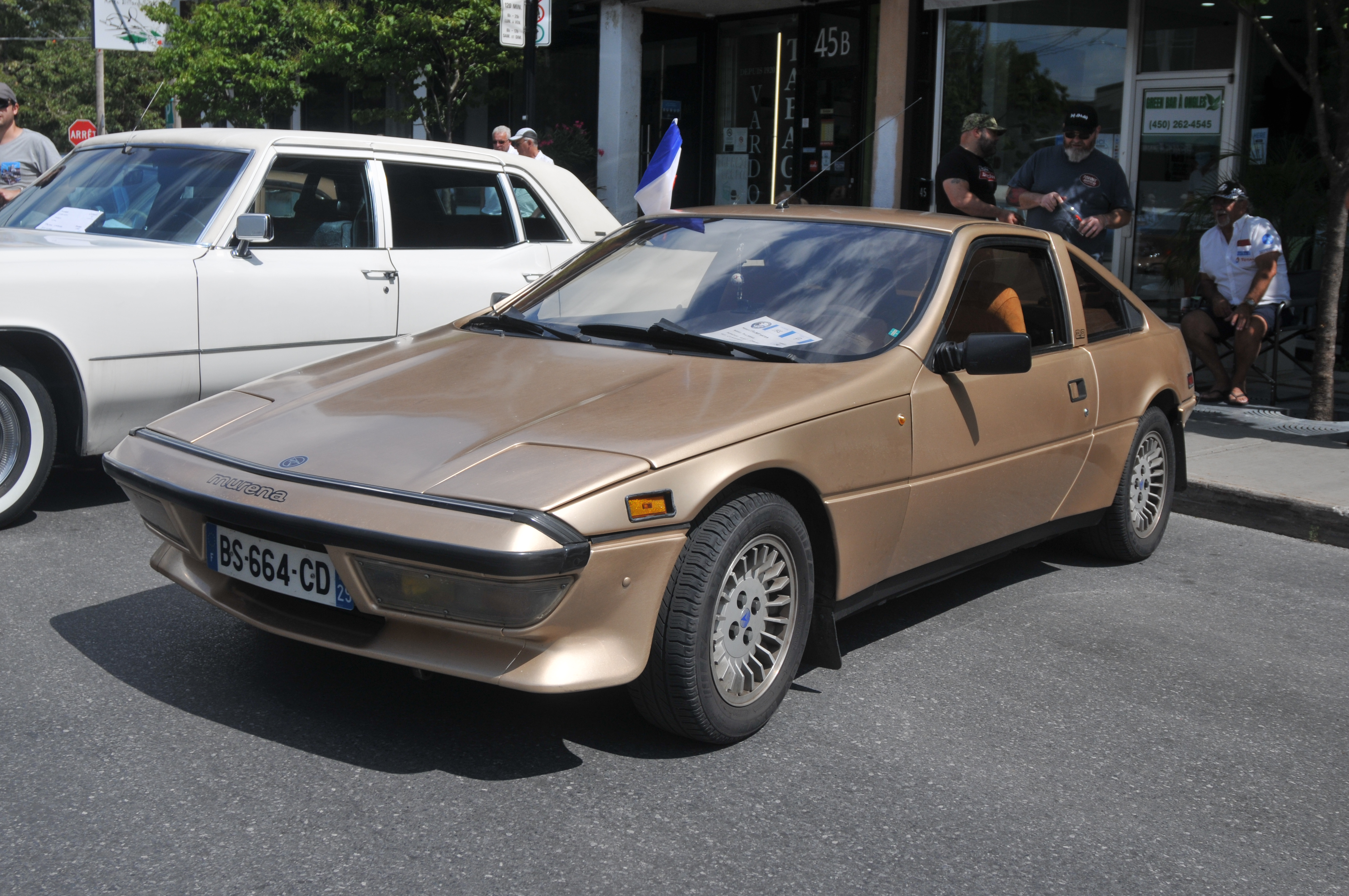

Overview
- Manufacturer: Matra
- Also called: Talbot-Matra Murena
- Production: 1980–1983
- Assembly: France: Romorantin-Lanthenay
- Designer: Antonis Volanis

Body and chassis
- Class: Sports car (S)
- Body style: 3-door hatchback
- Layout: MR layout

Powertrain
- Engine: 1.6 L Poissy ohv I4; 2.2 L Type 180 ohc I4
- Transmission: 5-speed manual

Dimensions
- Wheelbase: 2,435 mm (95.9 in)
- Length: 4,070 mm (160.2 in)
- Width: 1,745 mm (68.7 in)
- Height: 1,220 mm (48.0 in)
- Curb weight: 930–1,030 kg (2,050–2,271 lb)

Chronology
- Predecessor: Matra Bagheera

The Matra Murena is a mid-engined, rear wheel drive sports car that was produced from 1980 through 1983 by the French engineering group Matra. The factory was located in the commune of Romorantin-Lanthenay in the department of Loir-et-Cher in central France.

== Development history ==
The Murena, whose name is Italian for "Moray", was the successor to the Matra Bagheera, a similar vehicle that resulted from an earlier collaboration between Matra and Simca. Development proceeded under two project names; "M551" for the 1.6-litre version and "M552" for the 2.2-litre version. The prototype received designation P-551 and was accompanied by a series of mockups. The Murena inherited the Bagheera's mid-engined layout and hatchback body shape, but substantial changes were made to address some of the problems with the previous model, among which were a lack of power, absence of a 5-speed transmission option, and a chassis extremely prone to rust. Engineering of the car was done entirely by Matra. Greek industrial designer Antonis Volanis, who had contributed to the interior of the earlier Bagheera and been principal designer for the Matra Rancho, headed up the design.

The Murena drew heavily from the corporate parts bin, using engines from the Talbot Solara and Talbot Tagora, a transaxle developed by Citroën for their Citroën CX and also used in some Lancia Beta models, Talbot Horizon taillamp clusters fitted with custom lenses, steering rack and front suspension from the Talbot Solara, front indicator and running lights from the Renault 12, and door handles from the Peugeot 505.

== Features ==
=== Chassis ===
The Murena's chassis was a new design. In appearance it was very close to a full unitary body. The chassis differed from the Bagheera's in two significant ways; the rear cradle was reconfigured to accommodate a new rear suspension system, and the entire chassis was galvanised to prevent the Murena from falling victim to the rust problems that plagued the Bagheera. The Murena was the first production car to use galvanised steel for all chassis parts.

The car was only built in a left hand drive configuration, although a small number of right hand drive conversions were done by Wooler-Hodec.

=== Bodywork ===
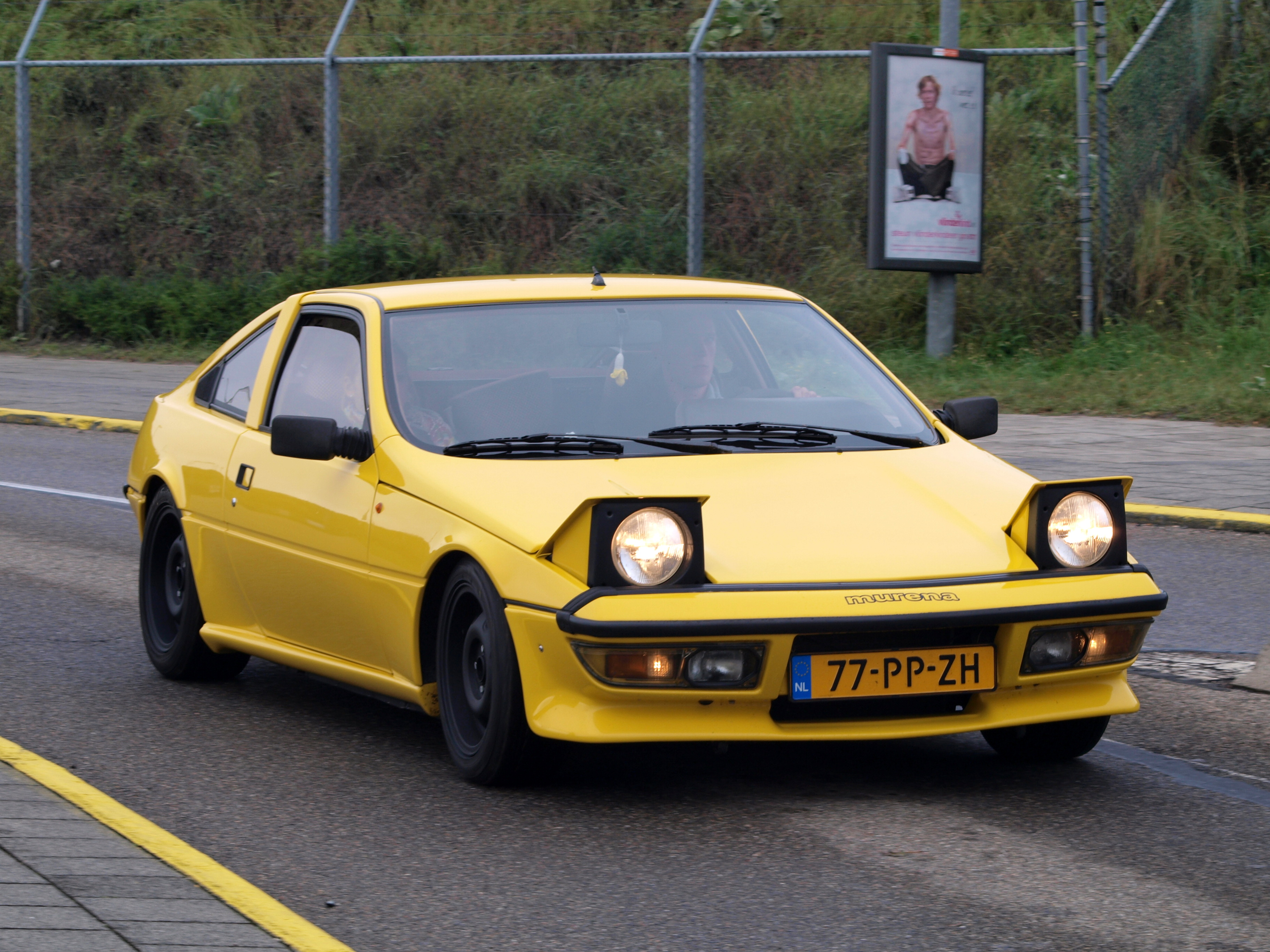
Headlamps raised.

Like the chassis, the styling for the Murena was all-new. The final shape was very aerodynamic for the time, with a reported drag coefficient ($\scriptstyle C_\mathrm d\,$) of 0.328. The rear hatch opened to provide access to the engine mounted behind the passenger compartment and a rear luggage area. A signature feature carried over from the previous model was the seating arrangement - all three seats were placed in one row, with the middle seat folding down to become an armrest when not in use by a passenger. In the Murena the three seats were separate, in contrast to the 2+1 arrangement in the Bagheera.

The car's twelve major body panels were made of fibreglass-epoxy. According to Matra's general manager, Jean-Louis Caussin, these body panels were produced using a manufacturing process known as the "sheet moulding compound" moulding process. The new galvanised chassis coupled with the composite panels made the car essentially immune to rust, except for the rear suspension's trailing arms.

Over its production life the car was offered in a range of ten colours; platinum metallic, white neve, coral metallic, Hudson green, bordeau, mephisto red, titanium gray, cinnamon metallic, mimosa yellow, and Colombia blue (in 2 versions, a purple tint for the 1984 modelyear).

=== Suspension ===
The front suspension was similar to the Bagheera's, while the rear suspension was a departure from the Murena's predecessor. In the tradition of the Simca 1100, Talbot Alpine, and Talbot Horizon, at the front were upper and lower transverse A-arms with longitudinal torsion bars and telescopic hydraulic shock-absorbers. An anti-roll bar was also fitted. At the rear, the Bagheera's torsion bar suspension was replaced by semi-trailing arms with coil springs mounted on telescopic hydraulic shock absorbers. An anti-roll bar was also fitted at the rear.

=== Powertrain ===
Two engines were offered. The base model had a 1.6-litre Poissy engine, while the more powerful version came with a 2.2-litre Type 180. The 2.2-litre engine could also be ordered with a performance package called the "Préparation 142" option that raised the power output from 118 PS (87 kW) to 142 PS (104 kW). This kit was initially a dealer-installed option, but the last 480 Murenas came with this uprated engine directly from the factory. This version was called the Murena S. The standard 2.2-litre engine used a single Solex down-draught carburetor, but S models had twin side-draught Solex carburetors.

The Murena received a 5-speed manual transaxle derived from that of the Citroën CX (or depending on the model year the Lancia Beta). Different models of Murena used different final-drive ratios but all Murenas used the same transaxle.

== Technical details ==
Model:	Murena 1.6	Murena 2.2	Murena 2.2 "Préparation 142" and Murena S
Engine	1.6-litre Poissy	2.2-litre Type 180	
Orientation	Transverse		
Cylinders	4 cylinders		
Valves	8 valves (2 per cylinder)		
Camshaft	Single cam-in-block with overhead valves (OHV)	Single overhead camshaft (SOHC)	Single overhead camshaft (SOHC), custom profile
Displacement	1,592 cc (97.1 cu in)	2,155 cc (131.5 cu in)	
Bore x Stroke	80.6 mm x 78 mm	91.7 mm x 81.6 mm	
Compression ratio	9.35:1	9.45:1	9.5:1
Power	92 PS (68 kW; 91 hp) at 5600 rpm	118 PS (87 kW; 116 hp) at 5800 rpm	142 PS (104 kW; 140 hp) at 6000 rpm
Torque	132 N⋅m (97 lb⋅ft) at 3200 rpm	181 N⋅m (133 lb⋅ft) at 3000 rpm	183 N⋅m (135 lb⋅ft) at 3800 rpm
Catalyst	No		
Fuel grade	RON 97		
Carburation	One Weber 36 DCNVA 16/100 two-barrel carburetor	One Solex 34 CIC F two-barrel down-draught carburetor	Two Solex 40 ADDHE two-barrel side-draught carburetors, intake manifold with 4 separate runners
Transmission	5-speed manual		
Clutch	Single dry plate with hydraulic actuation		
Brakes (front)	234 mm diameter discs with floating single-piston calipers		
Brakes (rear)	234 mm diameter discs with floating single-piston calipers	260.9 mm diameter discs with floating single-piston calipers	
Tires	175/70HR13 or 185/60HR14 front, 195/70HR13 or 195/60 HR14 rear	185/60HR14 front, 195/60HR14 rear	185/60VR14 front, 195/60VR14 rear
Standing kilometre	33.3 seconds	30.4 seconds	29.1 seconds
0 to 100 km/h (62.1 mph)	11.8 seconds	9.3 seconds	8.4 seconds
Top speed	182 km/h (113.1 mph)	197 km/h (122.4 mph)	210 km/h (130.5 mph)
Fuel consumption	6 to 10.5 L/100 km	6.9 to 12.3 L/100 km	6.9 to 13.9 L/100 km

== Driving impressions ==
In the May 1981 issue of Car magazine, in an article titled "Murena the marvellous", automotive journalist LJK Setright described the Murena as being "endowed with a suspension so superb that it need never go slowly". He also wrote that, although not a sprinter, when it came to sustaining high speeds on winding roads "the Murena ranks high — better than the basic Porsche 924, every bit as good as the Lancia Monte Carlo, and losing only in sheer agility to the Fiat X1/9, while it shows up the Porsche 911 as ill-balanced and inept" and went on write that this "is one of the most sweetly responsive cars that ever offered a driver a choice of how to steer through a bend." In the end he felt that the car would benefit from more power.

== Model year changes ==
1981
Murena 1.6 model debuts, followed shortly by the 2.2 model.

1982
The "Préparation 142" option is offered for the 2.2-litre engine. The black interior was introduced and colours added, the bordeaux color was removed from the option list.

1983
The 2.2 interior was updated, instead of having the button seats in grey or brown, the fabric was changed to a striped velvet, with seat styling that followed the 1.6 models.

1984
The 1.6 and 2.2 models are discontinued. The Murena S is the only version offered in model year 1984.

== Production numbers ==
Production of the 1981 model-year Murena 1.6 began in November 1980, followed a few months later by the 2.2. Production of the Matra Murena ended in July 1983, when the Matra factory switched over to building the first generation of Renault Espace minivan.

- Murena 1.6: 5,640 units.
- Murena 2.2: 4,560 units.
- Murena S: 480 units.
- Total production: 10,680 units.

== Prototypes and specials ==
- Development of a 16-valve cylinder head for the 2.2-litre block resulted in the "4S" ("quatre soupapes", or "four valves") prototype. The 4S engine developed 178 PS (131 kW) at 6,000 rpm and 21.5 kg⋅m (211 N⋅m; 156 lb⋅ft) at 4,500 rpm. The 4S also received wider wheel arches and deeper spoilers front and rear.
- One Murena was modified to accommodate a 3-litre Matra MS81 Formula 1 V12 longitudinally in the chassis.
- Politecnic developed 4 wheel drive Murenas for the french rallyecross championship, equipped with a longitudinally placed ROC engine and coupled to a Hewland FT200 gearbox.
- Politecnic developed modified Murenas for Group 4. These cars were equipped with Sodemo tuned engines and were used during Rallye Monte Carlo.
- Maurelec developed a modified Murena for rallyecross, equipped with a 1150cc turbo engine.
- The Politecnic company, with the participation of racing driver Jean-Pierre Beltoise, developed kits and engines to adapt the Murena for racing and also produced a customized version of the Murena called the Matra-Politecnic-Beltoise. This car had custom bodywork, a modified interior and came with a Group 4 engine that produced 184 horsepower.
- A body-conversion kit was developed for the Murena by Saier of Germany that gave the car the appearance of a BMW M1. BMW successfully sued the producers of the kit.
- French coachbuilder Henri Chapron displayed a Murena with a removable roof panel at the 1982 Paris Motor Show. The car was called the Murena Chapron Chimère.

== Motorsports ==
In 1981, a Murena prepared by Politecnic and equipped with an engine built by Bernard “Nanard” Mangé and Dany Snobeck (operating under the name “SODEMO”) was entered in the Rallye Monte Carlo. This was with limited result and the car retired early.

Later the same car was entered in the 1981 1000 Pistas (laps) Rally. The car was driven by Jean-Pierre Beltoise and the co-driver was singer Véronique Jannot. The car retired early, due to failed engine mounting.

Cars were prepared by Marcel Morel (Maurelec) and Politecnic for the French Rallyecross championship, of which Morel was the only one to use a Murena 1.6 as the base model, Politecnic only used modified 2.2s, either with ROC engines or SODEMO prepared engines.

Race-tuned Murenas prepared by Politecnic produced the following results:

3 French Rallycross championship titles
1 European Champion title (2nd division)
1 French Mountain Cup championship

Drivers included Jean-Pierre Beltoise, Max Mamers, Rémy Julienne, Jean-Pierre Jaussaud, Johnny Servoz-Gavin, Jean-Claude Andruet, Marcel Morel and Philippe Wambergue.

== Gallery ==
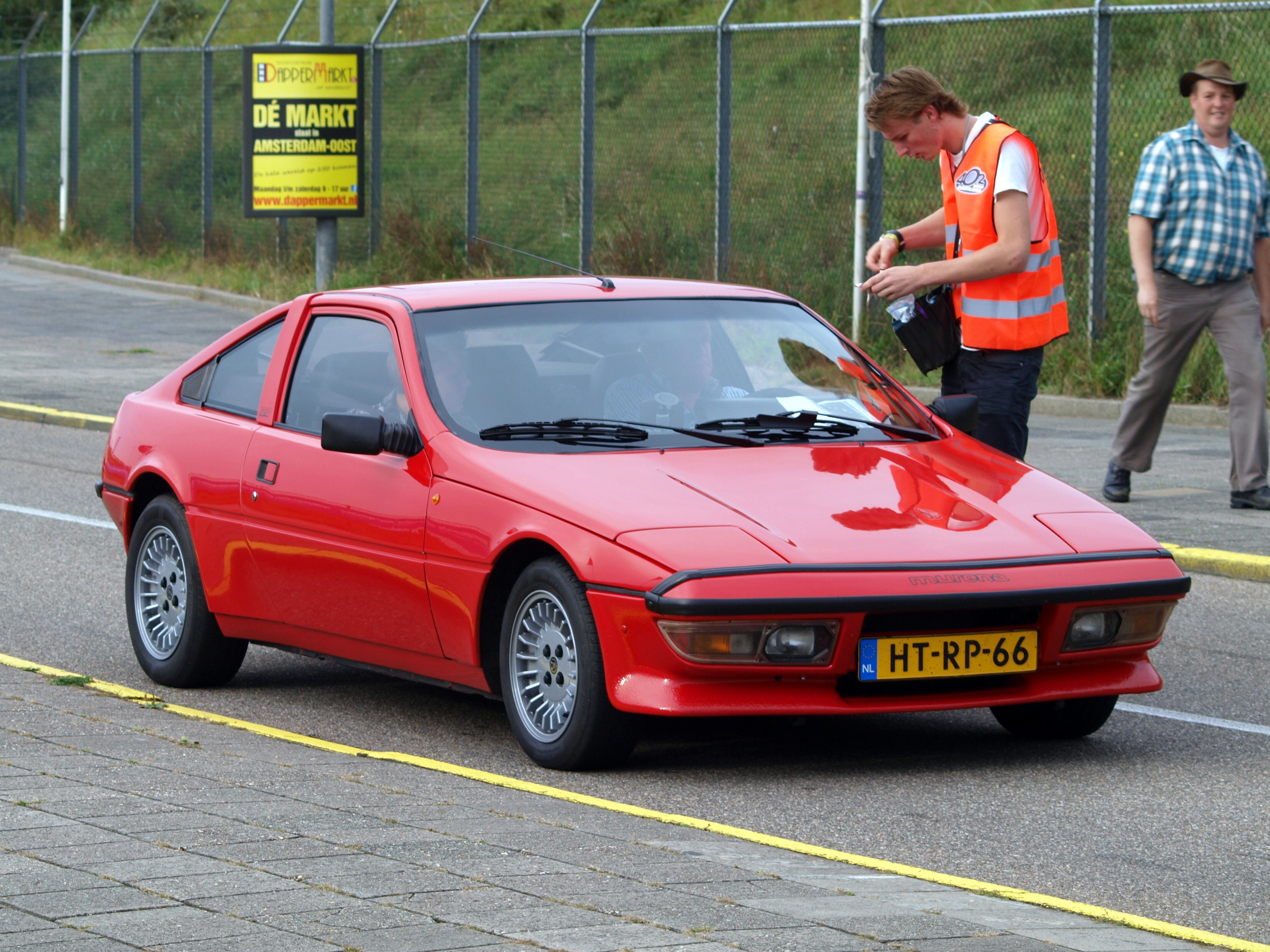
1983 Murena 2.2

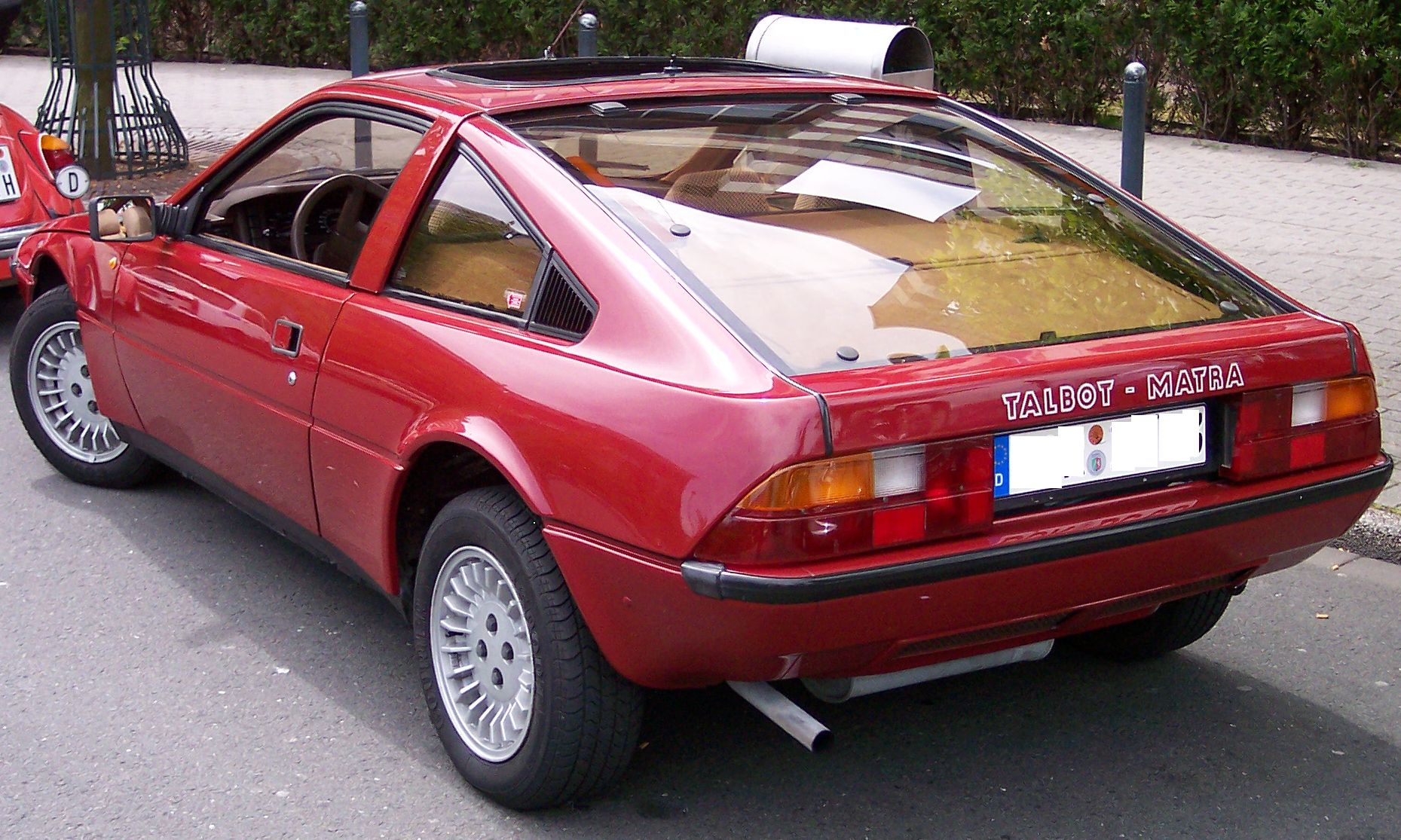
Rear three-quarter view

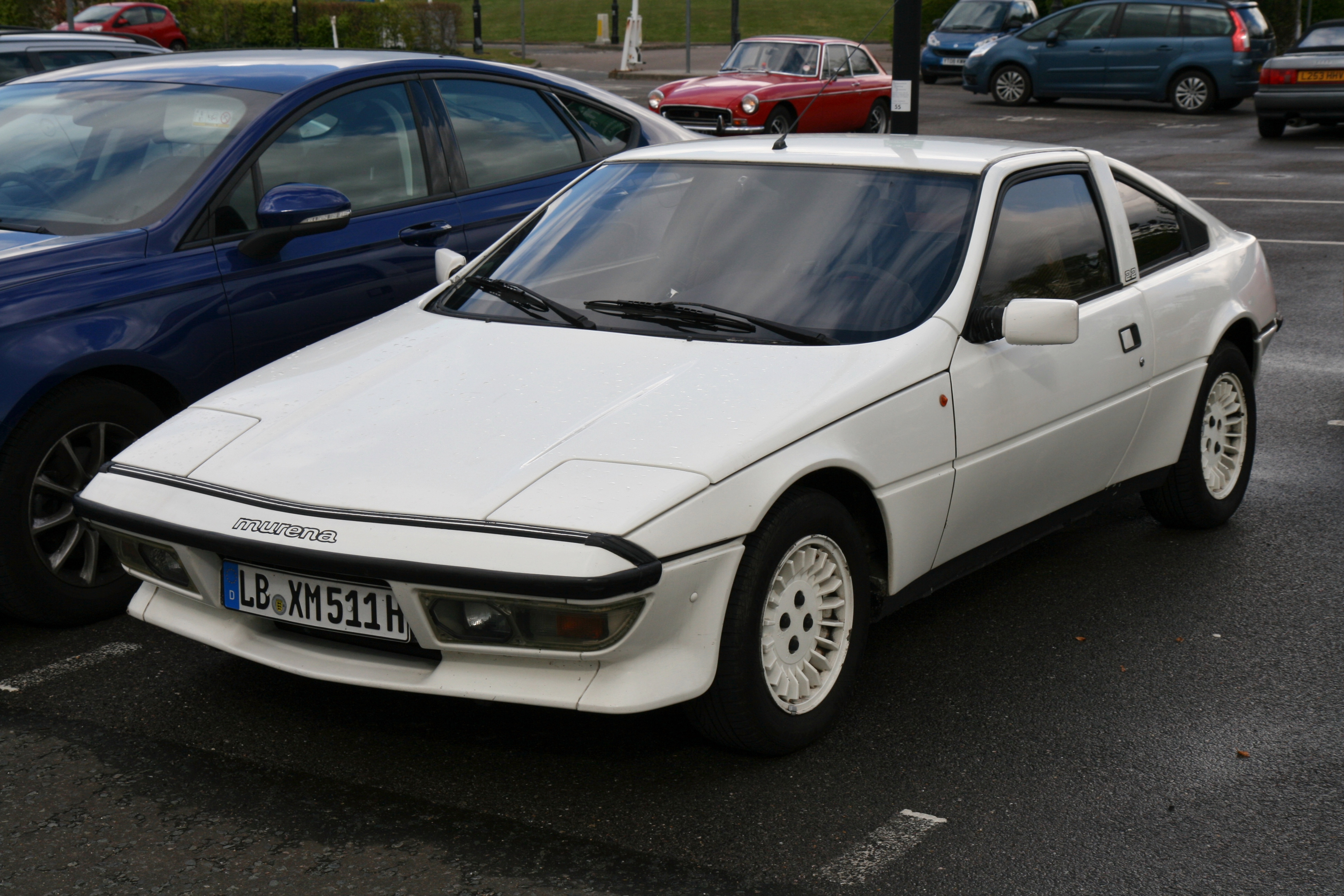
Front view

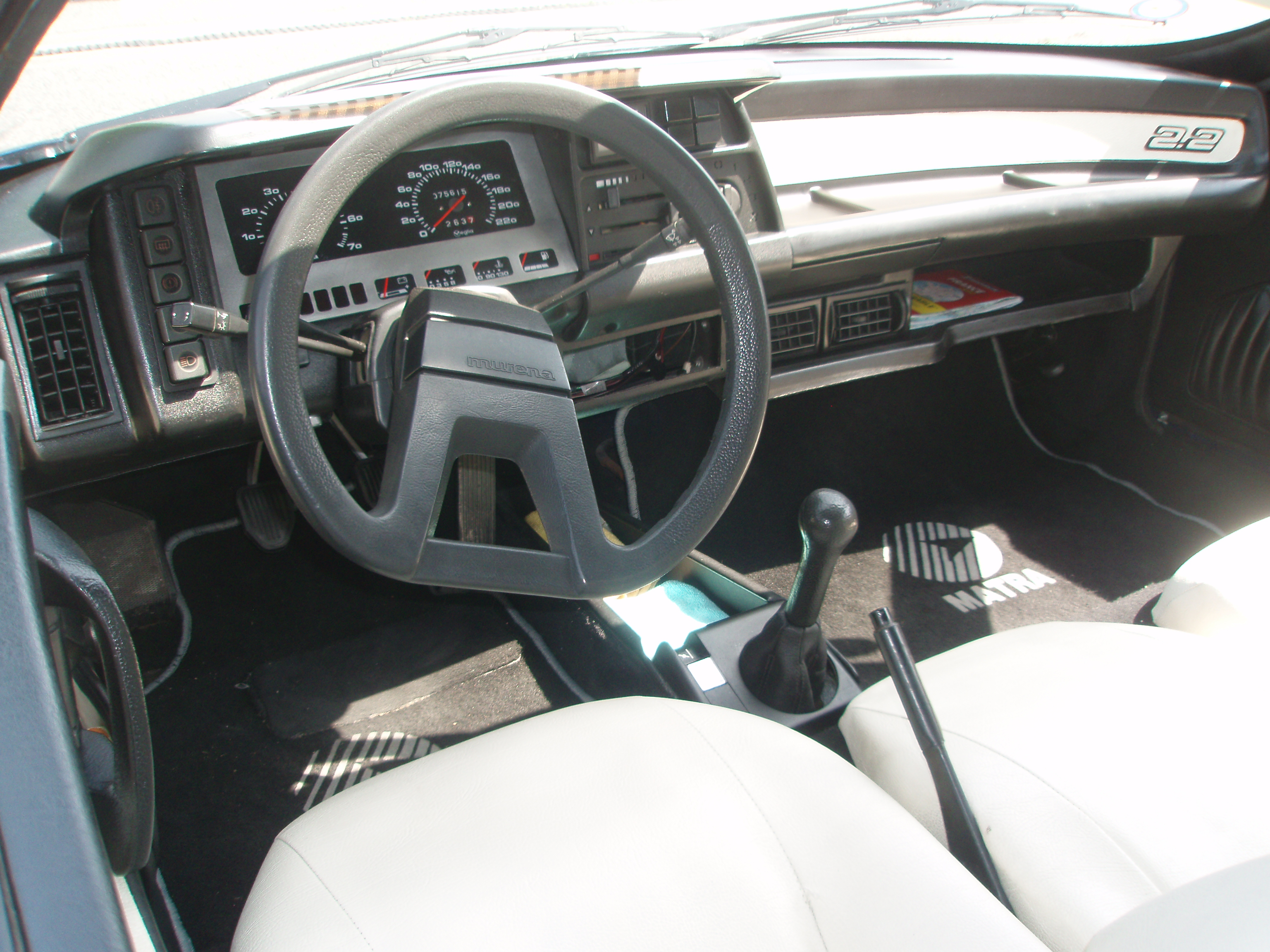
Dashboard

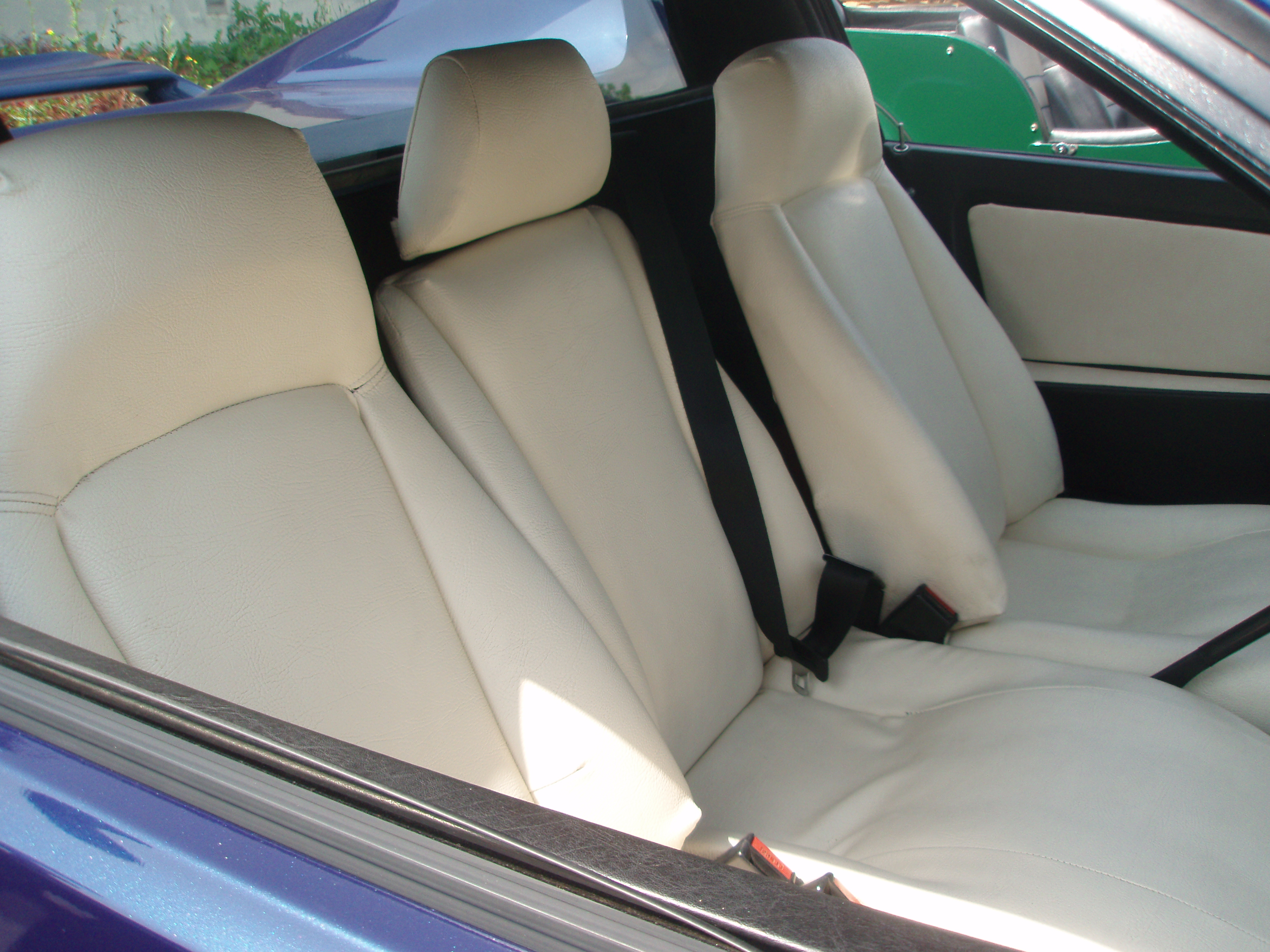
Seating

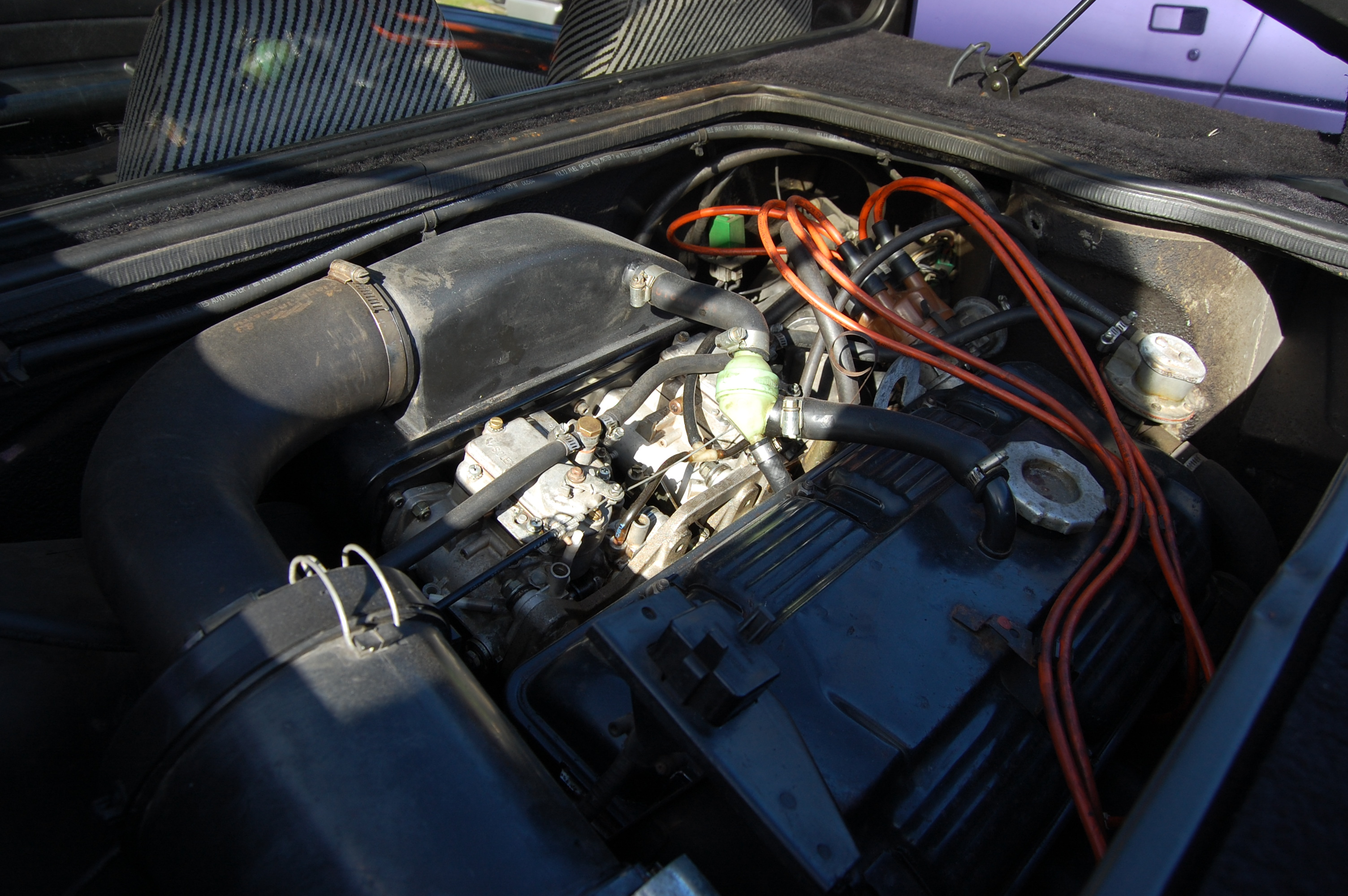
Engine bay

Murena S at the Matra Museum
