= Simca Poissy engine =

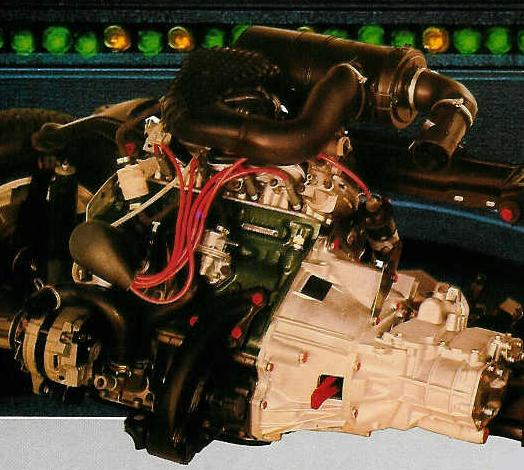

Overview
- Manufacturer: Simca
- Also called: 1100
- Production: 1961–1991

Layout
- Configuration: Inline-4
- Displacement: 0.8 L; 47.4 cu in (777 cc); 0.8 L; 51.5 cu in (844 cc); 0.9 L; 57.6 cu in (944 cc); 1.1 L; 68.2 cu in (1,118 cc); 1.2 L; 73.5 cu in (1,204 cc); 1.3 L; 79.0 cu in (1,294 cc); 1.4 L; 88.0 cu in (1,442 cc); 1.6 L; 97.1 cu in (1,592 cc)
- Cylinder bore: 74 mm (2.9 in); 76.7 mm (3.02 in); 80.6 mm (3.17 in)
- Piston stroke: 65 mm (2.6 in); 70 mm (2.8 in); 78 mm (3.1 in)
- Valvetrain: OHV (2 valves per cylinder)

Combustion
- Fuel system: Single or double-barrel carburetors
- Fuel type: Gasoline
- Oil system: Centrifugal oil filter; later full flow oil filter
- Cooling system: Water-cooled

Output
- Power output: 34–120 PS (25–88 kW; 34–118 hp)

Chronology
- Predecessor: Rush engine
- Successor: PSA TU engine

The Simca Poissy engine, commonly known as the Simca 1100 engine, was a four-cylinder overhead valve engine developed by Simca for use in its superminis and economy cars, designed by the engineer Georges Martin (V12 Matra Sports engine designer). In spite of its common name, the engine actually predates the Simca 1100 model, and debuted in 1961 in the Simca 1000. It was developed and produced by Simca (subsequently rebranded as Talbot) in the late 1960s at the manufacturer's factory in Poissy, hence its name.

The engine was first designed in a 944 cc (57.6 cu in) form, but was reduced and stretched in order to be used in a variety of models and versions, by Simca, the Rootes Group (its partner company in Chrysler Europe), Simca's final incarnation Talbot and its last parent company Peugeot, who used it until 1991 in its midsize model, the 309. The engine existed in displacements ranging from 0.8 to 1.6 L (777 to 1,592 cc), the biggest one on both sides of the Atlantic, powering the United States-market Dodge Omni/Plymouth Horizon.

Peugeot eventually dropped the engines, replacing them with their own TU family.

== Poissy engine ==
The Poissy engine was introduced in 1961 in the Simca 1000, a small four-door saloon car. It featured a displacement of 944 cc (57.6 cu in) and had an initial output of 34 PS (25 kW; 34 hp), which would be increased over the years to a maximum of 44 PS (32 kW; 43 hp) on the base model. The following year, the Type 315 was used for the first time in a two-door sports model, the Simca 1000 Coupé, in a tuned form, with 52 PS (38 kW; 51 hp).

The overhead valve engine Type 315 was a modern unit, with a water-cooled inline design with cast iron crankshaft, alloy cross-flow head and five main bearings. An unusual feature on early models was the absence of a spin-on paper oil filter. Instead, the engine featured a form of centrifugal oil filter in the hollow rear crankshaft pulley, although all later versions used the more traditional disposable cartridge filters. One of its major innovations was the use of a swirl vortex on the intake valve port which gave very good combustion, and thus both power and economy for this time. This engine proved cheap to build, and several models of different sizes and market segments used this displacement, which survived until 1982, as the ever-present entry level for the Simca 1100.

In later life however, when it was installed in cars such as the Horizon and 1307/Alpine/Solara the Poissy engine was criticized for its poor mechanical refinement—in particular for its excessive tappet noise, something which led to poor press reviews. It survived as the entry level engine in the Peugeot 309 until 1991.

=== Smaller variants ===
The Poissy engine was reduced a few times, although it didn't have much use apart from the early and more compact models. In 1964, Simca developed an 844 cc (51.5 cu in) version for the Spanish market 1000, as cars over 0.9 L were in a higher tax bracket. This variant existed in two output levels, the most powerful of which, and two single-barrel carburetors, which increased power to 43 PS (32 kW; 42 hp). An even more economic version was created for the entire European market in late 1968, with only 777 cc (47.4 cu in). These displacements were used in the Simca 1000 up to 1978.

=== Larger variants ===
In 1968, another version was created for the Spanish market, the 1.2 L; 73.5 cu in (1,204 cc) displacement. This was the first sporty version of the 1000, with power rising to 55 PS (40 kW; 54 hp). A double-barrel carburetor was then used in the Simca 1200 S, a coupé designed by Bertone, and the CG sports car, and could reach 85 PS (63 kW; 84 hp). The regular version was later used in various models around the European market, and was even installed in the US-market version of the Simca 1100, known as the Simca 1204. It was in use until 1978.

The 1.1 L; 68.2 cu in (1,118 cc) variant appeared in 1967, initially in the 1100 and then in the 1000. This proved to be one of the most popular displacements of the 315 engines, powering the LCV version of the 1100, known as VF2, and the Talbot Horizon's entry level version. It survived until 1991, when it was used as the base model to the Peugeot 309.

The 1.3 L; 79.0 cu in (1,294 cc) variant debuted in 1972, and although it wasn't very popular in the 1000, it continued to be used in various Simca and Talbot models. It was famous in racing circles, by being used to power the Simca Rallye 2, a sporty version of the 1000 introduced in 1972, with two double-barrel carburetors and a maximum power of 82 PS (60 kW; 81 hp). Racing versions could be tuned well in excess of 120 PS (88 kW; 118 hp), and the three generations of the Simca Rallye using this engine are still used throughout Europe, especially France, in various national rally championships for classic cars and non-homologated cars.

The 1.4 L; 88.0 cu in (1,442 cc) variant was first used in 1975 in the Simca 1307/Chrysler Alpine. On virtue of its size, it could reach 85 PS (63 kW; 84 hp) with a double-barrel carburetor, but unlike the 1.3 L version, it was never used for racing in any capacity, Simca and Talbot preferring to use it in its larger models, including deluxe versions of the Horizon and the Solara. It also powered Europe's first soft-roader, the Matra Rancho.

The larger iteration of the Poissy engine was the 1.6 L; 97.1 cu in (1,592 cc) variant. Like the 1.45 L engine, it debuted in the 1307/Alpine in 1975, and was positioned at the top of the range, initially only with an automatic transmission (the only version of the engine to feature one), necessary to ensure this engine could power the US-market versions of the Chrysler Europe models. It was notorious for its use in the Dodge Omni and Plymouth Horizon, and was dubbed Peugeot by the American media, despite the fact that Peugeot had nothing to do with its design. It was also used as the base engine for the three-seater coupé Matra Murena.

== Different models ==
=== 777 cc ===
This tiny model was a tax special introduced in late 1968 to fit the Simca 1000 into France's 4CV tax category. The engine code is type 359.

- Simc'4 – 1968–1978

=== 844 cc ===
This "tax special" was only offered in the Spanish market, where cars of over 850 cc (52 cu in) received a heavy tax penalty. It was called the Simca 900. The car was introduced in 1970 with a 40 PS (29 kW) engine. In 1973 it was reintroduced as the 900 Special, now with a Bressel 32 twin carburetor and 43 PS (32 kW) at 5800 rpm.

- Simca 900 – 1970–1977 (Spain)

=== 944 cc ===
Introduced for longitudinal applications (for the rear-engined 1000 range), this engine was called the 315. In 1968 a version for transverse installation (for the new front-wheel drive 1100) called the type 352 was introduced. Some of its improvements were also applied to the original version, which now carried the 349 code. In 1973, Simca changed their engine coding system and the longitudinal engine now became the 1D1 while the transverse model became the 3D1.

- Simca 1000 Coupé – 1961–1966
- Simca 1000 – 1962–1978
- CG 1000 – 1966–1974
- Simca 1100 – 1968–1976

=== 1118 cc ===
When installed in Peugeots, it was called the E1A engine. Originally it was called the type 350 (for transversal installations) or 351 (for longitudinal ones). These became the 3E1 and 1E1 respectively in 1973.

- Simca 1000 – 1968–1978
- Simca 1100 – 1967–1982
- Simca-Talbot Horizon – 1977–1987
- Peugeot 205 – July 1987 — October 1988, some Spanish built XL/GL models
- Peugeot 309 – 1986–1989
- Citroen C15 – 1987–1988

=== 1204 cc ===
The 1.2 L; 73.5 cu in (1,204 cc) iterations received an increase in stroke over the 1.1 engine, to 70 mm (2.8 in), while retaining the 74 mm (2.9 in) bore. Originally fitted to the somewhat sporting 1100 Spécial, it carried the 353 engine code. The rear-engined (longitudinal) version was called the 354. Later the engine code was changed to 1F1 (for single carburettor versions), and after PSA's takeover it was briefly installed in Spanish market 205s where it was called the F1.

- Simca 1000 GT, Rallye GT, Special (Spain only)
- Simca 1200S Bertone – 1968–1971
- Simca CG – 1967–1974
- Simca 1100 – 1967–1979
- Simca VF2 – 1973–1985
- Peugeot 205 – 1987–1990, Spain only
- Peugeot 309 – Spain only

=== 1294 cc ===
The 1.3 L; 79.0 cu in (1,294 cc) iteration was introduced in 1971, replacing the earlier 1.2 L; 73.5 cu in (1,204 cc) unit used. The bore was increased to 76.7 mm (3.02 in), while the stroke remained 70 mm (2.8 in). The engine code was 366 for transversal installations, while longitudinal engines were called type 371. In 1973, Simca changed their system and the engines became 3G (transversal) and 1G (longitudinal) instead. After PSA began to closer combine their operations with those of the erstwhile Simca corporation, the engine code was changed yet again, to G1A, for use in the 309 and late Horizons. The 1978-only Simca 1000 Rallye III had the most potent unit yet, the 1G4C.

- Simca 1000 – 1972–1974
- Simca Rallye – 1972–1978
- Simca 1100 Special/TI – 1971–1982
- Simca 1307 / Chrysler Alpine / Talbot 1510 – 1975–1982
- Matra Bagheera – 1973–1976
- Simca-Talbot Horizon – 1977–1985
- Talbot Solara – 1980–1985
- Peugeot 205 – Spanish-built XR/GR models
- Peugeot 309 – 1986–1990
- Citroen C15 – 1987–1988

=== 1442 cc ===
Introduced in 1975, this larger model carries the 6Y engine code. The 6Y1 has a single carburettor. while the 6Y2 has a double barrel one, and the 6Y4 has twin, double-barrel carbs.

- Simca 1200 – Spain, 1979–1980
- Simca 1307 / Chrysler Alpine / Talbot 1510 – 1975–1983
- Matra Bagheera – 1976–1980
- Matra Rancho – 1977–1982
- Simca-Talbot Horizon – 1977–1987
- Talbot Solara – 1980–1986
- Peugeot 309 GR – Spain, 1985–1989
- Peugeot 205 – some Spanish built models

=== 1592 cc ===
This engine was known as the 6J internally. 6J1 engines have a single carburettor, while 6J2s have a twin unit. The slightly more powerful version at 92 PS (68 kW; 91 hp) fitted to the Murena is called the 6J2A.

- Simca 1307 / Chrysler Alpine / Talbot 1510 – 1975–1984
- Matra Murena – 1980–1983
- Simca-Talbot Horizon – 1983–1987
- Dodge Omni / Plymouth Horizon – 1983–1986
- Talbot Solara – 1980–1986
- Peugeot 205 GTX (Spain, 1987 – October 1991)
- Peugeot 309 SR – (Spain, 1985–1989)

== See also ==
List of Chrysler engines
