= Simca 1100 =

Series of French compact family cars (1967-1985)

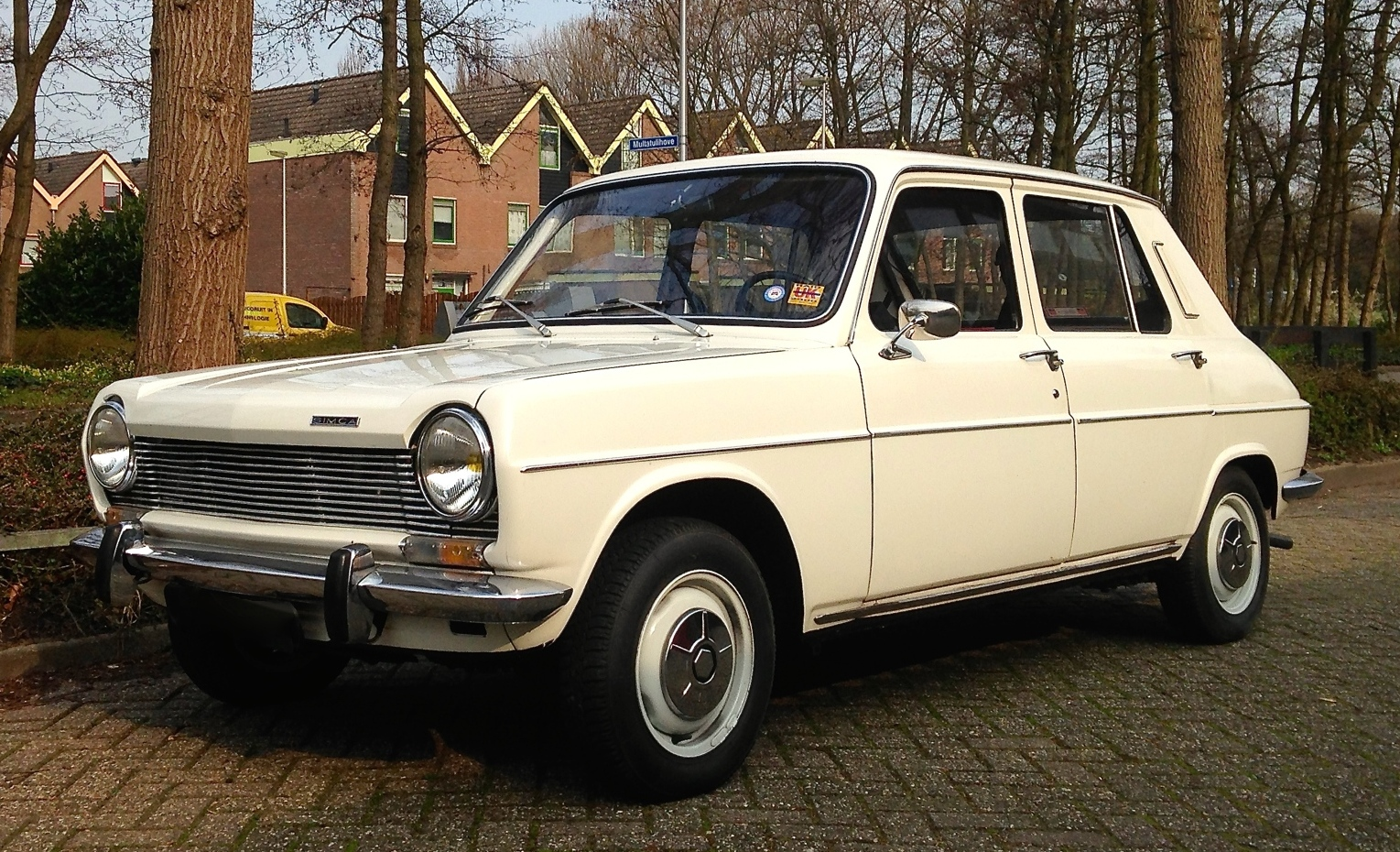

Overview
- Manufacturer: Simca
- Also called: Simca 1200; Simca 1118/1204 (US); Simca VF; Talbot 1100; Talbot 1200; Dodge 1100
- Production: 1967–1985
- Assembly: Poissy, France; Madrid, Spain (as Simca 1200)

Body and chassis
- Class: C-segment compact family car
- Body style: 3/5-door hatchback 5-door estate 2-door coupe utility (pickup); 3-door van
- Layout: Front engine, front-wheel drive
- Related: Matra Rancho

Powertrain
- Engine: 944 cc type 352/3D1 I4; 1118 cc type 350/3E1 I4; 1204 cc type 353/3F1 I4; 1294 cc type 366/3G1/3G2/3G4 I4; 1442 cc type 6Y2 I4 (Spain only)

Dimensions
- Wheelbase: 2,520 mm (99.2 in)
- Length: 3,937 mm (155.0 in)
- Width: 1,587 mm (62.5 in)
- Height: 1,460 mm (57.5 in)
- Kerb weight: 918 kg (2,024 lb)

Chronology
- Successor: Talbot Horizon

The Simca 1100 is a series of French compact family cars – mainly C-segment hatchbacks, but also a compact wagon and popular delivery vans – built for over 15 years by French car-maker Simca, from 1967 through 1982/1985. There was even a very early 'hot hatchback', and a family cross-over: the Matra Simca Rancho. The hatchbacks were replaced by the Simca-Talbot Horizon.

The 1967 Simca 1100 series was historically significant for combining numerous modern design features – in affordable cars with numerous available engines. The 1100 series were among the first unibody family hatchbacks and compact estates to integrate a transversely mounted engine and front-wheel drive with all-around, modern independent suspension with anti-roll bars (double wishbones up front, and rear semi-trailing arms), disc brakes, rack and pinion steering, and folding rear seats for maximum space utilisation and practicality.

The front-wheel drive Simca 1100 hatchback range, introduced in 1967 was a top seller across Europe, and was said to have influenced Volkswagen to replace its range of rear-engined and rear-drive air-cooled vehicles with a front-engined, front-drive, water cooled cars, leading to the Mk 1 VW Polo, Golf and Passat series.

At just under four metres in length (3.94 m (12.9 ft)), the Simca 1100 set the blueprint for European and Japanese C-segment hatchbacks, defining most of their core design traits from then on.

== Introduction ==
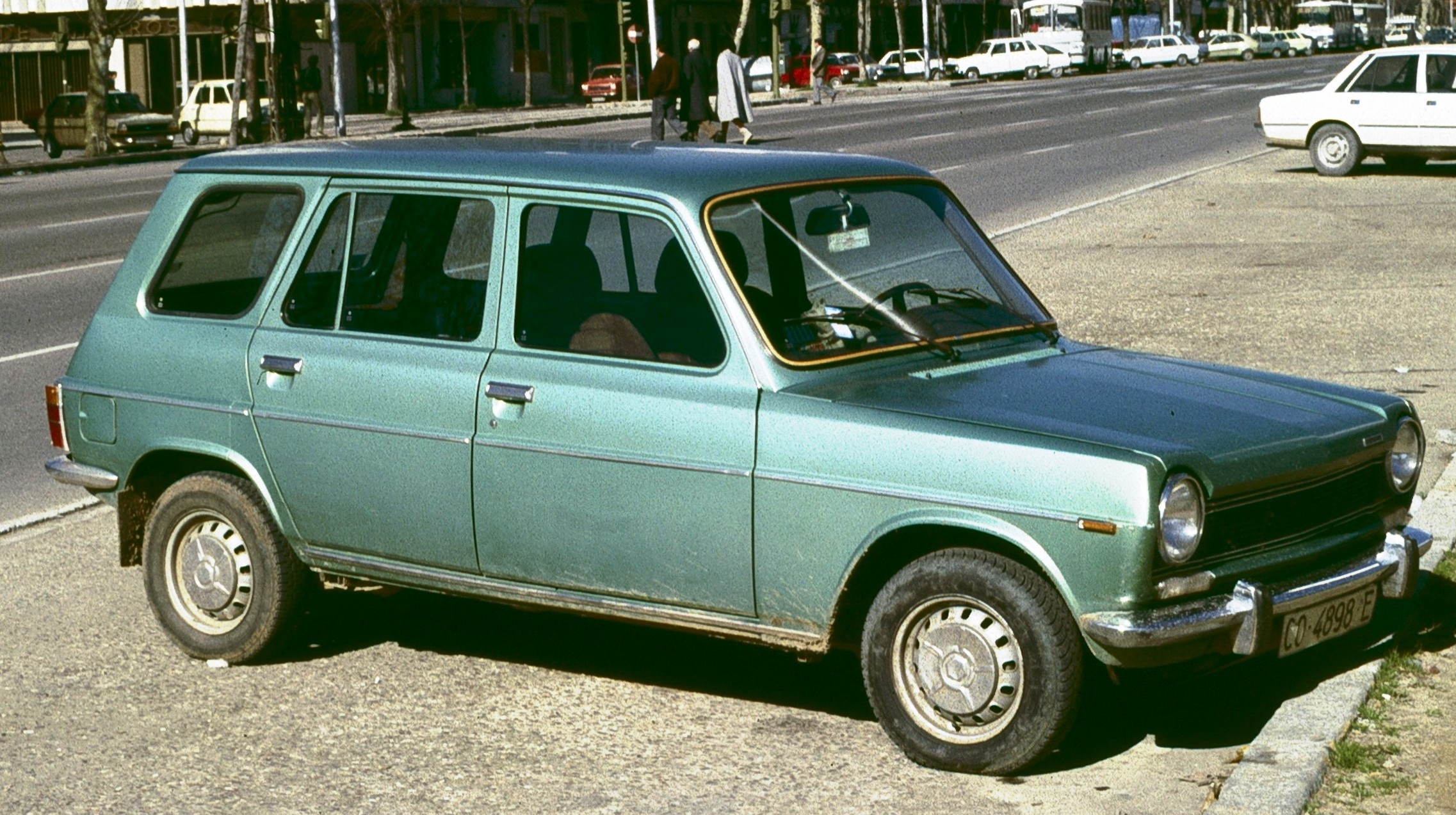
Simca 1200 GLS "Confort Break" (estate), made by Chrysler España (in Spain)

When first shown on Sardinia and at the Paris Auto Show in 1967, the 1100 was advanced in design, featuring a hatchback or wagon body, with folding rear seats, front disc brakes, rack and pinion steering, all-around independent front (double wishbones) and rear (semi-trailing arm) suspension, using front and rear torsion bar springs and anti-roll bars.

Numerous permutations were available, with a manual, automatic, or semi-automatic transmission. The engine was slanted to allow for a lower bonnet; and the engine, gearbox, and suspension were carried on a subframe to allow the unibody to be relatively unstressed. The body was welded to the frame, not bolted. The 1100 was reportedly studied closely by Volkswagen when the latter company was designing its Volkswagen Golf, after having made exclusively rear-engined, rear-wheel-drive vehicles for nearly 25 years, from restarting production of the pre-war developed VW Beetle, until launching the NSU-developed K70 in 1970.

The "Break", or 1100 four-door 'estate' models were no longer than the hatchbacks, just boxier in shape, and thus more spacious and practical.

== History ==
The 1100 was the result of "Project 928", started in 1962, finalized by engineers Philippe Grundeler and Charles Scales. The design was a result of Simca's market research in the early 1960s, which showed the increasing popularity of front wheel drive cars, that provided better comfort and space utilization in small cars.

In Spring 1962, Simca organized a project for a new, 1966/67 launch platform for a range of front wheel drive cars, with saloons, estates cars and light commercial vehicles to be included, all fitting into France's 6CV tax class – between the Simca Mille and the Simca 1300 saloon.

Both transverse and longitudinal engine placement were tested, and in 1963 the transverse-engine design was approved. The Simca 1100 was one of the first designs outside Fiat to feature a transverse engine with an end-on gearbox and unequal length driveshafts – now near-universal amongst small cars – a possible result of Fiat's influence as a major shareholder.

With a modest vehicle length growth of 15 cm (6 in), but a very significantly 30 cm (12 in) longer wheelbase, and over 10 cm (4 in) greater width and height, the new 1100 offered much better interior seating space than the barely shorter small Simca 1000.

In 1963, Chrysler took a controlling interest in Simca, approving the project to progress in 1964, with a production target of summer 1967. The short timetable included developing a new transmission, and making a larger version of the rear engined, rear-wheel drive Simca 1000 "Poissy" engine, now displacing 1,118 cc (68 cu in) – up 160 cc (10 cu in) from the 944 cc (58 cu in) "1.0 litre" unit used in the 1000 ('Mille'), while the 1500 used a 1.5 L (92 cu in) engine.

Later, a Simca 1200, with 1,204 cc (73 cu in), and a Simca 1300, with 1,294 cc (79 cu in) were added, while the old "1000" was also made available, as an even more affordable and frugal option.

Having increased their stake to 77% of Simca in 1963 and taken control of the Rootes Group by mid-1964, Chrysler had already marketed numerous Simca and Rootes models in the United States, including the Simca 1204, via a new Simca-Rootes Division, formed in 1966 — with 850 dealers selling four Simca models and 400 dealers selling four Rootes models. Results were dismal, and in late 1969, Chrysler announced it would henceforth market its Rootes and Simca products from its Chrysler-Plymouth Division. The Simca 1204 was imported to the United States through 1971, marketed next to another captive import, the Plymouth Cricket, at its Plymouth dealerships.

== Models ==
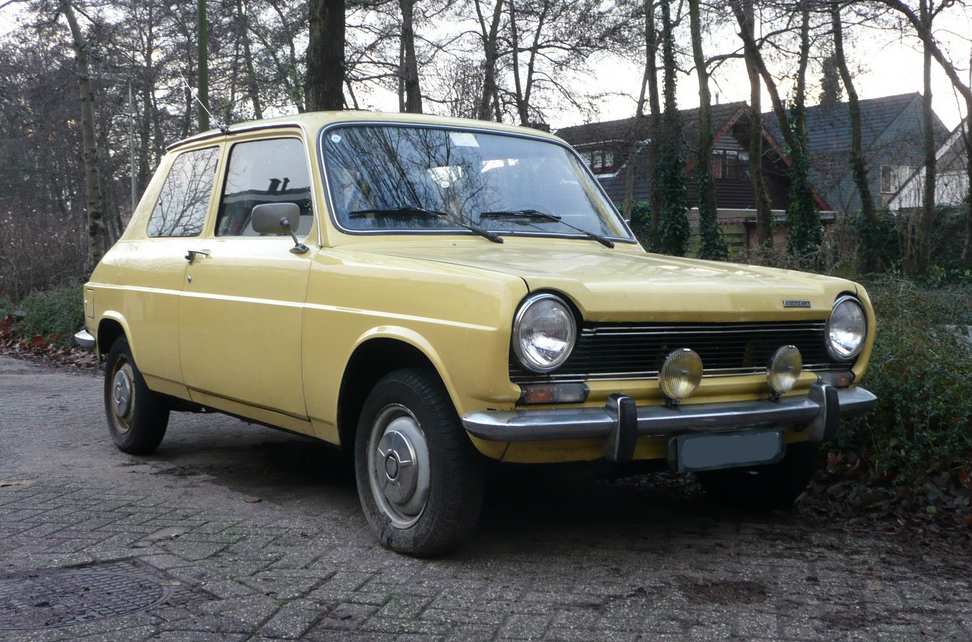
1974 Simca 1100 LS 3-door

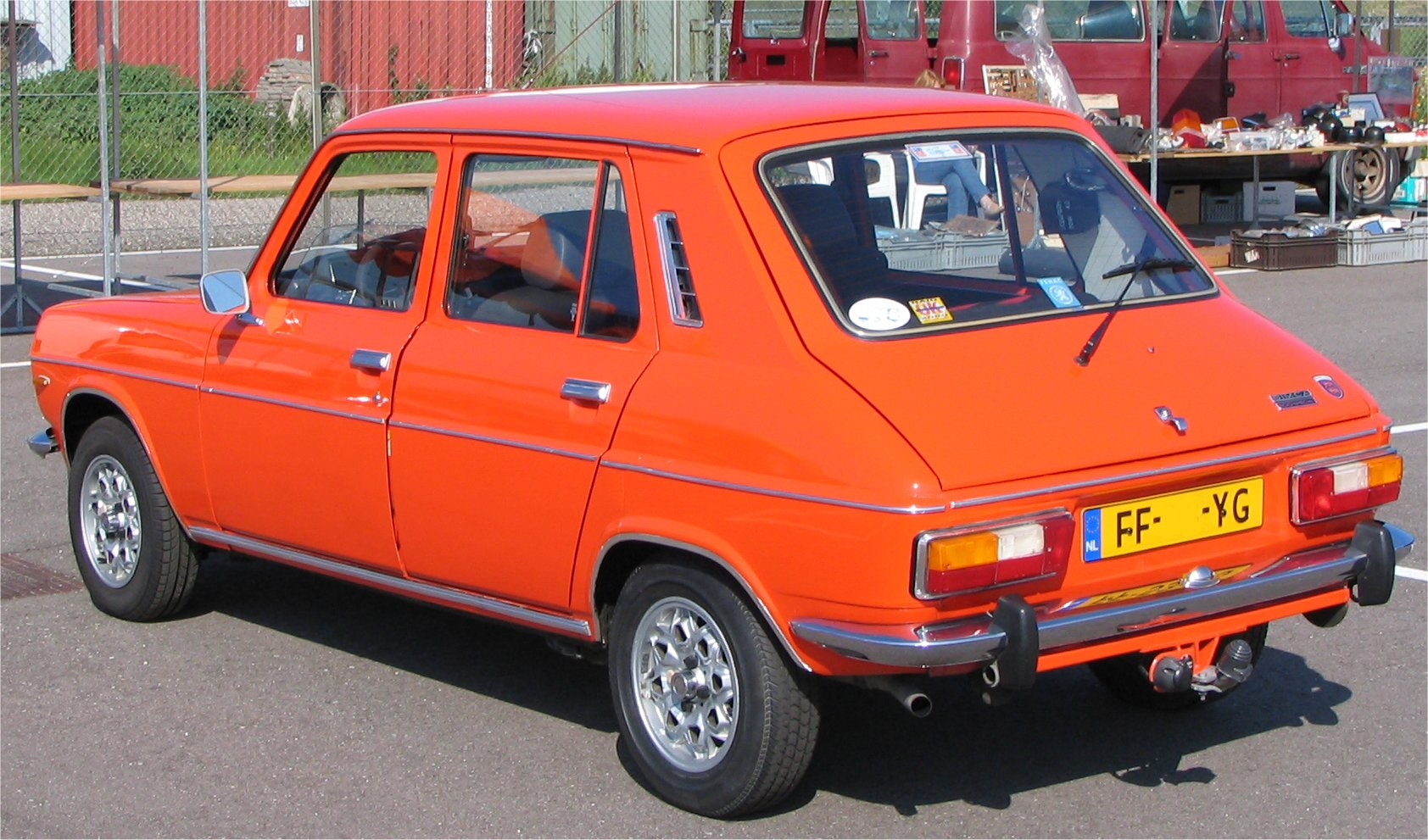
Simca 1100 five-door "Special"

The 1967 Simca 1100 was one of the first hatchback designs to enter production with a folding rear seat, and in four body versions: three and five-door hatchbacks, as well as an equal-length wagon (until 1970 with two doors, from 1970 with four doors), and a delivery van variant. It was similar in concept to an earlier French car, the Renault 16, which had been launched two years prior in the higher 'D' market segment and still used a longitudinal front mid-mounted engine, with the gearbox in front of it like a number of earlier front-wheel drive cars, including the original mass-produced hatchback, the 1961 Renault 4. When Renault then launched their "new" C-segment Renault 6 a year later, in 1968, it largely followed the design choices of the 1100, although the engine-transmission set up remained that of the Renault 4.

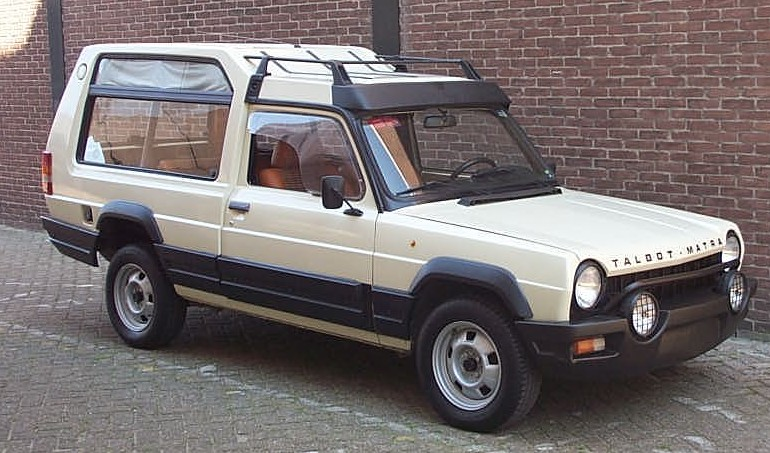
Matra Rancho right / front

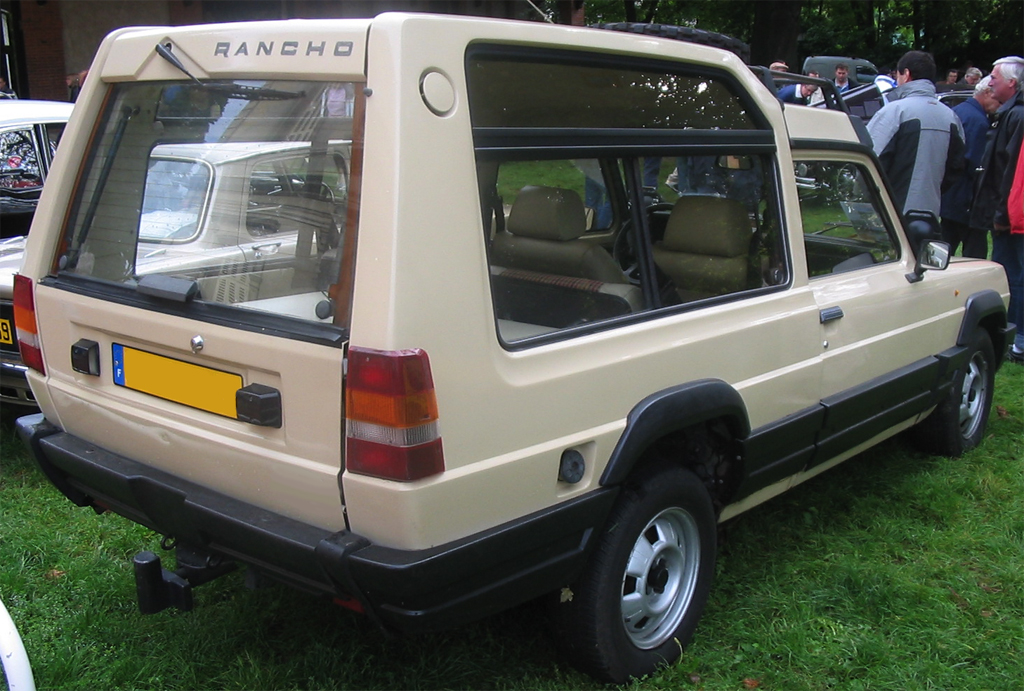
Matra Rancho right / rear

Different equipment levels were defined as LS, GL, GLS and "Special" tags. The car was fitted with Simca Type 315 petrol OHV "Poissy engines" with 944, 1118, and 1294 cc variants, depending on year and market. A "stroked" 1118 cc engine displacing 1.2 litres was introduced in 1971 to the UK market as the Simca 1204. This badge and engine was also used in the US, where the car sold in limited quantities, beginning in 1969. The larger 1204 cc engine used in North America produces 62 hp (46 kW; 63 PS); both the hatchback and station wagon models were offered. The car was not successful in America and Simca left the U.S. market in 1972. In 1974, the sporty TI appeared with the 1294 cc engine producing 82 PS (60 kW); at the same time the car also saw a cosmetic redesign. Based on the 1100 chassis, the Matra engineering firm created an early, light family crossover derivation, variously named (Talbot) Matra (Simca) Rancho.

The 1100 had a four-speed manual gearbox and room for five people. There was also a three-speed semi-automatic gearbox that required manual shifting but used an electronically activated clutch. The 1100s transmission configuration was the same as the one introduced by Fiat on the 1964 Autobianchi Primula, in that it was transverse and axial with the engine giving the "engine on one side, transmission on the other" layout copied on almost all "hatchbacks" and front wheel drive vehicles throughout the world ever since. In France, the 1100 was very successful, achieving best-seller status, but it was less competitive in non-European export markets.

=== The first Hot Hatch ===
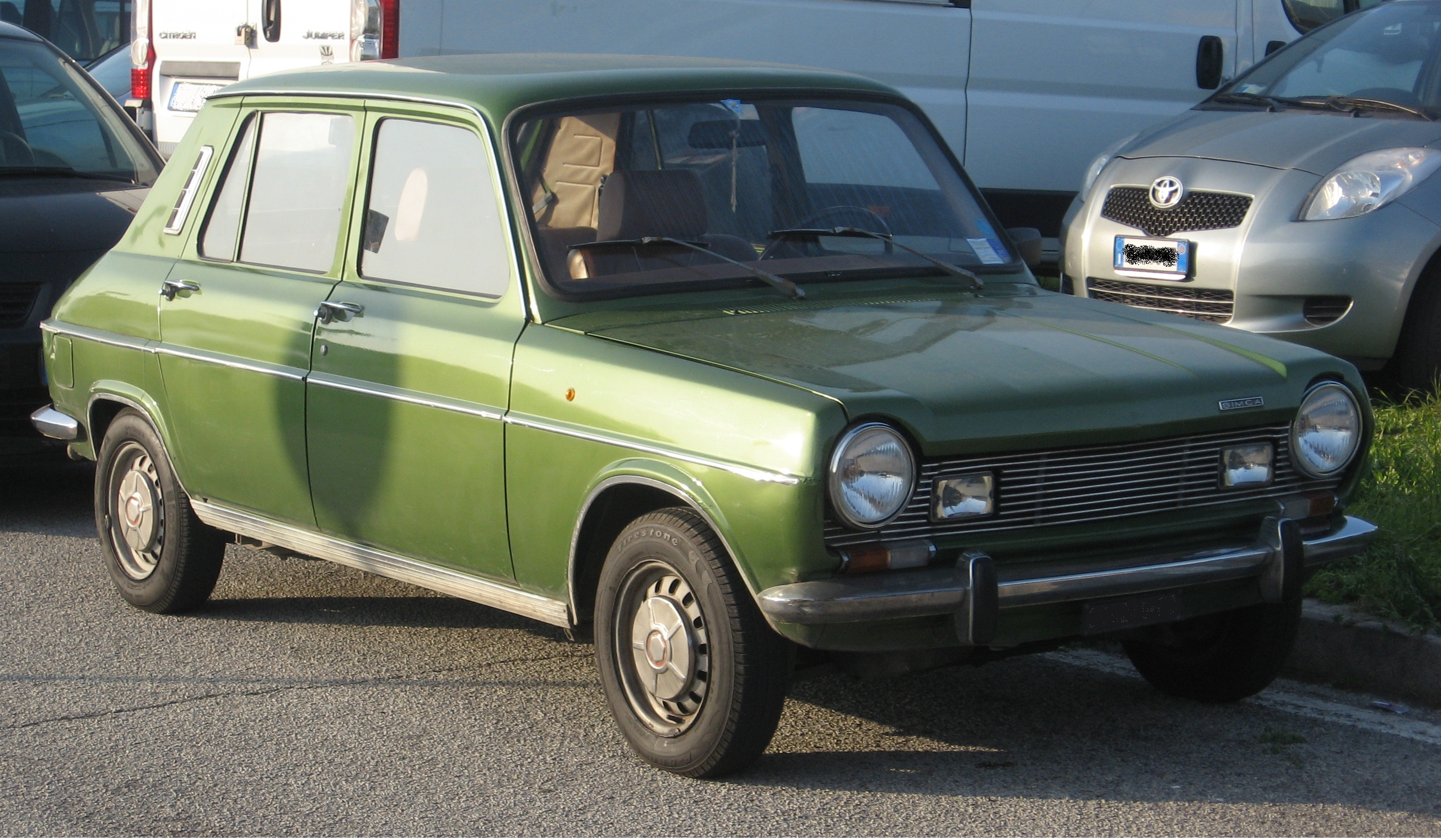
Simca's 1974 1100 Ti 'hot hatch'

One of the cars with the strongest claim as "the first Hot Hatch" was the Simca 1100 Ti, available from 1974, with 82 horsepower – over 40% more power than the standard 58 hp – which dramatically improved performance. It sent the car's top speed over 160 km/h (100 mph) for the first time, to 169 km/h (105 mph), and gave it a 0–60 mph (97 km/h) acceleration in 12 seconds. Based on the 1100 Special, introduced in 1970, distinguishing features of this performance version were its six-headlight and foglight arrangement, front disc brakes, front and rear spoilers, alloy wheels, matte black grille and single paint colour choice (red), items which would be adopted by the many 'hot hatchbacks' that would follow.

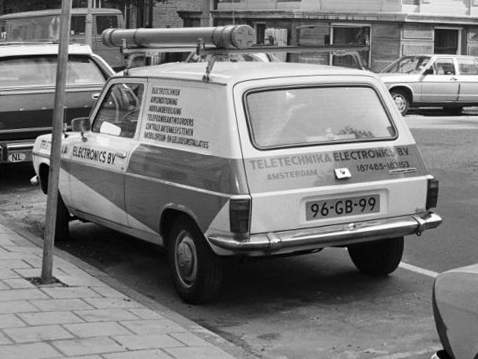
Simca 1100 Fourgonnette (VF1) two-door estate panel van

Another early hot hatch was the Renault 5 Alpine (called Gordini in the U.K. due to Chrysler owning the Alpine model name there) which first went on sale in May 1976 and also pre-dated sales of the Volkswagen Golf GTi, by two months. The 1100Ti was never sold in RHD in the UK.

=== Light Commercial Van variants ===
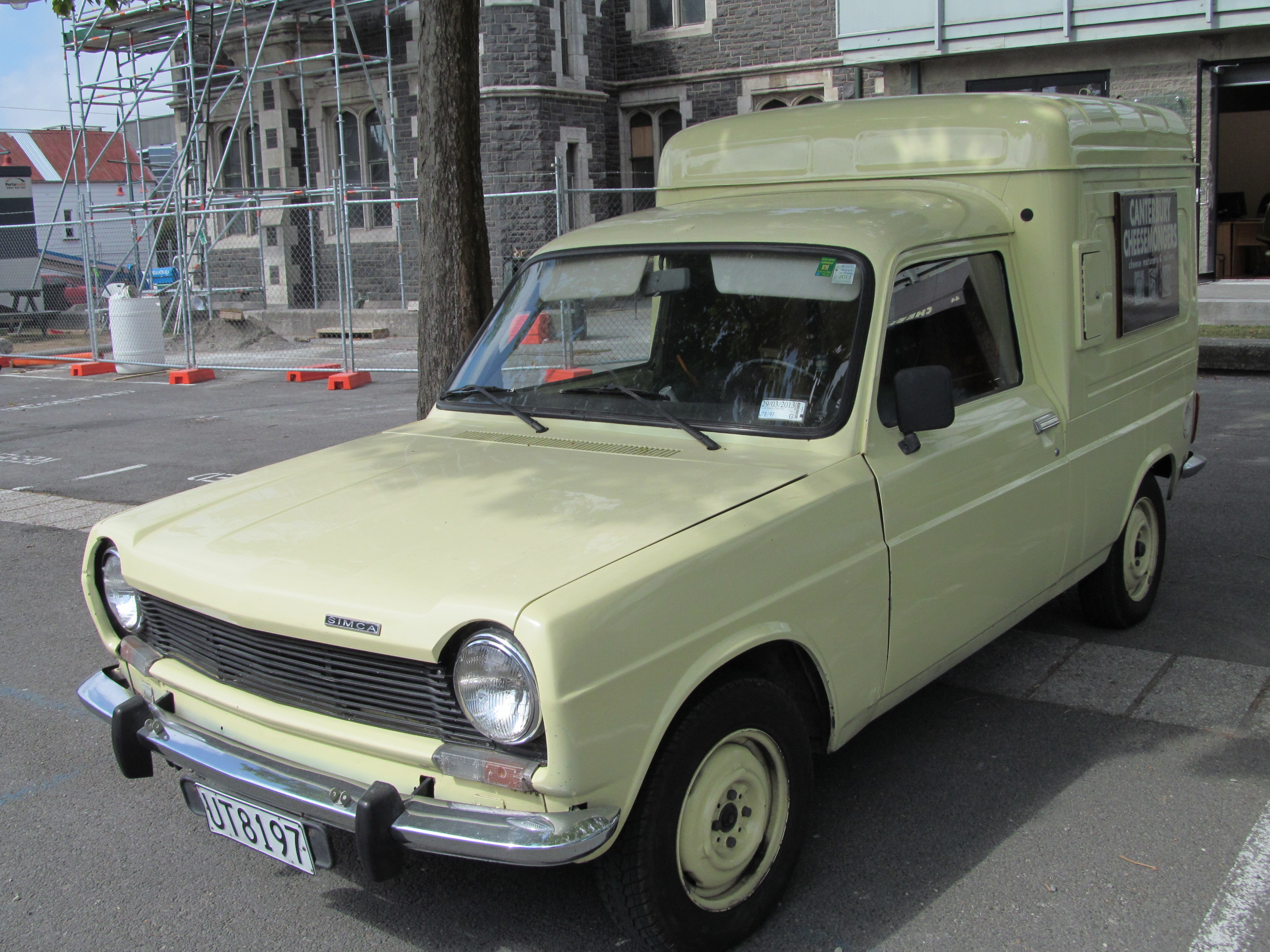
1979 Simca 1100 VF2 delivery van

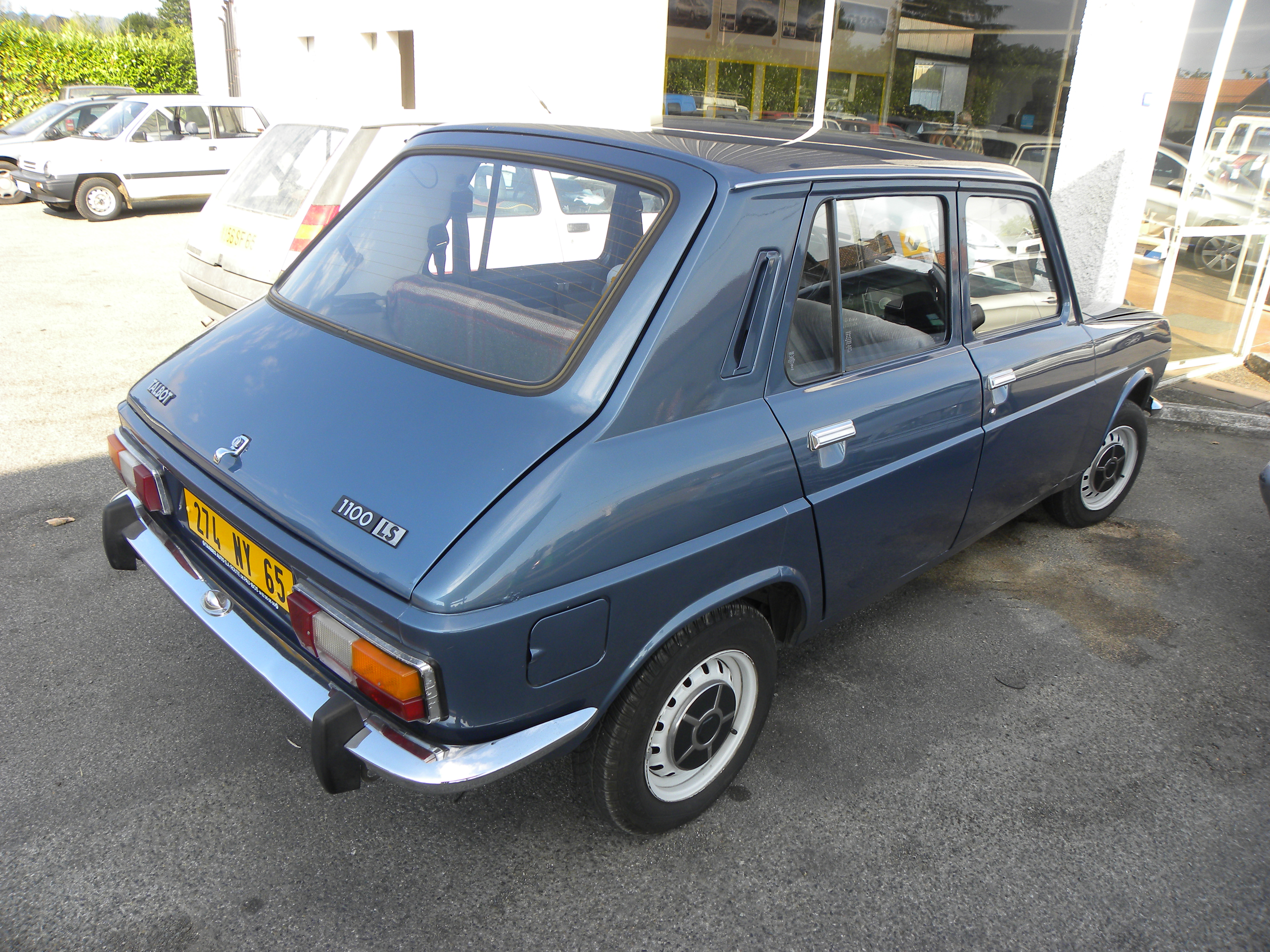
Talbot badged 1100 LS

Three light commercial vehicle (LCV) variants, a two-door wagon-based panel van and high top van, and a car-based pick up bodystyle were also available. These were sold in most European markets – in France and some other countries as the Simca 1100 "Fourgonnette". Commercial versions lasted until the spring of 1985, three years after the 1100 passenger car models had been removed from the market.

In the UK, the two-door wagon based, normal or "low"-roof panel-van was called the VF1, (short for "Voiture Fourgonnette" or (delivery) van), the high-roof van was called the Simca VF2 and was sold from December 1972, while an even higher roofed version, introduced for 1978 became the VF3. A pick-up model arrived in December 1975.

In the United Kingdom, commercial models assumed the Dodge nameplate after 1976 and were called Talbots after 1979. The commercial models were sold as 'Simca Fixaren' ("the fixer"; it was renamed Talbot after a short while) in Sweden, where they were fitted with a 66 PS (49 kW) version of the 1.3 litre engine.

In addition to the dedicated van models, there was also a two-seater commercial version of the three-door hatchback available to French customers from December 1976. This, the 50 PS (37 kW) 1100 AS (for Affaires et Societés, businesses and companies) qualified for a considerably lower tax rate.

== Commercial ==
During the first full year of production 1968, volumes were already strong with 138,242 vehicles made. Importantly, the additional sales volume appears to have come mostly at the expense of competing manufacturers: overall Simca production surged from 251,056 cars in 1967 to 350,083 in 1968, and volumes for the slightly smaller Simca 1000 remained nearly identical in each of these two years.

Production peaked in 1973, with nearly 300,000 Simca 1100s rolling off the assembly line. However, production fell rapidly through 1977, when over 142,000 1100s were made, and in 1978 (with the Chrysler Horizon launched in February 1978), just half that number (72,695) of Simca 1100s was made. Volumes dwindled to below 20,000 in 1981 which was the last year of production in France, though in Spain production continued through to 1982 of the car and 1985 for the van version.

== Production ==
The Simca 1100 was also produced outside France: in Madrid (Spain) at the former Barreiros Diesel factory. Spanish-built 1100s were marketed as the Simca 1200 and the TI version had an 85 PS (63 kW; 84 hp) 1442 cc engine.

A total of 2.2 million cars were produced. The replacement for the 1100, the C2 project, was unveiled at the end of 1977 as the Chrysler Horizon - Chrysler's "world car" - and was an enormous success in the United States, where it sold as the Dodge Omni and Plymouth Horizon. In Europe it was briefly sold as the Chrysler Horizon in the UK and the Simca Horizon in the rest of Europe, before being rebranded as a Talbot following Peugeot's takeover of Chrysler Europe. The 1100 remained in production alongside it in France until 1982 and elsewhere until 1985, also under the Talbot brand.

The 1100 was also the basis for the Matra Rancho, an early crossover which had a genuine offroad appearance but was built on the front-wheel drive Simca 1100 basis.

Range

- 944 cc - 45 PS (33 kW)
- 1118 cc - 50/52/60 PS (37/38/44 kW)
- 1204 cc - 59 PS (43 kW)
- 1294 cc - 62/75 PS (46/55 kW) - 66 PS (49 kW) in the Swedish market
- 1442 cc - 83 PS (61 kW) (Spanish market "Simca 1200" only)

== See also ==
- Hot hatch
