= Antonis Volanis =

Greek industrial designer (born c. 1948)

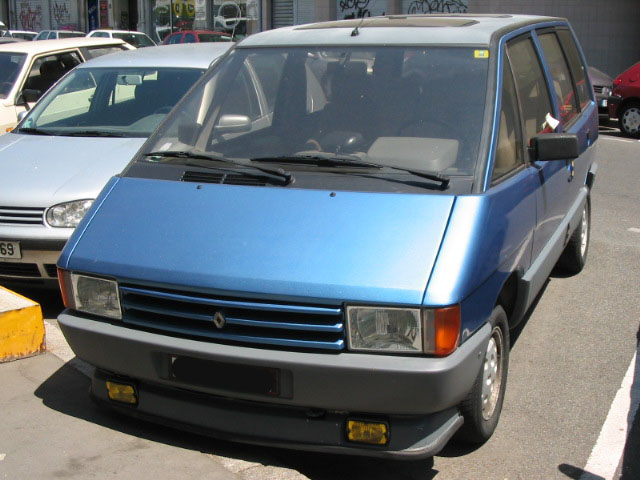
The Renault Espace is the most famous masterpiece of Volanis

Antonis Volanis (also known as Antoine Volanis; Greek: Αντώνης Βολάνης) is a Greek industrial designer, born in Thessaloniki in 1948. He has mainly worked in France (since 1968), where he cooperated with Peugeot, Matra (he is the designer of the Bagheera, Rancho and Murena), Renault (designer of the Espace), Aérospatiale, Tefal, Donnay (sports goods) and many others. He was also instrumental in the design development of the revolutionary LOOK KG196, a French carbon monocoque racing bicycle, on which his trademark decal appears. He established Design Volanis S.A. in Paris which has also cooperated with a number of other European carmakers and industrial corporations.
