= Minivan =

Type of van designed for private use

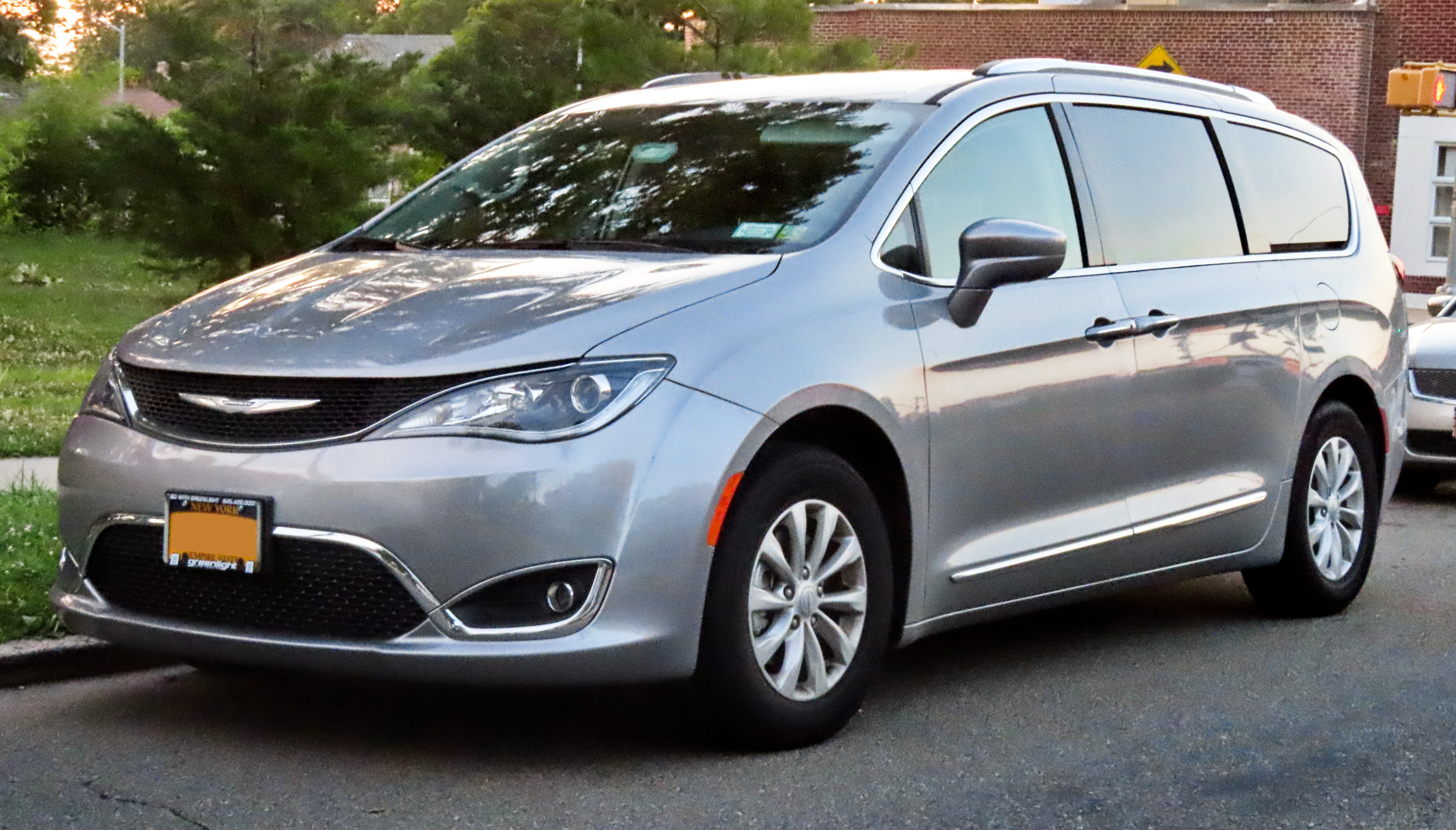
The Chrysler Pacifica, the best-selling minivan in the United States as of 2025

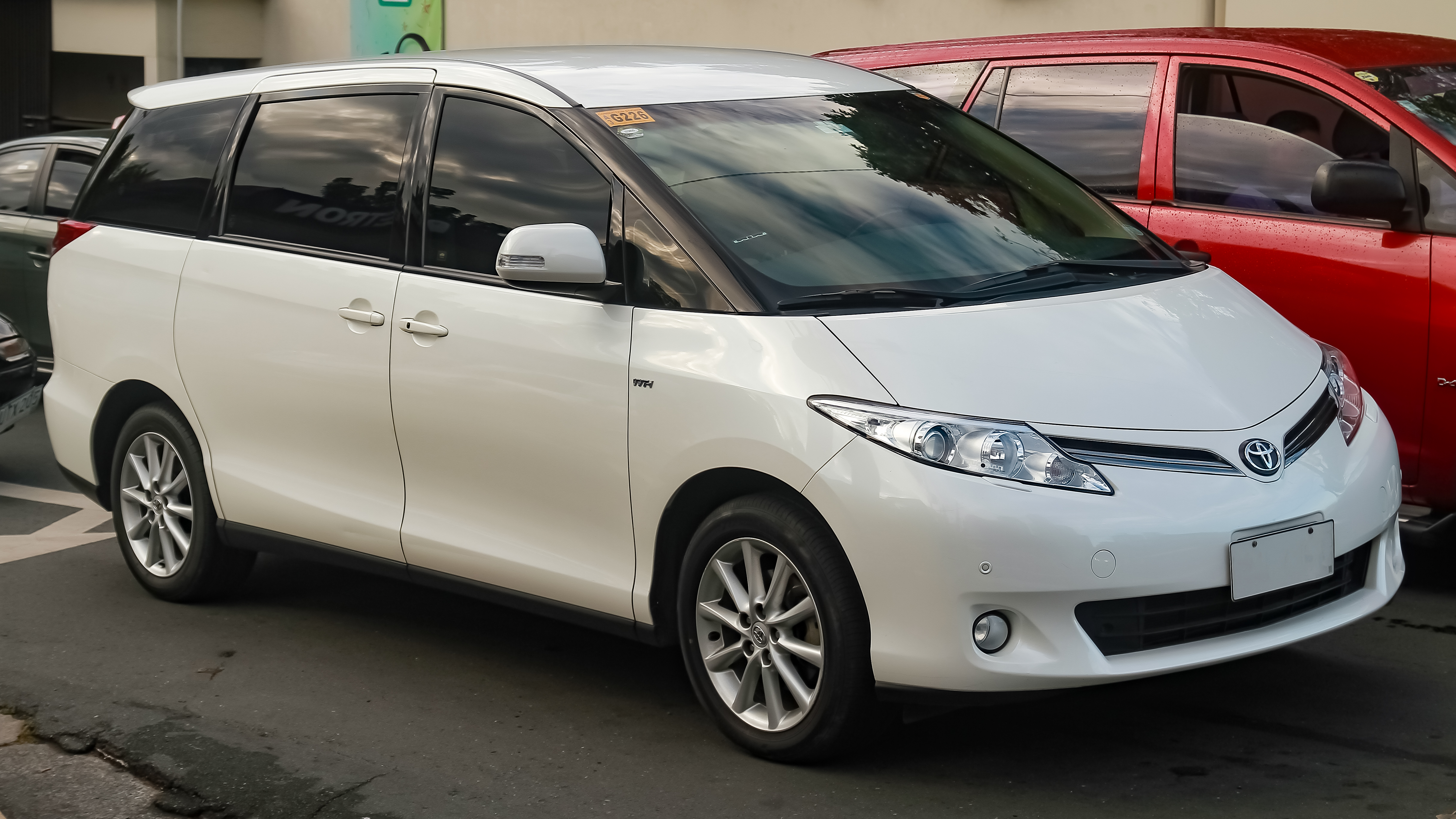
The Toyota Previa, 3rd generation

A minivan, commonly known as a van, is a car classification for vehicles designed to transport passengers in the rear seating row(s), with reconfigurable seats in two or three rows. The equivalent classification in Europe is MPV (multi-purpose vehicle), people carrier, or M-segment.

Compared with a full-size van, most minivans are based on a passenger car platform and have a lower body. Early models, such as the Ford Aerostar and Chevrolet Astro, utilized a compact pickup truck platform.

Minivans often feature a 'one-box' or 'two-box' body configuration, a higher roof, a flat floor, sliding doors for rear passengers, and high 'H-point' seating. The largest minivan size is also referred to as 'Large MPV' and became popular following the introduction of the 1984 Dodge Caravan and Renault Espace. Typically, these are based on platforms derived from D-segment passenger cars or compact pickups. Since the 1990s, the smaller compact MPV and mini MPV sizes of minivans have also become popular.

Although predecessors to the minivan date back to the 1930s, the contemporary minivan body style was developed concurrently by several companies in the early 1980s, most notably by Chrysler (producer of the Chrysler minivans) and Renault (the Renault Espace), both of which were first sold in model year 1984. Minivans cut into and eventually overshadowed the traditional station wagon market, growing in global popularity and diversity throughout the 1990s. Since the 2000s, their reception has varied across the world. In North America, for example, they have been largely eclipsed by crossovers and SUVs, while in Asia, they are often marketed as luxury cars.

== Etymology ==
The term minivan originated in North America and the United Kingdom in 1959. In the UK, the Mini Van was a small van manufactured by the Austin Motor Company, based on the newly introduced Mini car. In the US, the term was used to differentiate the smaller passenger vehicles from full-size vans (such as the Ford E-Series, Dodge Ram Van, and Chevrolet Van), which were then called 'vans'.

The first known use of the term was in 1959, but it was not commonly used until the 1980s.

== Characteristics ==
=== Chassis ===
In contrast to larger vans, most modern minivans/MPVs use a front-engine, front-wheel drive layout, while some model lines offer all-wheel drive as an option (i.e. Toyota Sienna, Toyota Previa, Chrysler Pacifica). Alongside adopting the form factor introduced by Chrysler minivans, the configuration allows for less engine intrusion and a lower floor in the passenger compartment. In line with larger full-size vans, unibody construction has been commonly used (the spaceframe design of the Renault Espace and the General Motors APV minivans being exceptions).

Minivans/MPVs are produced on distinct chassis architecture or share platforms with other vehicles such as sedans and crossover SUVs. Minivans do not have as much ground clearance, towing capacity, or off-road capability compared to SUVs. Minivans provide more space for passengers and cargo than sedans and SUVs.

=== Body style ===
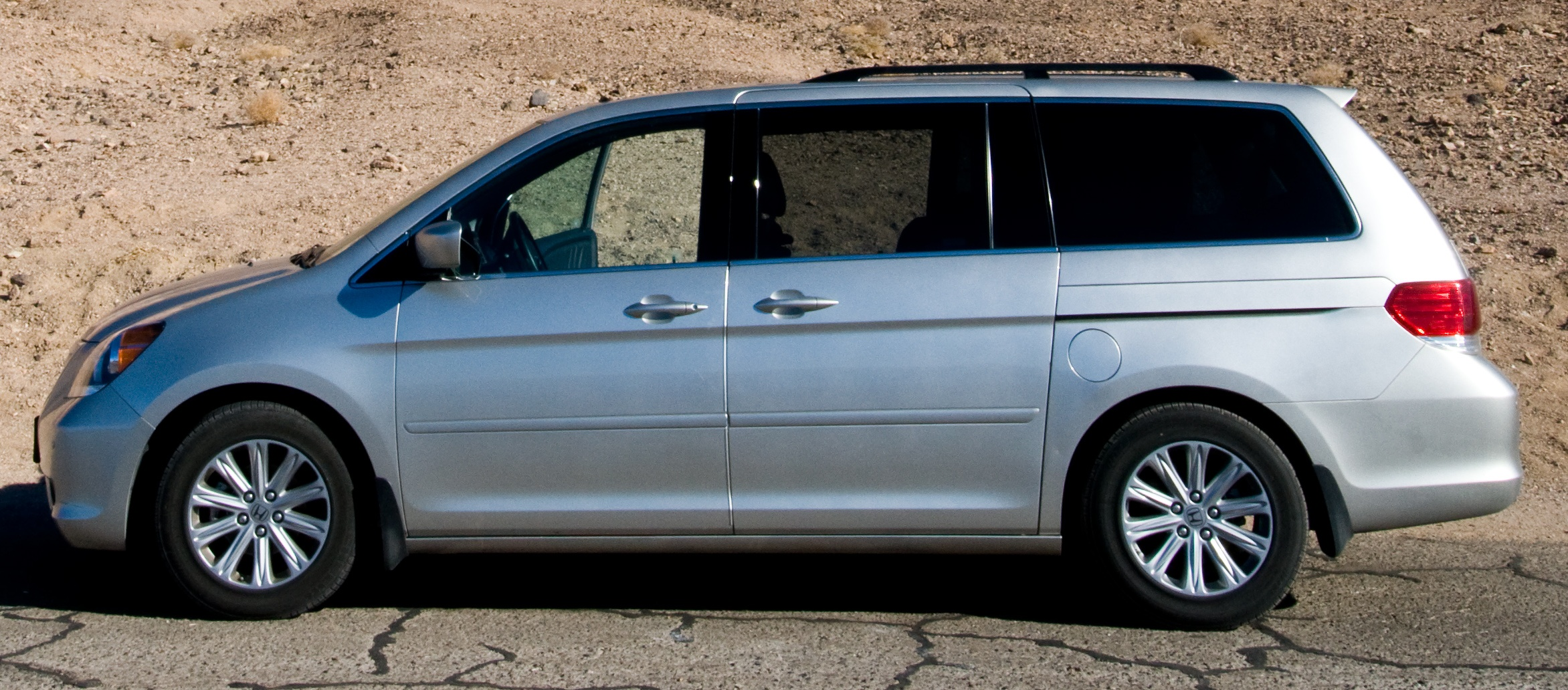
Side profile of a Honda Odyssey

Minivans/MPVs use either a two-box or a one-box body design with A, B, C, and D pillars. The cabin may be fitted with two, three, or four rows of seats, with the most common configurations being 2+3+2 or 2+3+3. Compared to other types of passenger vehicles, the body shape of minivans is designed to maximize interior space for both passengers and cargo. It is achieved by lengthening the wheelbase, creating a flatter floor, taller roof, and more upright side profile, but not as prominent as commercial-oriented vans that are boxier in profile. Practicality and comfort for passengers are also enhanced with a larger rear cargo space opening and larger windows.

Some minivans/MPVs may use sliding doors, while others offer conventional forward-hinged doors. Initially, a feature of the 1982 Nissan Prairie, the 1996 Chrysler minivans introduced a driver-side sliding door; by 2002, all minivans were sold with doors on both sides of the body. Most minivans are configured with a rear lift gate; few minivans have used panel-style rear doors, for example, cargo versions of the Chevrolet Astro, Ford Aerostar, and the Mercedes-Benz V-Class.

=== Interior ===
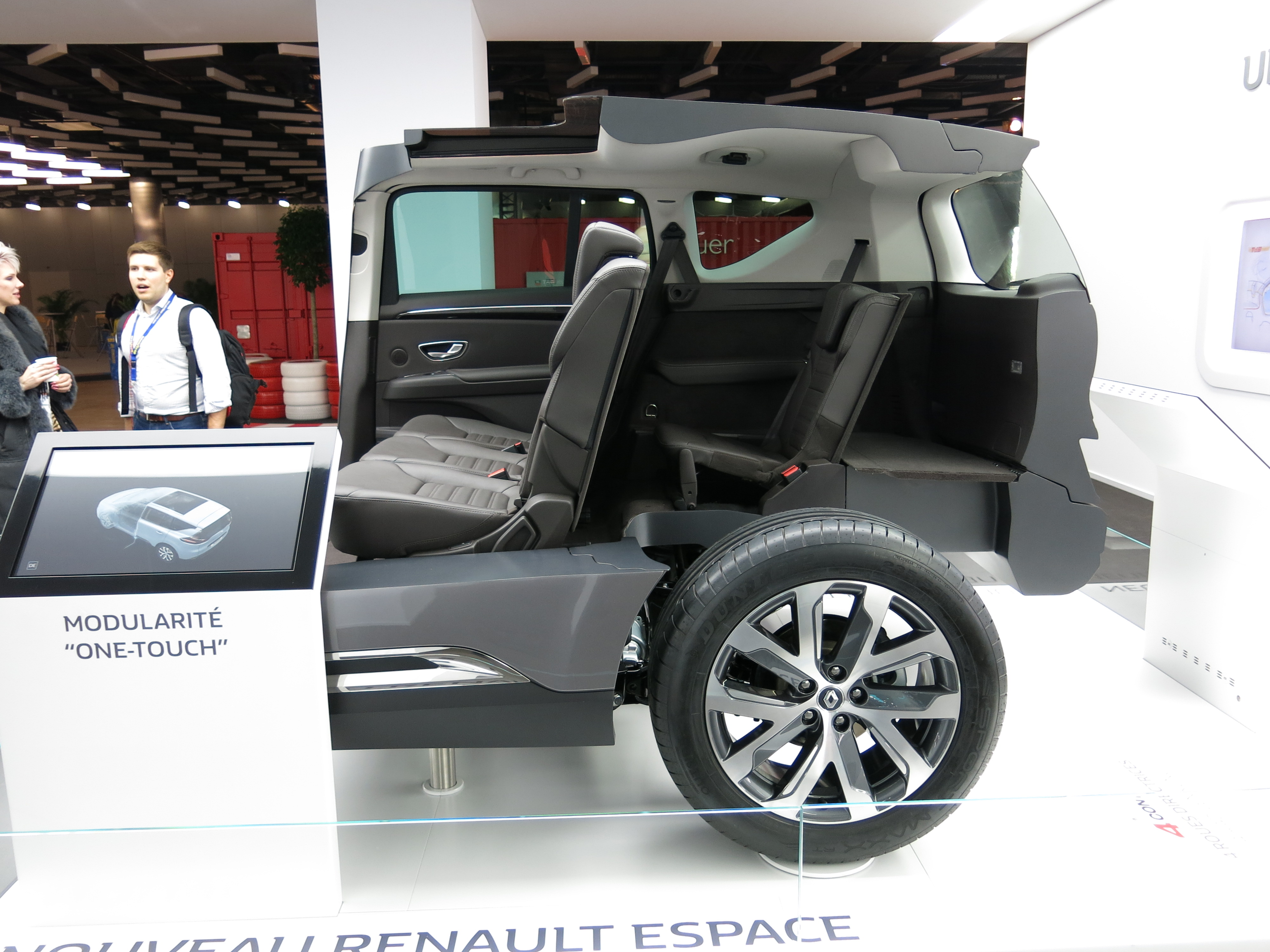
A cutaway Renault Espace V, showcasing its relatively flat floor and third-row seat space

Most minivans have a reconfigurable interior to carry passengers and their effects. The first examples were designed with removable rear seats unlatched from the floor for removal and storage (in line with larger vans); however, users gave poor reception to the design as many seats were heavy and hard to remove. In 1995, the Honda Odyssey was introduced with a third-row seat that folded flat into the floor, which was then adopted by many competitors, including Chrysler that introduced third-row and fold-flat second-row seats in 2005.

High-end minivans may include distinguished features such as captain seats or Ottoman seats, as opposed to bench seats for the second row.

== Predecessors ==
Before the adoption of the minivan term, there is a long history of one-box passenger vehicles roughly approximating the body style, with the 1936 Stout Scarab often cited as the first minivan. The passenger seats in the Scarab were moveable and could be configured for the passengers to sit around a table in the rear of the cabin. Passengers entered and exited the Scarab via a centrally mounted door.

The DKW Schnellaster—manufactured from 1949 until 1962—featured front-wheel drive, a transverse engine, a flat floor, and multi-configurable seating, all of which would later become characteristics of minivans.

In 1950, the Volkswagen Type 2 adapted a bus-shaped body to the chassis of a small passenger car (the Volkswagen Beetle). When Volkswagen introduced a sliding side door to the Type 2 in 1968, it then had the prominent features that would later come to define a minivan: compact length, three rows of forward-facing seats, station wagon-style top-hinged tailgate/liftgate, sliding side door, passenger car base.

The 1956–1969 Fiat Multipla also had many features in common with modern minivans. The Multipla was based on the chassis of the Fiat 600 and had a rear engine and cab forward layout.

The early 1960s saw Ford and Chevrolet introduce "compact" vans for the North American market, the Econoline Club Wagon and Greenbrier respectively. The Ford version was marketed in the Falcon series, the Chevrolet in the Corvair 95 series. The Econoline grew larger in the 1970s, while the Greenbrier was joined by (and later replaced by) the Chevy Van.

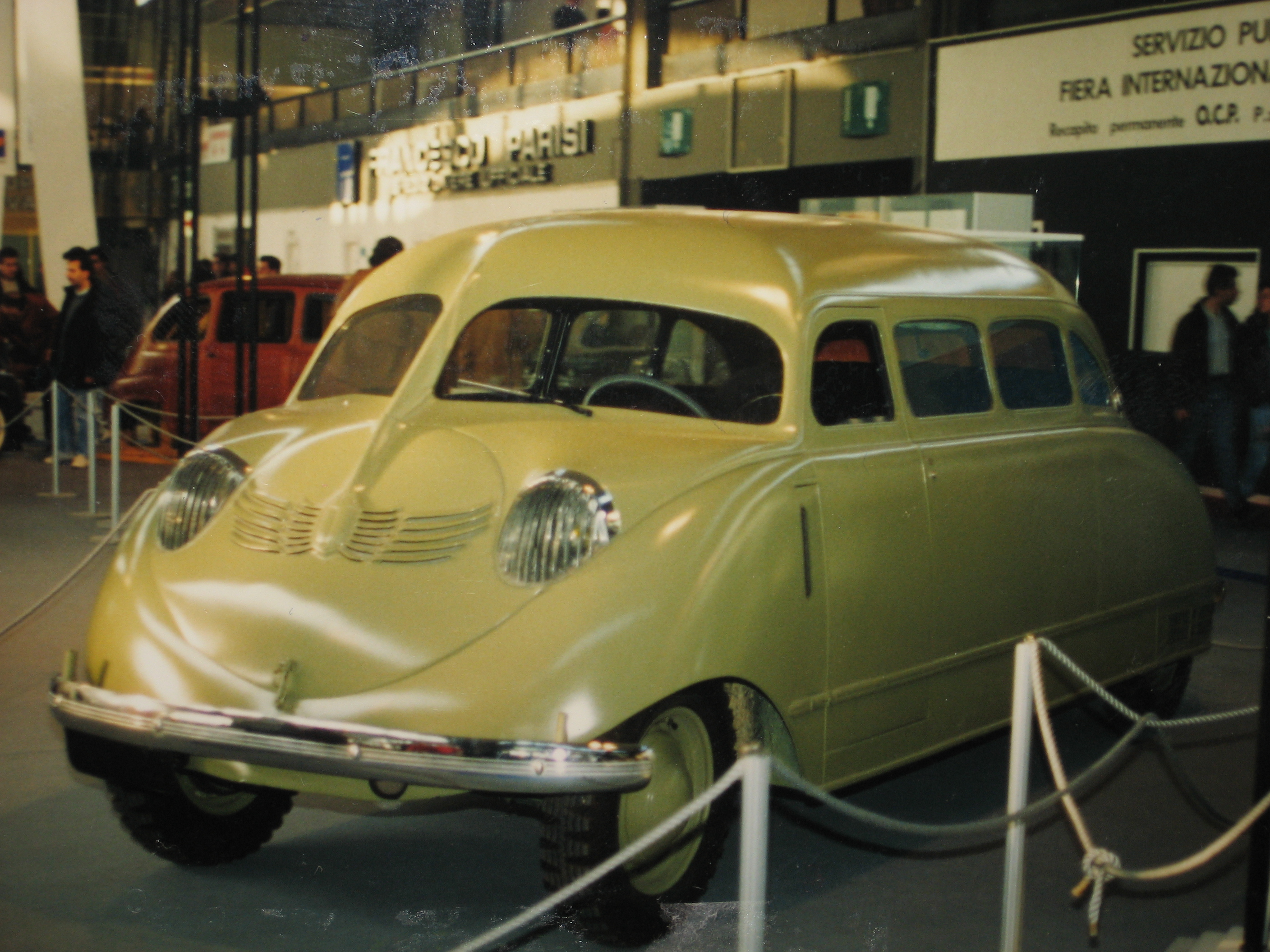
Stout Scarab
(1936–1942)

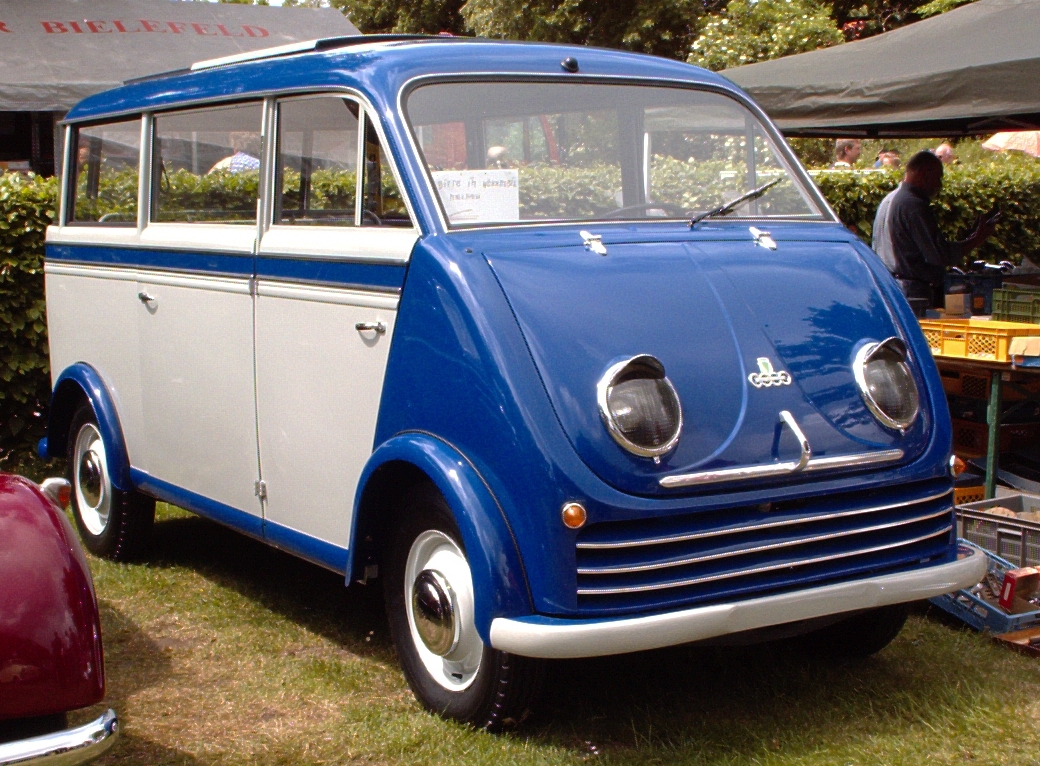
DKW Schnellaster
(1949–1962)

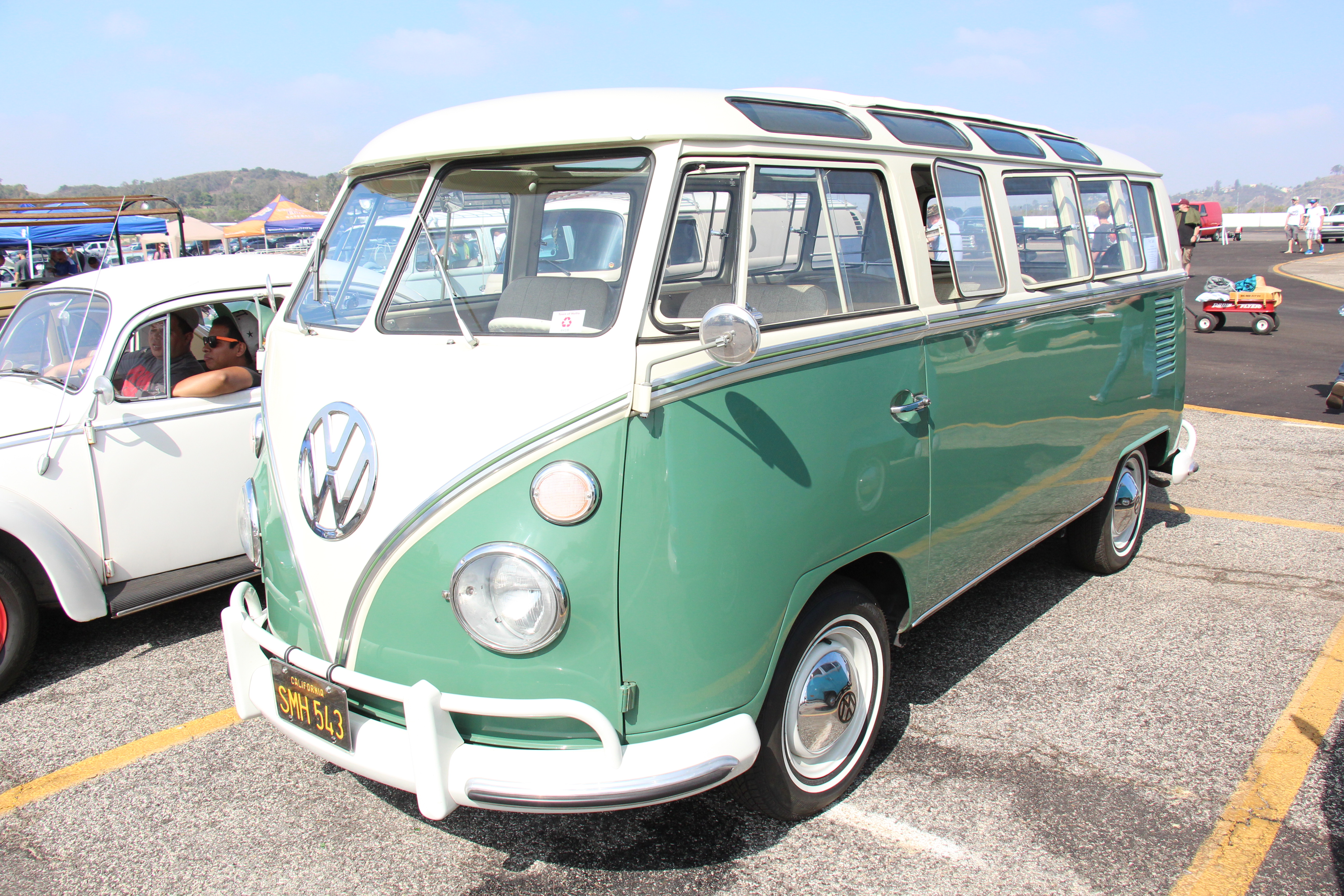
Volkswagen Type 2
(1950–1967)

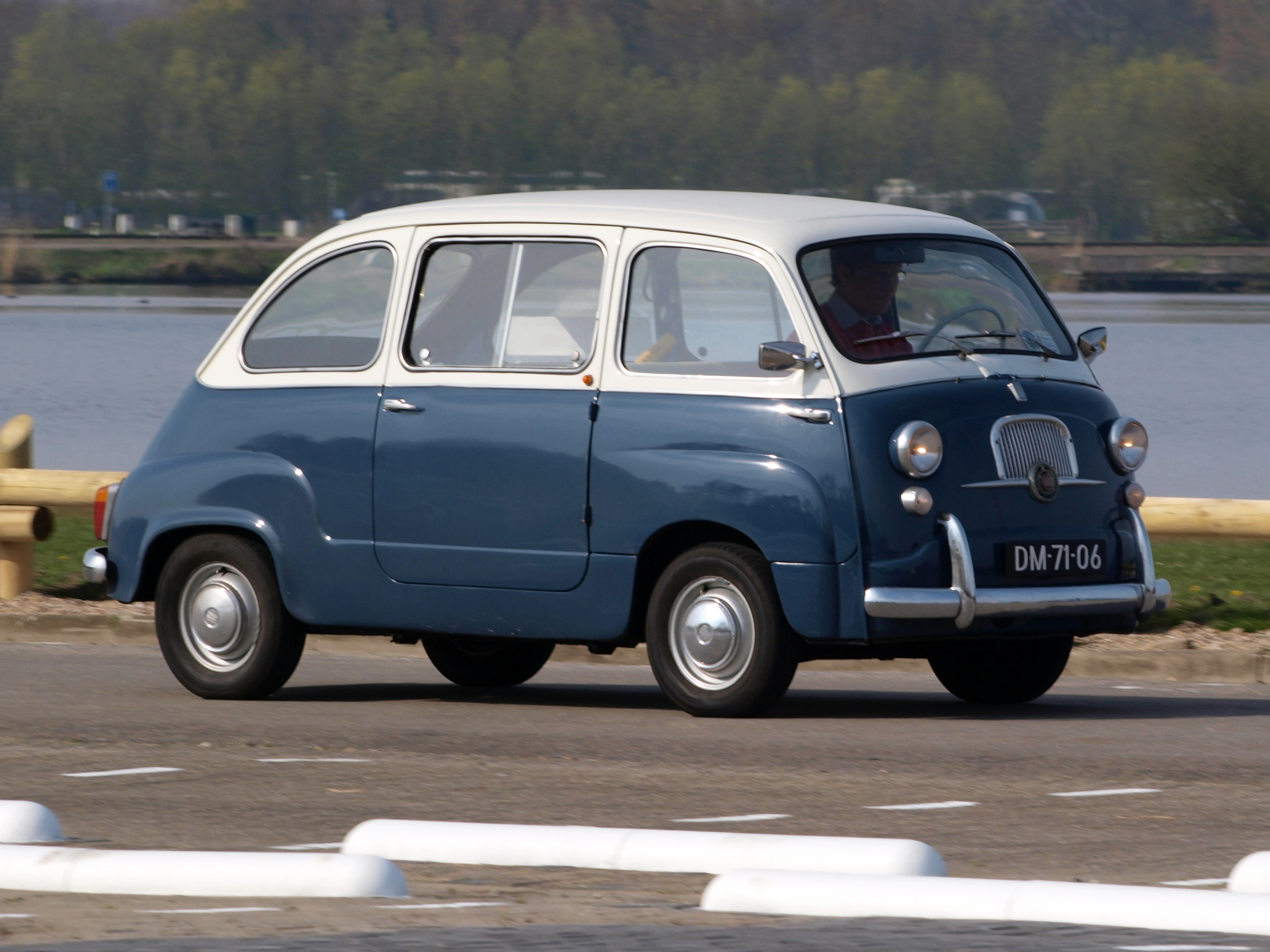
Fiat 600 Multipla
(1956–1969)

== North America ==
Due to their larger footprint and engines, minivans developed for the North American market are distinct from most minivans/MPVs marketed in other regions, such as Europe and Asia. As of 2020, average exterior length for minivans in North America ranged around 200 inches (5.08 m), while many models use V6 engines with more than 270 horsepower (201 kW; 274 PS) mainly to fulfill towing capacity requirements which North American customers demand.

In 2021, sales of the segment totalled 310,630 units in the U.S. (2.1% of the overall car market), and 33,544 in Canada (2.0% of the overall car market). As of 2022, the passenger-oriented minivan segment consists of the Toyota Sienna, Chrysler Pacifica, Chrysler Voyager, Honda Odyssey, and Kia Carnival.

Top 3 best-sellers in the U.S., 2021

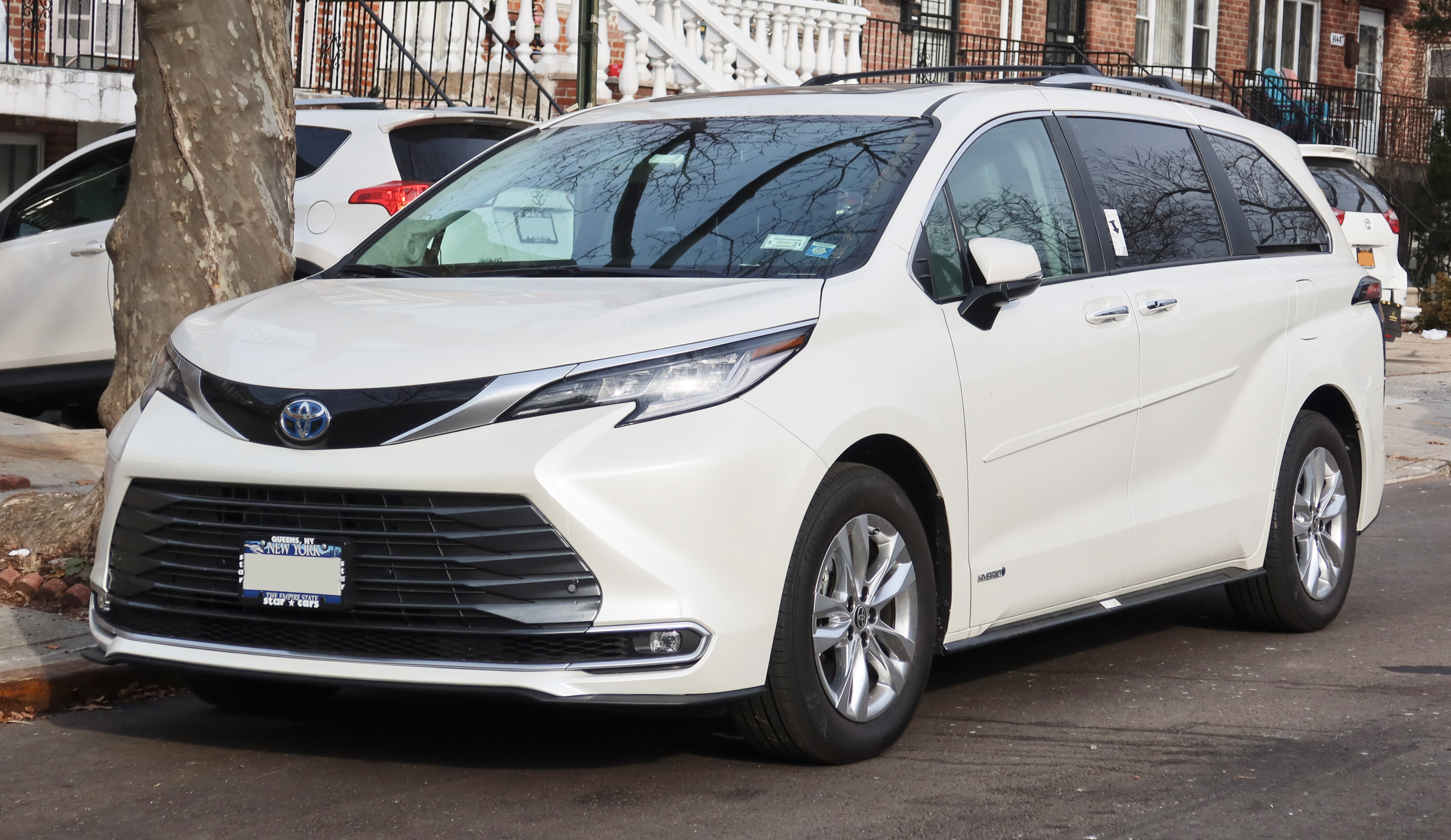
Toyota Sienna
(2020–present)

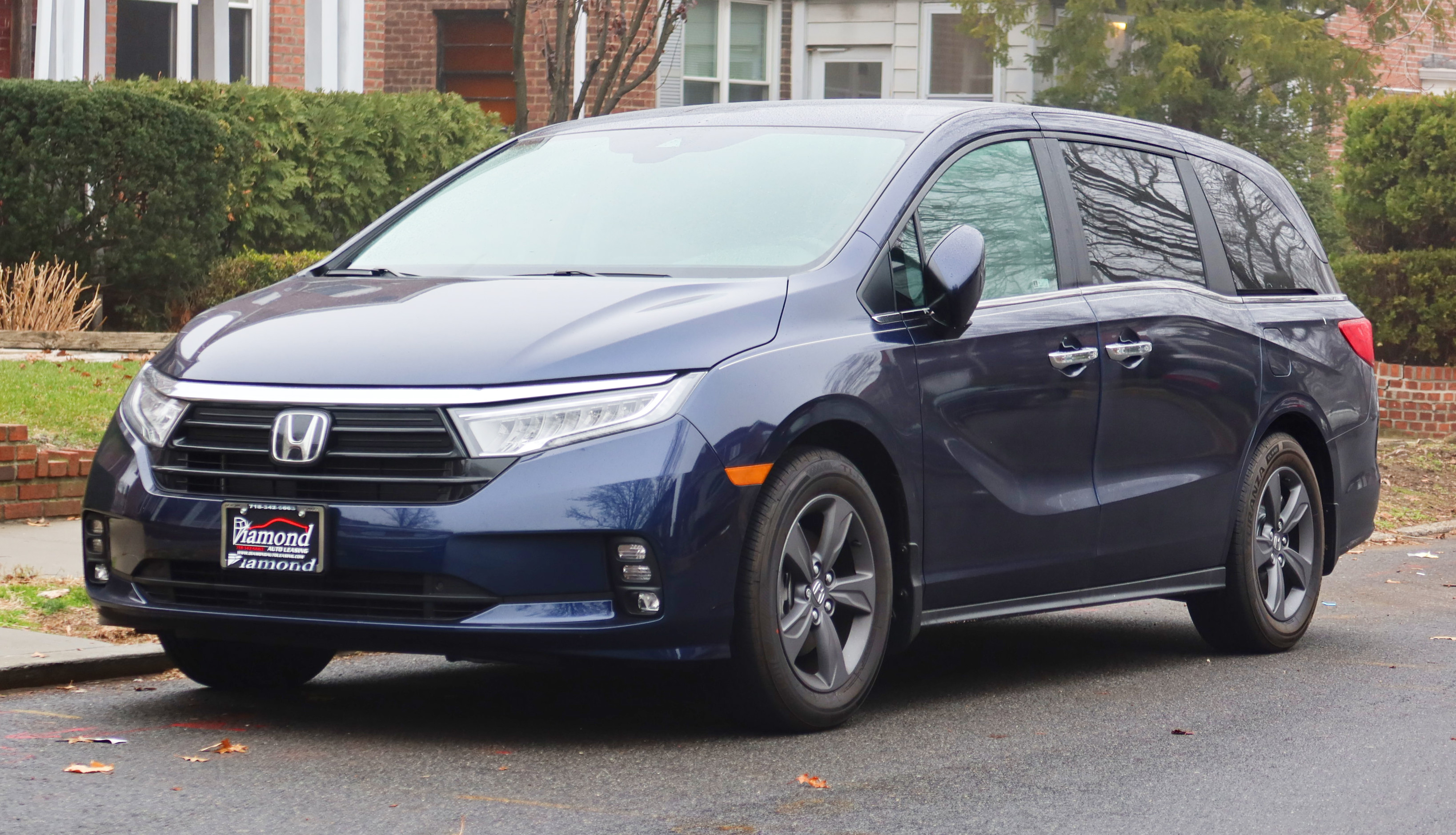
Honda Odyssey
(2018–present)

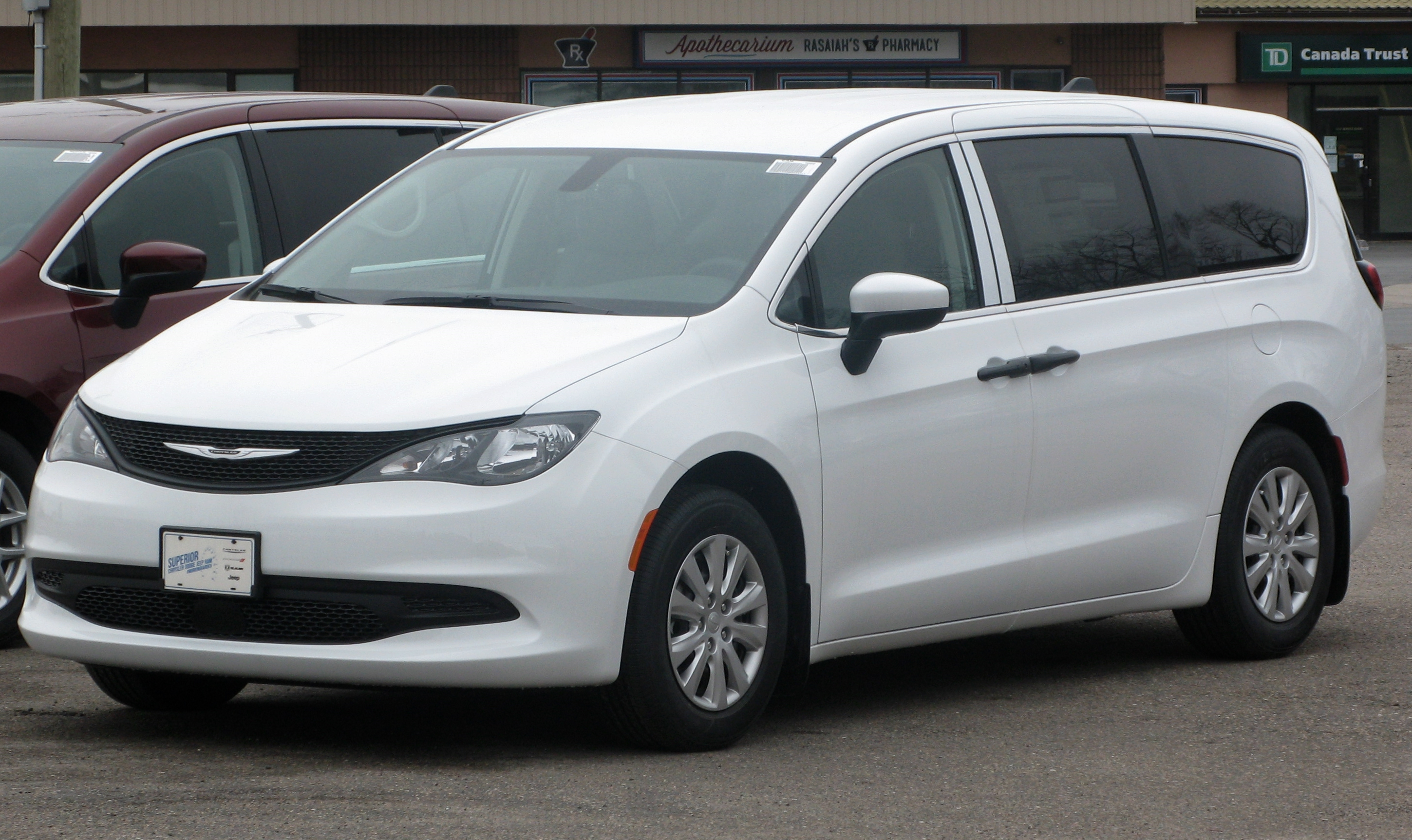
Chrysler Pacifica/Voyager
(2019–present)

=== History ===
==== 1970s and 1980s ====
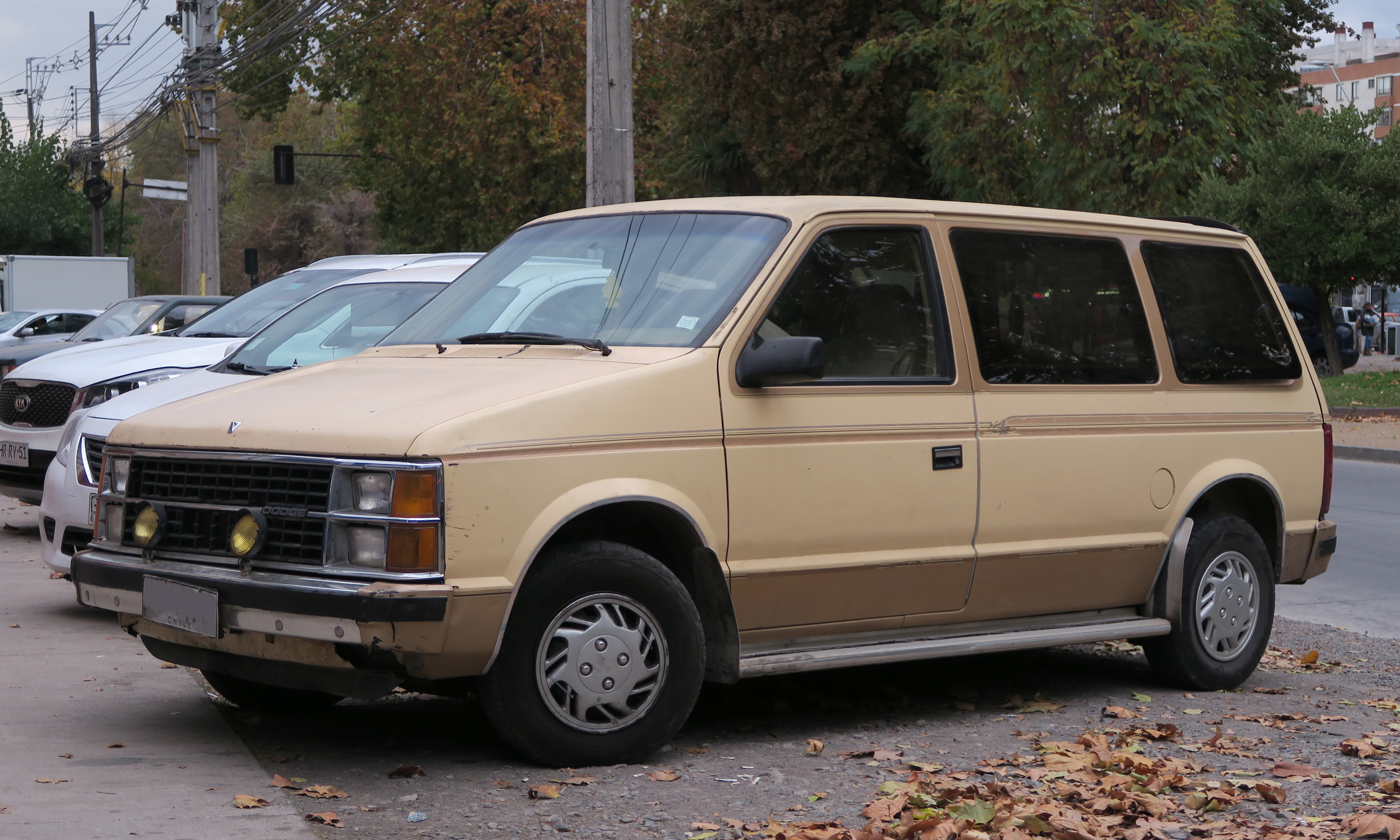
1985 Dodge Caravan

In the late 1970s, Chrysler began a development program to design "a small affordable van that looked and handled more like a car." The result of this program was the first American minivans based on the S platform, the 1984 Plymouth Voyager and Dodge Caravan. The S minivans debuted the minivan design features of front-wheel drive, a flat floor and a sliding door for rear passengers.

The term minivan came into use largely compared to size to full-size vans; at six feet tall or lower, 1980s minivans were intended to fit inside a typical garage door opening. In 1984, The New York Times described minivans "the hot cars coming out of Detroit," noting that "analysts say the mini-van has created an entirely new market, one that may well overshadow the... station wagon."

In response to the popularity of the Voyager/Caravan, General Motors released the 1985 Chevrolet Astro and GMC Safari badge-engineered twins, and Ford released the 1986 Ford Aerostar. These vehicles used a traditional rear-wheel drive layout, unlike the Voyager/Caravan.

To match the launch of minivans by American manufacturers, Japanese manufacturers introduced the Toyota Van, Nissan Vanette, and Mitsubishi Delica to North America in 1984, 1986, and 1987, respectively. These vehicles were marketed with the generic "Van" and "Wagon" names (for cargo and passenger vans, respectively).

In 1989, the Mazda MPV was released as the first Japanese-brand minivan developed from the ground up specifically for the North American market. Its larger chassis allowed an optional V6 engine and four-wheel drive to fit. In contrast to the sliding doors of American minivans, a hinged passenger-side door was used. A driver-side entry was added for 1996, as Mazda gradually remarketed the model line as an early crossover SUV.

By the end of the 1980s, demand for minivans as family vehicles had largely superseded full-size station wagons in the United States.

==== 1990s ====
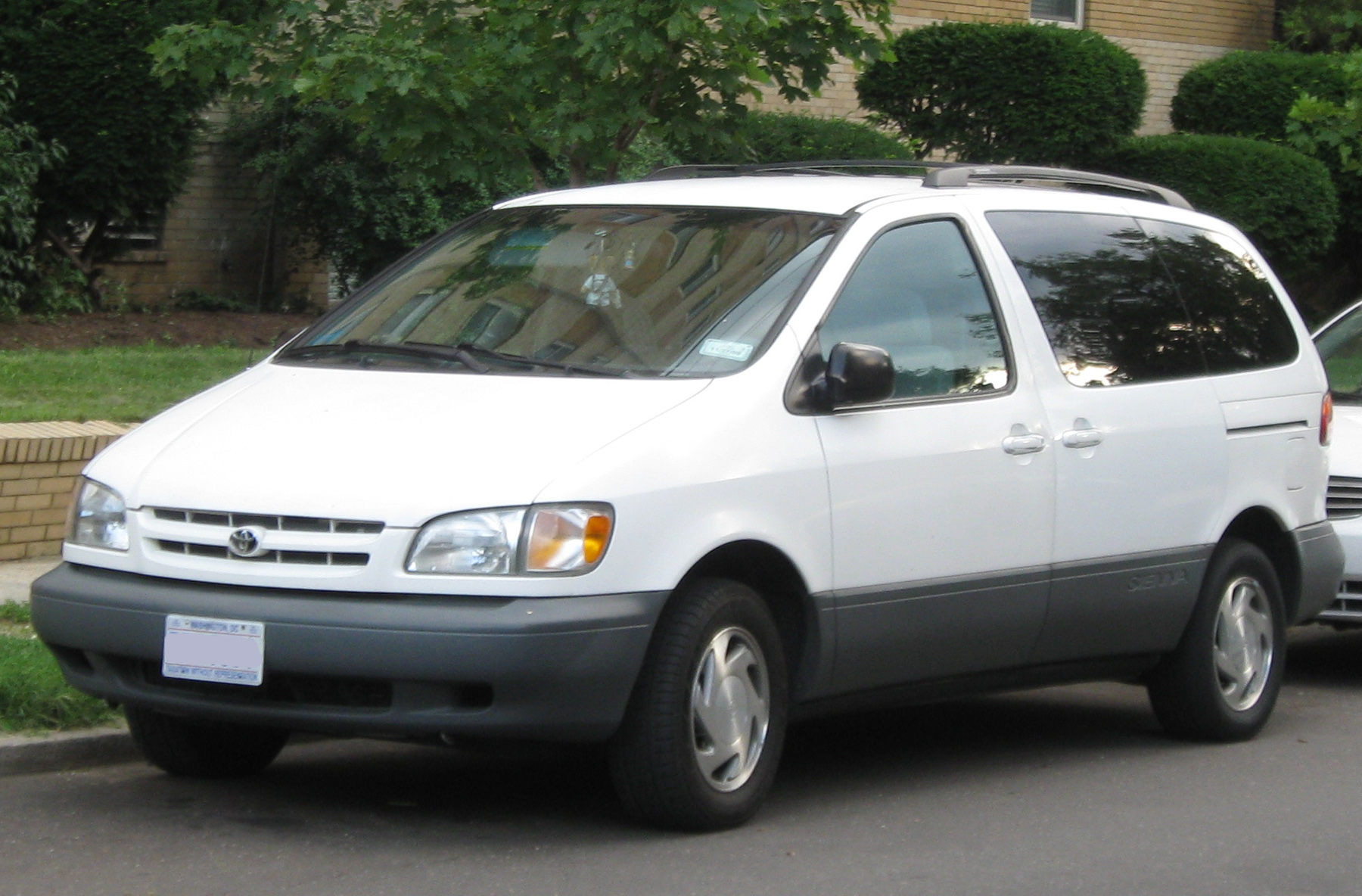
1998–2000 Toyota Sienna

During the 1990s, the minivan segment underwent several significant changes. Many models switched to the front-wheel drive layout used by the Voyager/Caravan minivans. For example, Ford replaced the Aerostar with the front-wheel drive Mercury Villager for 1993 and the Ford Windstar for 1995. The models also increased in size due to the extended-wheelbase ("Grand") versions of the Voyager and Caravan, launched in 1987. An increase in luxury features and interior equipment was seen in the Eddie Bauer version of the 1988 Ford Aerostar, the 1990 Chrysler Town & Country, and the 1990 Oldsmobile Silhouette. The third-generation Plymouth Voyager, Dodge Caravan, and Chrysler Town & Country – released for the 1996 model year – had an additional sliding door on the driver's side.

Following the 1990 discontinuation of the Nissan Vanette in the United States, Nissan also ended the sale of the second-generation Nissan Axxess. Nissan reentered the segment by forming a joint venture with Ford to develop and assemble a minivan that became the Nissan Quest and its Mercury Villager counterpart.

Toyota also introduced the Toyota Previa in 1990 to replace the Van/Wagon in North America. It was designed solely as a passenger vehicle sized to compete with American-market minivans. For 1998, the Toyota Sienna became the first Japanese-brand minivan assembled in North America, replacing the Toyota Previa in that market. For 1999, Honda introduced a separate version of the Odyssey for North America, with North America receiving a larger vehicle with sliding doors. These Japanese minivans targeted a higher price bracket as they were considerably larger and had better handling/horsepower over their domestic counterparts (i.e. Dodge Caravan).

The highest selling year for minivans was in 2000, when 1.4 million units were sold. At that time, domestic minivans were produced in large volumes and often sold for cheaper than midsize cars, however Japanese minivans were more expensive than either.

==== 2000s and 2010s ====
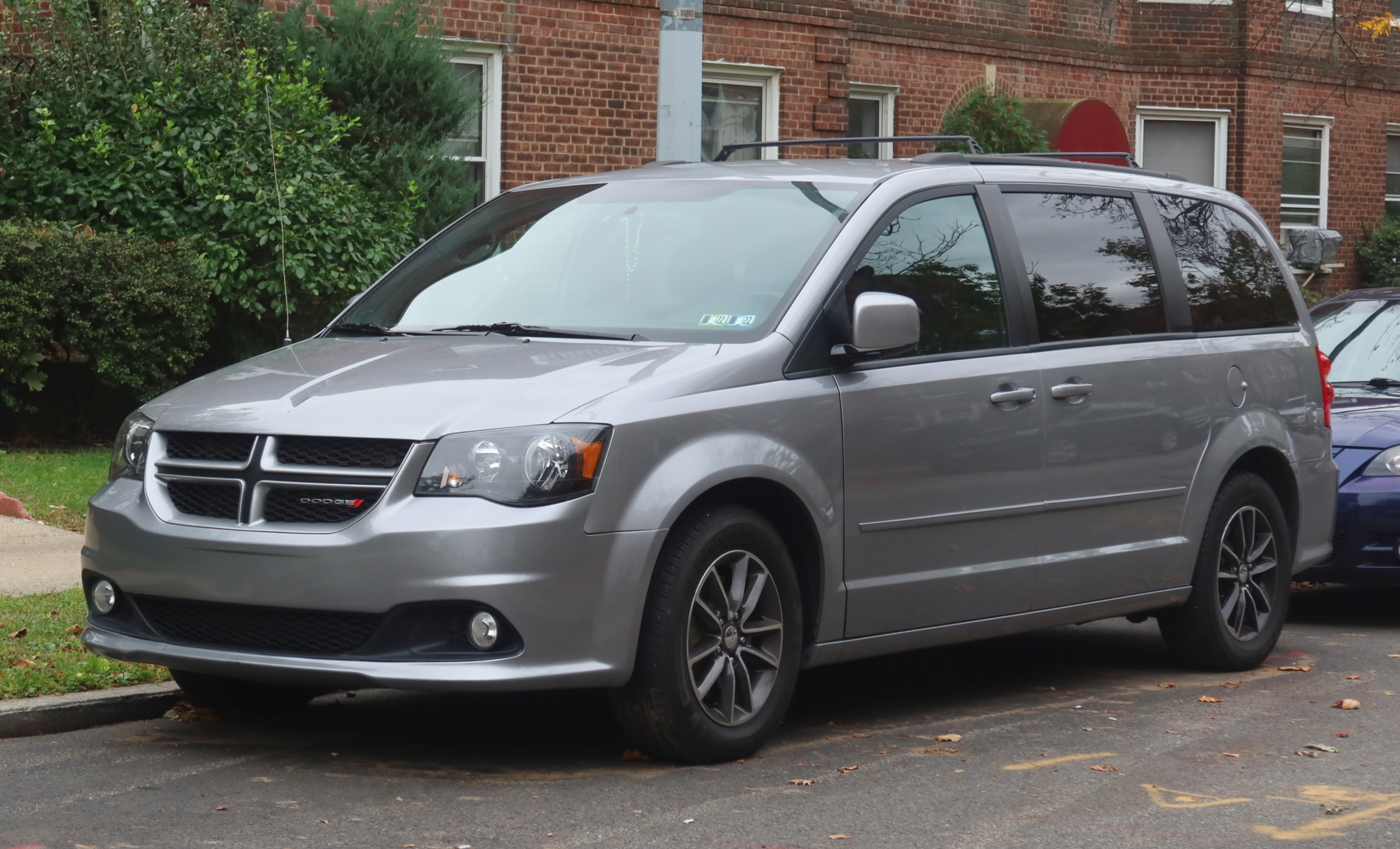
2017 Dodge Grand Caravan

In the 2000s, sales of minivans began to decrease. In 2013, the segment's sales reached approximately 500,000, one-third of its 2000 peak. Market share of minivans in 2019 reached around 2% after a steady decline from 2004, when the segment recorded above 6% of share. It has been suggested that the falling popularity of minivans is due to the increasing popularity of SUVs and crossovers, as well as the minivan's increasingly undesirable image as a vehicle for older drivers or the soccer mom demographics. Manufacturers have responded by marketing minivans as premium vehicles as well as lowering production volumes, resulting in a long waiting list for minivans such as the Toyota Sienna.

Despite the increasing popularity of three-row crossover SUVs, they have not completely replaced minivans in form or function. The Chrysler Pacifica crossover SUV (the nameplate which was later reused for a minivan in 2017) which was released in 2004 had less passenger room with its third-row seats being considered too small, compared to that of the Chrysler Town & Country minivan which was also less expensive and more fuel-efficient. Even twenty years later while crossover SUVs had improved, minivans still hold such advantages; compared to the similar-sized Toyota Grand Highlander crossover SUV which is considerably more expensive when comparably equipped, the Toyota Sienna minivan has easier loading thanks to sliding doors and lower ground clearance, more cargo space behind the 3rd row, and better comfort for the 3rd-row passengers.

From 2000 onward, several minivan manufacturers adopted boxier square-based exterior designs. Compared to the 1990s, minivans have also been positioned as more upmarket vehicles with available advanced equipment, including power doors and liftgate; seating that folded flat into the cabin floor, rear-view camera; parking sensors; DVD/VCR entertainment systems; and in-dash navigation (entertainment and navigation only offered on higher-end trims). However, the Quest and Sedona only echo these design changes in their third and second respective generations. At the same time, Chrysler introduced fold-flat seating in 2005 (under the trademark “Stow-n’-go”). Mazda's MPV did not feature power doors and was discontinued in 2017.

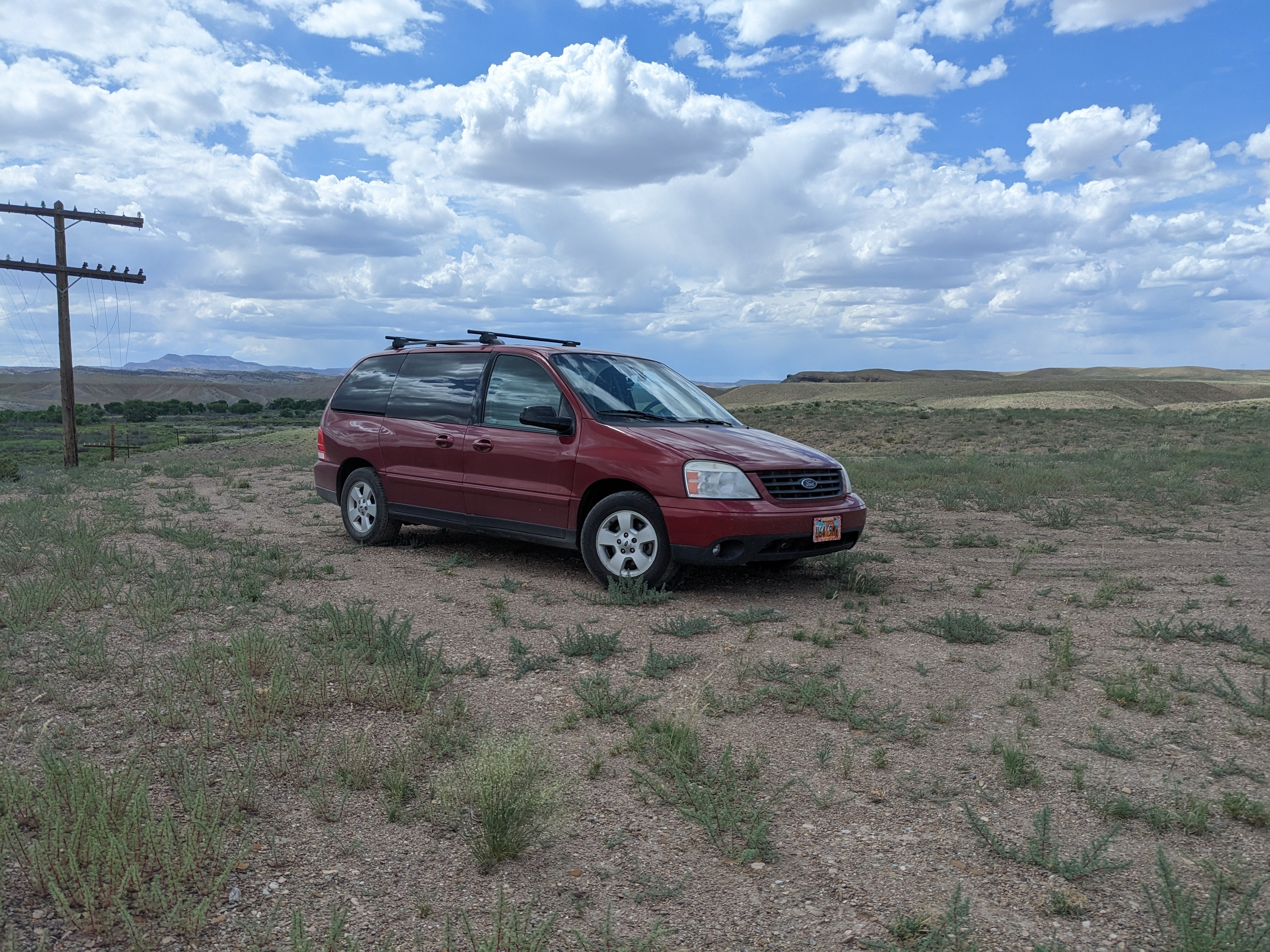
2004 Ford Freestar

Due to the market decline, North American sales of the Volkswagen Eurovan ceased in 2003. Ford exited the segment in 2006 when the Ford Freestar was canceled, Chrysler discontinued its short-wheelbase minivans in 2007, and General Motors left the market segment in 2009 with the cancellation of the Chevrolet Uplander. However, Volkswagen marketed the Volkswagen Routan (a rebadged Chrysler RT minivans) between 2009 and 2013. In 2010, Ford started importing the commercial-oriented Ford Transit Connect Wagon from Turkey. A similar vehicle, the Mercedes-Benz Metris, entered the North American market in 2016.

The Kia Sedona, which was introduced for the 2002 model year, is notable for being the first minivan from a South Korean manufacturer in the region. For 2007, Kia also introduced the three-row Kia Rondo compact MPV, where it was prominently marketed as a crossover due to its small size and the use of hinged rear doors.

Another compact MPV released to the market was the Mazda5 in 2004, a three-row vehicle with rear sliding doors. Mazda claimed the model "does not fit into any traditional (North American) segmentation." The Ford C-Max was released for 2013 as a hybrid electric and battery electric compact MPV with sliding doors. However, it did not offer third-row seating in North America.

During the 2020s, however, minivans have been reported to be resurging in popularity. Commonly cited reasons for said resurgence include larger amounts of cargo space in comparison to SUVs; lighter weight; and more optimal fuel efficiency, due to many models having recently adopted hybrid, PHEV and electric powertrains.

== Europe ==
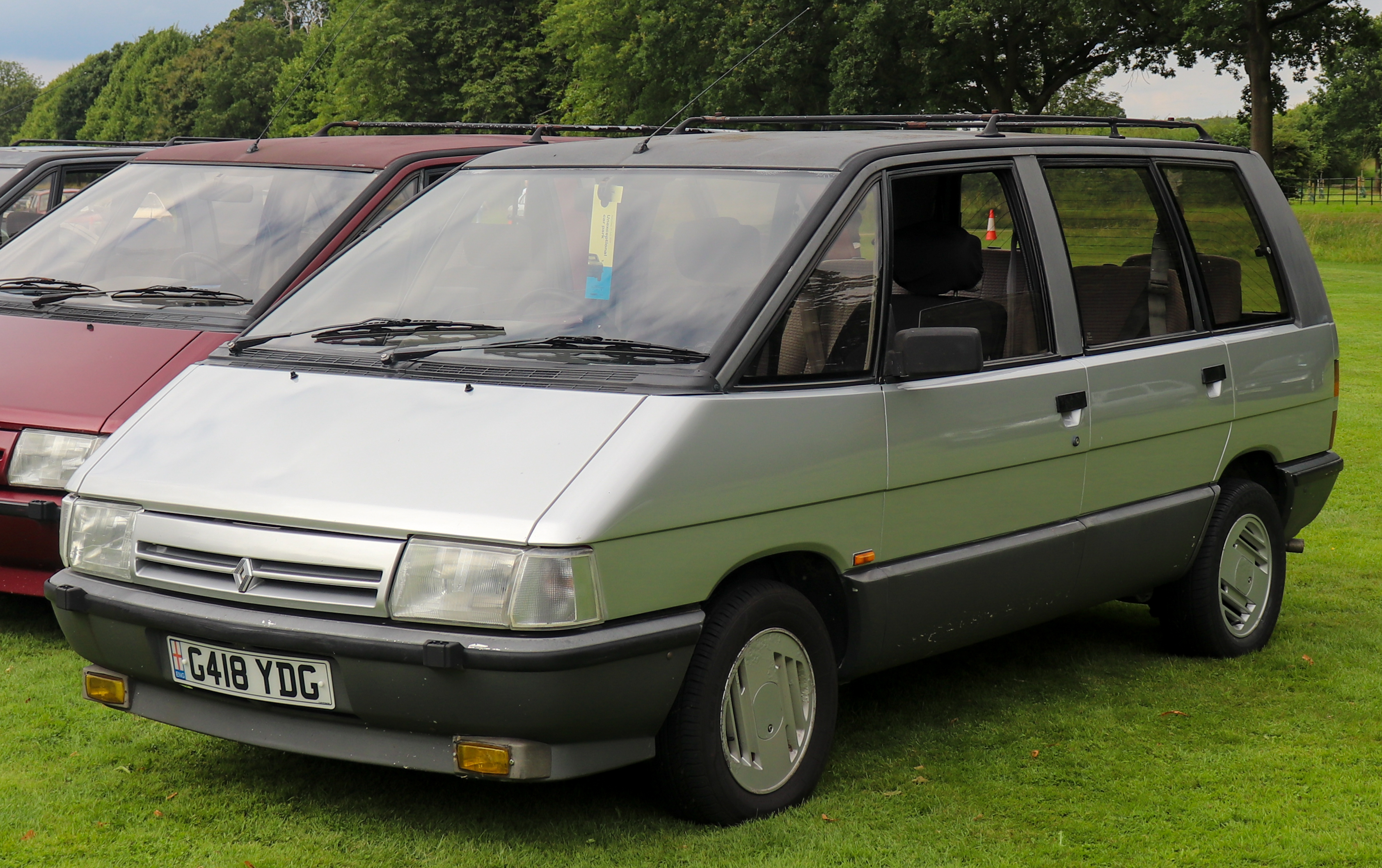
1989 Renault Espace

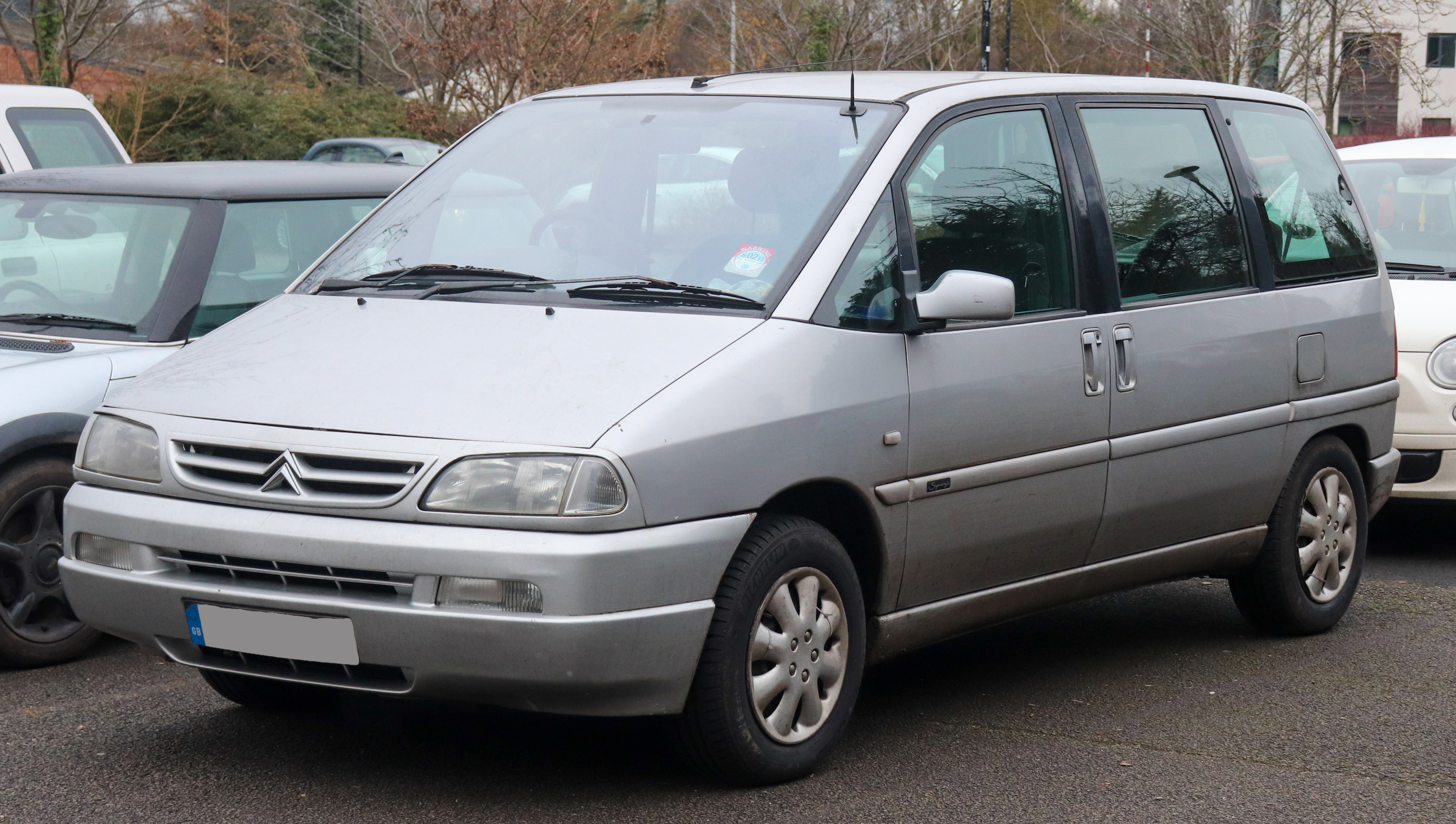
2001 Citroën Evasion/Synergie

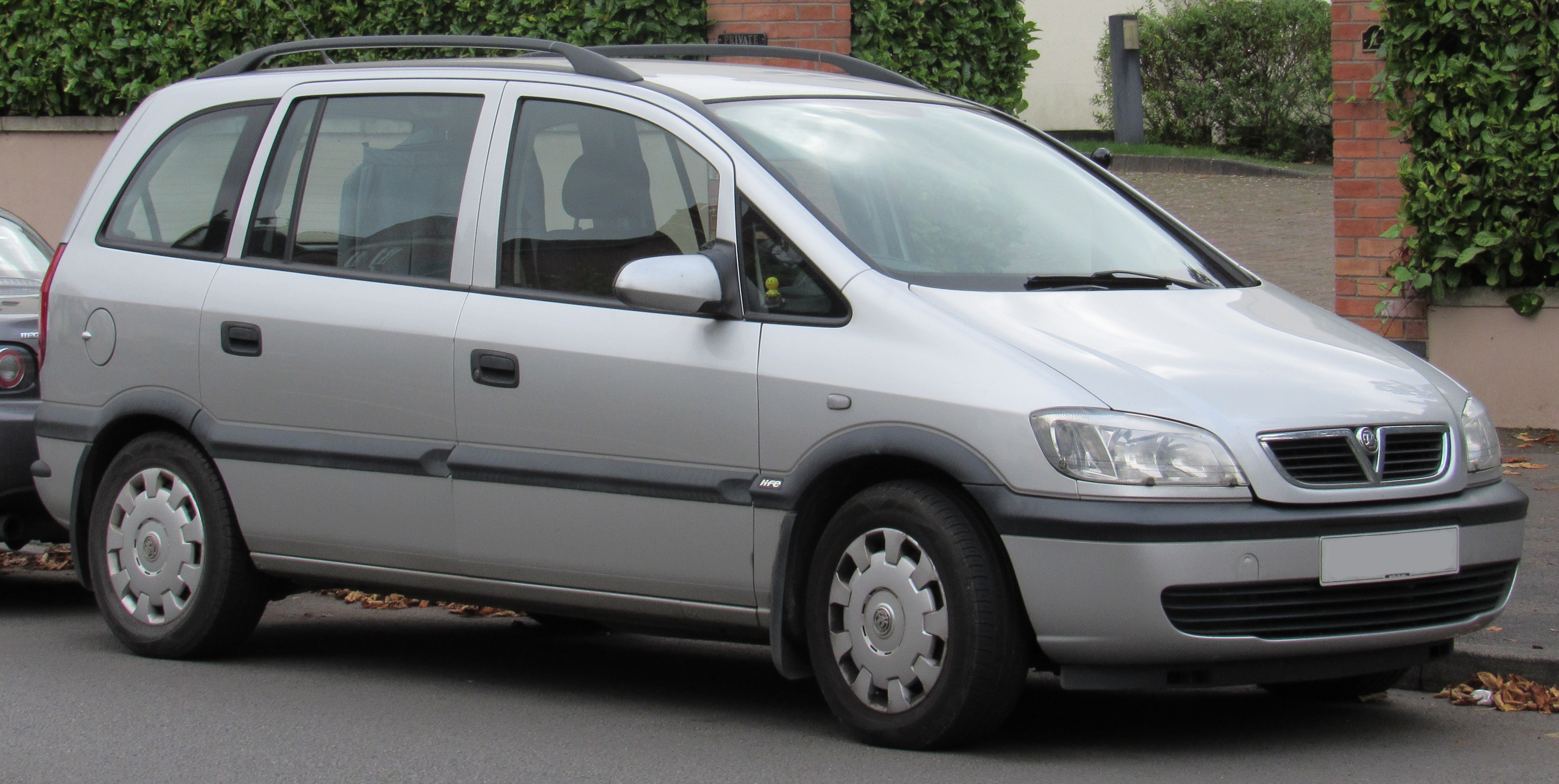
2004 Vauxhall Zafira A

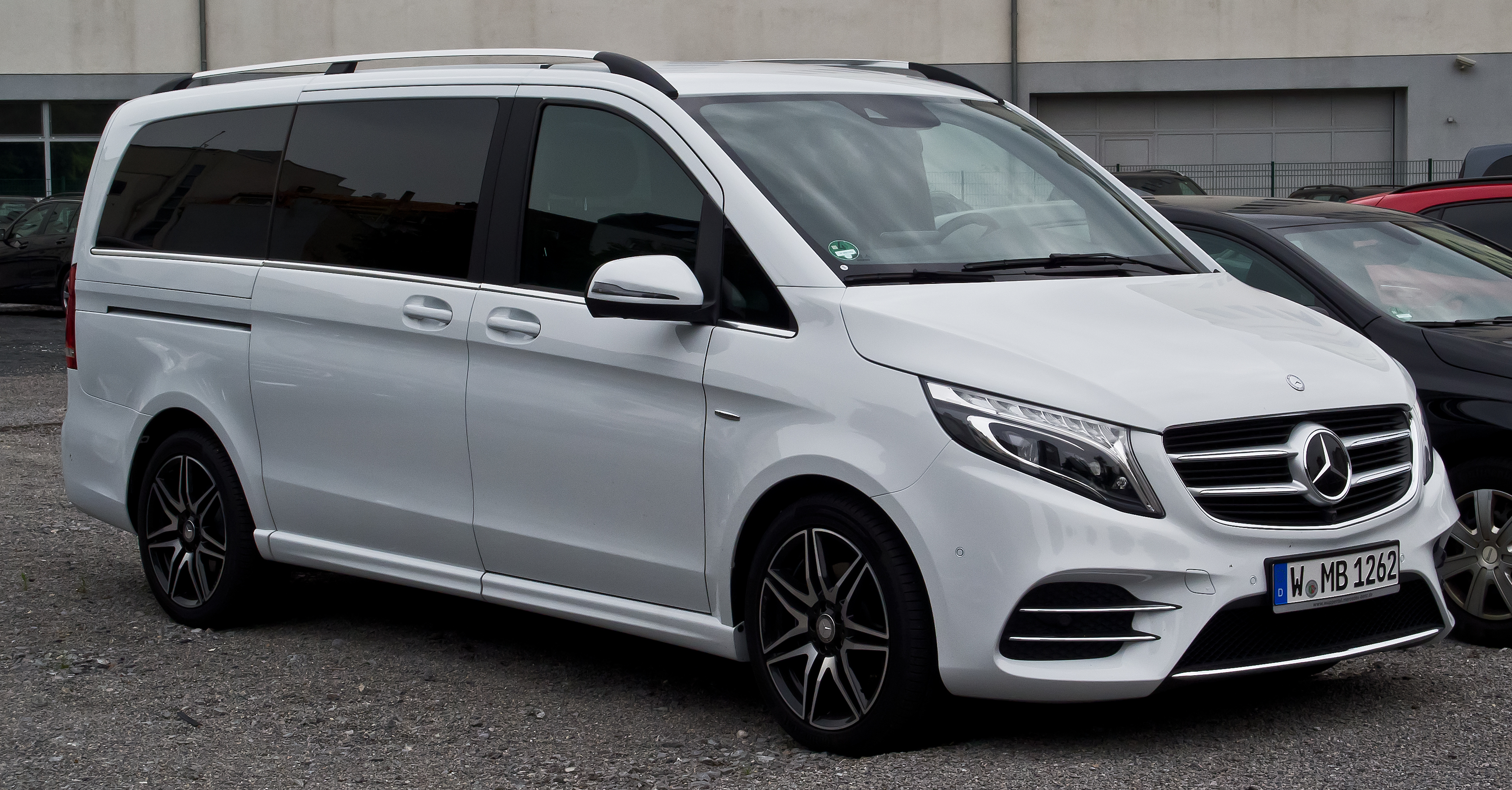
2016 Mercedes-Benz Metris

In Europe, the classification is commonly known as "MPV", "people carrier", or officially M-segment, and includes van-based vehicles and smaller vehicles with two-row seating.

=== History ===
==== 1980s ====
The 1984 Renault Espace was the first European-developed minivan developed primarily for passenger use (as the earlier DKW and Volkswagen used their commercial van platforms in a minibus variant). Beginning development in the 1970s under the European subsidiaries of Chrysler, the Espace was intended as a successor for the Matra Rancho, leading to its use of front-hinged doors. While slow-selling at the time of its release, the Espace would become the most successful European-brand minivan.

Initially intending to market the Espace in North America through American Motors Corporation (AMC), the 1987 sale of AMC to Chrysler canceled the plans for Renault to do so. In the late 1980s, Chrysler and Ford commenced sales of American-designed minivans in Europe (categorized as full-size in the region), selling the Chrysler Voyager and Ford Aerostar. General Motors imported the Oldsmobile Silhouette (branded as the Pontiac Trans Sport), later marketing the American-produced Opel/Vauxhall Sintra.

==== 1990s ====
In the 1990s, several joint ventures produced long-running minivan designs. In 1994, badge engineered series of Eurovans was introduced, produced by Sevel Nord and marketed by Citroën, Fiat, Lancia, and Peugeot. The Eurovans were built with two sliding doors; the gearshift was located on the dashboard to increase interior space, and a petal-type handbrake was adopted. In 1995, Ford of Europe and Volkswagen entered a joint venture, producing the Ford Galaxy, SEAT Alhambra, and Volkswagen Sharan minivans, featuring front-hinged rear side doors.

In 1996, Mercedes introduced the Mercedes-Benz V-Class as a standard panel van for cargo (called Vito) or with passenger accommodations substituted for part or all of the load area (called V-Class or Viano). In 1998, the Fiat Multipla was released. A two-row, six-seater MPV with a 3+3 seat configuration borrowing its name from an older minivan, it is notable for its highly controversial design.

Market reaction to these new full-size MPV models was mixed. Consumers perceived MPVs as large and truck-like despite boasting similar footprints as large sedans. Arguably, cultural reasons regarding vehicle size and high fuel prices were a factor. During 1996 and 1997, the Western European MPV market expanded from around 210,000 units to 350,000 units annually. However, the growth did not continue as expected, resulting in serious plant overcapacity.

Renault set a new "compact MPV" standard with the Renault Scénic in 1996, which became popular. Based on the C-segment Mégane platform, it offered the same multi-use and flexibility aspects as the larger MPVs but with a much smaller footprint.

==== 2000s ====
After the success of the Renault Scénic, other makers have developed similar European-focused products, such as the Opel Zafira that offered three-row seating, Citroën Xsara Picasso and others.

== Asia ==
=== Japan ===
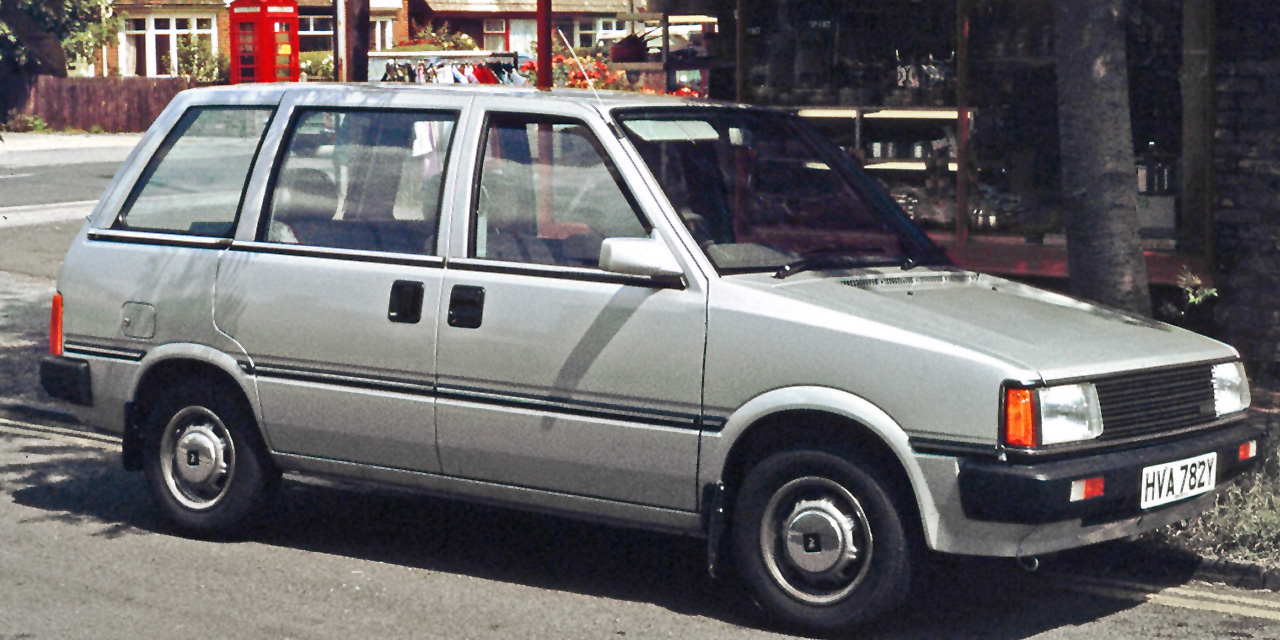
1982 Nissan Prairie

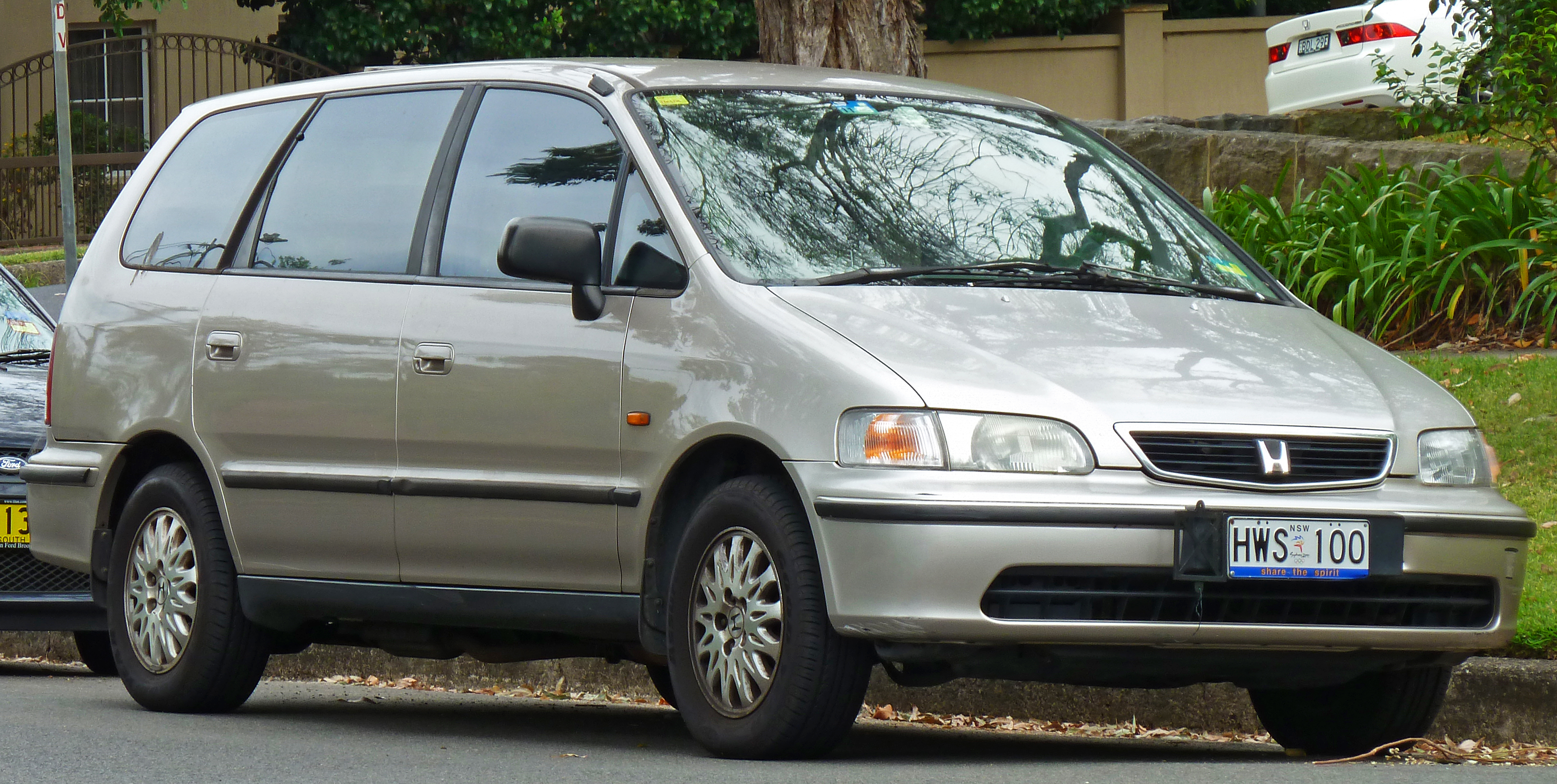
2000 Honda Odyssey

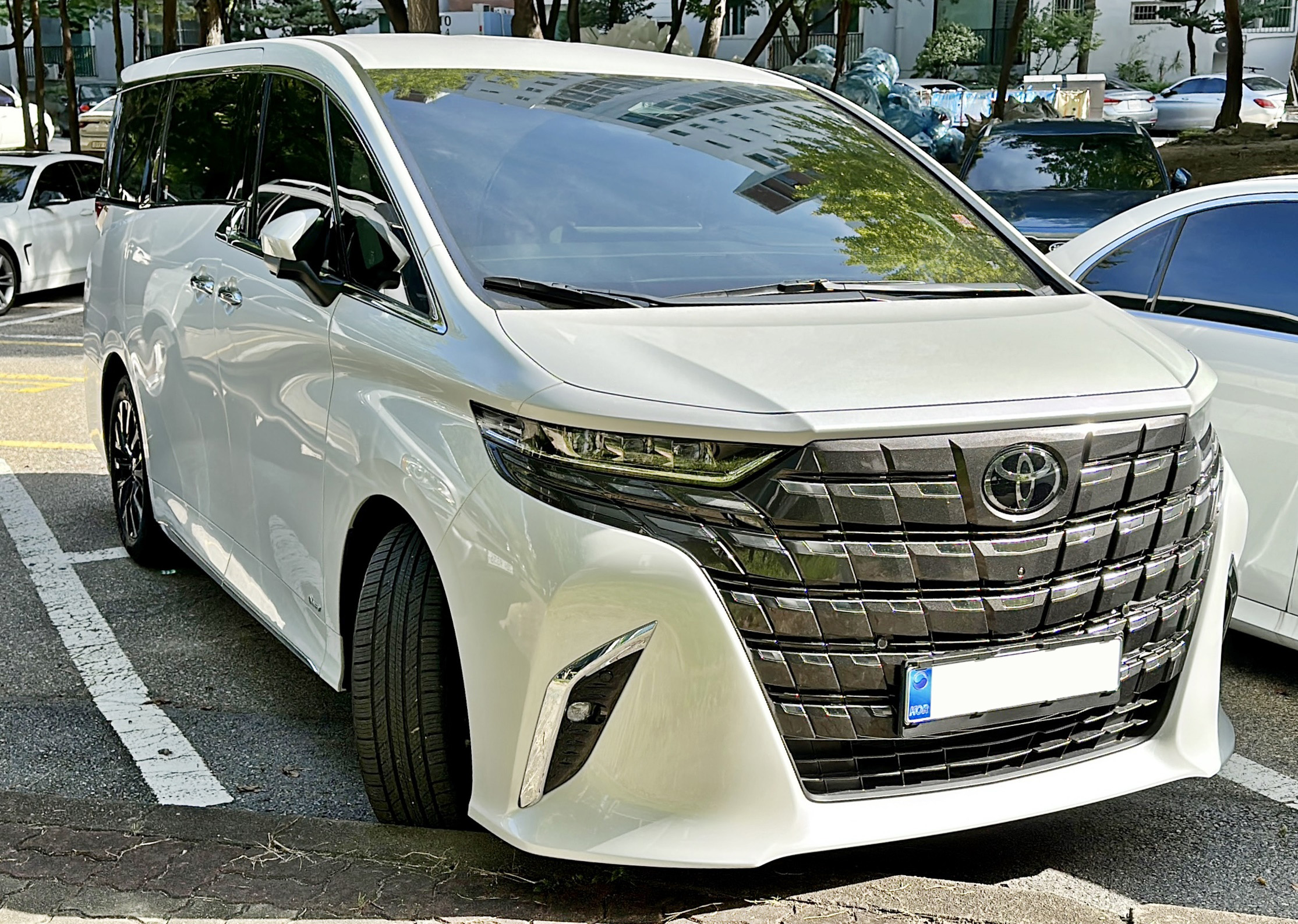
2023 Toyota Alphard

In Japan, the classification is known as "minivan" (Japanese: ミニバン, Hepburn: Miniban) and defined by its three-row seating capacity.

Before the birth of minivans with modern form factors, tall wagon-type vehicles with large seating capacity in Japan were known as light vans. They commonly adopted mid-engine, cab over design, and rear-wheel drive layout with one-box form factor. Examples included the Toyota TownAce, Nissan Vanette, Mitsubishi Delica, and Mazda Bongo. These vehicles were based on commercial vehicles, which created a gap compared to sedans regarding ride quality and luxury.

The Nissan Prairie, released in 1982, is considered the first Japanese compact minivan. Derived closely from a compact sedan, the Prairie was marketed as a "boxy sedan", configured with sliding doors, folding rear seats, and a lifting rear hatch. The Mitsubishi Chariot adopted nearly the same form factor, instead using wagon-style front-hinged doors.

In 1990, Toyota introduced the Toyota Estima in Japan, which carried over the mid-engine configuration of the TownAce. Along with its highly rounded exterior, the Estima was distinguished by its nearly panoramic window glass. The Estima was redesigned in 2000, adopting a front-wheel drive layout and offered with a hybrid powertrain since 2001. In 2002, Toyota introduced the Toyota Alphard which was developed as a luxury-oriented model. In 2020, Lexus introduced their first luxury minivan, the Lexus LM, produced with varying degrees of relation with the Toyota Alphard/Vellfire. The LM designation stands for "Luxury Mover".

Nissan introduced the Nissan Serena in 1991 and the Nissan Elgrand in 1997.

In 1995, Honda entered the minivan segment by introducing the Honda Odyssey. The Odyssey was designed with front-hinged doors and as derived from the Honda Accord. It came with advantages such as sedan-like driving dynamics and a lower floor to allow for easy access. A design feature that would become adopted by other manufacturers, the Odyssey introduced a rear seat that folded flat into the floor (replacing a removable rear seat). The Odyssey evolved into a low-roof, estate-like minivan until 2013, when it adopted a high-roof body with rear sliding doors. Honda also produced the Honda Stepwgn mid-size MPV since 1996, which is designed with a higher cabin and narrow width, and the Honda Stream since 2000 to slot below the Odyssey.

In 2020, minivans made up 20.8% of total automobile sales in Japan, behind SUVs and compact hatchbacks, making it one of the largest minivan markets in the world.

=== South Korea ===
In South Korea, both the terms "minivan" and "MPV" are used. The Kia Carnival (also sold the Kia Sedona) was introduced in 1998 with dual sliding doors. Sharing its configuration with the Honda Odyssey, the Hyundai Trajet was sold from 1999 to 2008. Introduced in 2004, the SsangYong Rodius is the highest-capacity minivan, seating up to 11 passengers. It was discontinued in 2019.

Current minivans marketed in South Korea are the Kia Carnival and Hyundai Staria, along with imported options such as the Toyota Sienna (originally for North America) and later generations of Honda Odyssey.

=== China ===
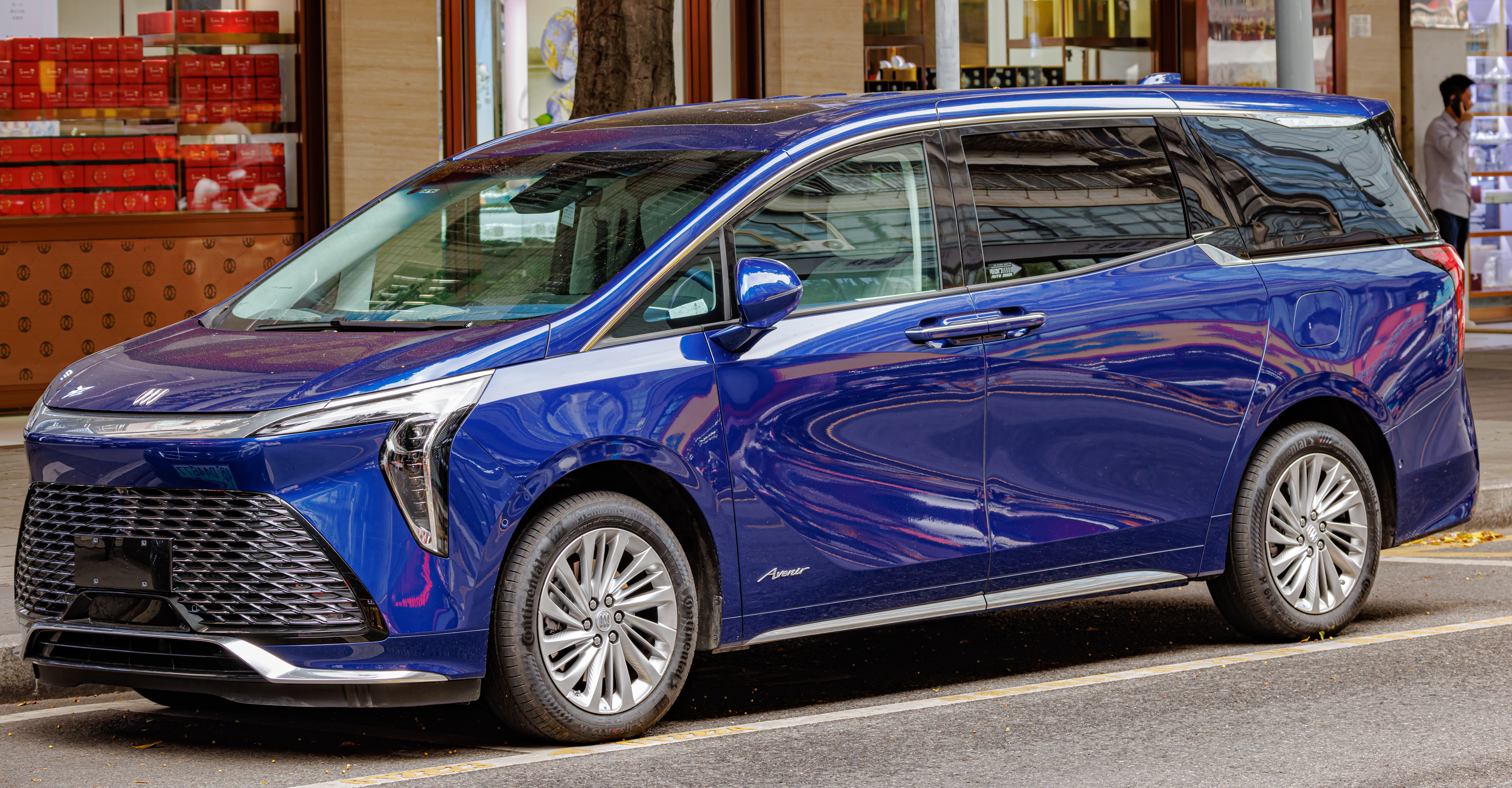
Buick GL8 Century

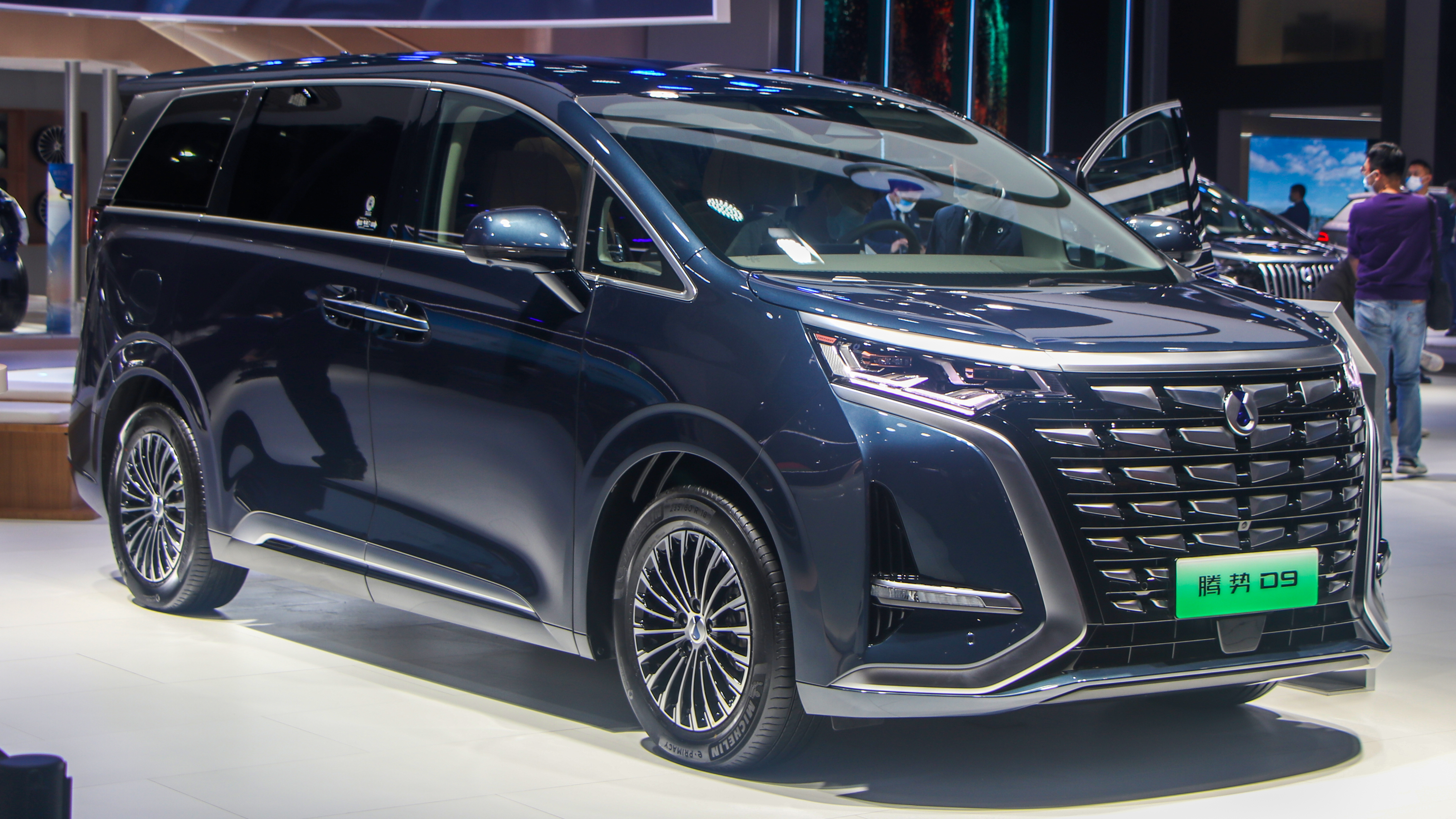
Denza D9

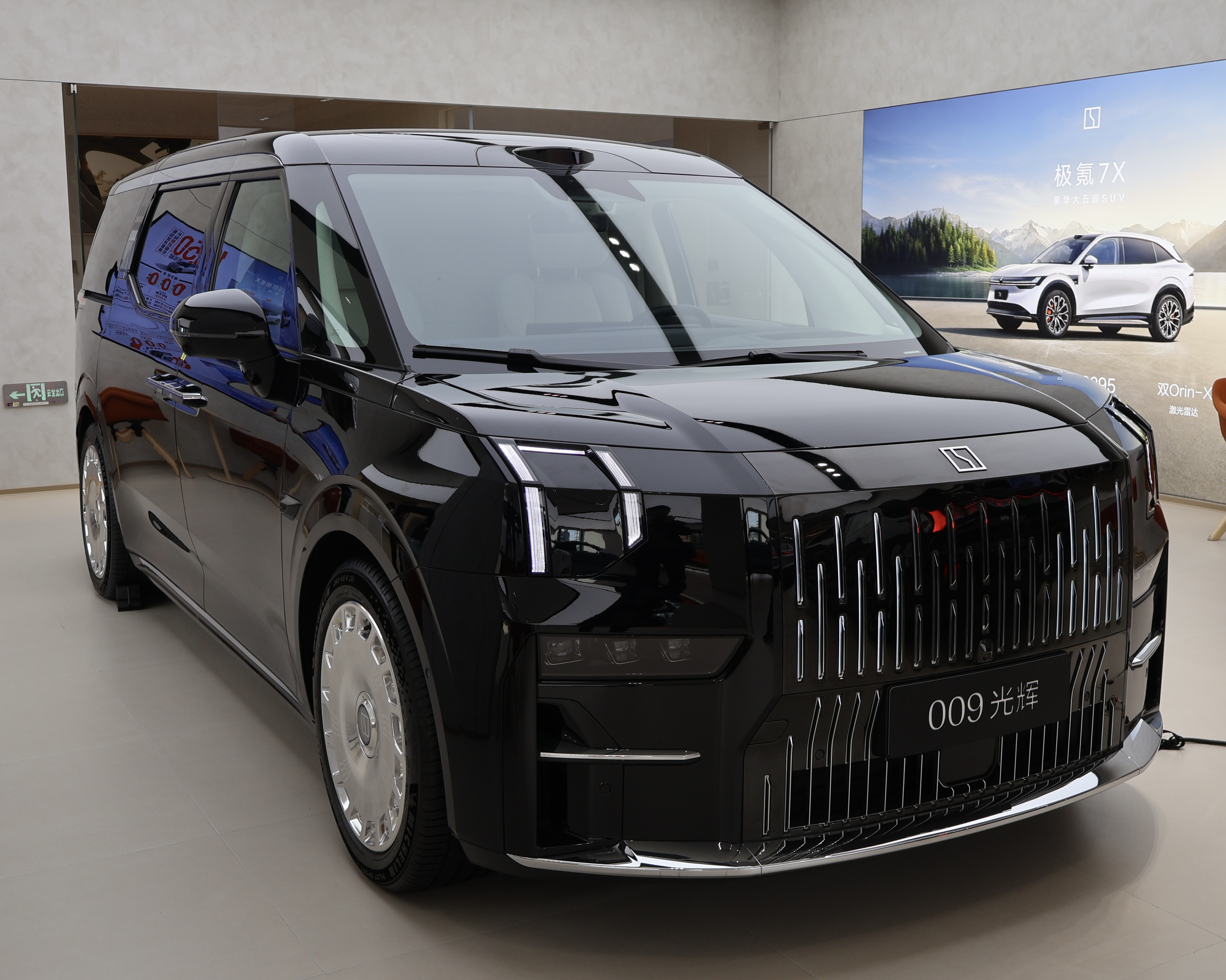
Zeekr 009

In 1999, Shanghai GM commenced production of the Buick GL8 MPV, derived from a MPV platform designed by GM in the United States. After two generations of production, the GL8 is the final minivan produced by General Motors or its joint ventures today. It remained dominant in the high-end minivan segment of the market.

Sales of MPVs in China increased rapidly in 2015 and 2016 when the Chinese government lifted the one-child policy in favor of the two-child policy, which pushed customer preference toward three-row vehicles in anticipation of a larger family. In 2016, 2,497,543 minivans were sold in China, a major increase from 2012, which recorded 936,232 sales. However, sales volume has shrunk ever since, with only 1,082,028 MPVs sold in the domestic market in 2021 (4.1% of the total car market), around 720,000 of which were sold by domestic manufacturers.

The Denza D9 introduced on 16 May 2022 in China, Sales for the Chinese market were commenced on 23 August 2022, with the first units rolling out on 21 October 2022, while deliveries began on 25 October 2022. It made its global debut in Thailand in March 2023 at the 44th Bangkok International Motor Show.

In August 2022, Zeekr introduced the Zeekr 009 electric MPV, deliveries of the 009 began in the first quarter of 2023 in China. 912hp, 6C battery and 0-100km/h of 3.9 seconds.

On November 17, 2023, XPENG officially showcased the XPeng X9, it sits on the SEPA 2.0 platform with three rows and 7 seats in a setup of 2–2–3. The drag coefficient is 0.227 C_{d}. The XPeng X9 battery options include an 84.5 kWh lithium iron phosphate (LFP) battery pack supplied by Eve Energy and a 101.5 kWh ternary NMC battery pack from CALB. The XPeng X9's SEPA 2.0 platform supports 800V charging enabling adding 300 km (186 mi) of range within 10 minutes of charging time.

The Li Mega introduced in November 2023 at the Auto Guangzhou, where pre-orders were accepted. The minivan is notable for its distinctive exterior design, which contributes in aerodynamics with a wind resistance drag coefficient of just 0.215 Cd, the lowest among MPVs globally currently in production.

=== Indonesia ===
The MPV segment is the most popular passenger car segment in Indonesia, with a market share of 40% in 2021.

=== India ===
The category is commonly known as multi utility vehicle (MUV) or MPV. In fiscal year 2020, the sales volume of the segment totaled 283,583 vehicles, or 10.3% of industry total.

== Luxury MPV ==
Several manufacturers produce upscale MPVs positioned as luxury cars, primarily marketed in select Asian markets. They generally have three rows for six- or seven-seats; however, range-topping flagship models may also offer a two-row option with first class travel four seats, which typically offered more features and higher-priced counterparts.

Examples of luxury MPV models include Mercedes-Benz VLE, Lexus LM, Hongqi HQ9, Volvo EM90, Buick GL8, Denza D9, Wey Gaoshan, Li Mega, Luxeed V9, Maextro V800, Voyah Dream, Toyota Alphard, Nissan Elgrand and the Zeekr 009.

Examples of luxury MPVs

Mercedes-Benz VLE
(2026–present)

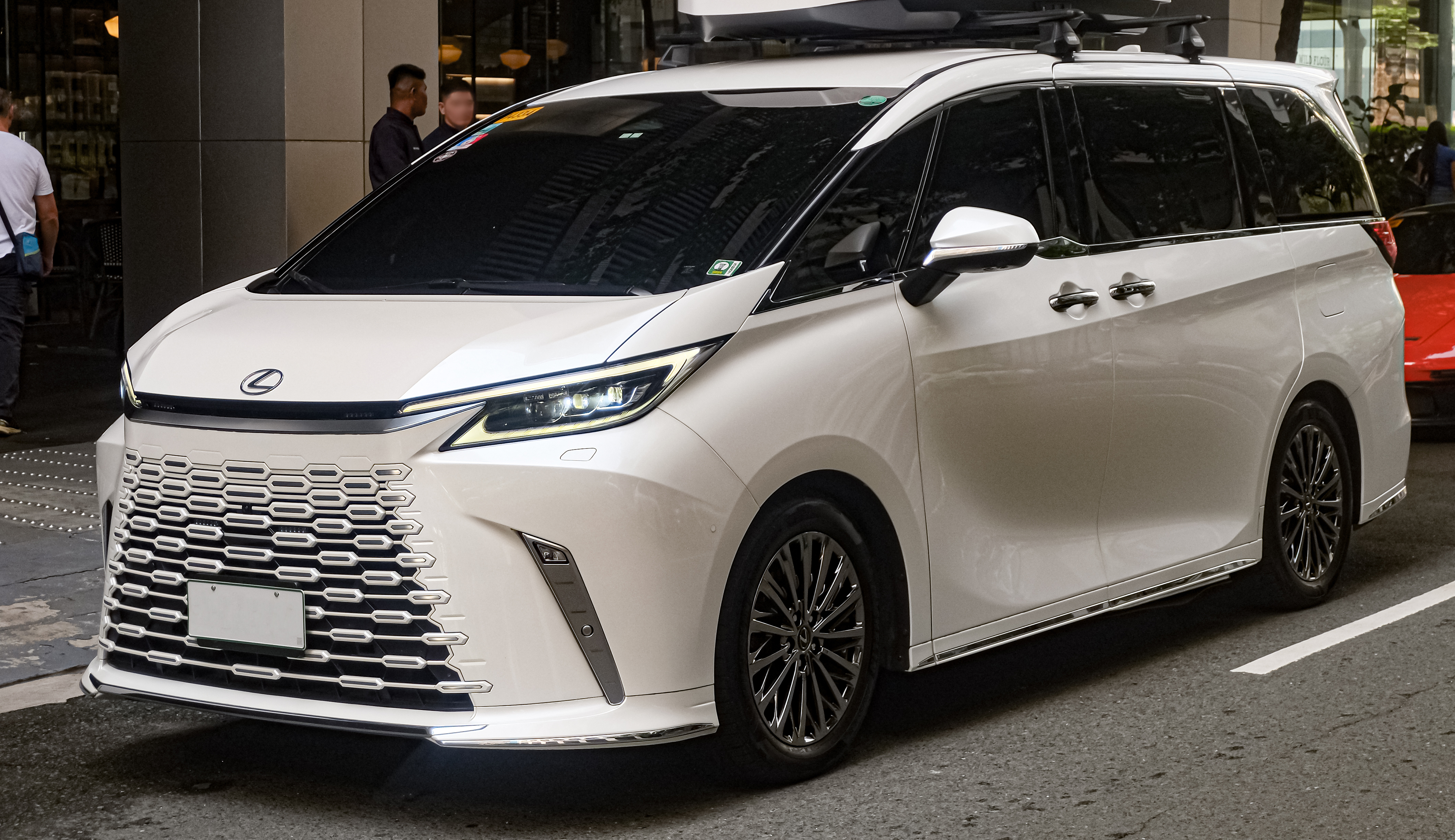
Lexus LM
(2020–present)

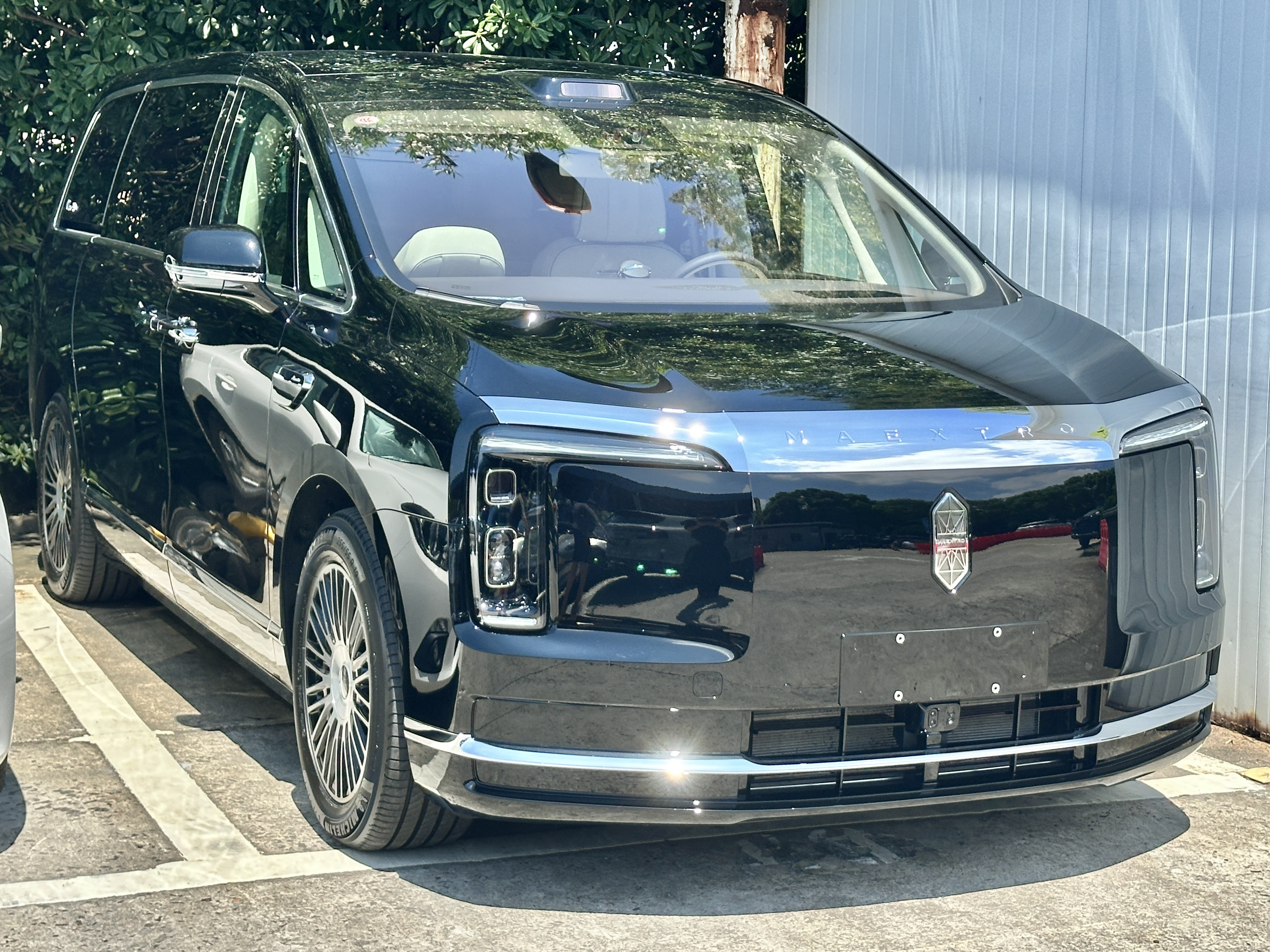
Maextro V800
(2026–present)

Volvo EM90
(2023–present)

== Size categories ==
=== Mini MPV ===
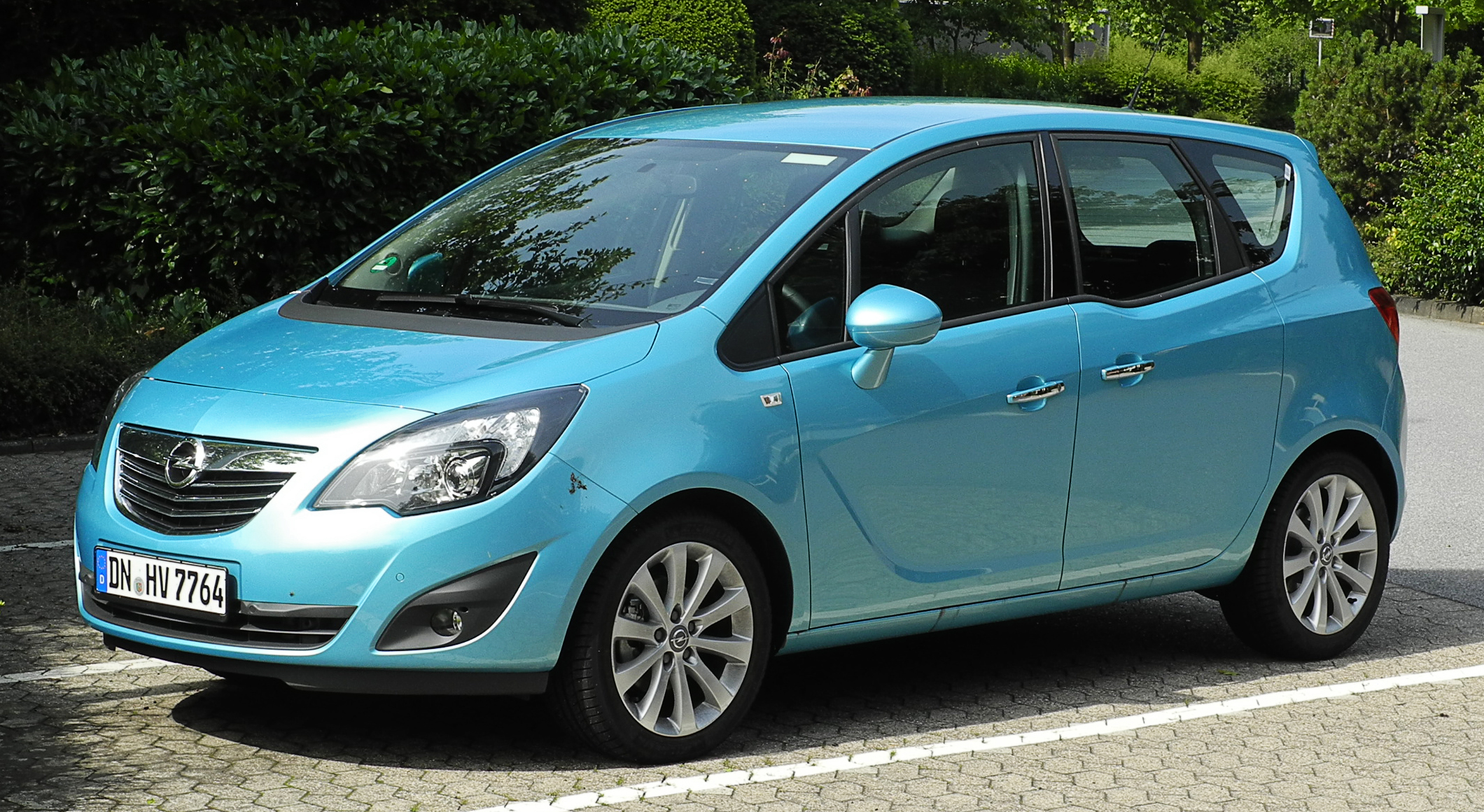
Opel Meriva (2003–2017)

Mini MPV – an abbreviation for Mini Multi-Purpose Vehicle – is a vehicle size class for the smallest size of minivans (MPVs). The Mini MPV size class sits below the compact MPV size class, and the vehicles are often built on the platforms of B-segment hatchback models.

Several minivans based on B-segment platforms have been marketed as 'leisure activity vehicles' in Europe. These include the Fiat Fiorino and Ford Transit Courier.

Examples: Category:Mini MPVs ( 76 )

=== Compact MPV ===
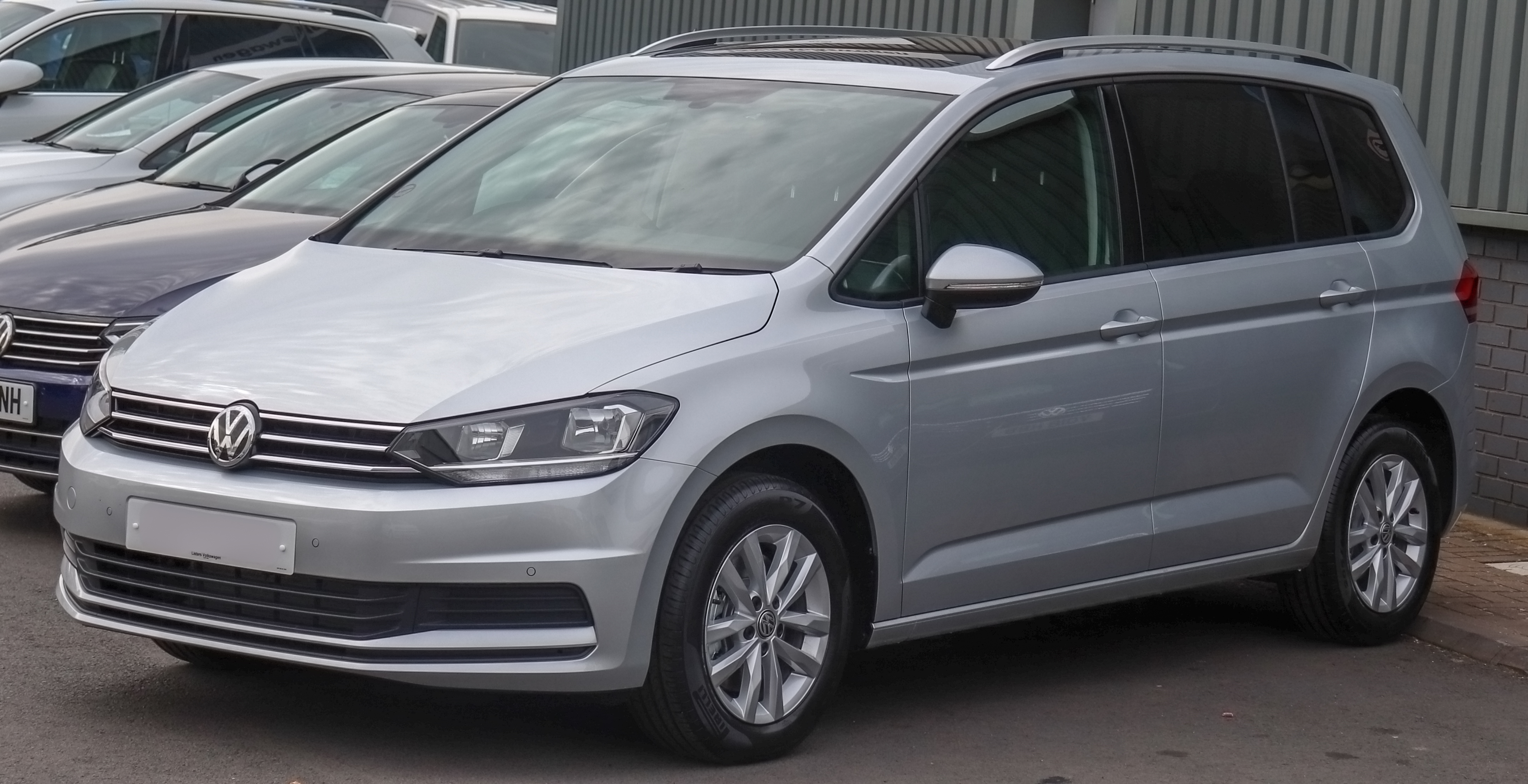
Volkswagen Touran (2015–2026)

Compact MPV – an abbreviation for Compact Multi-Purpose Vehicle – is a vehicle size class for the middle size of MPVs/minivans. The Compact MPV size class sits between the mini MPV and minivan size classes.

Compact MPVs remain predominantly European, although they are also built and sold in many Latin American and Asian markets. As of 2016, the only compact MPV sold widely in the United States was the Ford C-Max.

Examples: Category:Compact MPVs ( 107 )

== Related categories ==
=== Leisure activity vehicle ===
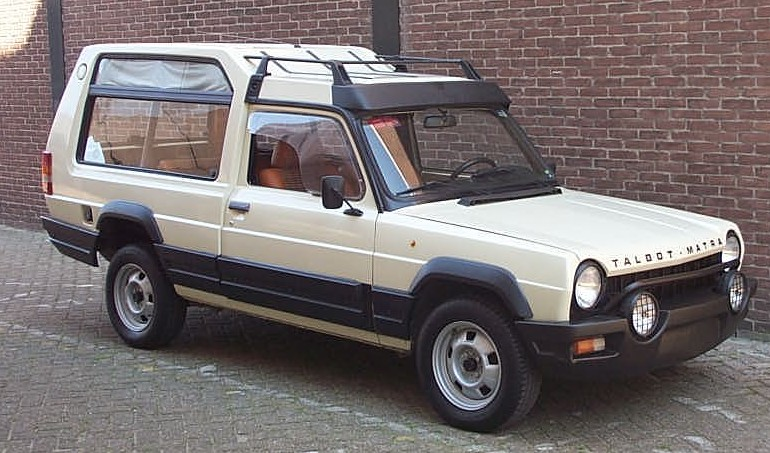
Matra Rancho, one of the first LAVs

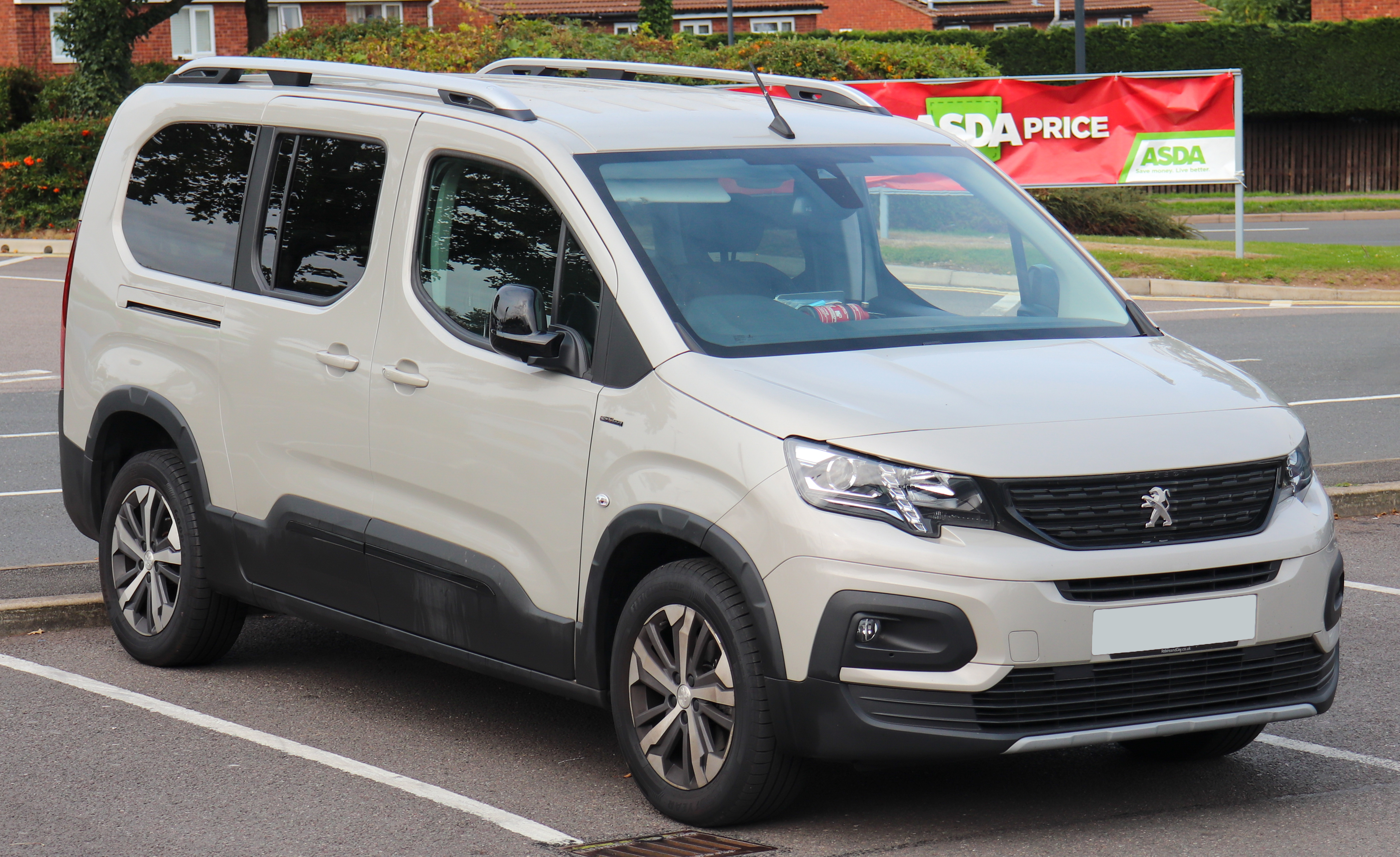
Peugeot Rifter, a LAV based on the Peugeot Partner commercial van

A leisure activity vehicle (abbreviated LAV), also known as van-based MPV and ludospace in French, is the passenger-oriented version of small commercial vans primarily marketed in Europe. One of the first LAVs was the 1977 Matra Rancho (among the first crossover SUVs and a precursor to the Renault Espace), with European manufacturers expanding the segment in the late 1990s, following the introduction of the Citroën Berlingo and Renault Kangoo.

Leisure activity vehicles are typically derived from supermini or subcompact car platforms, differing from mini MPVs in body design. To maximize interior space, LAVs feature a taller roof, more upright windshield, and longer hood/bonnet with either a liftgate or barn doors to access the boot. Marketed as an alternative to sedan-derived small family cars, LAVs have seating with a lower H-point than MPVs or minivans, offering two (or three) rows of seating.

Though sharing underpinnings with superminis, subcompacts, and mini MPVs, using an extended wheelbase can make leisure activity vehicles longer than those from which they are derived. For example, the Fiat Doblò is one of the longest LAVs with a total length of 4,255 mm (167.5 in), versus the 4,050 mm (159.4 in) of the Opel Meriva (a mini MPV) and the 4,030 mm (158.7 in) of the Peugeot 206 SW (a supermini).

=== Asian utility vehicle ===
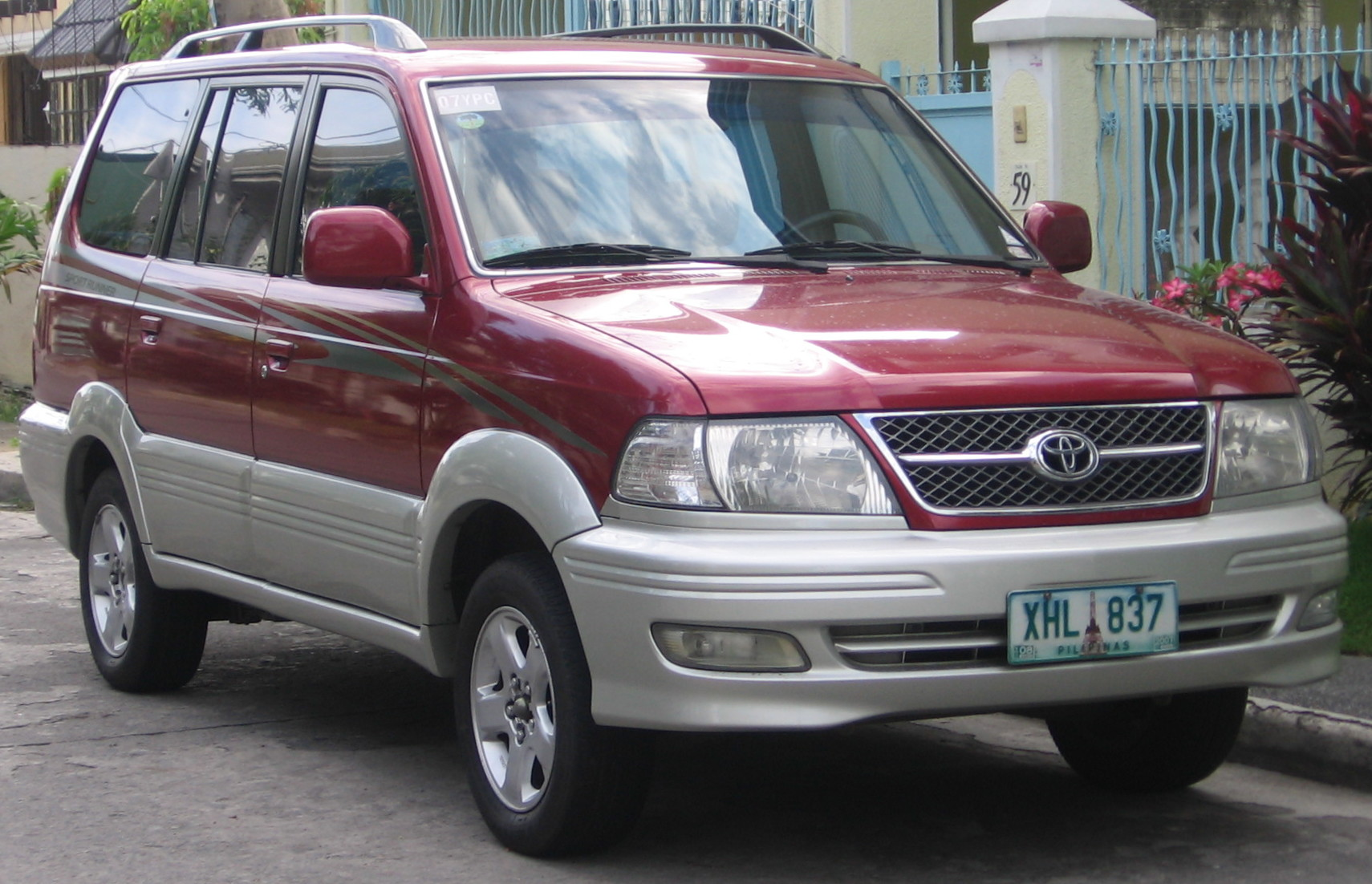
Toyota Revo, also known as the Kijang in Indonesia

An Asian utility vehicle (abbreviated AUV) originates from the Philippines to describe basic and affordable vehicles with either large seating capacity or cargo designed to be sold in developing countries. These vehicles are usually available in minivan-like wagon body style with a seating capacity of 7 to 16 passengers. They are usually based on a compact pickup truck with body-on-frame chassis and rear-wheel drive to maximize its load capacity and durability while maintaining low manufacturing costs. Until the 2000s, AUVs were popular in Southeast Asia, particularly in Indonesia, the Philippines, Taiwan, and some African markets.

The first AUV is the Toyota Tamaraw/Kijang, introduced in the Philippines and Indonesia in 1975 as a pickup truck with an optional rear cabin. In the 1990s, other vehicles such as the Isuzu Panther/Hi-Lander/Crosswind and Mitsubishi Freeca/Adventure/Kuda emerged in the AUV segment. Modern equivalent of AUV is the Toyota Innova, an MPV that is the direct successor to the Kijang which in its first two generations were built with body-on-frame construction. The vehicle's third generation switched to unibody construction.

=== Three-row SUV ===
With the decline of the minivan/MPV category in many regions, such as North America and Europe, in the mid-2010s, SUVs and crossovers with three rows of seating became popular alternatives. Compared to minivans, three-row SUVs lose sliding doors and generally offer less interior space due to the higher priorities on exterior styling and higher ground clearance.

== See also ==
- Kei car
- Microvan
