= 4 Hours of Imola =

Sports car endurance race in Italy

(Italy) 4 Hours of Imola 4 Ore di Imola (Italian)

European Le Mans Series
- Venue: Autodromo Enzo e Dino Ferrari
- First race: 1954
- First ELMS race: 2013
- Last race: 2025
- Duration: 4 hours
- Most wins (driver): Jacky Ickx (5)
- Most wins (team): JW Automotive (4); Porsche factory (4)
- Most wins (manufacturer): Ferrari (10)

The 4 Hours of Imola is an endurance race for sports cars held at Autodromo Enzo e Dino Ferrari in Imola, Italy.

== Results ==
Year	Overall winner(s)	Entrant	Car	Distance/Duration	Race title	Championship	Report
1954	(Italy) Umberto Maglioli	(Italy) Scuderia Ferrari	Ferrari 500 Mondial	250 km (160 mi)	Gran Premio dell'Autodromo di Imola	Non-championship	report
1955	(Italy) Cesare Perdisa	(Italy) Officine Alfieri Maserati	Maserati A6GCS	250 km (160 mi)	Golden Shell Race	Non-championship	report
1956	(Italy) Eugenio Castellotti	(Italy) Osca	Osca MT4 1500	250 km (160 mi)	Gran Premio Shell d'Imola	Non-championship	report
1957–1963: Not held
1964	(Italy) Franco Patria		Abarth-Simca 2000	60 km (37 mi)	Coppa Gran Turismo – Trofeo Shell	Non-championship	report
1965	(Italy) Herbert Demetz	(Italy) Abarth	Abarth-Simca 1300 Bialbero	3 hours	Gran Premio Shell	World Sportscar Championship	report
1966–1967: Not held
1968	(Italy) Nino Vaccarella (Italy) Teodoro Zeccoli	(Italy) Autodelta	Alfa Romeo T33/2	500 km (310 mi)	500 km di Imola	Non-championship	report
1969	(Belgium) Jacky Ickx	(United Kingdom) J.W. Automotive Engineering	Mirage M3/300-Ford	500 km (310 mi)	500 km di Imola	Campionato Italiano Sport	report
1970	(United Kingdom) Brian Redman	(United Kingdom) J.W. Automotive Engineering	Porsche 917K	500 km (310 mi)	500 km di Imola	Campionato Italiano Sport	report
1971	(Austria) Helmut Marko	(West Germany) K. V. Wendt	Lola T212-Ford	1 hour, 30 minutes	Coppa di AC Bologna	European 2-Litre Championship; Campionato Italiano Sport	report
1972	(Italy) Arturo Merzario	(Italy) Ferrari SEFAC	Ferrari 312 PB	500 km (310 mi)	500 km di Imola	Campionato Italiano Sport	report
1973	(United Kingdom) Chris Craft	(United Kingdom) Crowne Racing	Lola T292-Ford	500 km (310 mi)	Trofeo Benellé	European 2-Litre Championship	report
1974–1975: Not held
1976	(West Germany) Jochen Mass (Belgium) Jacky Ickx	(West Germany) Martini Racing	Porsche 936	500 km (310 mi)	Trofeo Ignazio Giunti	World Sportscar Championship (Group 6); Italian Group 6 Championship	report
1977	(Italy) Vittorio Brambilla	(Italy) Autodelta SpA	Alfa Romeo T33/SC/12	250 km (160 mi)	250 km Imola	World Sportscar Championship (Group 6); Italian Group 6 Championship	report
1978–2012: Not held
2013	(France) Pierre Thiriet (Switzerland) Mathias Beche	(France) Thiriet by TDS Racing	Oreca 03	3 hours	3 Hours of Imola	European Le Mans Series	report
2014	(United Kingdom) Simon Dolan (United Kingdom) Harry Tincknell (Portugal) Filipe Albuquerque	(United Kingdom) Jota Sport	Zytek Z11SN	4 hours	4 Hours of Imola	European Le Mans Series	report
2015	(France) Pierre Thiriet (France) Ludovic Badey (France) Tristan Gommendy	(France) Thiriet by TDS Racing	Oreca 05	4 hours	4 Hours of Imola	European Le Mans Series	report
2016	(Switzerland) Mathias Beche (Japan) Ryō Hirakawa (France) Pierre Thiriet	(France) Thiriet by TDS Racing	Oreca 05	4 hours	4 Hours of Imola	European Le Mans Series	report
2017–2021: Not held
2022	(Italy) Lorenzo Colombo (Switzerland) Louis Delétraz (Austria) Ferdinand Habsburg	(Italy) Prema Racing	Oreca 07	4 Hours	4 Hours of Imola	European Le Mans Series	report
2023: Cancelled
2024	(Switzerland) Louis Delétraz (United Kingdom) Jonny Edgar (Poland) Robert Kubica	(United States) AO by TF	Oreca 07	4 Hours	4 Hours of Imola	European Le Mans Series	report
2025	(United Kingdom) Oliver Gray (France) Esteban Masson (France) Charles Milesi	(France) VDS Panis Racing	Oreca 07	4 Hours	4 Hours of Imola	European Le Mans Series	report
