= Abarth SE 08 =

Single seat racing car

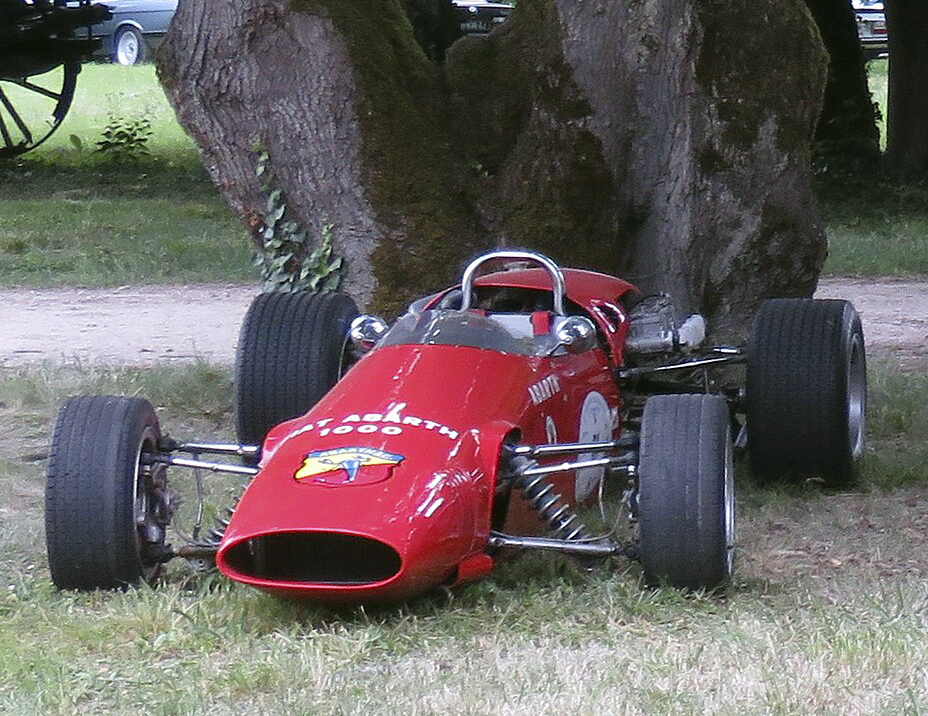
Abarth SE 08

The Abarth SE 08 is an open-wheel racing car, developed and built by Abarth in 1964.

== Development ==
The single-seater was originally designed to participate in the 1964 Formula 2 championship.

== Design ==
The car was equipped with a tubular-type spaceframe chassis, designed by Mario Colucci, and used a 1.3 L (79 cu in) twin-shaft four-cylinder engine, developing 120 hp (89 kW) developed by Mario Colucci on the basis of the one mounted on the Simca-Abarth 1300. It was also very light, weighing only 420 kg (930 lb).

== Racing history ==
The first test in which the car was deployed was the Vienna GP, where the car was the penultimate driven by Hans Herrmann. The same position was obtained shortly after by the driver Giacomo Russo at the ADAC-EifelRennen and at the Berlin GP, where Herrmann did not even manage to qualify. The last tests of the championship were equally disastrous, so much so that in the following season, after having equipped it with the new single-shaft engine, it was initially decided to enroll it in the Formula 3 championship, and then divert it to uphill races. Piloted by Franco Patria, it obtained the second overall position and the class victory in the Predappio-Rocca Delle Laminate Hillclimb. The same result was obtained by Tommy Spychiger in the Bolzano-Mendola, the car's last sporting appearance.
