= Simca 1000 Coupé =

Simca Coupé 1000 Simca 1200S
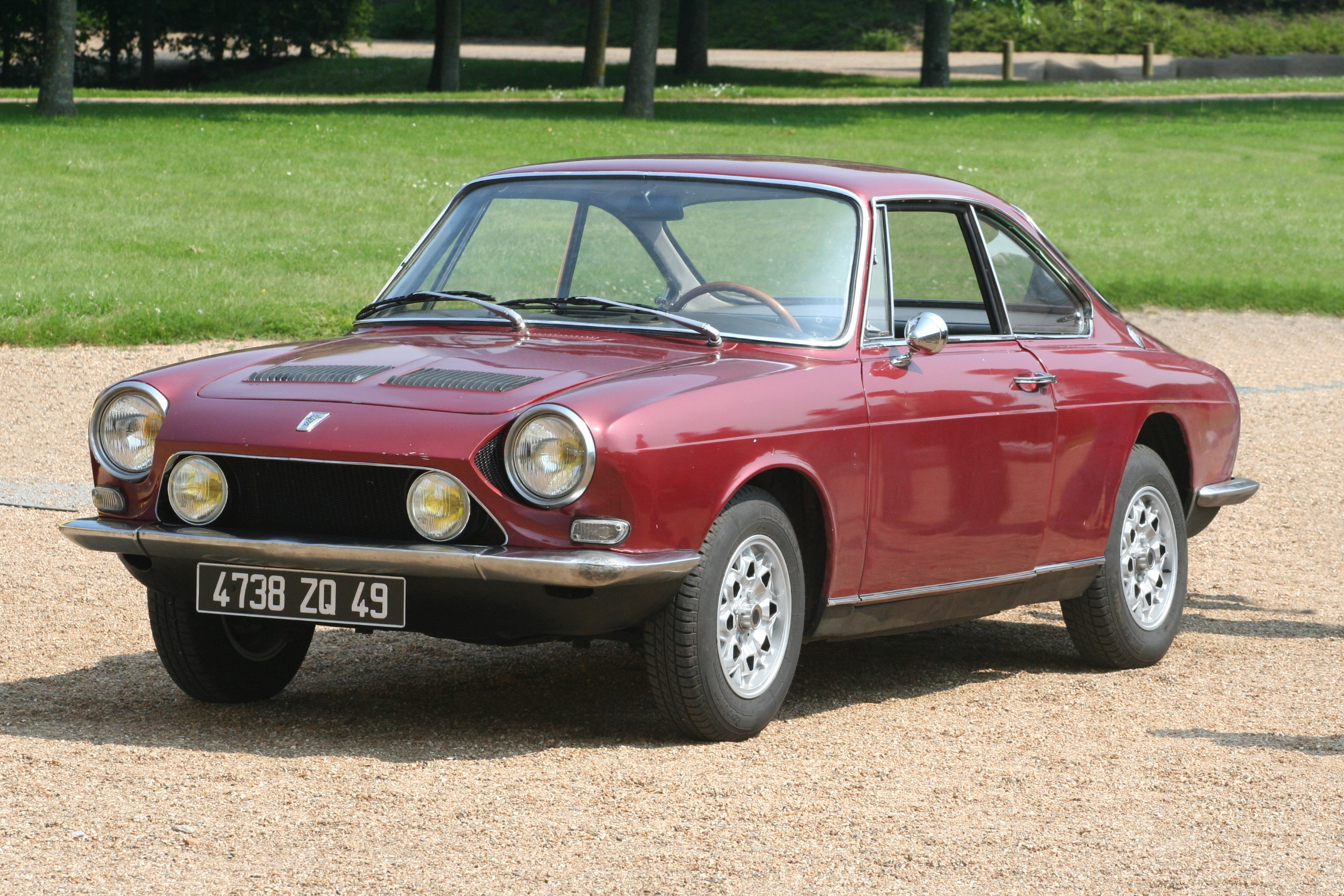
- Simca 1200 S

Overview
- Manufacturer: Simca and Bertone
- Production: 1962-1971
- Assembly: Poissy, France and Turin, Italy
- Designer: Giorgetto Giugiaro while with Studio Bertone

Body and chassis
- Class: Compact Coupé
- Body style: 2-door Coupé
- Layout: RR layout
- Related: Simca 1000

Powertrain
- Engine: 944 cc Type 315 OHV I4; 1204 cc Type 315 OHV I4
- Transmission: 4-speed manual all-synchromesh

Dimensions
- Wheelbase: 2,220 mm (87.4 in)
- Length: 3,925 mm (154.5 in); 3,990 mm (157.1 in)
- Width: 1,525 mm (60.0 in); 1,530 mm (60.2 in)
- Height: 1,255 mm (49.4 in); 1,270 mm (50.0 in)
- Curb weight: 795 kg (1000 Coupé); 890 kg (1200 S)

The Simca Coupé 1000 and its successor, the Simca 1200S are small, rear-engined two-door coupés (described by one well informed commentator as “Pseudo-sportives”) which were produced by Simca between 1962 and 1971. Simca also provided the engine and the mechanical underpinnings while the bodies were built in Turin by Bertone before being transferred for final assembly to Simca's Poissy plant and an assembly plant in Rotterdam (1200S only) on specially configured trains.

The change of name in 1967 marked a major upgrade that included the installation of a more powerful engine and styling adjustments enforced by moving the radiator from the rear to the front of the car. This improved weight distribution, but the engine itself remained at the back.

== Origins and launch ==
The Simca 1000 saloon was launched in France in October 1961 and was an instant success with French buyers, but the response in export markets was much more muted. The new management at Simca were keen to raise the profile of their new car internationally. Mindful of the precedent set by Renault with their (initially Frua bodied) Renault Floride, Simca turned initially to Facel to discuss a joint project with Facel producing the bodies, but in the judgement of Henri Pigozzi, Simca's aging but still unusually “hands on” boss, Facel's proposal lacked the necessary style and was considered unrealistic: there were also concerns that Facel's perilous financial position might impact the project adversely. Simca then turned to Bertone and commissioned a coupe version of their new car. Bertone gave the job to a recently recruited young designer called Giorgetto Giugiaro and the car, having already been heavily trailed, was formally launched at the Geneva Motor Show early in 1962, though official French homologation for production only took place in November 1962: customer deliveries began in 1963. The style of the car was widely admired, but the cost of the Bertone-built body made it difficult for the car to compete on price alone, while use of the standard 944 cc engine block from the Simca 1000 meant that performance was unlikely to live up to its racy styling. From the start Simca presented the Coupé 1000 as a separate model.

== The car ==
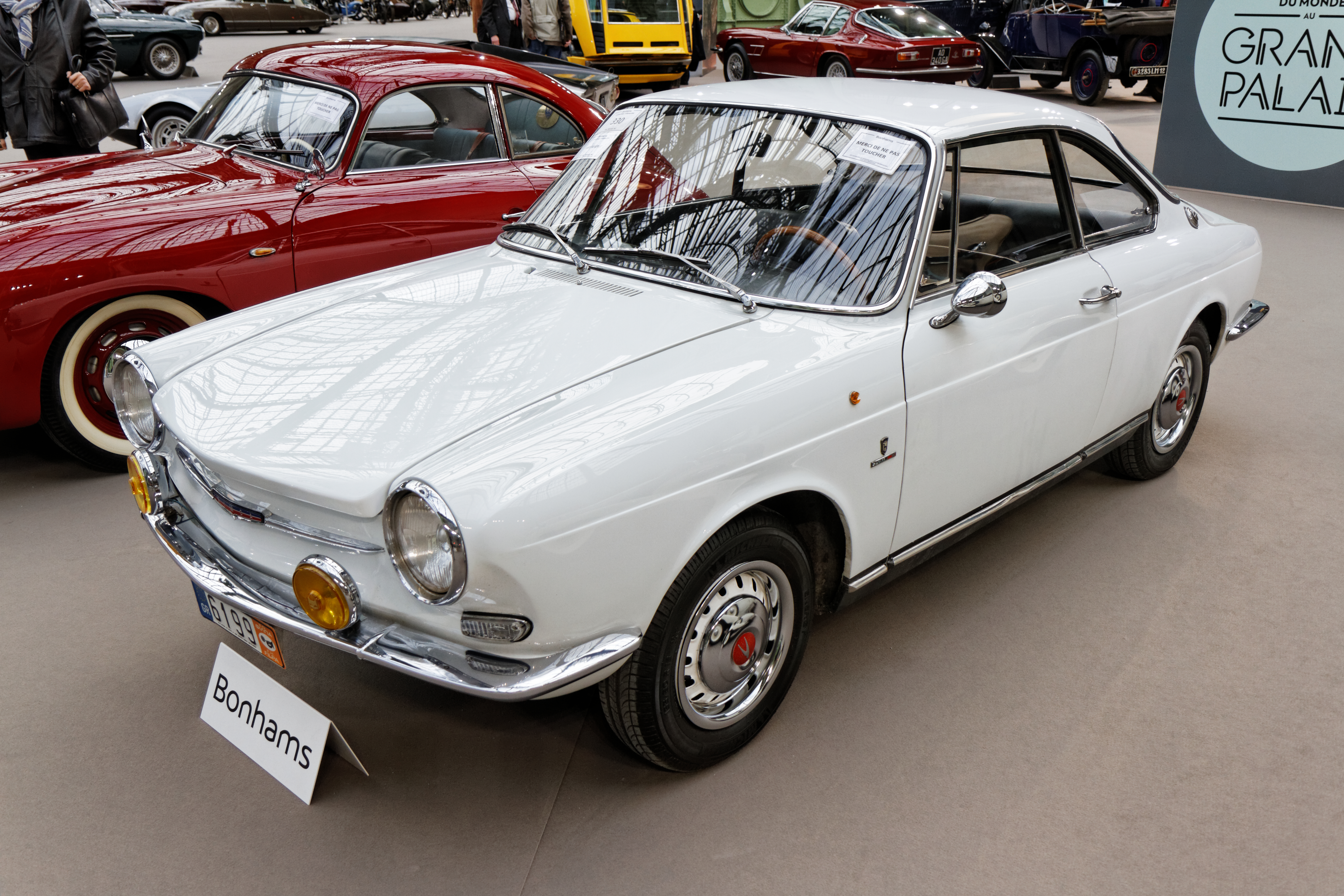
1967 Simca 1000 Coupé

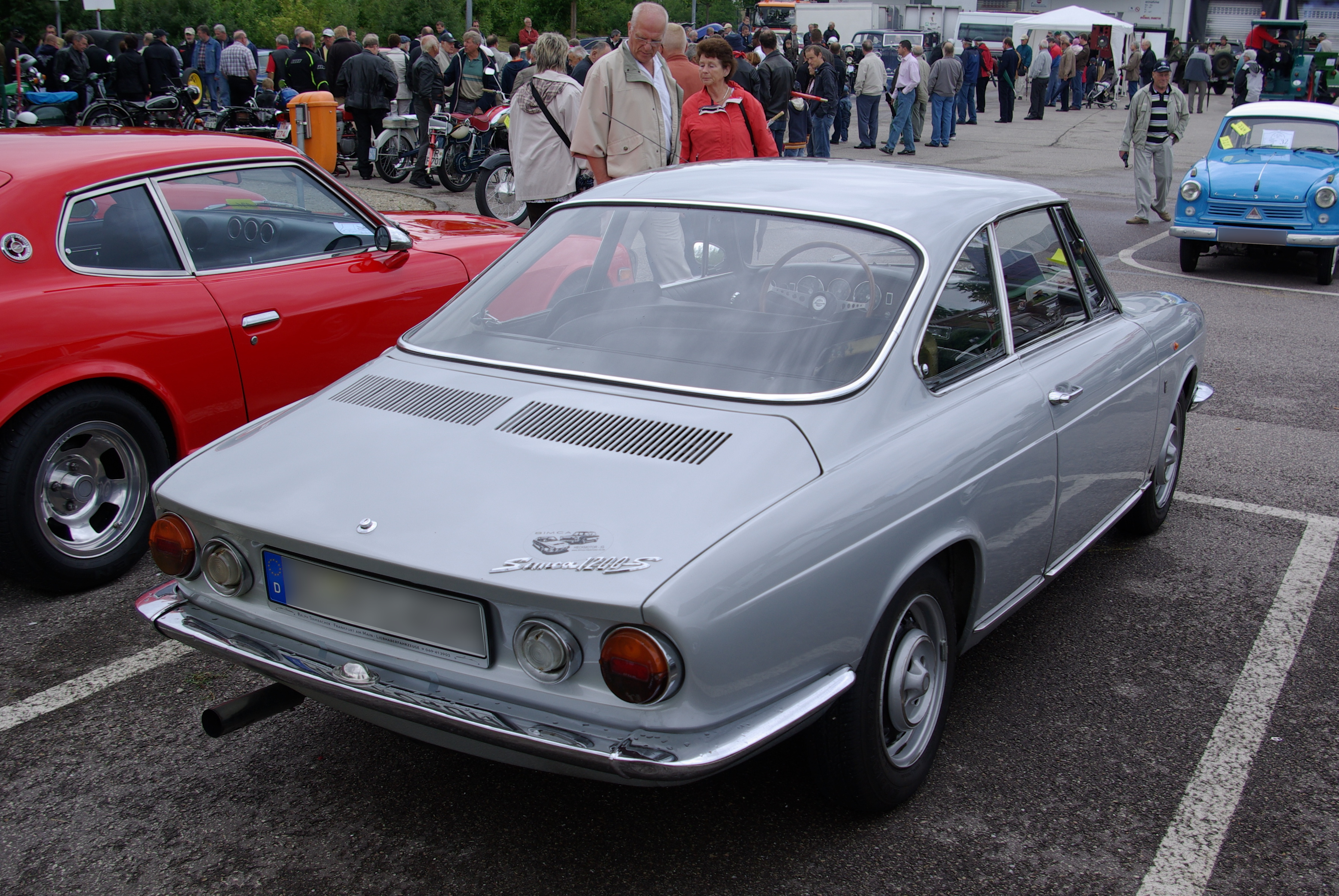
Simca 1200S

Despite sharing its chassis and mechanical elements with the boxy Simca 1000 saloon, the Coupé was able to offer superior road holding and performance because its centre of gravity was lower and its shape more aerodynamic.

Between the car's appearance at the Swiss motor show in March 1962 and customer deliveries, the front side lights moved from a position beside the headlights, integrated into the front wings, to a location directly above the front bumper. It is not clear whether this was a response to regulatory requirements or simply a change driven by production-cost considerations.

On the inside, the interior fittings contrasted with the stark interior of the Simca 1000 saloon, and the generous display of gauges and switches on the dashboard separated it from the more plain view from the driver's seat through the steering wheel on the four-door car.

In its original form, the Simca was thought in the 1960s to resemble the cheaper Fiat 850 Coupé, although that car was launched only in 1965. In the French market, where the great majority of the cars would be sold, the Simca Coupé 1000 was pitched squarely against the Renault Floride.

The water-cooled 4-cylinder 944 cc engine shared its dimensions and basic layout with the engine fitted in the saloon, but the Coupé engine featured a higher compression ratio and provided a maximum 52 hp (38 kW) of claimed output (as against 45 hp (33 kW) in the saloon). A maximum speed of 140 km/h (87 mph) was listed (as against 125 km/h (78 mph) for the saloon). Stopping power was also better on the Coupé which, unusually at this time, featured disc brakes on all four wheels.

During the early years the car experienced modest success on the French market, especially among young affluent buyers. Between the 1962 launch and the 1967 upgrade approximately 10,600 were produced.

== Upgrade ==
By 1962 Simca's midrange cars had been replaced and in 1967 the focus of the manufacturer's volume cars switched to the new Simca 1100. The Simca brand image was becoming increasingly starchy and the "sheep in wolf's clothing" image of the Simca Coupe 1000 did little to improve it.

Bertone was commissioned to upgrade the body. This was achieved by adding a pair of grilles to the top of the bonnet/hood, shamelessly emulating a design theme of the Lamborghini Miura. It was also necessary to add an opening at the front for a grille, now that the radiator was moved to the front of the car. Otherwise the profile of the car was little changed.

At the back, the engine was now replaced by a four-cylinder in-line water-cooled 1204 cc unit which would later find its way into versions of the Simca 1100. The car was renamed as the Simca 1200S, and in this form, supported by two carburetors, the engine produced a maximum 80 hp (59 kW) of power, allowing Simca to claim a top speed of 175 km/h (109 mph).

In 1968 a further upgrade saw the claimed power increased to 85 hp (63 kW) and the claimed top speed to 179 km/h (111 mph).

== Commercial ==
The 1960s was a decade of growing prosperity in France. By the time production of the 1200S ended in 1971, approximately 25,000 of its bodies had made the train journey, mounted on their sides in two rows, on the specially configured railway wagons from Bertone's workshops in Turin to Simca's plant at Poissy and for transformation into completed cars. Because of capacity problems in Poissy, a total of 3114 1200S were assembled at Chrysler Benelux's assembly plant in Rotterdam.

The Simca 1200S was not immediately replaced, although the Matra Bagheera launched in 1973 can be seen as a belated replacement.
