= Abarth Simca 1300 GT =

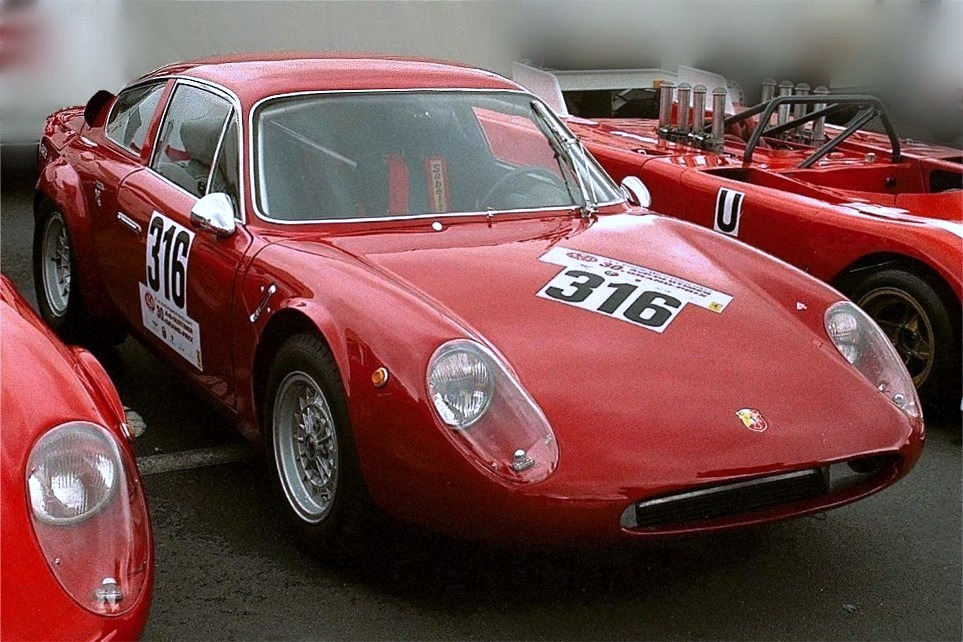

Overview
- Manufacturer: Abarth
- Production: 1962–1965
- Designer: Mario Colucci

Body and chassis
- Class: Sports car
- Layout: FR
- Related: Abarth Simca 2000; Fiat Abarth OT 1300; Simca 1000

Powertrain
- Engine: 1288 cc DOHC I4; 1592 cc DOHC I4
- Transmission: 4-speed manual

Dimensions
- Wheelbase: 2,090 mm (82.3 in)
- Length: 3,550 mm (139.8 in)
- Width: 1,480 mm (58.3 in)
- Height: 1,140 mm (44.9 in)
- Curb weight: 630 kg (1,389 lb)

The Abarth-Simca 1300 GT is a sports racing car built by Abarth from 1962 to 1965. Abarth realized that the Fiat 600-based cars had reached their maximum potential and chose the similarly laid out Simca for their next car, especially since the Simca engine (with its crossflow head) offered great tuning possibilities.

== History ==
The Abarth-Simca 1300 was the first product born from the collaboration between Carlo Abarth and Simca. The negotiations between the two companies were mediated by the Austrian engineer Rudolf Hruska, who had previously worked with Carlo Abarth at Cisitalia in 1949 and was a technical consultant at Simca in the early 1960s. To strengthen the brand's image during the launch of the new Simca 1000, the French manufacturer, under the direction of Henri Théodore Pigozzi, wanted a partner to create a sports version as Fiat had been doing for years in Italy.

Pigozzi agreed with Abarth to develop a family of cars using the Simca 1000 as a basis. At the start of 1961, an agreement was signed between the two manufacturers for the supply of:

- a sports car built from the production saloon, but with a 1,150 cc engine,
- a coupé intended for competition, based on the platform of the production car but fitted with a new, Abarth-designed engine.

This project was the first of its kind entrusted to Abarth by the manufacturer. Never before had Abarth had to manage a complete project; most of the time, he was “content” with preparing or modifying existing cars.

In 1964, Simca was taken over by the American Chrysler Corporation. The new owners put a halt to the collaboration with Abarth, because of the company's close ties to Fiat. The last Abarth Simcas were sold in 1965.

== Description ==
The Abarth-Simca 1300 (model code AB 130) was based on a shortened floorpan of the Simca 1000. The car was officially presented at the Geneva Motor Show on March 15, 1962. The chassis, gearbox, steering, and front and rear axles were retained. The bodywork, on the other hand, was revolutionized with a new design, which followed the shape and rounded lines of the Zagato-designed coupés, such as the Fiat-Abarth 850 and Fiat-Abarth 1000. The project was developed by Abarth's chief engineer Mario Colucci. To create the aluminum bodywork, Carlo Abarth and Colucci relied on small local companies: from 1963 onwards entirely to Carrozzeria Sibona-Basano, before that to Beccaris, both from Turin. Early cars had a rounded rear end; this was later replaced by a cut-off ("coda tronca") design.

The engine was also completely redesigned. Also mounted at the rear, the displacement was increased to 1.3 litres (1,288 cc) thanks to increased bore and stroke of 76 mm × 71 mm (2.99 in × 2.80 in). The Abarth-designed, chain-driven, twin-cam cylinder head was equipped with a twin-shaft distribution, the compression ratio increased to 10.4:1, and twin Weber 45DCOE double-barrel carburetors were adopted; thanks to these modifications it delivered 125 hp (92 kW) at 6,000 rpm. The lubrication was dry sump with two oil pumps and a radiator was fitted in the front. The GT road version reached a top speed of around 230 km/h (143 mph). Drivers immediately complained about the car's random road behavior, demanding a more performance-tuned chassis, which was not possible, given Simca's budget constraints; this forced Abarth to find tricks to obtain sufficient handling.

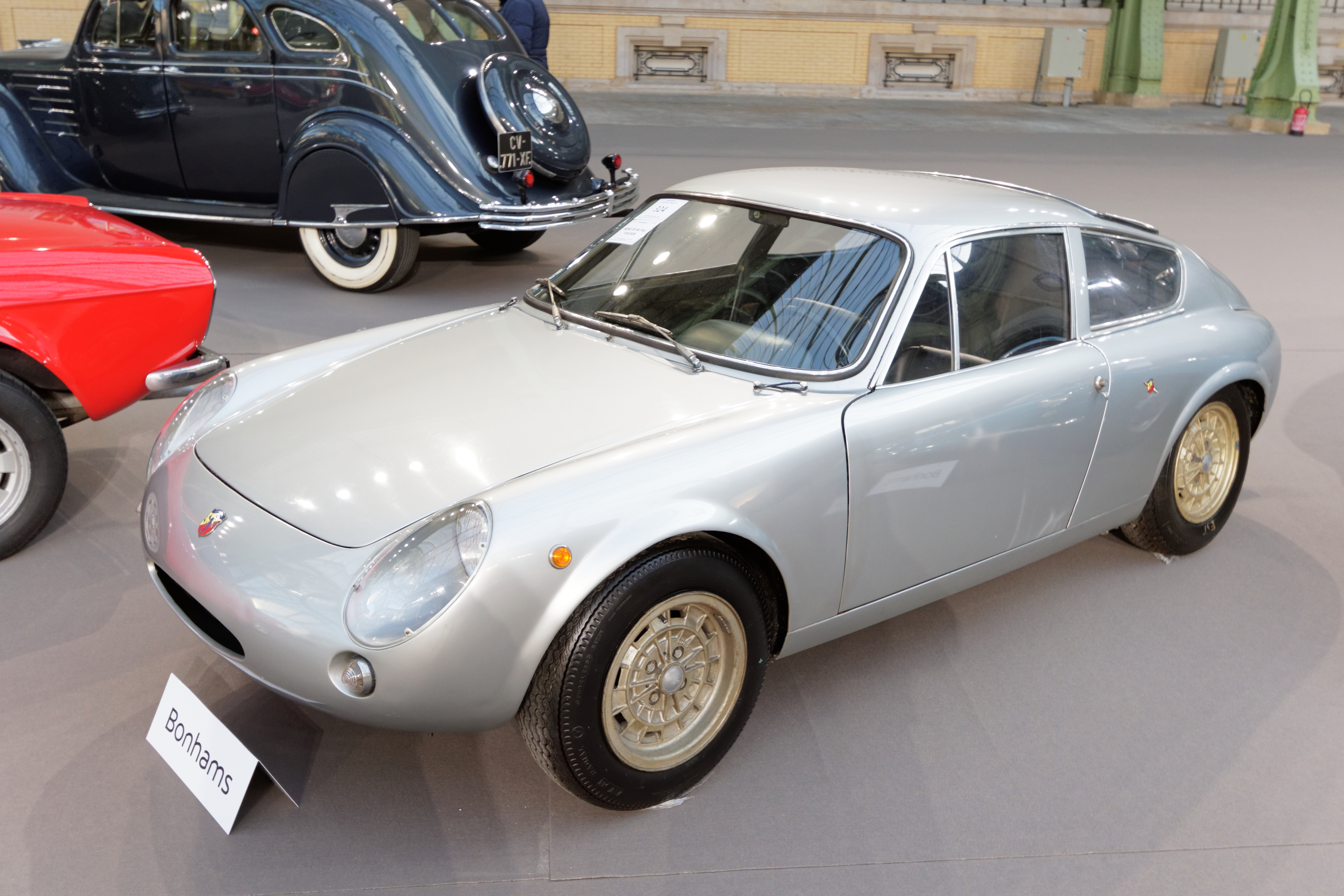
1965 Abarth-Simca 1300 GT Corsa

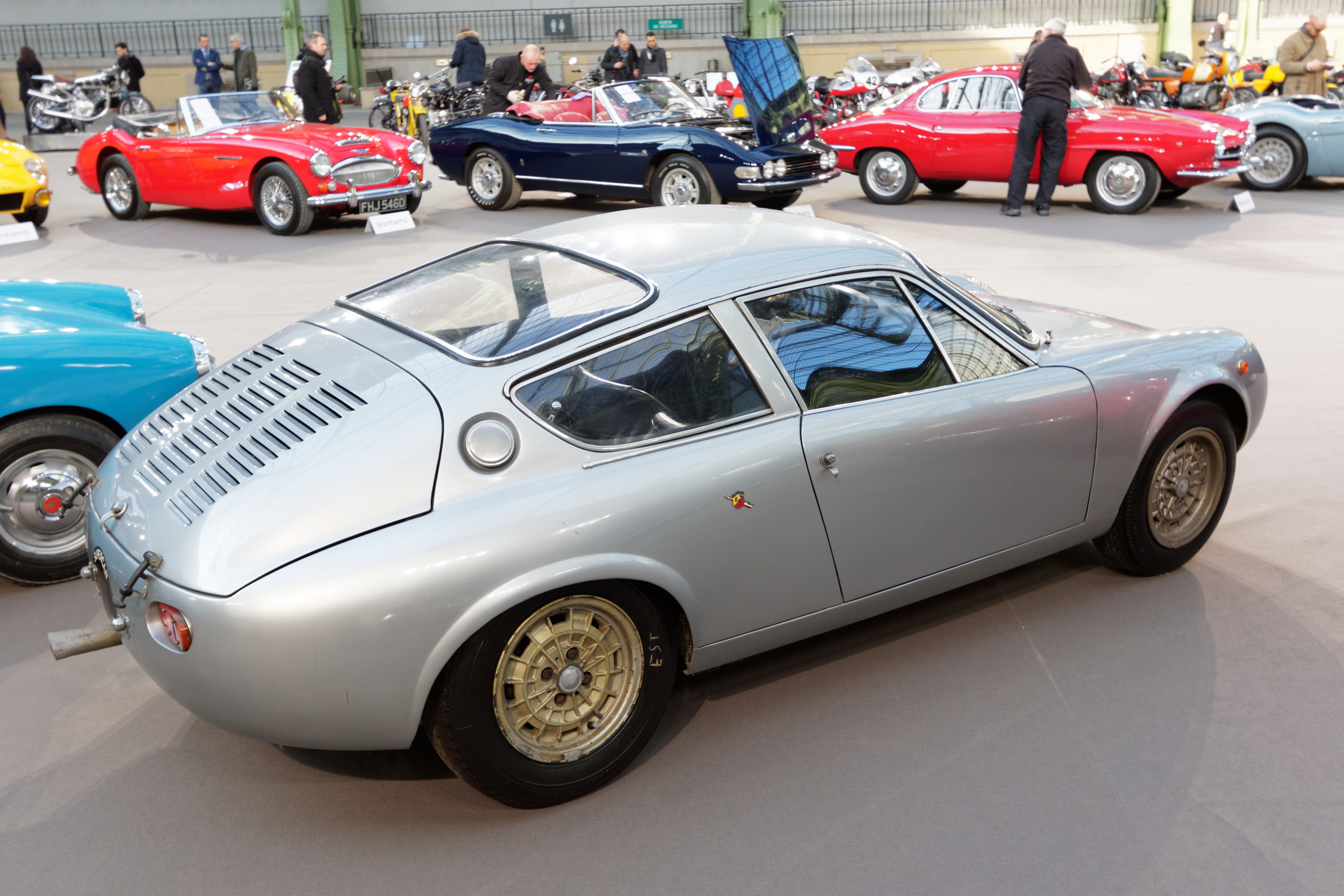
1965 Abarth-Simca 1300 GT Corsa, rear

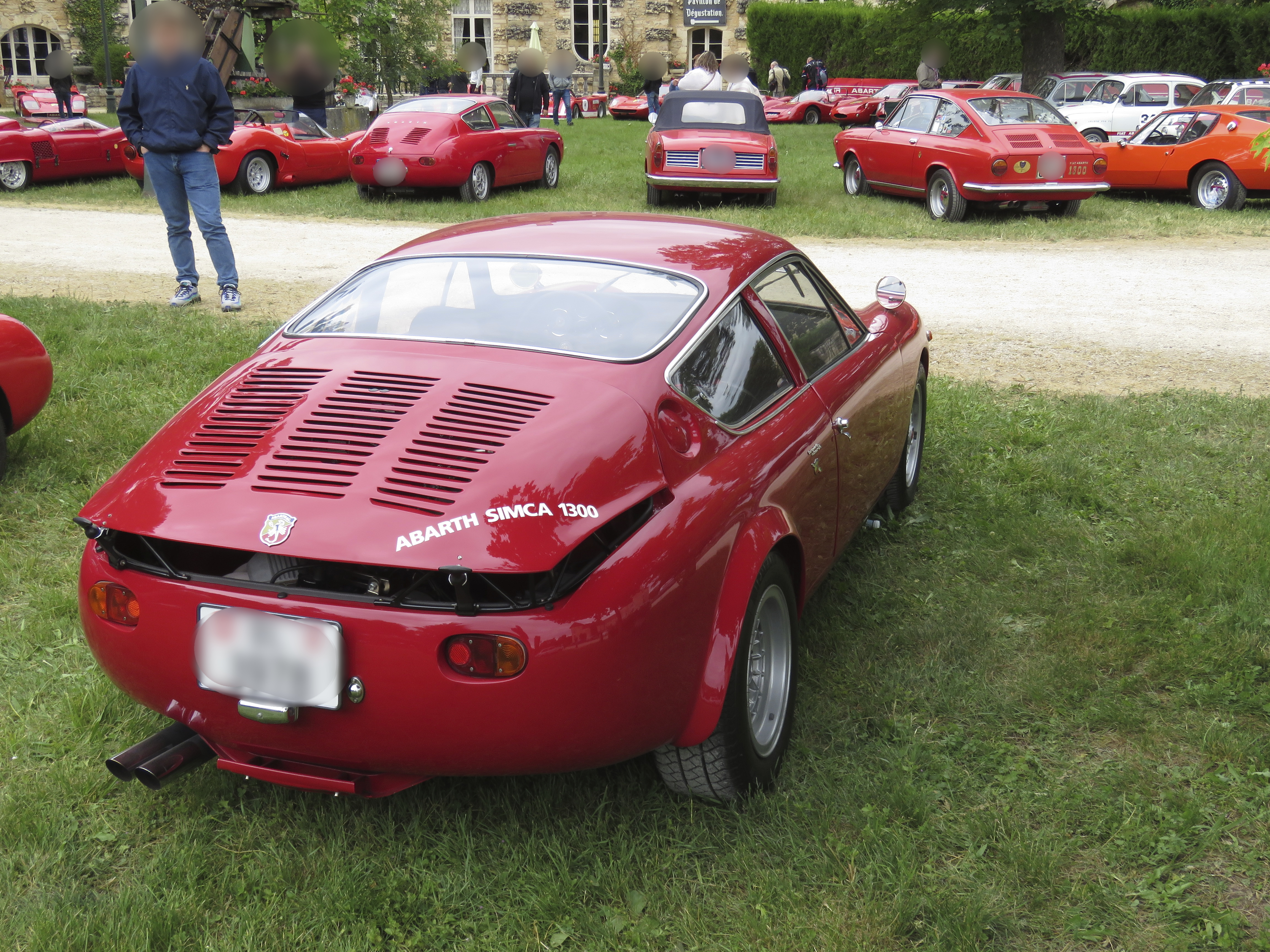
Abarth Simca 1300 GT, rear (early design)

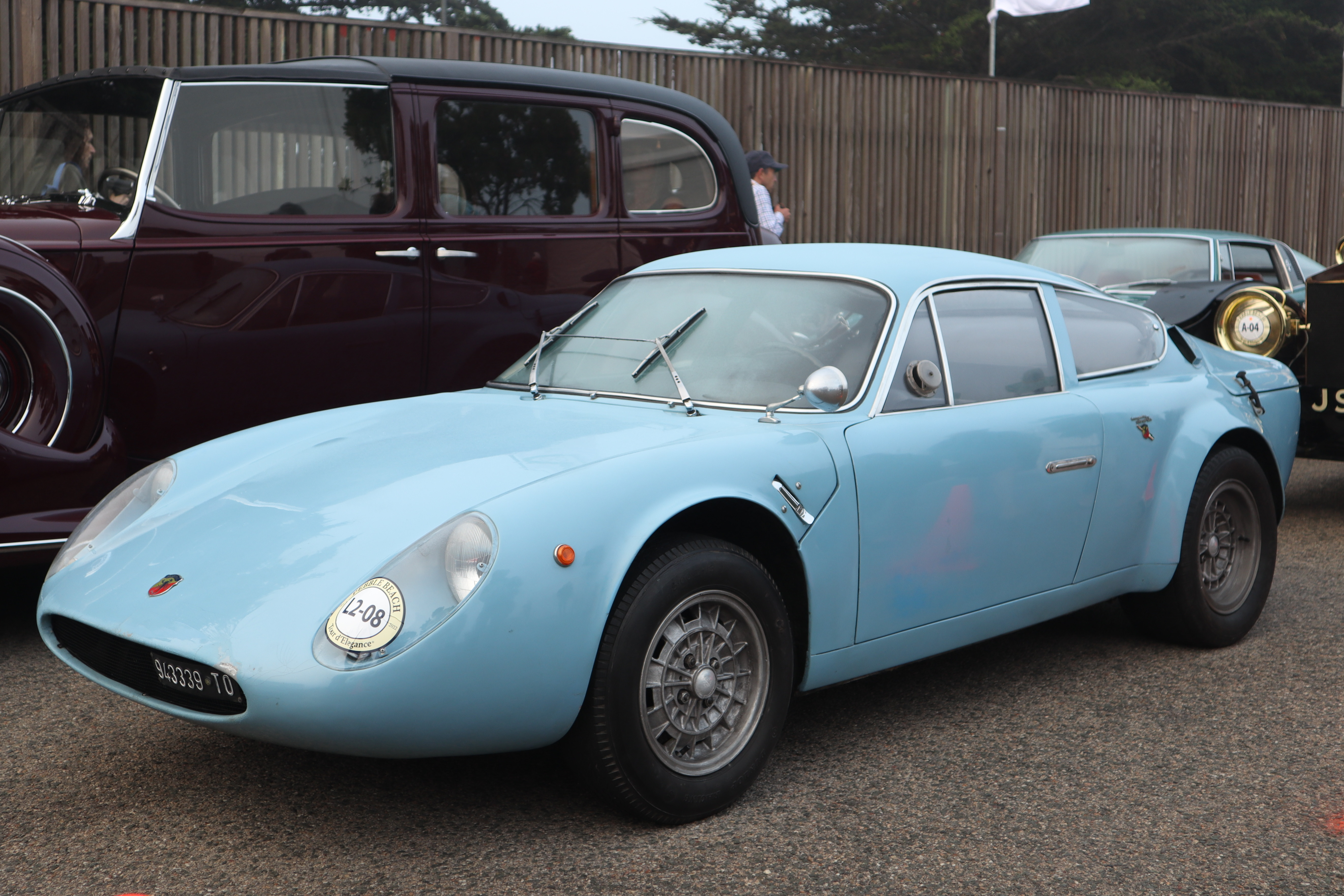
Abarth-Simca 1300GT, later design with longer nose and tail

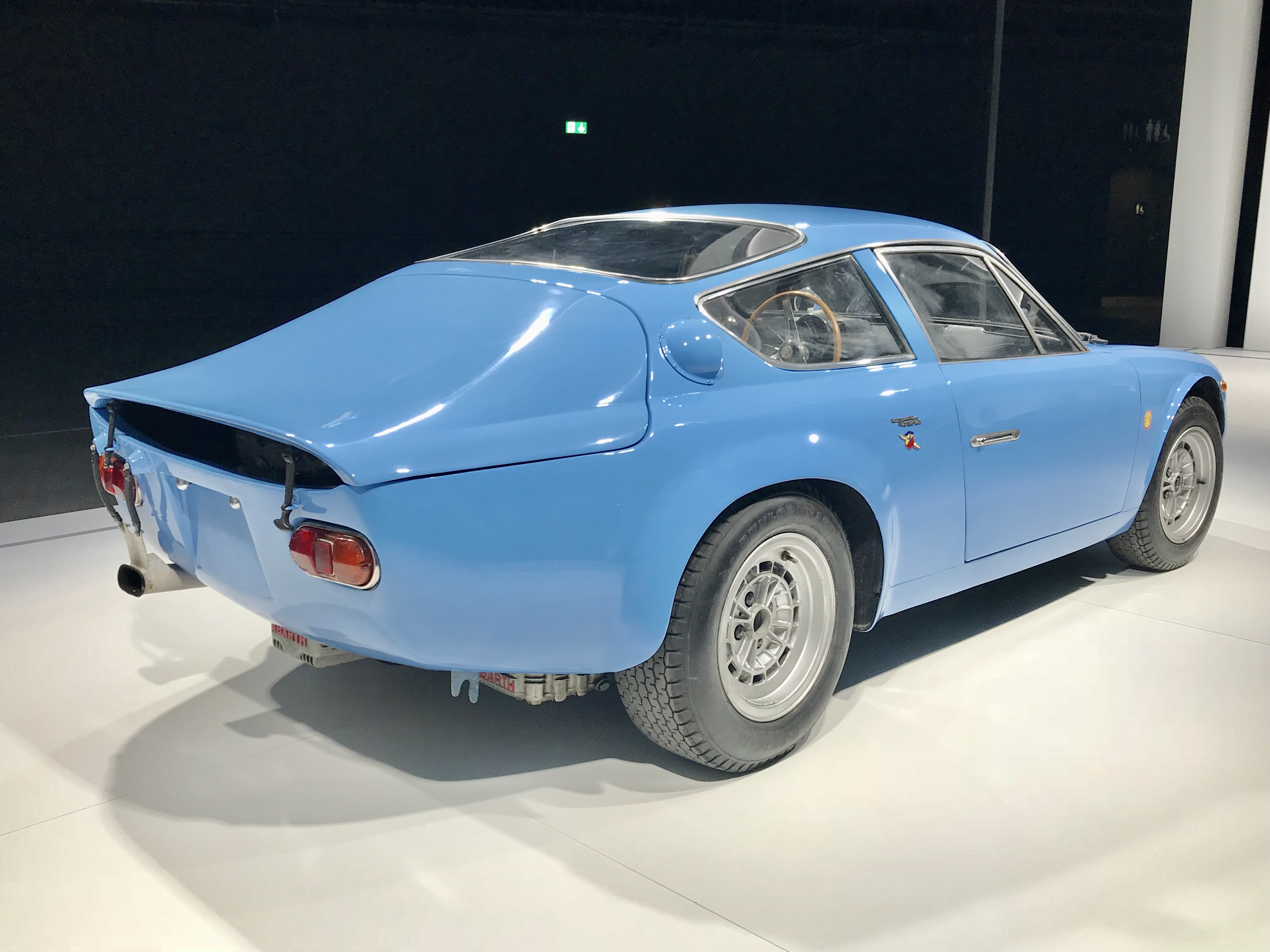
Abarth-Simca 1300GT Corsa, rear (revised design)

=== Spider ===
The Spider Sport version was not part of the agreement with Simca but was developed on Carlo Abarth;s own initiative. This roadster, given the internal model code AB 130S, was built on an Abarth tubular chassis. The car won the first race in which it participated. Nonetheless, Simca did not follow up on this version.

=== Abarth Simca 1600 GT ===
The short-lived 1600 GT was presented on February 15, 1963. It was directly derived from the previous 1300 GT, but with a larger engine and a revised chassis. The new engine featured five main bearings (rather than the three bearings of the 1300), and was shorter overall. It also received twin spark plugs and had its compression ratio increased to 10.8:1. The bore was increased from 76 to 86 mm (2.99 to 3.39 in), while the stroke was shortened to 68.5 mm (2.70 in). Displacement was up to 1,592 cc (1.6 L), while power went up to 138 hp (101 kW) at 7,800 rpm. The 1600s all received the longer, 'duck tail' rear end.

Abarth also offered a 6-speed gearbox, fitted into the original, Simca casing. The 1600 GT's life was cut very short because the International Sports Federation announced, during the summer of 1963, the abolition of the 1600 cc Grand Touring category. Abarth naturally chose to focus on the 2000 GT instead, which was to be the last model in this range.

== Racing History ==
The car was homologated in the Grand Touring category on October 8, 1962, the racing version being faster by 20 km/h. The car's first race, however, dates to April 14, 1962, during the Lure hill climb, near Dijon. Of the 58 cars entered, there were three Abarth Simca 1300 GTs, one with Spider Sport bodywork on a tubular chassis and two in Coupé version, including the one driven by Jean Guichet who obtained the best lap time in practice. The winner was Gianni Balzarini aboard the 1300 GT Spider; the two 1300 GT Coupés took second and third place overall. Lucien Bianchi then won the Trophée d'Auvergne, a circuit race in Clermont-Ferrand, later the same year.

Jean Guichet took a GT class victory at the Autumn Cup in Monza. At the 1962 24 Hours of Le Mans, Balzarini shared an Abarth-Simca 1300 with Austrian Franz Albert. Their race ended after 30 laps due to a transmission problem. Nine laps on, a second 1300 Bialbero by Frenchman Henri Oreiller and Tommy Spychigerhe retired with the same problem. The transmission was based on Simca's own unit; originally designed to handle about 40 PS (29 kW) it was not able withstand multiple amounts of power, esepecially when exposed to the rigors of racing.

In 1963, Hans Herrmann achieved a class victory at the 3 Hours of Daytona and then at the 12 Hours of Sebring.

== Championships ==
- International Grand Touring Championship 1964 - Constructors, Division I
- International GT Championship 1965 - Constructors, Division I
