= Abarth Simca 2000 =

Italian race car

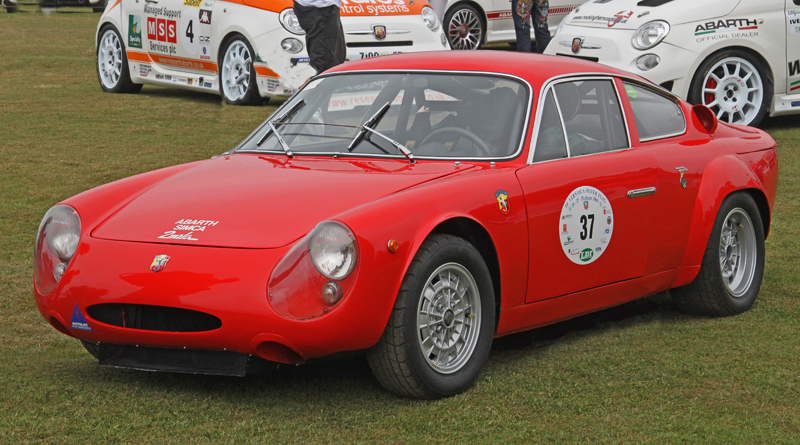

Overview
- Manufacturer: Abarth and Simca
- Production: 1963-1965
- Assembly: Turin, Italy

Body and chassis
- Layout: RR layout
- Related: Abarth Simca 1300 GT; Fiat Abarth OT 2000

Powertrain
- Power output: 185–204 hp (136–150 kW)

Dimensions
- Wheelbase: 2,090 mm (82.3 in)
- Length: 3,609 mm (142.1 in)
- Width: 1,480 mm (58.3 in)
- Height: 1,200 mm (47.2 in)

The Abarth Simca 2000 was an Italian high-performance automobile produced in small numbers in the 1960s as a collaborative project of the Simca and Abarth companies in Turin, Italy. It was mainly intended for competition.

== History ==
After the successful racing exploits of the 1300 GT, Carlo Abarth and Henri Théodore Pigozzi agreed to continue this cooperation but let Abarth improve the chassis to be used for a new, more powerful car. After a very brief transition with the 1600 GT, which was immediately rendered uncompetitive by a regulation change, the 2000 GT was presented at the Geneva Motor Show on March 15, 1963. It bears the factory code AB 136. The first deliveries to individuals began in April 1964. At the same time, Abarth was developing the modifications that it was going to offer directly to its experienced customers and drivers who would use this car in international competition. The car was continuosly under development during the production run. In fact, during the Bologna Passo Della Raticosa hill climb, Abarth used a car with a shortened front end, dubbed "Muso Corto," which would be used on all cars delivered to customers.

Once again, Simca forced Abarth to use the chassis, the gearbox, and the suspension of the Simca 1000 – albeit deeply modified by Abarth – which had already penalized the 1300 GT in competition and which also limited the sporting pretensions of the 2000 GT. The gearbox was the weakest point because of its proven fragility, even on the much less powerful 1300 model. When the new American management of Simca officially took over the reins of the company on January 1, 1964, the agreement signed with Abarth was terminated with effect from December 31, 1964. This proved to be a godsend for Abarth, which was able to fit its own gearbox and win many races while giving Simca the benefit of free publicity.

In 1966, the rules of the Fédération Internationale de Sport Automobile changed again and the Abarth 2000 GT had to move from the GT category to the Sport category; it included many experienced competitors who perfectly mastered the regulations of this category and its tricks. The Abarth Corse team used the 2000 GT along with the Fiat Abarth OT 2000 (which used the same engine) until the end of the 1968 season, when both were replaced by the Abarth 2000 Sport.

== Design ==
The Abarth-Simca 2000 was a coupé powered by a four-cylinder Abarth engine of 1946 cc, rated at 192 PS (141 kW). Its maximum speed was listed as 168 mph (270 km/h). The front track is 1,270 mm (50.0 in), and its rear track is 1,300 mm (51.2 in). Its fuel tank held 6.6 imperial gallons, although optional tanks of 12.1, 18.7 and 24.2 imperial gallons were also available. Its empty weight was 690 kg (1,521 lb).

The radiator-cooling inlet was a low-set oval in a forward-thrusting nose; there was no obvious forward bumper. The two headlights were set under transparent fairings. The bonnet was long and markedly sloped. Its windshield was more highly sloped than most contemporary vehicles. An upturned air deflector was mounted atop the rear trunk.

The gasoline tank was filled through a lid-covered cap located at the upper-right hand corner of the nearly-flat rear window.

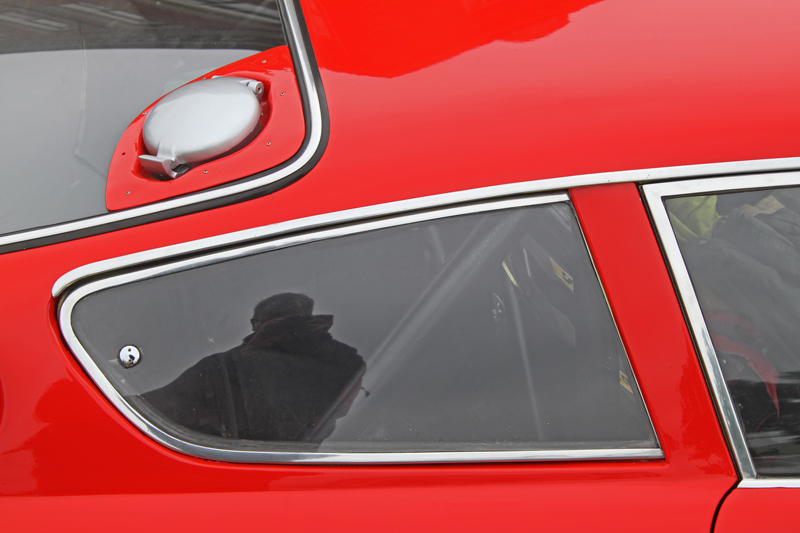
Window filler cap

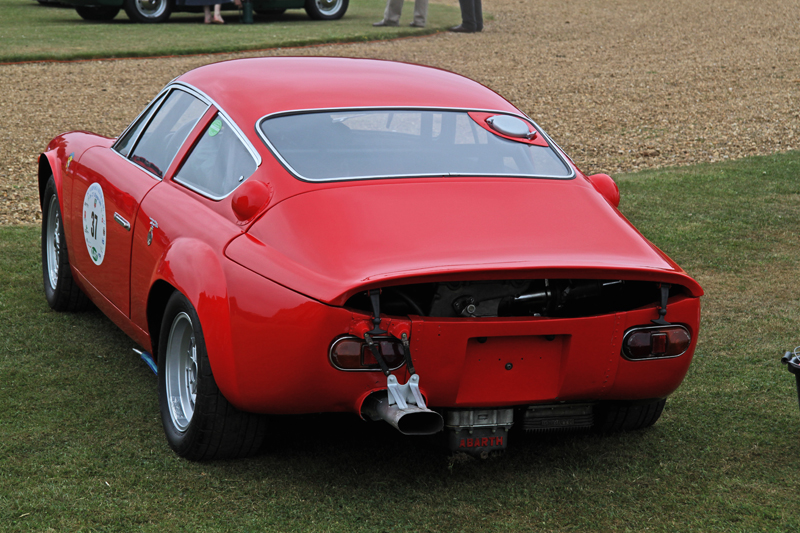
Rear view

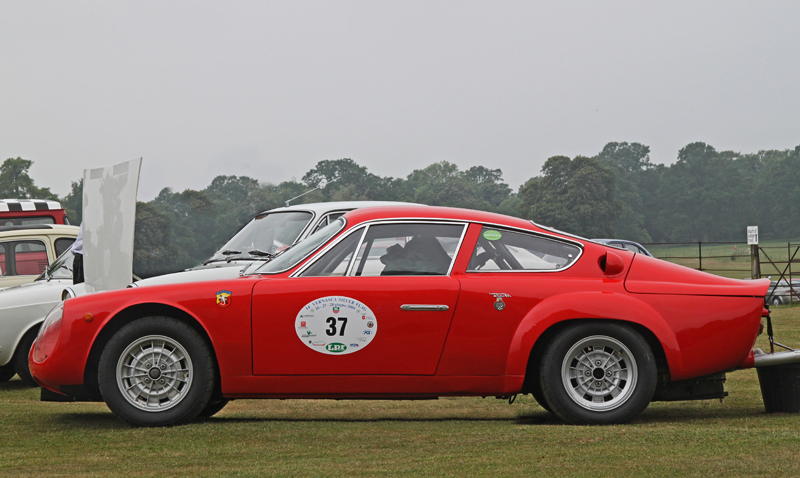
Side view; muso corto design

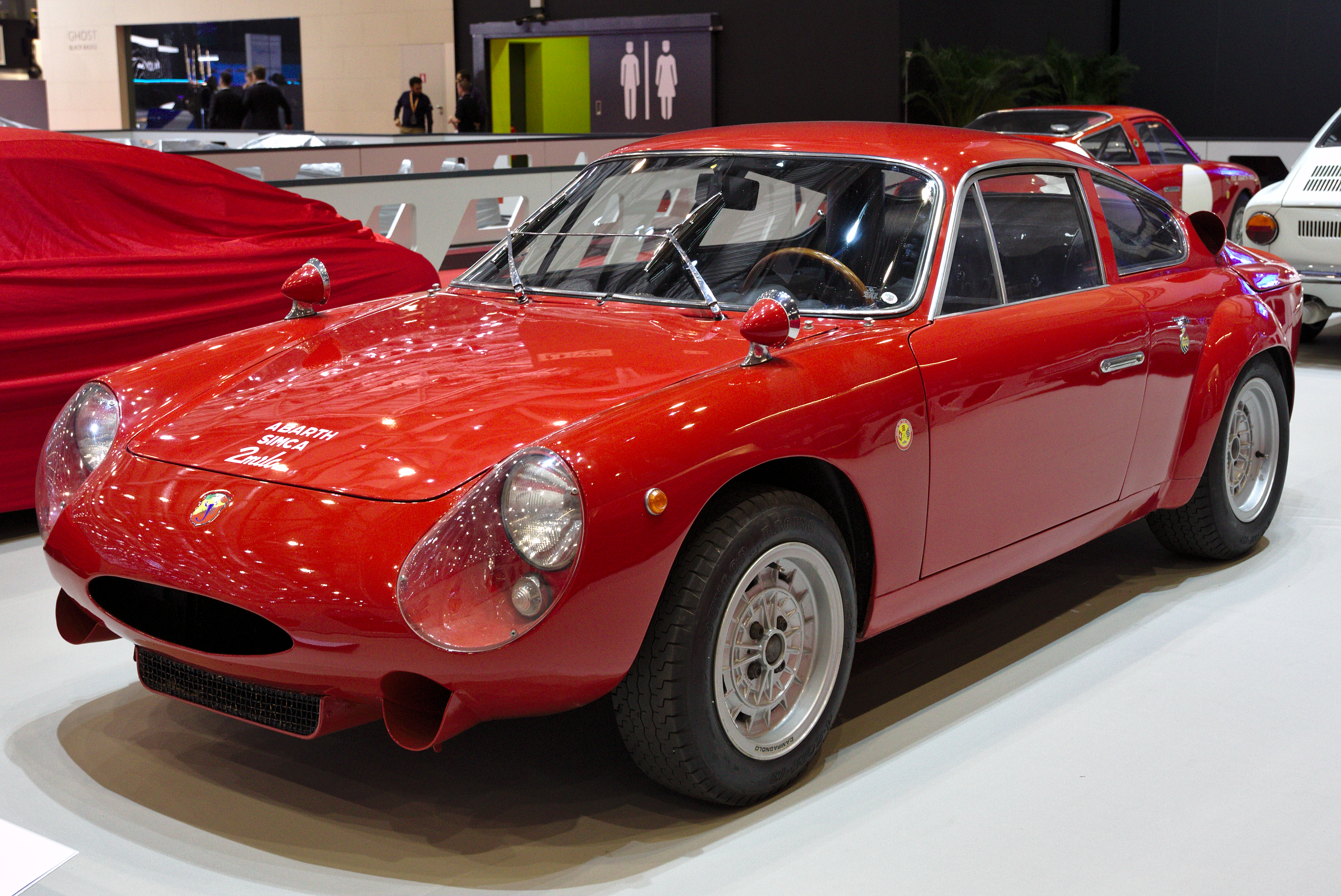
Abarth Simca 2000
