= Simca 1000 =

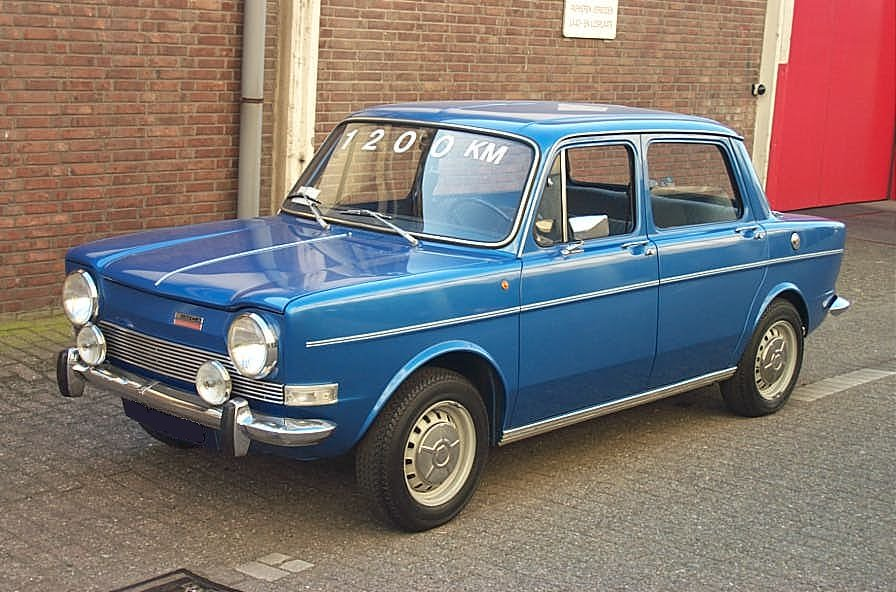
- 1973 Simca 1000 GL

Overview
- Manufacturer: Simca
- Also called: Simca 900; Simca 4 CV; Simca Sim'4; Simca 1118; Simca 1005/1006
- Production: 1961–1978
- Assembly: Poissy, France; Villaverde, Spain; Bogotá, Colombia (GM Colmotores); Arica, Chile (Manufacturas Nun y German S.A.C.I); Casablanca, Morocco
- Designer: Mario Boano

Body and chassis
- Class: Small Family Car (C)/Supermini (B)
- Body style: 4-door saloon
- Layout: RR layout
- Related: Simca 1000 Coupé/1200S

Powertrain
- Engine: 777 cc type 359 ohv I4; 844 cc Poissy type ohv I4 (Spain); 944 cc type 315/349/1D1 ohv I4; 1118 cc type 351/1E1 ohv I4; 1204 cc type 353 ohv I4 (Spain); 1294 cc type 371/1G ohv I4
- Transmission: 4-speed manual all-synchromesh

Dimensions
- Wheelbase: 2,220 mm (87.4 in)
- Length: 3,785 mm (149.0 in)
- Width: 1,473 mm (58.0 in)
- Height: 1,335 mm (52.6 in)
- Curb weight: 730 kg (35% front)

The Simca 1000, or Simca Mille in French, is a small, boxy rear-engined four-door saloon, manufactured for 18 years by French automaker Simca, from 1961 to 1978.

== Origins ==
The origins of the Simca 1000 do not lie in France but in Italy. Simca's President-director general, Henri Pigozzi, had been born in Turin and had known Fiat's founder, Giovanni Agnelli, from 1922 until Agnelli's death in 1945. Fiat would remain Simca's dominant share holder until 1963. Pigozzi remained a regular visitor to Fiat's vast Turin operation throughout his time as the head of Simca, and when Pigozzi visited, he was as an honoured friend.

Following the launch in 1955 of the well received Fiat 600, Fiat's development department, still headed up by the designer-engineer Dante Giacosa, set about planning for its successor. The replacement foreseen would be a little larger and more powerful than the current car, reflecting growing prosperity in Italy at the time. Two projects were run in parallel: “Project 119” was for a two-door successor, building on the strengths of the current model, while “Project 122” was for a more radically differentiated four door successor. The entrance to the inner sanctum of Fiat's Development Department would have been blocked to most visitors, but Pigozzi's privileged relationship with the Agnellis opened even these doors, and during the late 1950s he took a particular interest in the department. It became clear that Pigozzi's intentions to extend the Simca range further down, in the small car market segment, aligned closely with Fiat's projects “119” and “122”, intended to build a presence up-market from the small (3.22 m (10.6 ft) long) Fiat 600. Pigozzi obtained the agreement of the Fiat directors to select one of the six different rather boxy four-door clay models and mock-ups that then comprised the output of “Project 122” to be developed into Simca's new small car.

The head of the Simca styling department, Mario Revelli de Beaumont, was born in Rome in 1907. He had transferred from General Motors in 1955. Dividing his time between Fiat's Industrial Design Centre at Turin and Simca's Styling Centre at Poissy, Revelli de Beaumont spent the two years between 1959 and 1961 working with Fiat's Felice Mario Boano, developing the Simca 1000 to production readiness. Although the surviving prototypes differ in detail, the basic architecture and boxy shape of the car had evidently been “right first time” and the Simca 1000 of 1961 is entirely recognizable as the model that Pigozzi had selected from Fiat's “Project 122”. In the meantime, in Italy the Fiat 600 continued to sell strongly and there was little sense of urgency about investing to replace it. Management evidently decided that a four-door replacement for the 600 would represent too big a jump from the existing car. However, in 1964 the fruits of “Project 119” became public with the launch of the Fiat 850.

== The launch ==
The "Simca Mille" (as the car is called in French) was inexpensive and, at the time of launch, quite modern, with a brand-new inline-four water-cooled "Poissy engine" of (at this stage) 944 cc. Production began on 27 July 1961, with the official unveiling taking place in the context of a high-profile publicity campaign at the Paris Motor Show on 10 October 1961. At the launch Pigozzi, for obvious reasons, placed great stress on the extent to which the new car marked a landmark achievement for an increasingly independent Simca, and the company's new Development Department at Poissy, while omitting to mention that the Simca 1000 was the product of close collaboration with the company's majority shareholder, Fiat.

Initially, cars could be ordered in one of three colours (red/rouge tison, egg-shell blue/bleu pervenche or off-white/gris-princesse). However, the show stand featured two additional body colours and the range of colours available to customers was soon expanded. The company's marketing strategy was characteristically imaginative, and having acquired a Paris taxi business in 1958, in November 1961 Simca replaced 50 of that company's Simca Ariane based taxis with 50 much smaller (but evidently spacious enough for the relatively short journeys normally undertaken by taxi) Simca 1000s: thus the stylish little car, often with iconic Paris landmarks in the background, quickly became a familiar sight on the capital's roads. Pictures of Simca 1000s working as Paris taxis turned up in the press. It was nevertheless made clear that this was not a permanent change and after a few months the red and black Simca 1000 taxis were removed from circulation and replaced with more conventionally sized taxis.

The Simca 1000 was also seen in a number of export markets, with left- or right-hand-drive. Already by June 1963 it had found its way to South Africa, where it was sold alongside Chryslers, Dodges, and Plymouths. In the United States, the 1000 sedan was on sale for the 1963 model year, with the Coupé following in 1965.

== The car ==
Use of the RR layout was a first for Simca, although leading auto-makers in France and Germany had been applying it to mainstream small cars for more than a decade. In addition to the rear engine, the fuel tank of the Simca 1000 was located in the rear, behind the rear passenger seat. This gave the car a 35/65 front/rear weight distribution, with an extremely light and nimble front end and a responsive oversteer on curvy roads.

The interior was considered "surprisingly" spacious for this class of car, with plenty of space for four, although the luggage locker under the front hood/bonnet offered only limited space: unlike the similarly configured competitor Renault Dauphine and Renault 8 (and Simca's own prototypes for the Simca 1000) which stowed their spare wheels flat underneath the front luggage locker, the Simca 1000 had its spare wheel stowed vertically in the front luggage compartment, just behind the front bumper. The driver enjoyed an excellent view out: the speedometer pod and minor controls positioned ahead of the driver were basic, although the manufacturer stressed that the glass covering the speedometer was angled to minimize reflections.

== Evolution ==
Over the course of time, the 1000 (whose name was pronounced "mille" in French) was available in a number of versions featuring different equipment levels and variations of the original Type 315 engine. In 1963 the poverty spec Simca 900 was released. In spite of the name change, it also had the 944 cc engine with 36 PS (26 kW), but the 1000 now gained three more horsepower. In 1966 only the 900C was available, equipped with the more powerful iteration of the 315. In October 1968 the low cost Simca 4 CV (marketed in France as the Sim'4) appeared, powered by a 777 cc unit providing 31 PS (23 kW) (DIN), and very competitively priced. The bare bones Sim'4 used the hubcaps from the earlier generation while receiving smaller bumper overriders without rubber inserts; a "4CV" badge on the right rear fender also helped identify the model. Twelve months after introduction, power was increased somewhat, to 33 PS (24 kW). Being very cheap in the second-hand market, the Sim'4 was a perfect starting point for creating Simca Rallye replicas and very few remain in original condition.

The 1000 engine was updated simultaneously with the 4CV model's upgrade in October 1968 and was now called the type 349. At the top end of the range, the 1118 cc unit from the larger Simca 1100 was added for the 1969 model year (the Simca 1000 was marketed in the US as Simca 1118). The engine was again expanded to 1294cc in 1971 and fitted to 1000 in 1972.

Apart from the standard manual transmission, some versions could be fitted with a three-speed semiautomatic developed by Ferodo. The car underwent a light facelift first shown at the 1968 Paris Motor Show (for the 1969 model year): new hubcaps, redesigned bumpers, bigger headlamps, and square taillights.

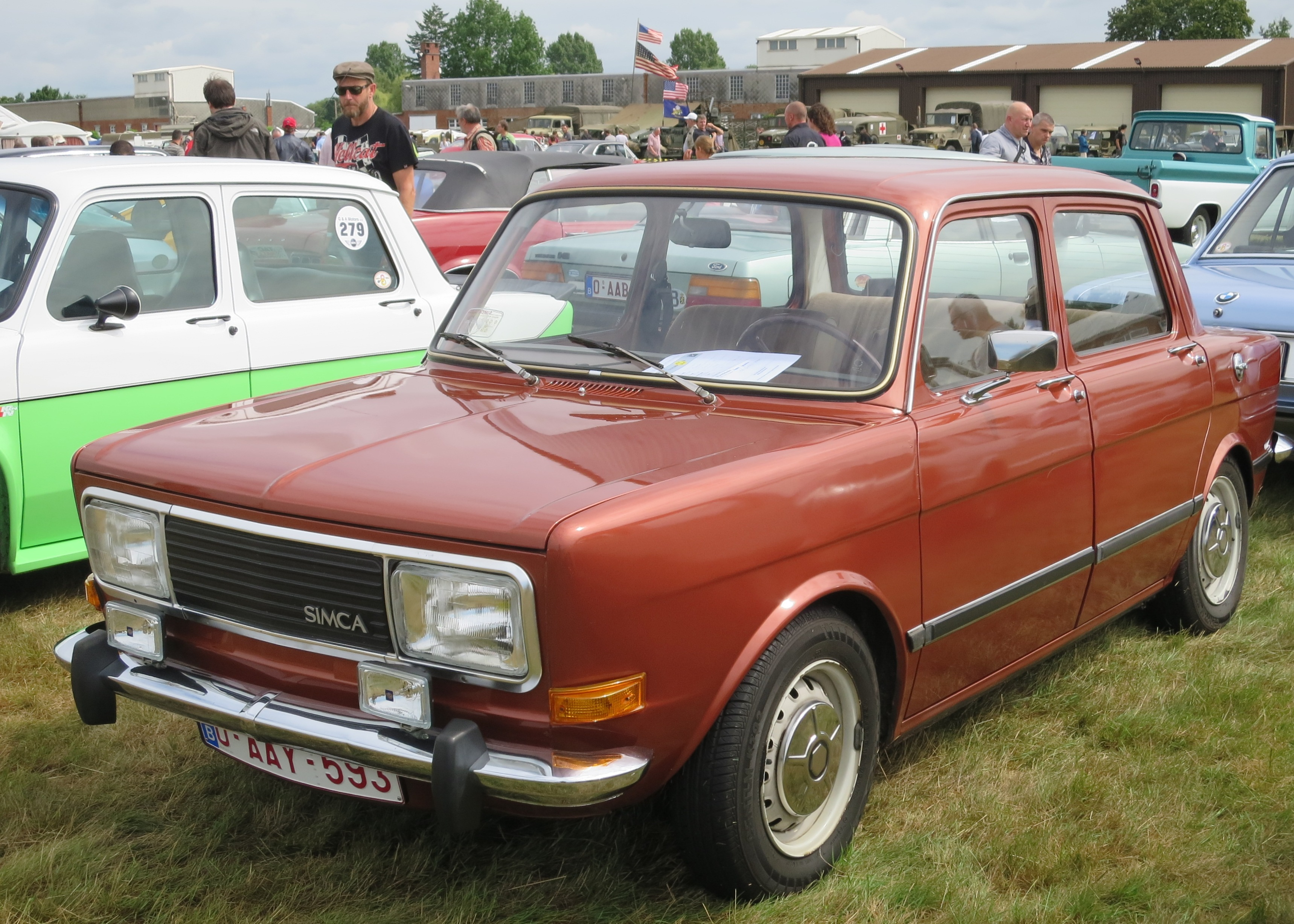
Last version of the Simca 1000, the 1006

The high-specification versions were offered in the British market with a walnut dashboard decor. In 1977, the model was revised for the last time, gaining the new names of 1005/1006 (depending on the specifications), to put it in line with the newer Simca 1307 and its derivatives. It can be recognized by the rectangular headlights. Production stopped in 1978 without a direct replacement.

=== Spain ===
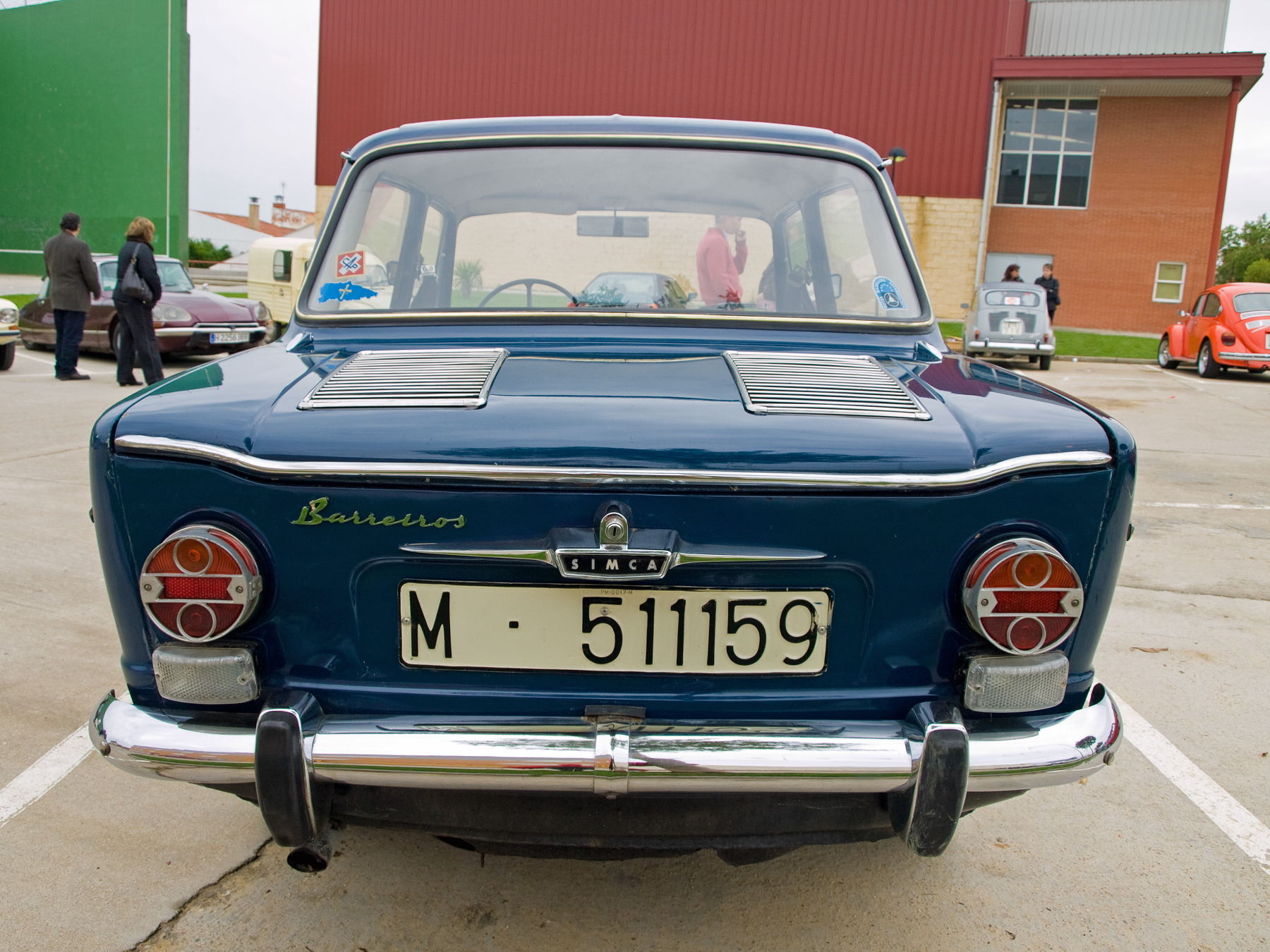
1966–1968 Simca 1000 by Barreiros

In Spain, the Simca 1000 was built by Barreiros Diesel from late 1965. In 1970 this company changed names to "Chrysler España, S. A."; early cars feature a chrome "Barreiros" script. The low-specification 844 cc version was sold in Spain only, a market where cars with engines of less than 850 cc received a sizable tax break, as the Simca 900. These originally had 38 PS (28 kW). After a hiatus, the 900 returned in 1970 and was then updated in the form of the twin-carb 900 Special of 1973; this model has 43 PS (32 kW).

A special Spanish-market model introduced in April 1970 was the 61 PS (45 kW) DIN 1000 GT, which had a milder version of the 1204 cc engine as found in the 1200 Coupé. This engine also powered the more luxurious 1000 Special (from 1972). In the spring of 1971 this received twin carburators and became the "1000 Rallye GT", with power increased to 74 PS (54 kW) SAE. It had twin black stripes at the very rear and other sporting equipment. This version was discontinued in 1972, essentially being replaced by the 1000 Special. The more powerful French-built Simca 1000 Rallye models were not available in the Spanish market, but in February 1976 the Spanish-built Simca 1000 Rallye appeared. This has a single carburated version of the 1294 cc engine with 63 PS (46 kW), making it considerably less powerful than its French contemporaries. It also did not benefit from disc brakes all around. Its appearance was similar to the French built Rallye 2, with many black stripes and a black front bonnet. As with the rest of the 1000 range, the Spanish Rallye received a facelift with large, rectangular headlamps in September 1976.

Spanish production ended in May 1977. Spanish-built CKD kits were also shipped to Colombia, where Chrysler Colmotores built the car from 1969 until 1977. The 1000 also served as a taxi in Colombia.

The model was immortalised by the festive pop-rock Spanish band Los Inhumanos, whose song titled "It's so difficult to make love in a Simca 1000" from their 1988 LP "30 hombres solos" is still heard and sung in bars across the country. The phrase highlights the car's small size and cramped interior, which would make any intimate activity a challenge due to limited space.

== Commercial ==
The Simca 1000 became a popular car in France, and to some extent also in export markets. During 1962, its first full year of production, the manufacturer produced 154,282. The achievement was the more impressive because Simca and its dealers had no recent experience of selling small cars, so apart from first time buyers and customers trading down, all the little car's buyers had to be lured away from competitor manufacturers. As a comparison, France's top seller for 1962 in this class was the Renault Dauphine which had been able to build on more than a decade of class leading sales by the Renault 4CV. Renault produced (including the sporty Ondine versions) 266,767 Dauphines in 1962. The other major competitor in this segment was Citroën whose Ami model managed 85,358 units in 1962 which for the Ami, as for the little Simca, was the first full year of production. Throughout the 1960s and early 1970s the Simca 1000 would continue to appear well up the rankings in the French sales charts, with annual sales remaining above 100,000 without a break until 1974. In its 17 years of production, almost 2 million were sold.

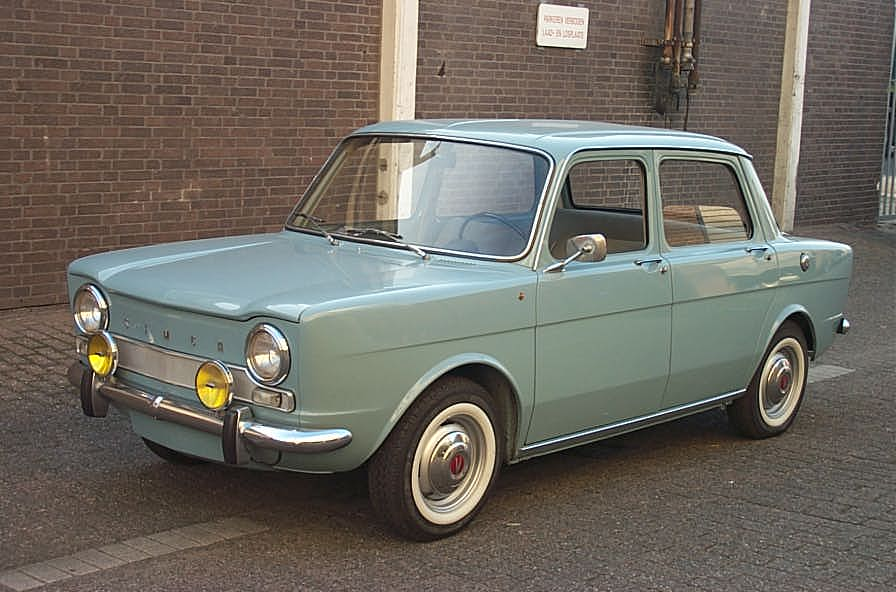
1963 Simca 1000

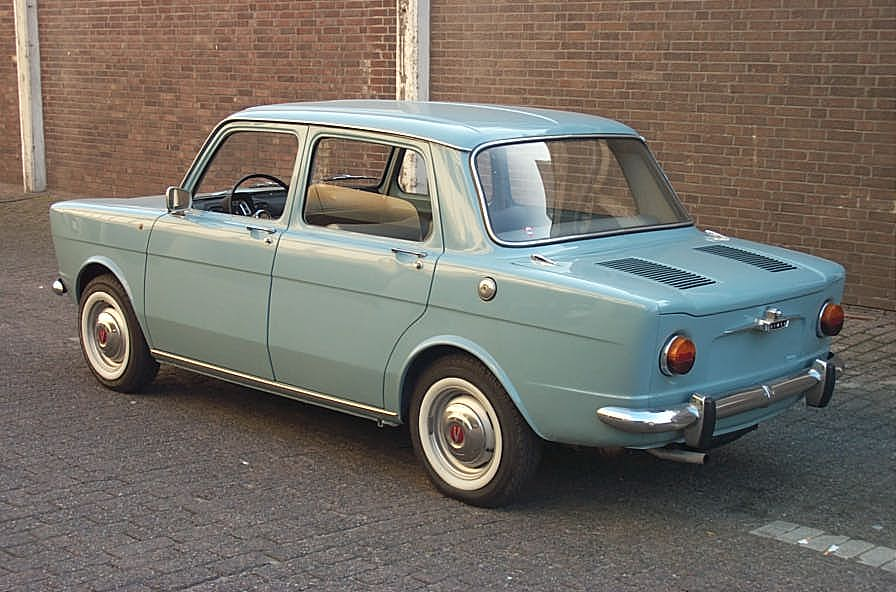
1963 Simca 1000 - rear view

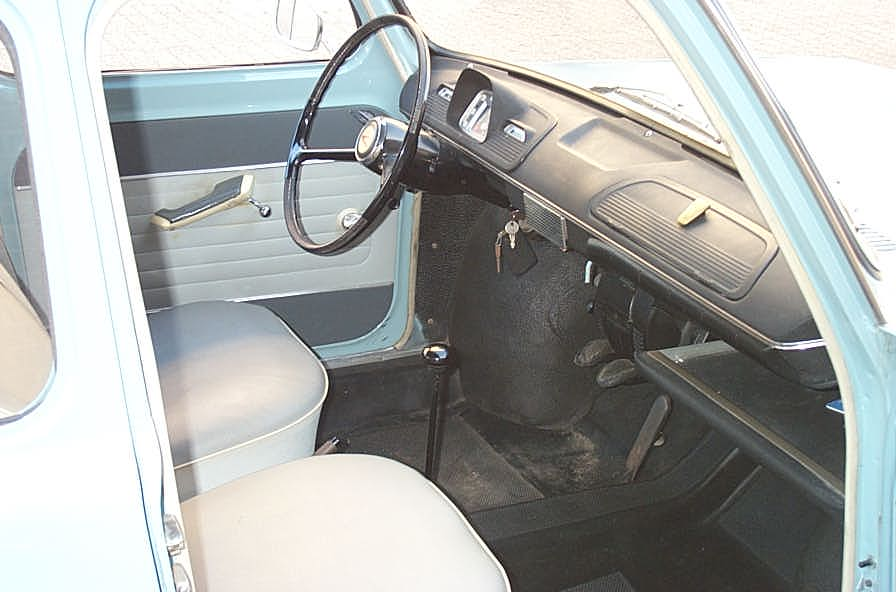
1963 Simca 1000 - interior

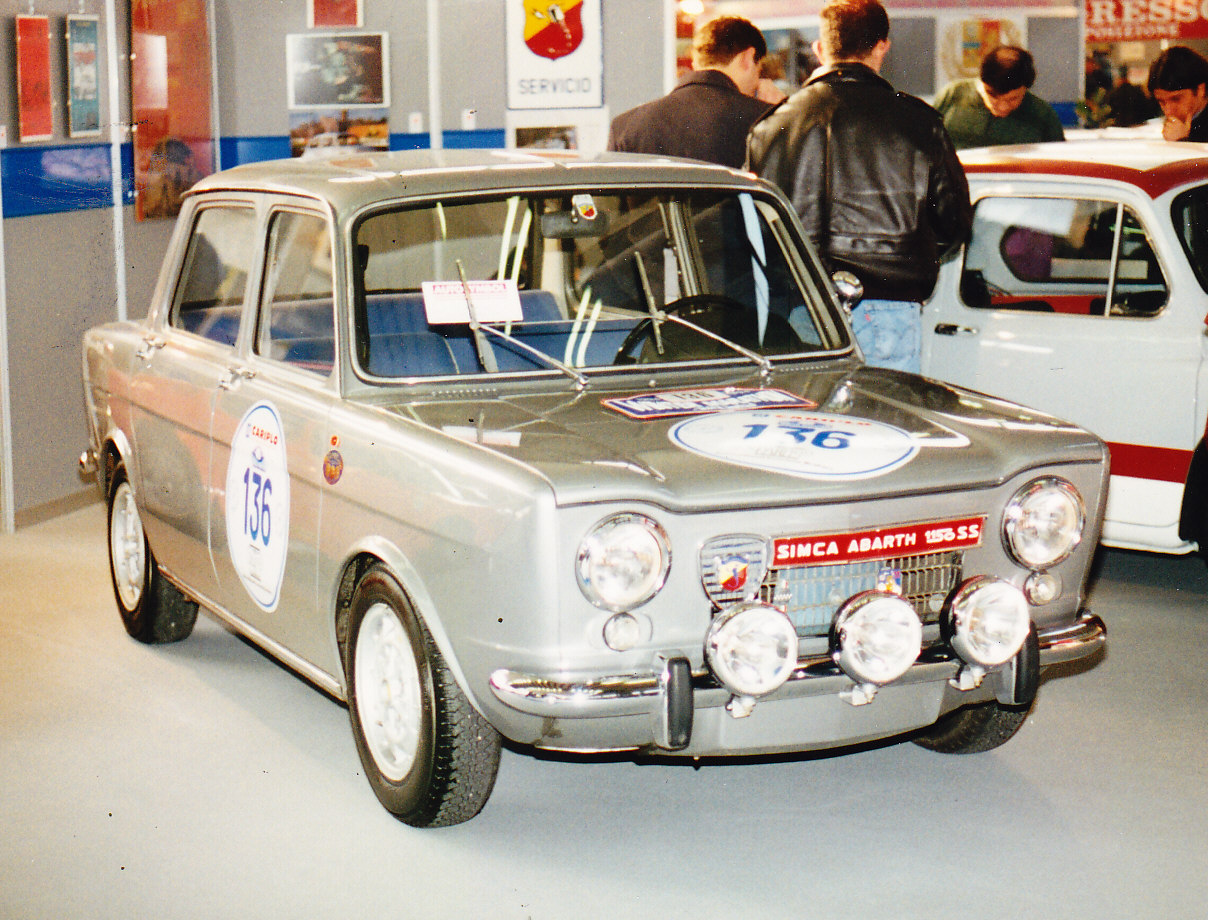
Abarth-Simca 1150 SS

== The Simca-Abarth (1964–1966) and Simca 1000 Rallye ==
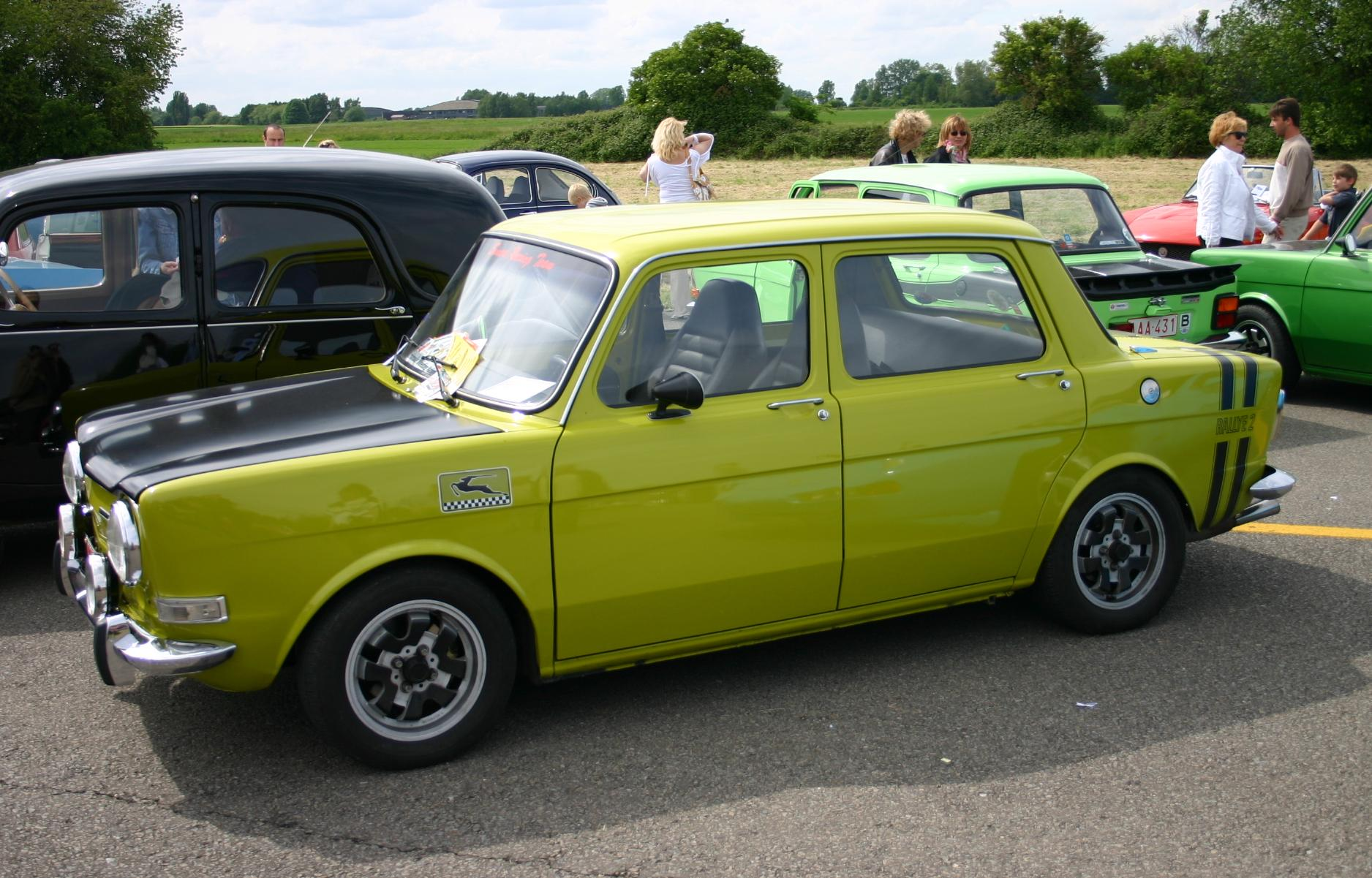
Simca 1000 Rallye 2

In the model's early years, the Italian tuner Abarth was offering modified versions of the 1000, and later Simca itself began offering a "Rallye" version, which helped boost the model's popularity in the motorsport community. The Rallye was followed by the Rallye 1, the Rallye 2 and the Rallye 3.

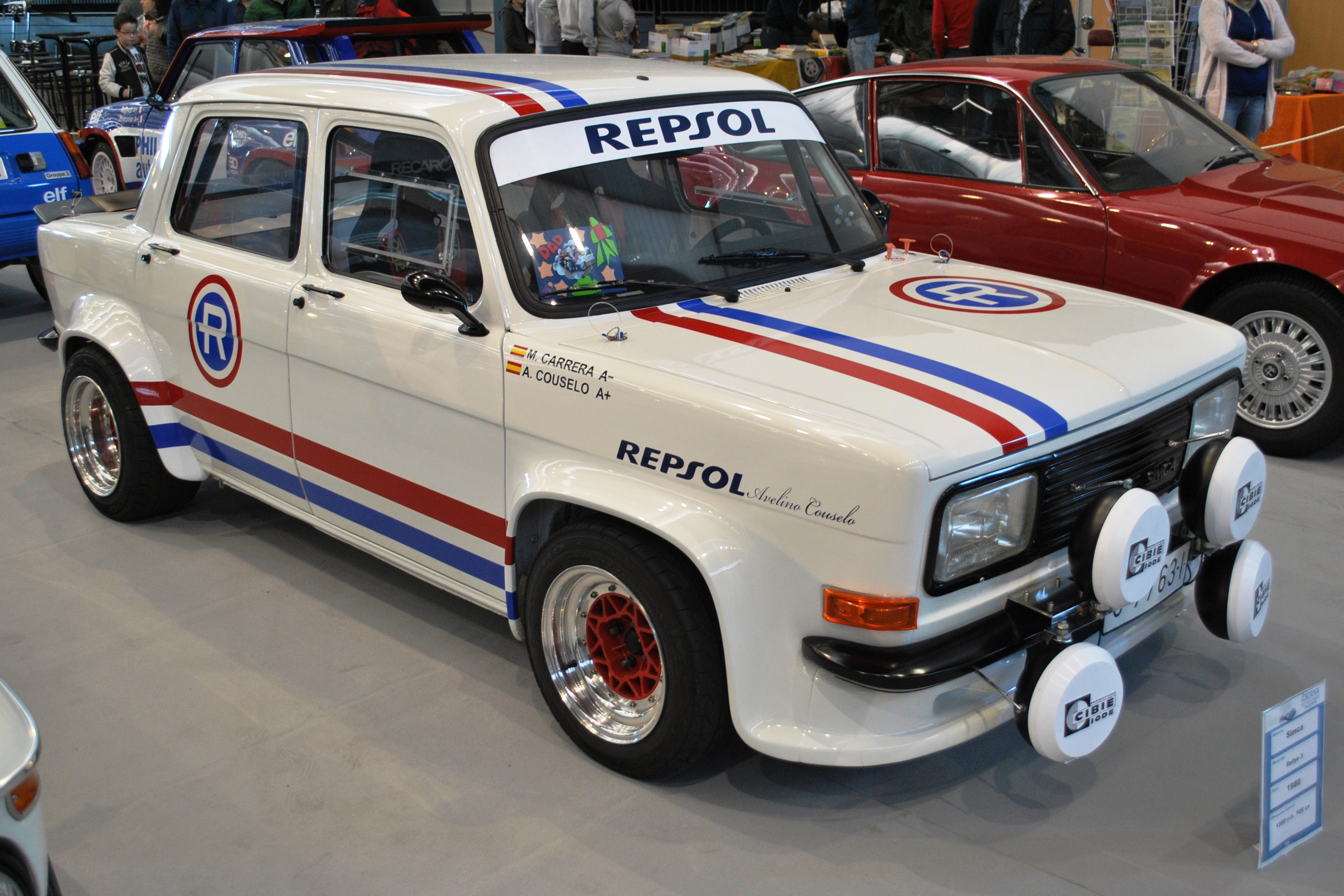
1980 Simca Rallye 3 – 1.3 l, 105 hp

- Simca-Abarth 1150 - 1137 cc - 55 PS (40 kW; 54 hp) at 5600 rpm - disk brakes - 11000 F
- Simca-Abarth 1150 S - 1137 cc - 58 PS (43 kW; 57 hp) at 5600 rpm - disk brakes
- Simca-Abarth 1150 SS - 1137 cc - 65 PS (48 kW; 64 hp) at 5600 rpm - disk brakes - Option : six speed gear box

The swan song of the Simca 1000 in this series was the Simca 1000 Rallye 3, with a 103 PS (76 kW) engine. Only 1,000 were produced during the last year of production of the Simca 1000, 1978.

Simca 1000 History (types, engines, prices and production volumes by year)
Year	Models	Engines	Price (in F)	Production
1962	Simca 1000	944 cc 45 PS (33 kW)	6490 F	1961 : 9670; 1962 : 154 282
1963	Simca 900; Simca 1000	944 cc 45 PS (33 kW); 944 cc 50 PS (37 kW)	5950 F 6490 F	168 654
1964	Simca 900; Simca 900 C Simca 1000; Simca 1000 GL	944 cc 45 PS (33 kW); 944 cc 45 PS (33 kW); 944 cc 50 PS (37 kW); 944 cc 52 PS (38 kW)	5950 F 6250 F 6450 F 6750 F	113 818
1965	Simca 900; Simca 1000; Simca 1000 GL; Simca 1000 GLS	944 cc 45 PS (33 kW); 944 cc 50 PS (37 kW); 944 cc 52 PS (38 kW); 944 cc 52 PS (38 kW)		118 655
1966	Simca 1000 L Simca 1000 LS; Simca 1000 GL; Simca 1000 GLS; Simca 1000 GLA	944 cc 50 PS (37 kW); 944 cc 50 PS (37 kW); 944 cc 52 PS (38 kW); 944 cc 52 PS (38 kW); 944 cc 54 PS (40 kW)	6200 F 6600 F 6900 F 7350 F 7350 F	174 068
1967	Simca 1000 Commerciale; Simca 1000 L Simca 1000 LS; Simca 1000 GL; Simca 1000 GLS; Simca 1000 GLA	944 cc 50 PS (37 kW); 944 cc 50 PS (37 kW); 944 cc 50 PS (37 kW); 944 cc 52 PS (38 kW); 944 cc 52 PS (38 kW); 944 cc 54 PS (40 kW)	6115 F 6200 F 6600 F 6900 F 7350 F 7350 F	115 397
1968	Simca 1000 Commerciale; Simca 1000 L Simca 1000 LS; Simca 1000 GL; Simca 1000 GLS; Simca 1000 GLA	944 cc 50 PS (37 kW); 944 cc 50 PS (37 kW); 944 cc 50 PS (37 kW); 944 cc 52 PS (38 kW); 944 cc 52 PS (38 kW); 944 cc 54 PS (40 kW)	6115 F 6200 F 6600 F 6900 F 7350 F 7350 F	114 427
1969	Sim'4; Simca 1000; Simca 1000 Spécial	777 cc 31 PS (23 kW); 944 cc 42 PS (31 kW); 1118 cc 50 PS (37 kW)	6595 F 7695 F 8995 F	146 321
1970	Sim'4; Simca 1000; Simca 1000 Spécial; Simca 1000 Rallye	777 cc 33 PS (24 kW); 944 cc 44 PS (32 kW); 1118 cc 53 PS (39 kW); 1118 cc 53 PS (39 kW)	7190 F 8140 F 9515 F 8695 F	133 540
1971	Sim'4; Simca 1000 LS; Simca 1000 GL; Simca 1000 Spécial; Simca 1000 Rallye	777 cc 33 PS (24 kW); 944 cc 44 PS (32 kW); 944 cc 44 PS (32 kW); 1118 cc 53 PS (39 kW); 1118 cc 53 PS (39 kW)	7695 F 7995 F 8745 F 9995 F 8995 F	122 933
1972	Sim'4; Simca 1000 LS; Simca 1000 GLS; Simca 1000 Spécial; Simca 1000 Rallye 1	777 cc 33 PS (24 kW); 944 cc 44 PS (32 kW); 1118 cc 53 PS (39 kW); 1294 cc 60 PS (44 kW); 1294 cc 60 PS (44 kW)		131 195
1973	Sim'4; Simca 1000 LS; Simca 1000 GLS; Simca 1000 Spécial; Simca 1000 Rallye 1 Simca 1000 Rallye 2	777 cc 33 PS (24 kW); 944 cc 44 PS (32 kW); 1118 cc 53 PS (39 kW); 1294 cc 60 PS (44 kW); 1294 cc 60 PS (44 kW); 1294 cc 82 PS (60 kW)		136 193
1974	Simca 1000 LS; Simca 1000 GLE; Simca 1000 GLS 6CV; Simca 1000 GLS 5CV Ferodo; Simca 1000 Spécial; Simca 1000 Rallye 1 Simca 1000 Rallye 2	944 cc 44 PS (32 kW); 944 cc 44 PS (32 kW); 1118 cc 53 PS (39 kW); 944 cc 44 PS (32 kW); 1294 cc 60 PS (44 kW); 1294 cc 60 PS (44 kW); 1294 cc 82 PS (60 kW)	9550 F 10500 F 10250 F 10850 F 10950 F 10850 F 13850 F	95 604
1975	Simca 1000 LS; Simca 1000 GLE; Simca 1000 GLS; Simca 1000 Spécial; Simca 1000 Rallye 1 Simca 1000 Rallye 2	944 cc 44 PS (32 kW); 944 cc 44 PS (32 kW); 1118 cc 53 PS (39 kW); 1294 cc 60 PS (44 kW); 1294 cc 60 PS (44 kW); 1294 cc 82 PS (60 kW)		71 346
1976	Simca 1000 LS; Simca 1000 GLE; Simca 1000 GLS; Simca 1000 Spécial; Simca 1000 SR 6CV; Simca 1000 SR 7CV; Simca 1000 Rallye 1 Simca 1000 Rallye 2	944 cc 44 PS (32 kW); 944 cc 44 PS (32 kW); 944 cc 44 PS (32 kW); 1118 cc 53 PS (39 kW); 1118 cc 53 PS (39 kW); 1294 cc 60 PS (44 kW); 1294 cc 60 PS (44 kW); 1294 cc 82 PS (60 kW)		
1977	Simca 1005 LS; Simca 1006 GLS; Simca 1000 Rallye 1 Simca 1000 Rallye 2	944 cc 40 PS (29 kW); 1118 cc 55 PS (40 kW); 1294 cc 60 PS (44 kW); 1294 cc 86 PS (63 kW)	15100 F 17420 F 17250 F 22625 F	49 190
1978	Simca 1005 LS; Simca 1006 GLS; Simca 1000 Rallye 1 Simca 1000 Rallye 2 Simca 1000 Rallye 3	944 cc 40 PS (29 kW); 1118 cc 55 PS (40 kW); 1294 cc 60 PS (44 kW); 1294 cc 86 PS (63 kW); 1294 cc 103 PS (76 kW)	23800 F 29700 F	12 893
