= Fiat Abarth OT 1300 =

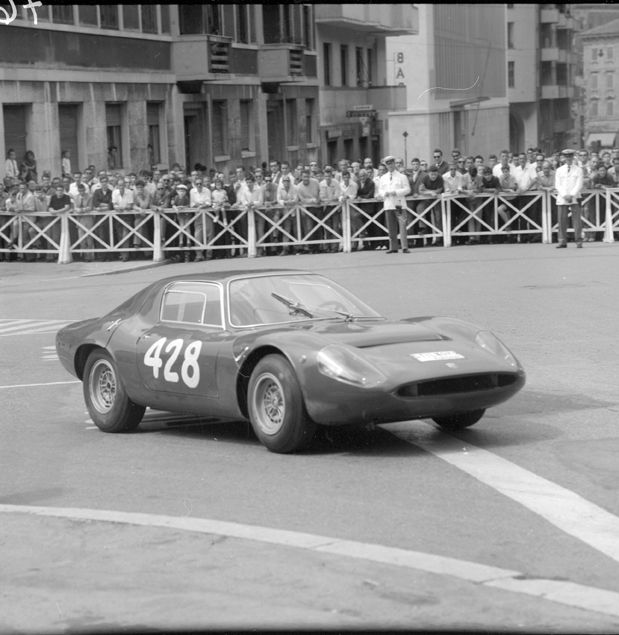
- Category: Group 4 sports car
- Designer: Mario Colucci
- Production: 1965–1968

Technical specifications
- Chassis: Tubular chassis
- Length: 3,830 mm (150.8 in)
- Width: 1,620 mm (63.8 in)
- Height: 1,040 mm (40.9 in)
- Axle track: 1,296 mm (51.0 in) (Front); 1,340 mm (52.8 in) (Rear)
- Wheelbase: 2,015 mm (79.3 in)
- Engine: I4 1289 cc 1946 cc FR Layout Longitudinally mounted
- Transmission: 5-speed manual
- Power: 110 kW (150 PS) @ 8,800 rpm 180 N⋅m (133 lb⋅ft) @ 4,600 rpm
- Weight: 655 kg (1,444 lb)

Competition history
- Notable drivers: Helmut Krause; Hans-Dieter Dechent; Ernst Furtmayr; Erich Bitter; Johannes Ortner; Manfred Abels; Werner Buls; Siegfried Dau; Reinhold Joest; Ralf Walter; Klaus Brand; Toine Hezemans
Entries	Races	Wins	Podiums	Poles
228	111	12 outright, 31 class wins	28	1

The Fiat Abarth OT 1300 was a successful Group 4 Sports prototype built by Abarth between 1965 and 1968. There was also a two-litre model developed from this, called the OT 2000.

== Design ==
The OT 1300 has a fibreglass body over a bespoke tubular frame, although especially the rear suspension layout and geometry was derived from the Fiat designs which Abarth had based their previous GT cars on. Derived from the open-topped Abarth OT 1600 Sport Spider (tipo 135/A), an open-topped prototype racer completed in 1965, the OT 1300 had a very similar front end and lower half. The new model entered production in May 1965 and was built in its initial form (Series I) until March of 1966. After these first 50 cars had (reportedly) been finished, the car received homologation for Group 4 racing; until then, it had to compete against faster Sports Prototypes. As the OT remained popular and competitive, Abarth revised the design with a Series II, with numerous improvements. These cars were fitted with a bulbous plexiglass rear windshield cover, held over the original, vertical rear pane and flying buttresses with nine removable bolts. The chassis was also widened, as was the tread. The front end was also revised, with a flatter appearance and a grille in the shape of a smile. The molds for the original design had been thrown together in a hurry, with the front fender being 6–7 cm (2.4–2.8 in) wider on one side than the other; this was rectified with the Series II.

One of the OT's most distinct features was the "Periscope" (Periscopio); as the cabin was much too hot for endurance racing, Abarth experimented with various vent layouts and eventually settled on this, off-center, periscope-style vent to provide cool air for the driver. While the periscope was a clear improvement, the rear window cover made the car less stable at speed and also made the cabin hotter than before, so most owners removed it or installed Series I rear clamshell panels. The oversquare, in-house engine displaces 1,289 cc (1.3 L), from a bore and stroke of 86 mm × 55.5 mm (3.39 in × 2.19 in). The first series develops a claimed 147 hp (108 kW) at 8,800 rpm; power for the second series increased marginally, to 157 hp (115 kW) at the same engine speed.

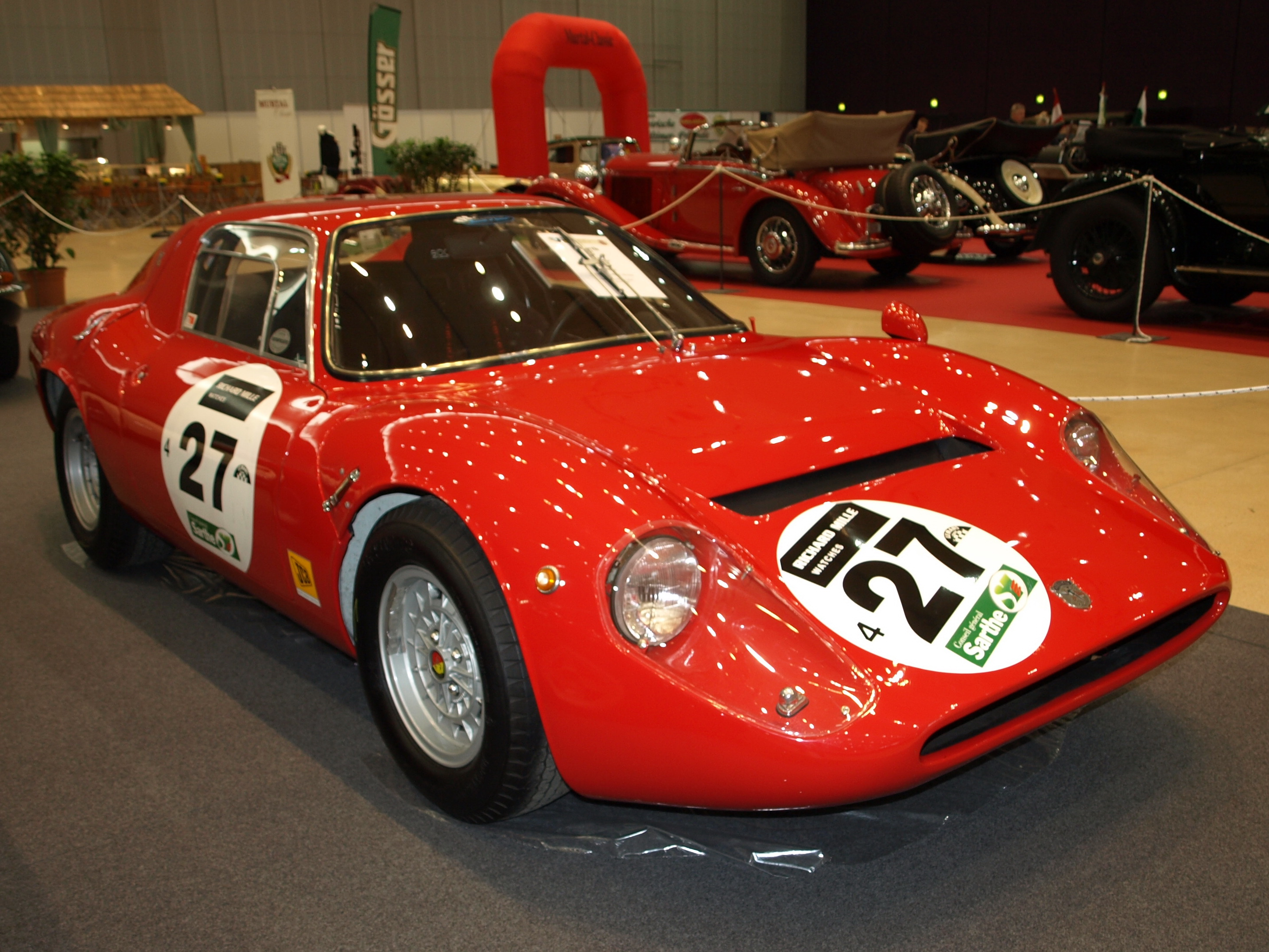
1966 Abarth OT 1300 Series I on display

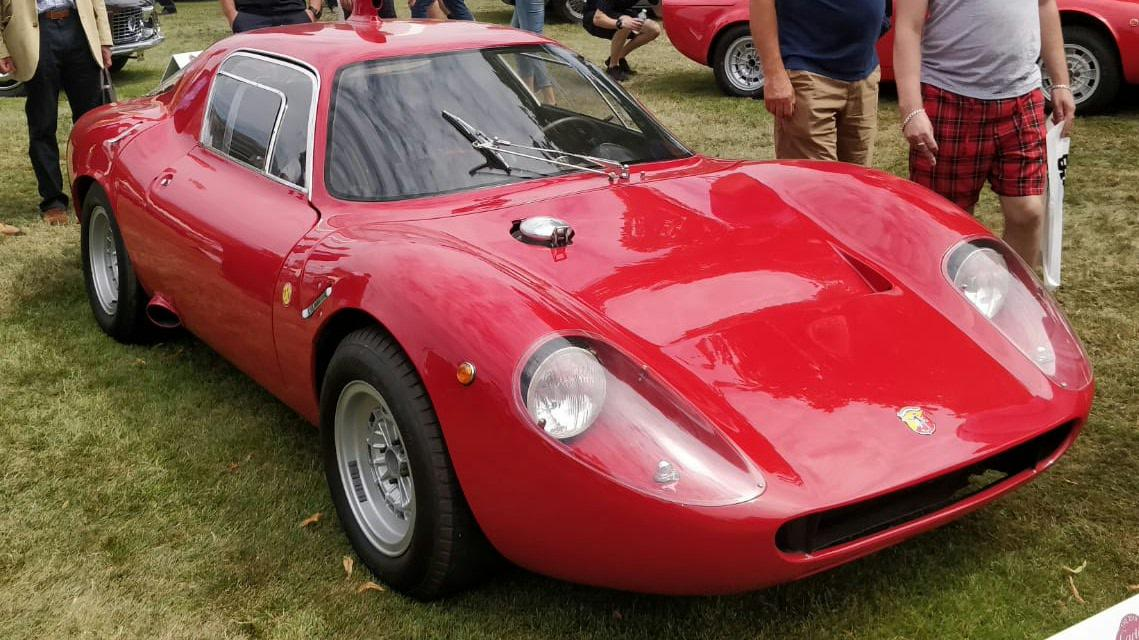
1965 Abarth OT 1300 'Periscopio'

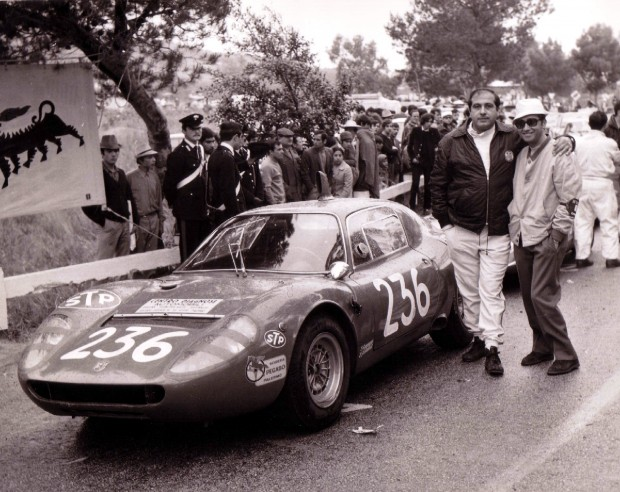
Abarth OT 1300 at the 1970 Targa Florio

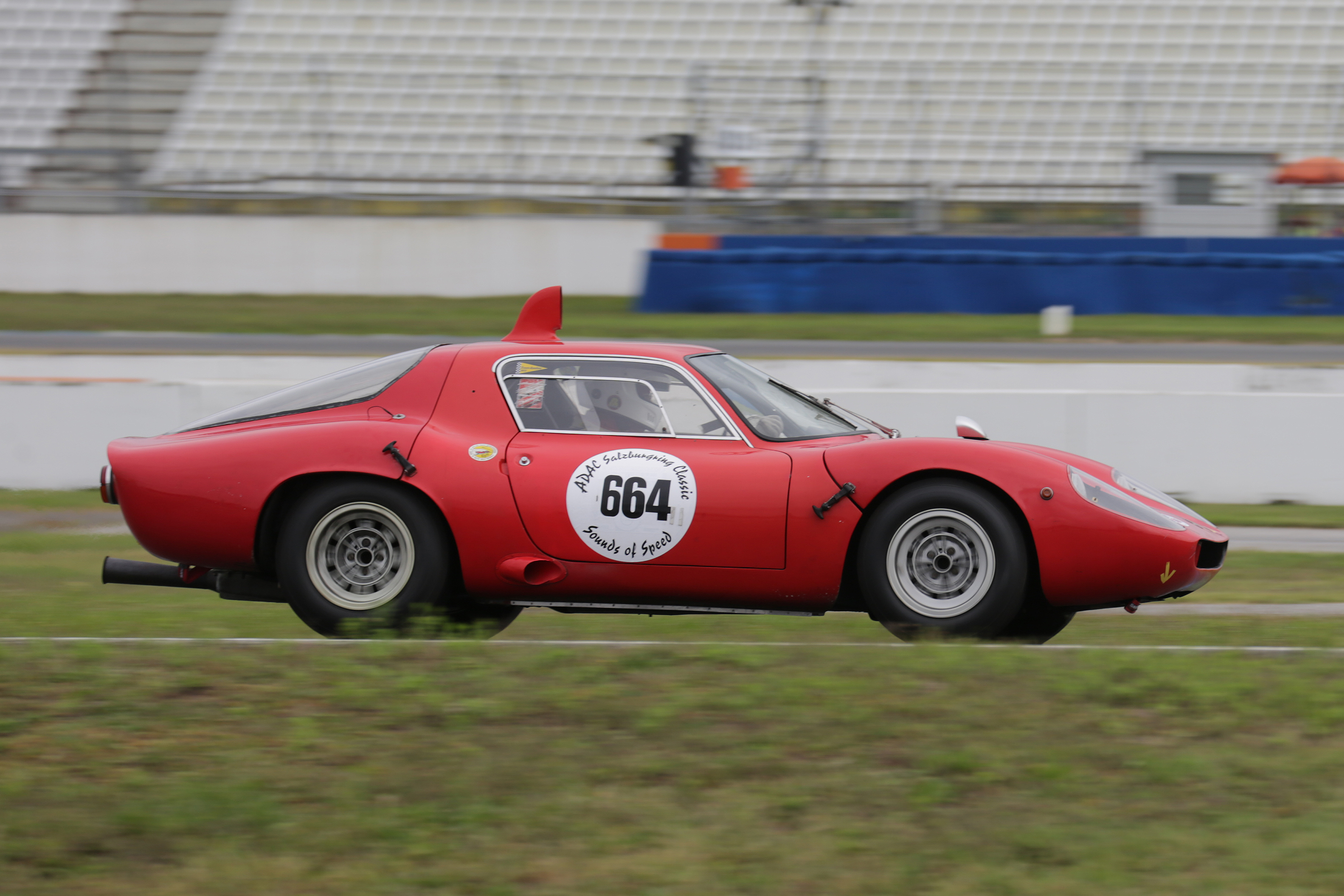
A 1968 Abarth OT 1300 'Periscopio' competing at a historic race

== Racing History ==
=== Race Victories ===
- 1966 Nürburgring 500 km
- 1967 Hockenheim Grand Prix

=== Class Victories ===
- 1966 Monza 1000 km
- 1966 Nürburgring 1000 km
- 1966 Mugello Grand Prix
- 1966 Coppa Citta di Enna
- 1966 Hockenheim Grand Prix
- 1966 500 km Zeltweg
- 1967 Mugello Grand Prix
- 1967 Coppa Citta di Enna
- 1967 500 km Zeltweg
- 1967 Ollon-Villars Hillclimb
- 1967 Nürburgring 500 km

== OT 2000 ==
Abarth also developed a 2-litre derivative called the OT 2000, introduced in 1966 and using largely identical bodywork and with the same model code of 137C. This engine was Abarth's own development, with twin overhead camshafts and five main bearings. With a 10.5:1 compression ratio and double Weber 50DCO3 carburettors, it displaces 1.9 litres (1,946 cc) from a bore and stroke of 88 mm × 80 mm (3.5 in × 3.1 in). Maximum power was 208 PS (153 kW) at 7,600 rpm; enough for a top speed of 270 km/h (168 mph) - albeit this depended on the gearing. Around 20 examples were built of this, the last OT. Another source states that only three examples of the OT 2000 were built, with the first one delivered new to the Ford family in 1966.

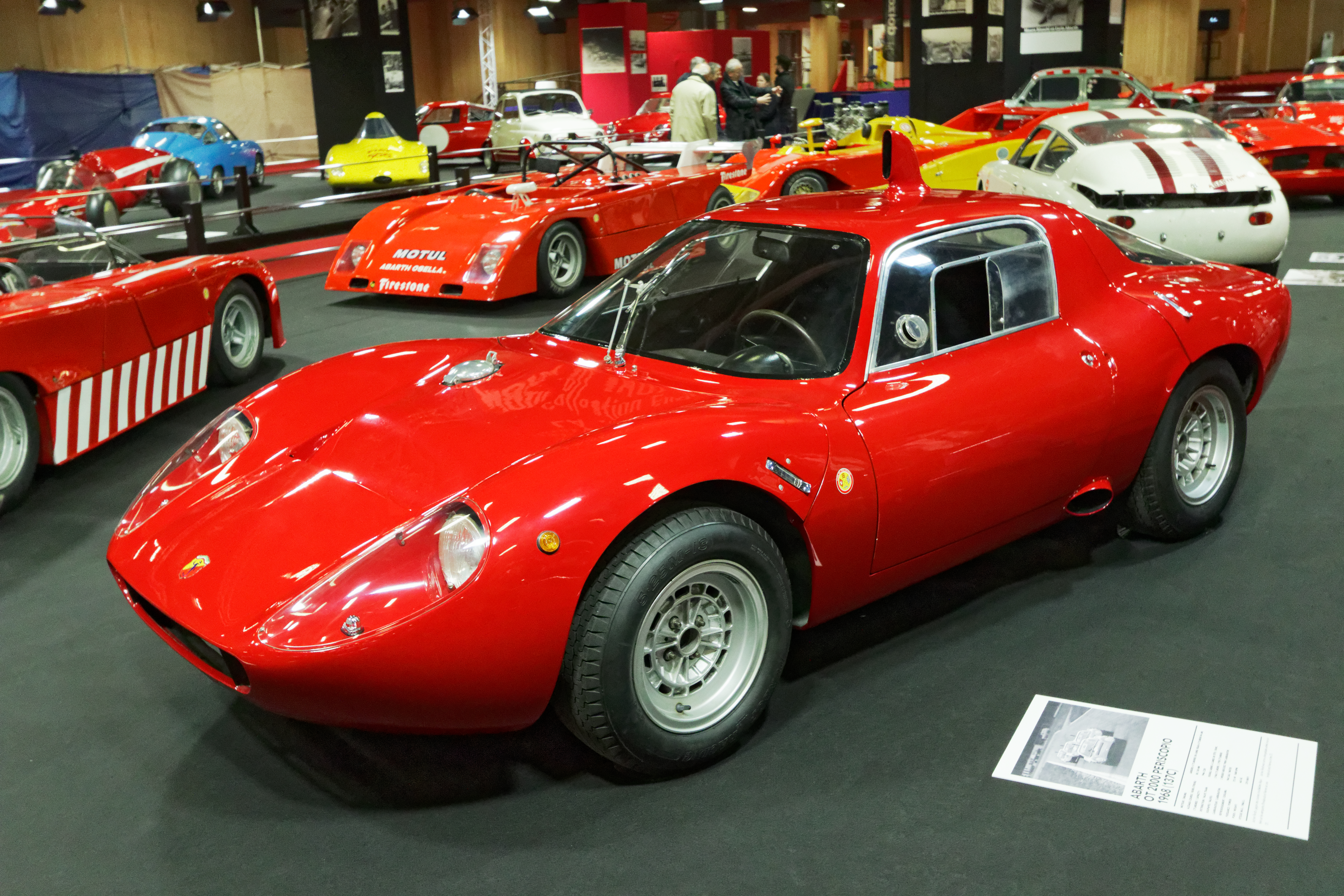
Abarth OT 2000 Periscopo

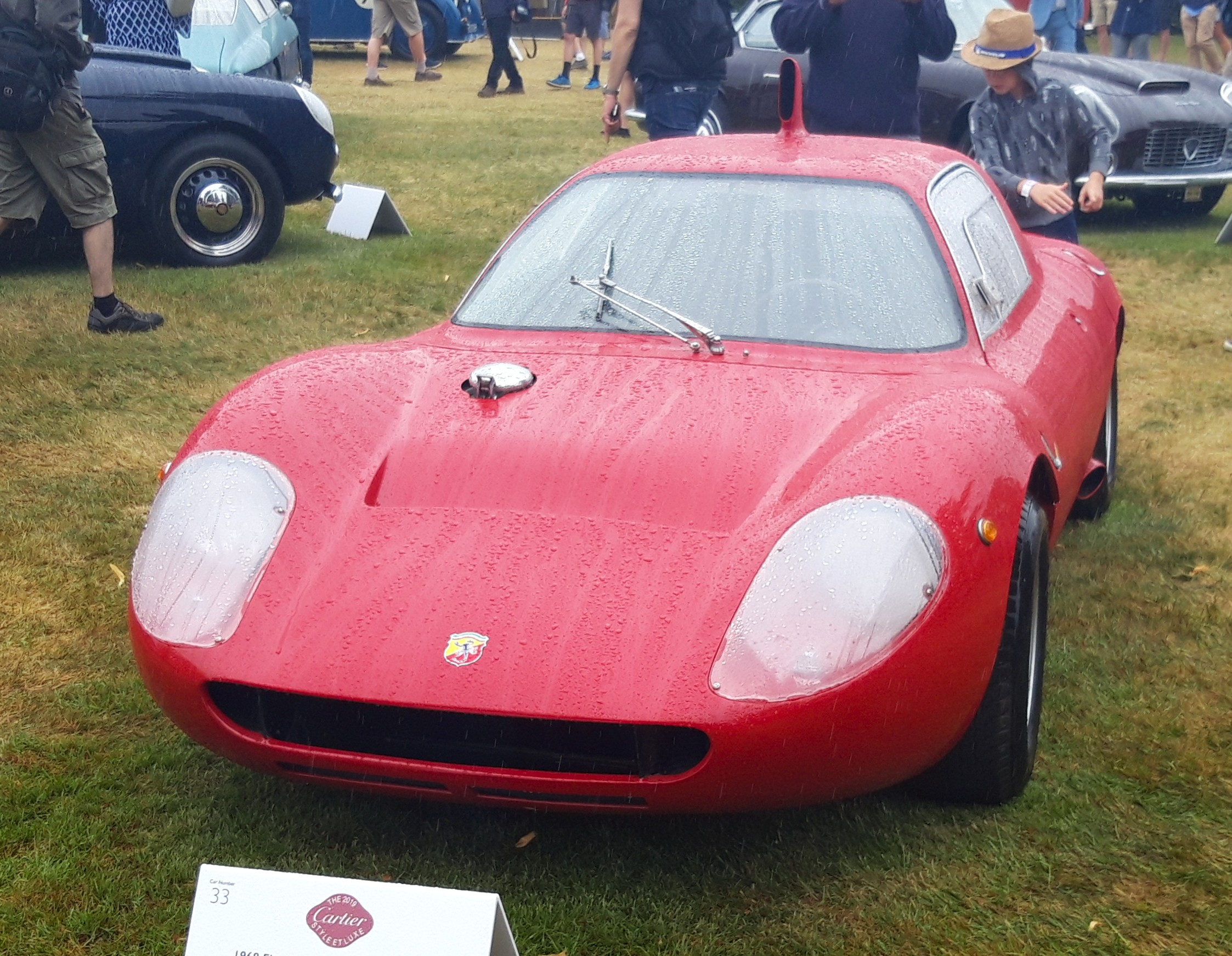
Abarth OT 2000 Periscopo

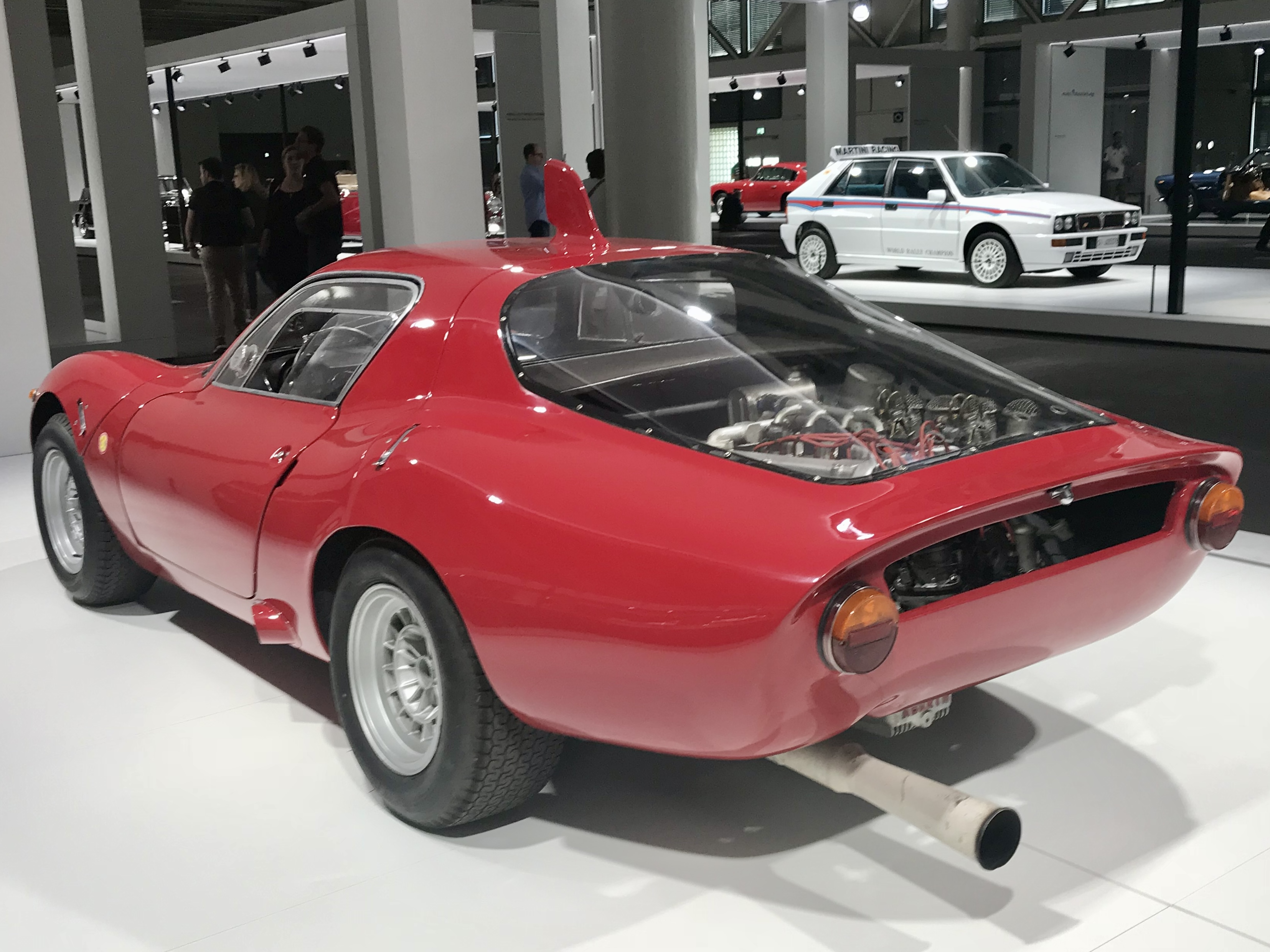
Rear view
