= Centura =

Centura may refer to:

- Chrysler Centura, a midsize car which was produced by Chrysler Australia between 1975 and 1978
- Centura Bank, a bank headquartered in Rocky Mount, North Carolina until 2001, when Royal Bank of Canada acquired the company and changed its name to RBC Centura
- Centura Software, a former name of Gupta Technologies
- Beltways around Romanian cities, such as Centura București around the capital Bucharest (from Romanian: centura = belt)
