= Chrysler 180 =

Car model built by Chrysler

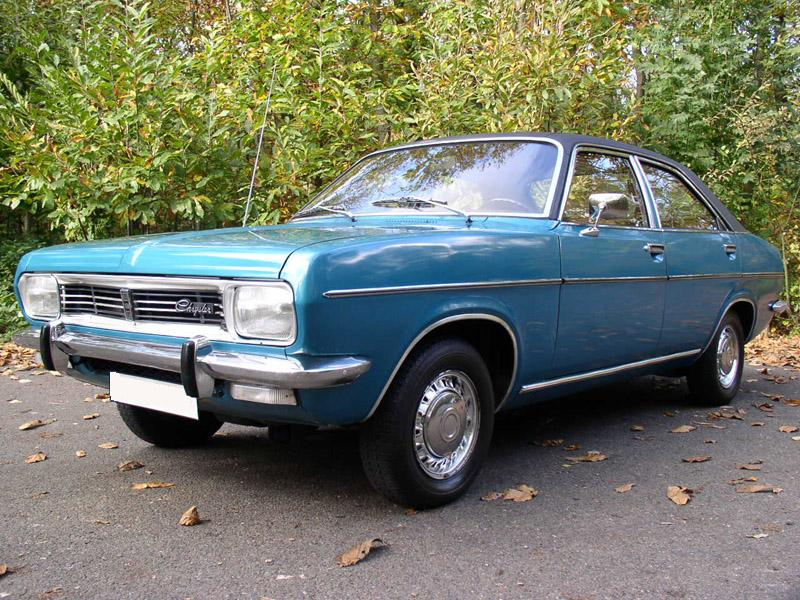
- Chrysler 160

Overview
- Manufacturer: Chrysler Europe
- Also called: Chrysler 160/180/2 litre; Chrysler-Simca 1609/1610/2 litres; Talbot 180; Talbot 1610/2 litres; Talbot Simca 2 Litres
- Production: 1970–1982
- Assembly: France: Poissy (Poissy plant: 1970–1975); Spain: Villaverde, Madrid (Barreiros)
- Designer: Roy Axe; Curt Gwinn

Body and chassis
- Class: Executive car
- Body style: 4-door saloon
- Layout: FR layout
- Related: Chrysler Centura

Powertrain
- Engine: 1.6 L Type 180 I4; 1.8 L Type 180 I4; 2.0 L Type 180 I4; 1.9 L Barreiros diesel I4; 2.0 L Barreiros diesel I4
- Transmission: 4-speed manual 3-speed automatic

Dimensions
- Wheelbase: 2,667 mm (105.0 in)
- Length: 4,460–4,530 mm (175.6–178.3 in)
- Width: 1,730 mm (68.1 in)
- Height: 1,430 mm (56.3 in)

Chronology
- Predecessor: Simca Vedette; Humber Hawk
- Successor: Talbot Tagora

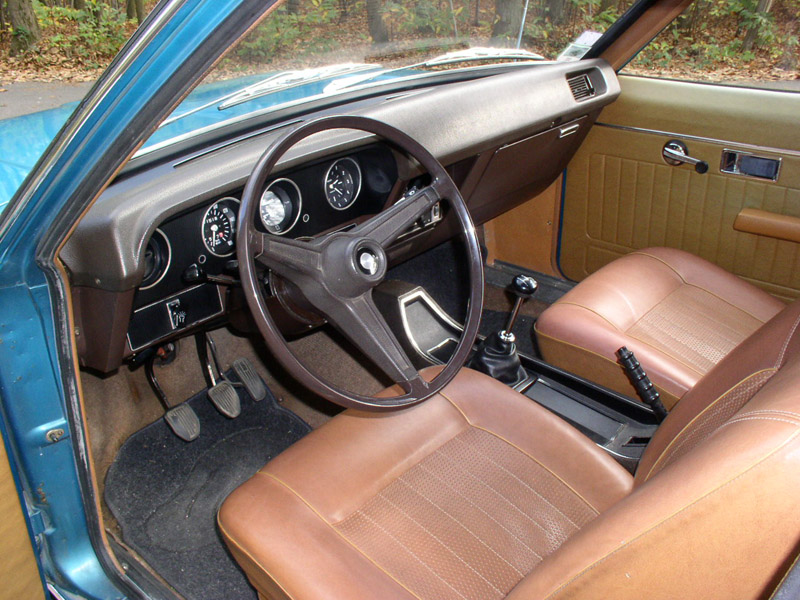
Interior of a Chrysler 160 fitted with manual transmission

The Chrysler 180 was the base name for a series of executive cars produced by Chrysler Europe. Resulting from joining the development efforts of Rootes Group and Simca, the car was produced from 1970 to 1975 in Poissy, France, and later in Chrysler's subsidiary Barreiros' factory in Spain. The Chrysler 180 was also the base for the medium-sized model built by Chrysler Australia, the Chrysler Centura.

Depending on the engine, the cars were marketed as Chrysler 160/180/2 litre, and since 1977 in France and rest of continental Europe as Chrysler-Simca 1609/1610/2 litres. After the takeover of Chrysler Europe by PSA Peugeot Citroën, the continental Europe models were renamed Talbot 1610/2 litres for 1979 and 1980 model years, after which the model was discontinued in Europe with the exception of Spain, where a diesel model was sold until 1982.

The large, American-inspired Chrysler fared quite poorly in the principal European markets. The replacement for the car was developed by Chrysler Europe under the codename C9 and was finally launched by PSA as the even more ill-fated Talbot Tagora.

== Development ==
Although Chrysler gradually took financial control of both Simca and Rootes Group during the 1960s, there was little effort to coordinate the operations of both automakers. Therefore, the first common European Chrysler car was actually a result of two separate development programs.

=== Rootes Group C Car ===
In 1966, under the direction of Roy Axe, the head of design, the Rootes Group team started working on what was internally named the "C Car" (in reference to the smaller "B car", which became the Hillman Avenger), a new large car for Rootes to replace the Humber Hawk (and the imported Australian Chrysler Valiant, which served as a placeholder in Rootes' lineup after the Hawk's demise in 1967). The plan was to market the car under three brands - the base version as Hillman, a 2.0-litre as Sunbeam 2000, and atop the range a Humber Hawk. A further development of the C Car with a stretched platform was planned, a "D Car", which was to replace the Humber Super Snipe.

The Rootes development program also comprised the development of a brand-new V6 engine of 2.0 and 2.5 litres, with a 60° vee angle. Other design propositions included the use of De Dion tubes for rear suspension (like in the competing Rover P6), as well as a five-speed gearbox (which would still be an advanced feature at that time). One of the engineers who worked on the design of the C Car was Tony Wheeler, who was later the founder of the Lonely Planet travel guides.

=== Simca Projet 929 ===
At the same time, in France, Simca was working on Projet 929, which would be Simca's first large car since the Vedette was discontinued in 1961, and also partially replace the Simca 1501 in its role of the range-topping Simca. The car would not use a V6 engine, as the displacement-based puissance fiscale tax system in France would make the costs prohibitive, but rather four-cylinder units of more modest specifications. There were three styling propositions prepared for the new car. The 929 XA was styled by Simca's design team, featuring angular design and rather top-heavy proportions. Bertone designed the 929 XB, which was much more rounded and somewhat reminiscent of contemporary BMWs. Finally, the 929 XC was sent from Chrysler's Detroit design studios, and was very American in style, resembling a smaller version of what then became the Australian VE Series Chrysler Valiant.

=== The decision ===
In early 1969, Chrysler realised that there were two potentially competing cars being developed and called for both the British and the French proposition to be presented before the general management of Chrysler Europe. The decision was taken to go ahead with the British C Car program, but to develop two versions for both the UK and the French part of the concern. Chrysler funded a new plant along with a development centre for the Rootes Group at the Whitley plant, Coventry, where the development was continued. Roy Axe employed former Chrysler USA designer Curt Gwinn as project designer, and the C Car took a shape very similar to an enlarged version of the Hillman Avenger. Initial designs were inspired by contemporary American Chryslers, with twin headlamps and a light bar in the rear.

In 1970, however, Chrysler reviewed the programme once again and decided to trim it down to just one version, to be built in Simca's Poissy factory in France for all markets. The responsibility for the programme was then passed to Simca (where it became known internally as "Simca 1800"), who gave the car a different front end with rectangular single front lamps, as well as stripping the interior of some features proposed by the Rootes Group team, such as genuine wood and leather and air conditioning. The V6 engine development was scrapped, despite the tooling for the new engine had been already installed in the Rootes' Humber Road factory. The production cars also received a more conventional coil sprung rear live axle and MacPherson struts in the front and a four-speed manual transmission (with an option of a three-speed automatic).

== Marketing ==
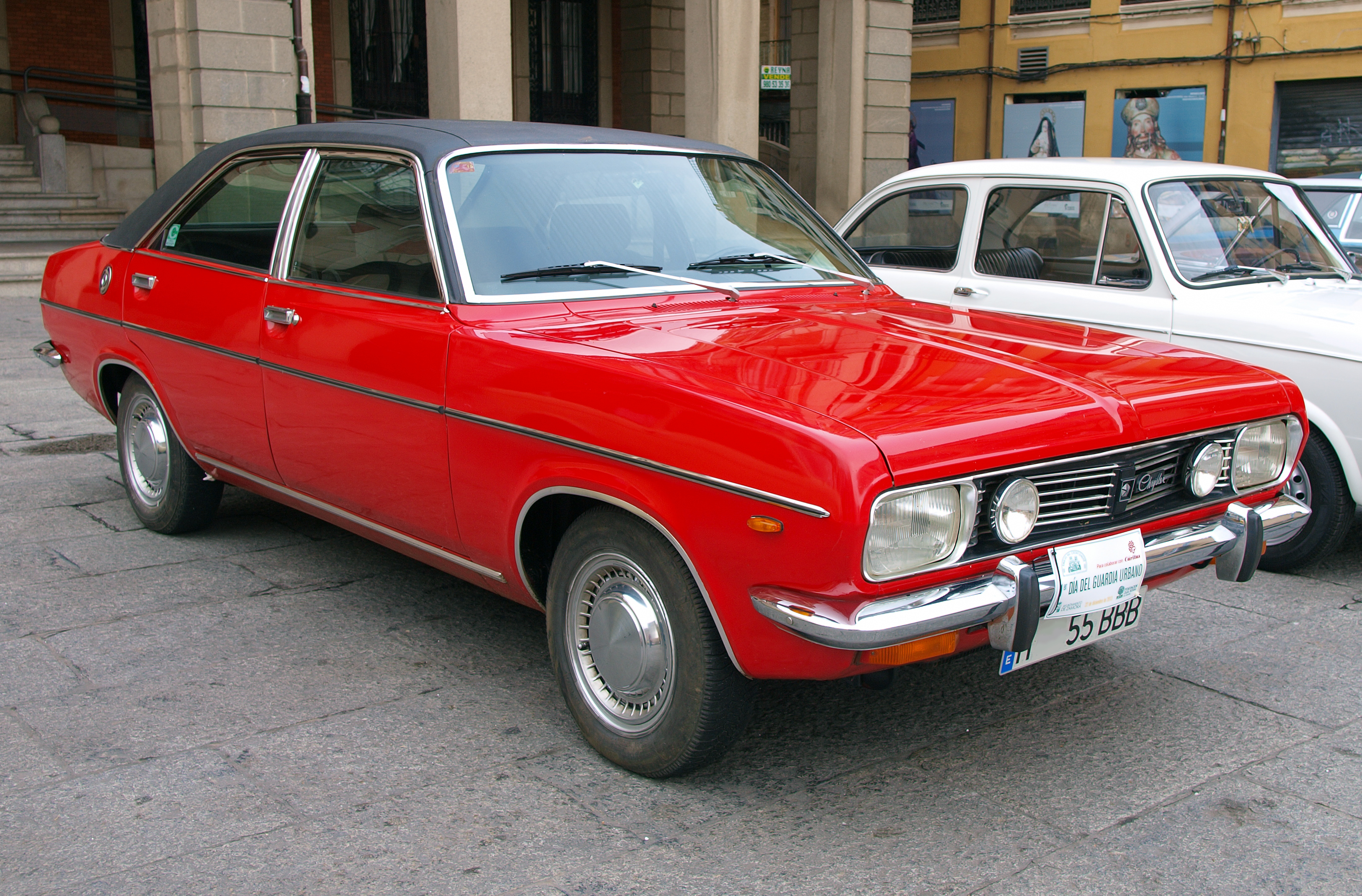
Spanish-built Chrysler 180

=== Launch ===
Following the renaming of Simca as "Chrysler France" and Rootes Group as "Chrysler UK" (which combined formed Chrysler Europe), the new large car was the first one to spearhead the concept of unifying the offerings from both sides of the Channel under the common brand. Thus, the vehicle was launched as Chrysler 160, 160 GT and 180. In a fashion similar to Simca models, the designations referred to the displacement of the engines employed by the given version. The 160 featured the 1632 cc unit, while the 180 came with the 1812 cc one. However, the 160 GT model came equipped with the larger engine. The 160 has 80 PS (59 kW) while the 160 GT and 180 have 97 PS (71 kW).

The three models were introduced in 1970 under the slogan " An American from Paris". The British launch took place in 1971, with only the 180 available. The 2.0 L model (marketed as "Chrysler 2 litre") joined the lineup for 1973, unveiled at the Amsterdam Auto Show in February that year. The 1981 cc unit was available only with Chrysler's TorqueFlite automatic transmission (which was an option on the 180 models), and the model came with features that distinguished it from the lesser versions, including a full-length vinyl roof (which became an option for the 160 and 180), bumper-mounted auxiliary driving lights and a small "2L" badge adorning the C-pillar. The 160 and 180 also gained some chrome and metal trim on the outside in 1972, and following the introduction of the 2.0-litre, all models featured 14-inch (rather than the previous 13-inch) road wheels and new hubcaps. The 160 GT was discontinued at the same time.

=== Press reaction ===
A Chrysler 180 saloon was tested by the British Motor magazine in April 1971, a few months after the model's UK launch. Top speed was 101.0 mph (162.5 km/h) and acceleration from 0-60 mph (97 km/h) took 12.4 seconds. An overall fuel consumption of 21.7 miles per imperial gallon (13.0 L/100 km; 18.1 mpg_{‑US}) was recorded. The tested car was ranked third out of five UK market competitor vehicles: competitors identified by the magazine, behind the Ford Cortina Mk III 2000 GXL and the Vauxhall VX 4/90. The overall tone of the road test, written at a time when new models were generally greeted with uncritical enthusiasm by UK motoring journalists, is summed up in its description of the Chrysler 180 as a "very pleasing car that only just falls short of being a luxury sporting saloon".

=== Barreiros ===
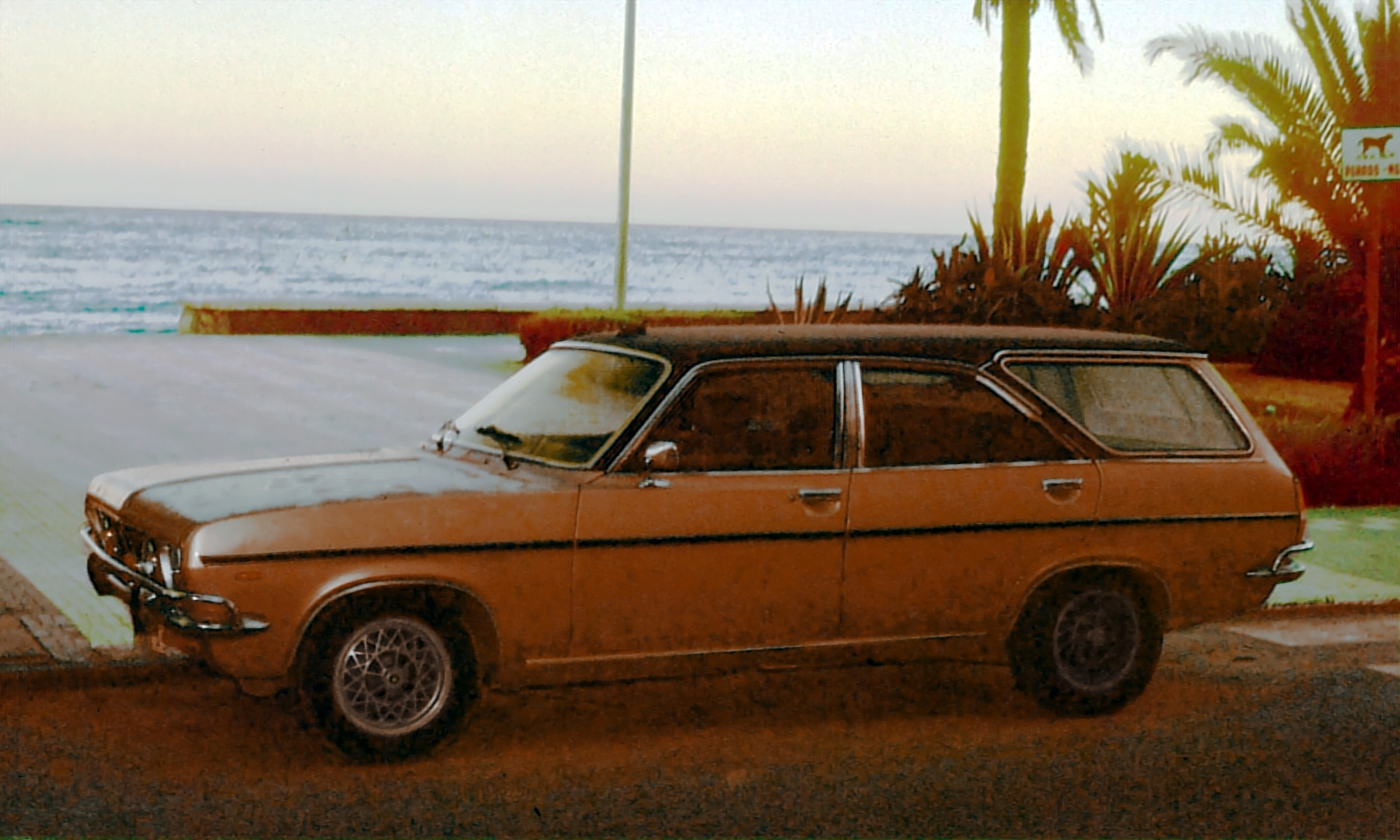
A Spanish Chrysler 180 converted to estate

Chrysler decided to move the assembly lines from the Poissy factory to the Villaverde plant of its Spanish subsidiary, Barreiros. Barreiros had been assembling many Simca and Chrysler models previously for the protected Spanish market, but for the first time, it would become the sole supplier of the entire model line for all markets. The vehicle became popular in its new home market, and local coachbuilders even created estate and stretched versions of the car. The lineup remained mostly unchanged in most markets, although the 160 was not offered in Spain, which in turn received a new diesel model, powered by the Barreiros 2.0 L diesel engine (not offered in other European markets).

==== Chrysler 180 Diesel ====
The four-cylinder diesel featured with indirect injection. It was mated to the four-speed manual transmission and delivered 48 kilowatts (65 hp). The diesel model came with the most basic 160 dashboard. A change to the Spanish lineup was forced by the November 1978 introduction of the Spanish taxation system, similar to France's puissance fiscale. The new 13 CV tax band imposed a rate of 35% and encompassed both the petroleum and diesel 2.0 L models. While the petroleum 2.0 Litre model was replaced by a 180 automatic version, the diesel engine had to be modified for 1978 to avoid increased taxation. The displacement was decreased from 2007 cc to 1917 cc (without a drop in actual maximum power or speed), just below the border of the 13 CV tax band, which stood at 1920 cc.

=== Later models ===
In 1977, the car was for the first time officially badged as Chrysler-Simca in continental Europe (the Simca badge appeared on the bootlid, while the stylised Chrysler plate continued to adorn the front end). The individual models were renamed to be in line with the newly launched Simca 1307/1308 series. While the first two digits in this model naming system stood for the base engine's displacement (1.6 L in the case of the Chrysler 160), the latter two represented the French fiscal class in which the car slotted. Thus, the 1.6 L model became the Chrysler-Simca 1609, as it fitted in the French 9 CV tax band (even though this model actually was dropped from the French market lineup), and the 1.8 L, slotting one class higher, became the Chrysler-Simca 1610, and was fitted with the vinyl roof and extra driving lamps from the 2.0 L model. However, in the UK, where only the 180 versions were marketed, it retained its name. To add to the confusion, the 2.0-litre retained its name in all markets.

==== PSA takeover ====
In 1979, the large Chrysler saw the sale of its parent company, Chrysler Europe, to the French PSA concern, due to Chrysler's financial difficulties. Some minor reshuffles in the range were made. The 1.8 L engine was discontinued—in France, 1610 now included the 2.0 L engine (which made it technically a "11 CV" car, but the name was not changed), while in Britain the 180 model was simply dropped, with the 2.0 L now being offered with either the manual or automatic transmission to mirror the continental lineup. A minor change of the exterior decals also occurred. From 1 August 1979, PSA decided to rename all previous Chrysler Europe cars as Talbots (and Talbot-Simcas in case of the French models, to capitalise on the established brand), and hence the Chrysler-Simca 1609 and 1610 became the Talbot Simca 1609 and 1610, and in Britain, the car became the Talbot 2 litre. The range was sold for only one year with the new names, as for 1981 PSA presented a replacement, the brand-new Talbot Tagora. Peugeot had originally intended to replace it with the Solara, the saloon version of the Alpine, which was launched in April 1980.

The production of petrol-engine Talbot 1610 stopped at the Barreiros plant, but diesel versions continued under the Talbot badge until 1982 for the Spanish market.

== Market reception ==
The Chrysler 180/2-litre found its best market in Spain after production had been transferred there in the later 1970s.

The marketplace was different in France and the UK. Its mixed pedigree and non-established brand did not fit in well with the expectations of more nationalistic buyers and reviewers. There was little that would make the car stand out among the crowd of similar cars, many of which already had an established position in the class. By 1976, with the number of cars sold in the UK not yet up to 10,000, British sales had settled down at the annual rate of about 2,000 which was seen to be below the company's expectations, but UK sales were greater than those in France. In France, the sales of the Chrysler were so disappointing that the old Simca 1501 was offered again for 1974 (it had been kept in production after Chrysler's launch, mainly for export markets, to use up the remaining parts).

The German Auto Katalog remarked that the car bore resemblance to the Opel Rekord C (which can perhaps be said not only of its styling, but also of almost identical dimensions and similar engine selection), yet it also pointed out that the Rekord in question was a four-year-old car at that time (and was subsequently replaced by a new model in 1971). In the British market the car's chances against rivals, such as the successful Rover SD1, were also hampered by the lack of engines larger than the 2.0 L, as the competitors offered six- or even eight-cylinder units, as they were not restricted by the French tax regulations. Moreover, Chrysler seemed not to support the model after its launch. Advertising was limited and updates scarce and insignificant. Chrysler did not make available an upmarket model with features as power windows or central locking, even though they were all available in the smaller Simca 1307, launched around the time when the 180 was in mid-cycle.

== Chrysler Centura ==
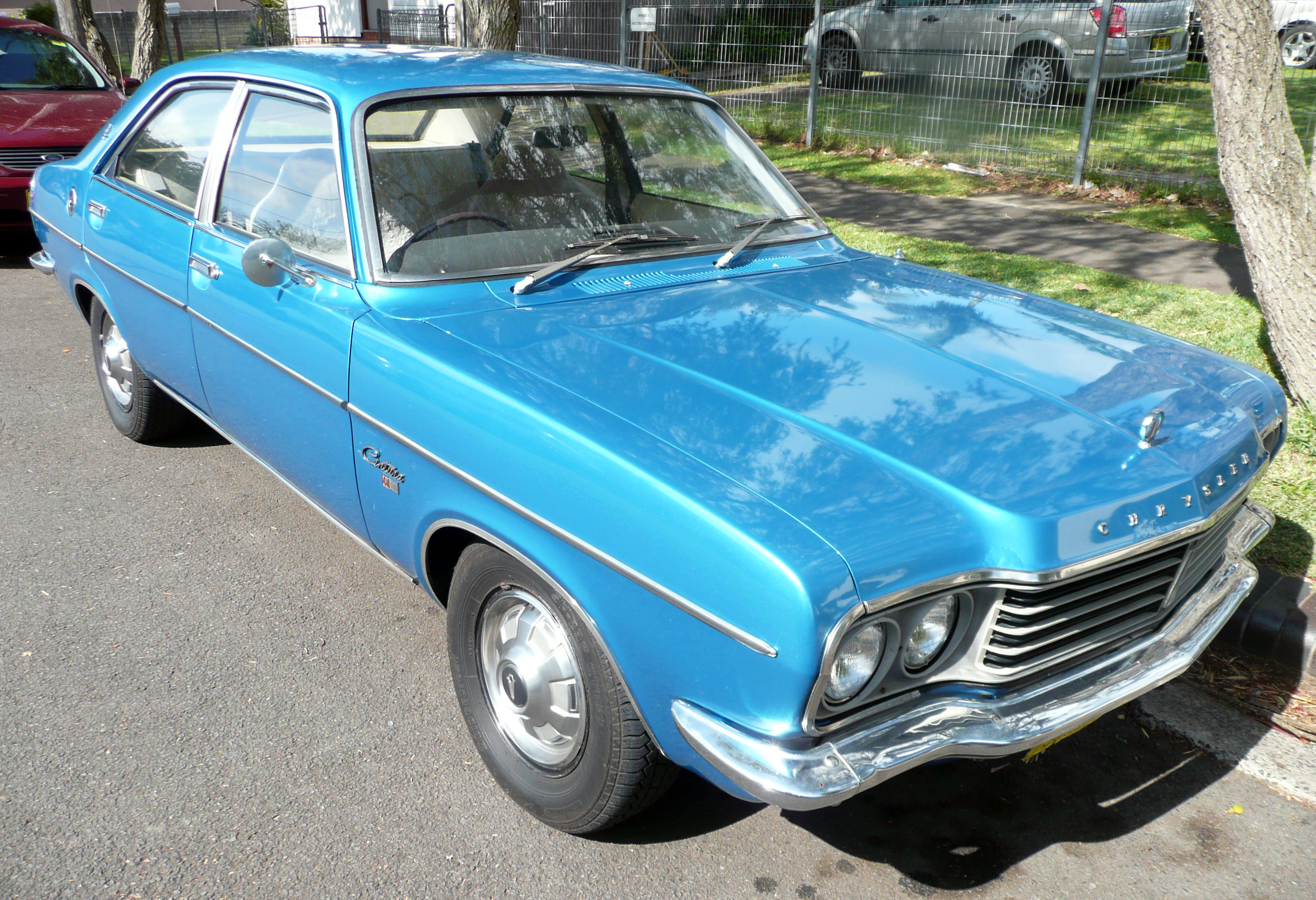
1977-1978 Chrysler Centura GL (KC)

A variant of the Chrysler 180 was produced in Australia from 1975 to 1978 by Chrysler Australia as the Chrysler Centura. The Centura was offered with a choice of 4-cylinder and 6-cylinder engines mated to a manual or automatic transmission. It was fitted with a larger nose and modified front radiator grille to accommodate the larger straight-six engine and allow more airflow to the radiator; four round headlamps completed the makeover.
