= Chrysler Hemi-6 Engine =

Chrysler Hemi-6
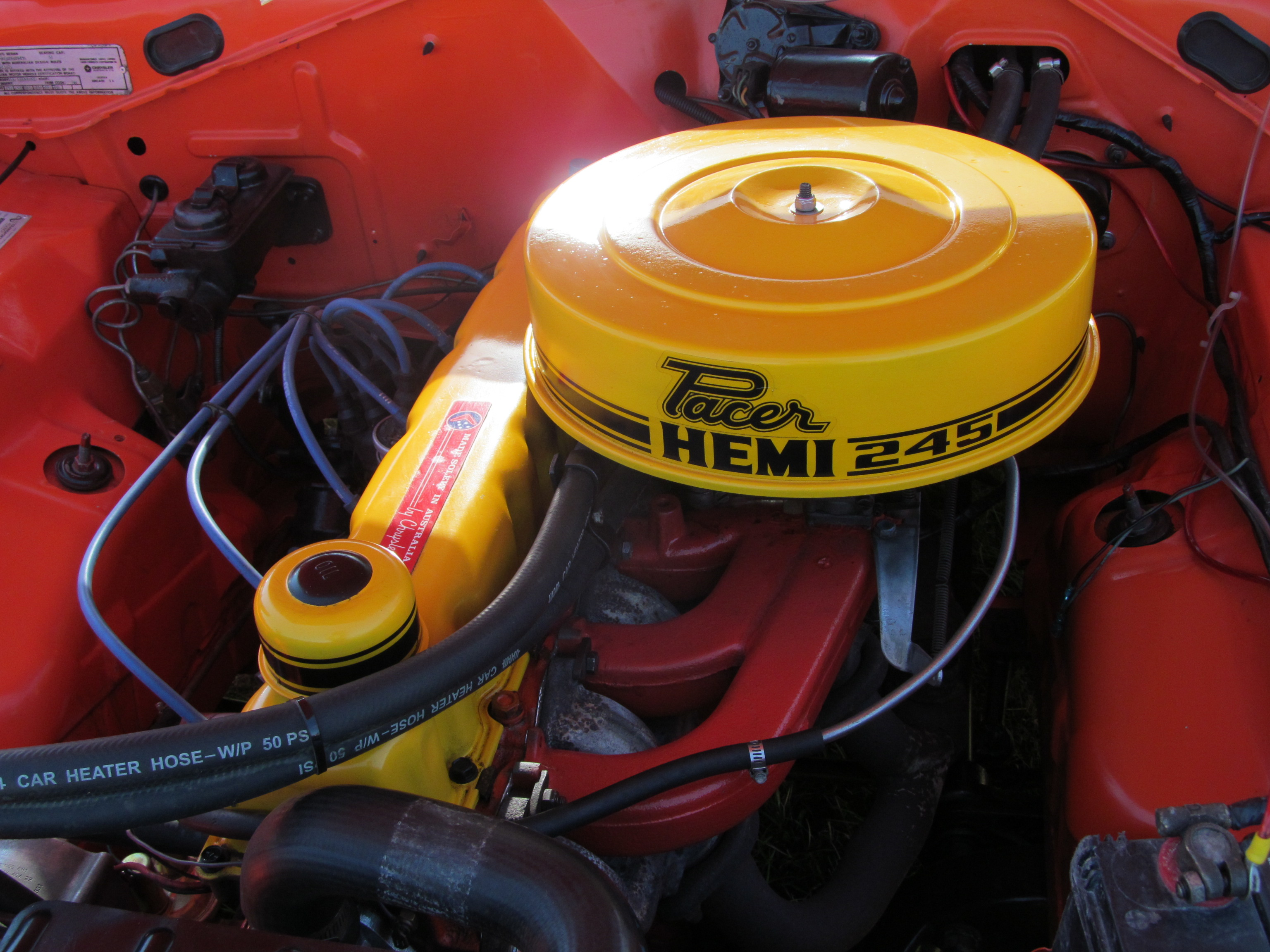

Overview
- Manufacturer: Chrysler Australia
- Production: 1970-1981

Layout
- Configuration: Naturally aspirated; Inline-6
- Displacement: 215 cu in (3,521 cc; 3.5 L); 245 cu in (4,018 cc; 4.0 L); 265 cu in (4,344 cc; 4.3 L)
- Cylinder bore: 3.52 in (89.41 mm); 3.76 in (95.50 mm); 3.91 in (99.31 mm)
- Piston stroke: 3.68 in (93.47 mm)
- Cylinder block material: Cast Iron
- Cylinder head material: Cast Iron
- Valvetrain: OHV 2 valves x cyl.

Combustion
- Fuel type: Petrol
- Oil system: Wet sump
- Cooling system: Water-cooled

Output
- Power output: 80–225 kW (109–306 PS; 107–302 hp)
- Torque output: 318–434 N⋅m (235–320 lb⋅ft)

The Chrysler Hemi-6 engine is a family of inline six-cylinder petrol engines produced by Chrysler Australia in three piston displacements and multiple configurations. Hemi-6 engines were installed in Australian-market Chrysler Valiants from 1970 through 1981. It was also installed in the Valiants closely related variants, the Chrysler VIP, the Chrysler by Chrysler and the Valiant Charger and also in the smaller Chrysler Centura.

== Development and release ==
Chrysler Corporation in the US had been working since 1966 on an inline 6-cylinder engine, called the D-engine, to replace the Slant 6 (G-engine) in Dodge trucks, but abandoned the effort after prototypes were built. This was Chrysler's first thin wall (lightweight) cast iron engine design. Chrysler Australia wanted a new six-cylinder engine for use in the Australian Chrysler Valiant, and so Chrysler USA sent a prototype engine to Chrysler Australia's engineers to continue developing the D-engine. The first 245 cu in (4.0 L) variant was released for the 1970 model year in the VG-model Valiant.

In a major coup for the company, Chrysler Australia's ad agency, the Young & Rubicam Advertising Agency in Adelaide, South Australia, secured the services of British racing driver Stirling Moss to promote the new Hemi-6 4.0 L (245 cu in) in 1969. The agency managed to fly Moss to Adelaide in secret for the advertising campaign, surprising Chrysler Australia's executives. Young & Rubicam's parent company were also the advertising agents for the Chrysler Corporation in the US.

== Engineering and design features ==
The Hemi-6 is a pushrod overhead valve engine (OHV), the combustion chambers comprise about 35% of the top of the globe, creating a low hemispherical combustion chamber.

The valves are angled apart (splayed) 18 degrees (included angle) along the crankshaft axis, and the intake valves are as large as 1.96 in (50 mm). The 6 intake and 6 exhaust valves open slightly towards each other and away from the cylinder wall, which results in less "shrouding" of the valves and greater airflow potential. In addition, both valves are slightly inclined across the crankshaft axis, similar to a conventional "wedge" chamber. On the cylinder head the 6 intake and 6 exhaust ports are on the same side of the engine. The rocker arms are mounted on individual studs.

The Australian Hemi engines were designed by a five-man team which included the late Maurice Harcus.

== Versions and variants ==
=== 245 cu in (4.0 L) ===
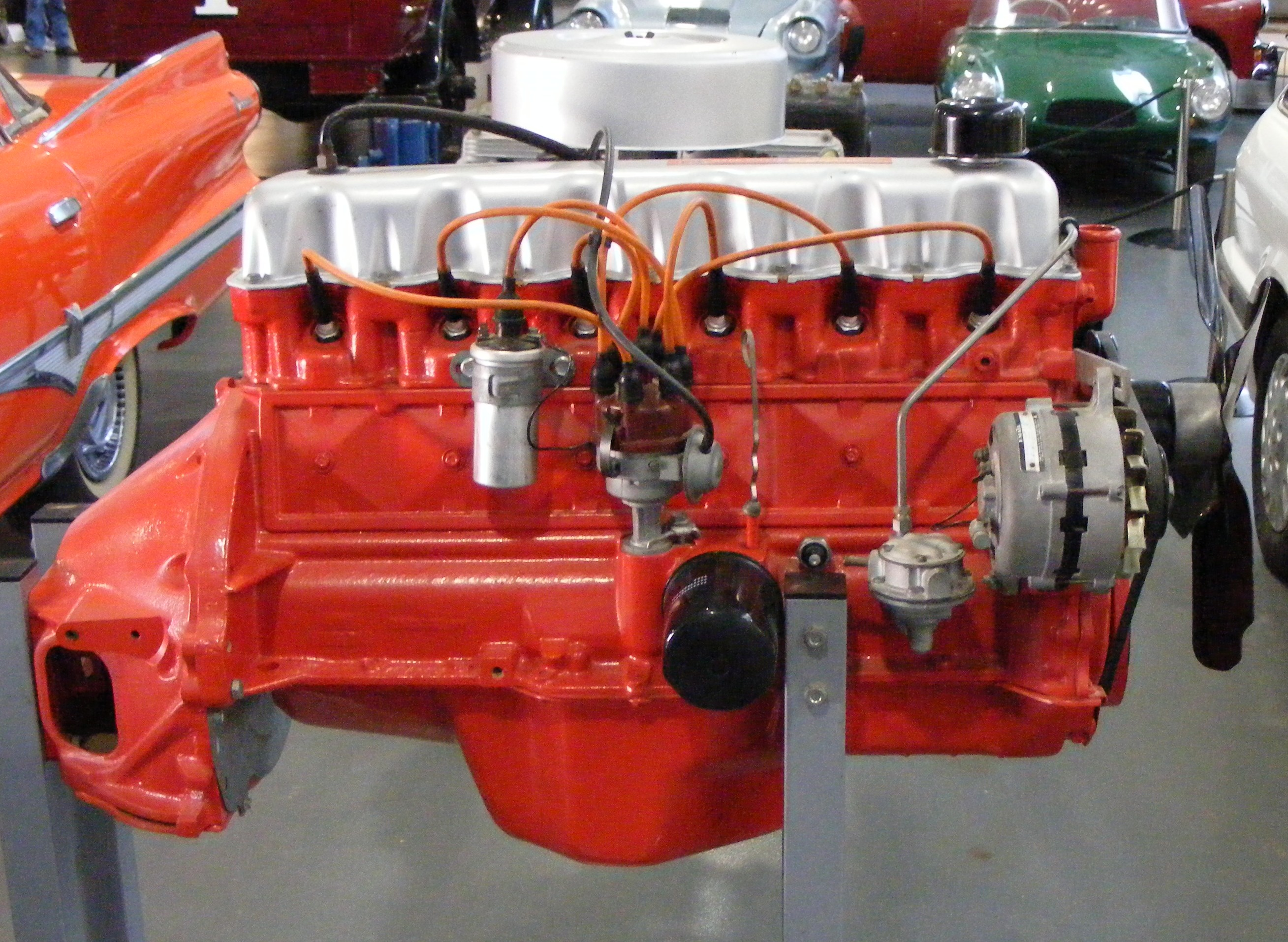
Chrysler "hemi" 245 prototype, on display at the National motor museum, Birdwood, South Australia

The 245 was the initial version of the Hemi-6 engine. It was first used in the 1970 VG-model Valiant, and was available clear through to the final CM model of 1981. Initially, only a single barrel carburettor version was available for Australian built cars but a two barrel version was made especially for the VH and VJ Valiant Ranger XL variants assembled in New Zealand from 1971 to 1975. The two barrel consequently became available in Australia with the VK series update.

Specifications (for 1bbl carbureted variant):

- Bore × Stroke Size: 3.76 in × 3.68 in (96 mm × 93 mm)
- Compression ratio: 9.5:1
- Power: 123 kW (167 PS; 165 hp) at 4600 rpm
- Torque: 318 N⋅m (235 lb⋅ft) at 1800 rpm
- Intake valve head diameter: 1.845 in (46.9 mm)
- Exhaust: 1 1/2-inch (38.1 mm)

245LC (Low Compression) released in 1977

- Bore × Stroke Size: 3.76 in × 3.68 in (96 mm × 93 mm)
- Compression ratio: 7.6:1
- Power: 130 hp (97 kW) estimate
- Torque: 180 lb⋅ft (244 N⋅m) estimate
- Intake valve head diameter 1.845-inch (46.9 mm)
- Exhaust valve head diameter 1 1/2-inch (38.1 mm)

=== 265 cu in (4.3 L) ===
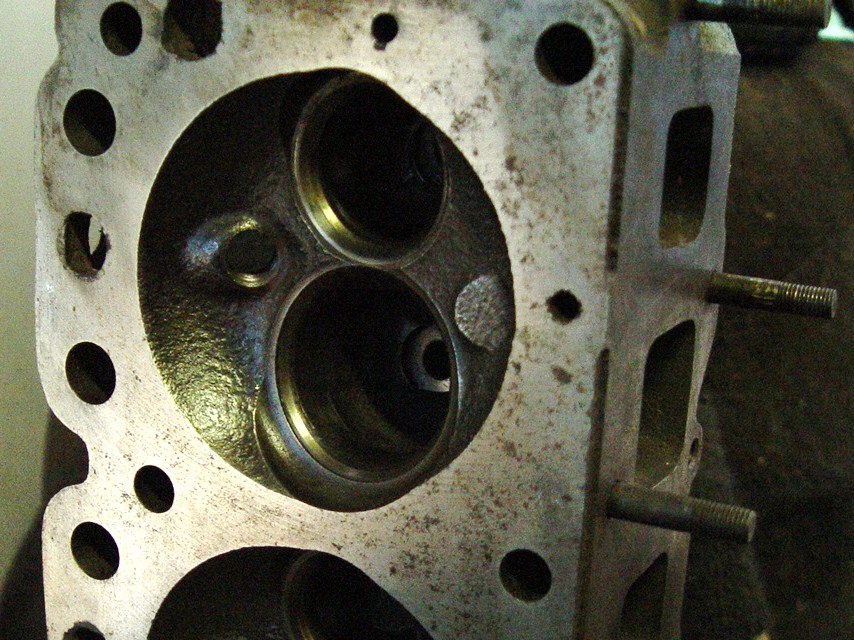
Chrysler Hemi 265ci 6-cylinder hemispherical combustion chambers with large intake and exhaust valves (removed) and big square ports

The 265 cu in (4.3 L) was introduced in 1971 in the VH. It used a new cylinder block with a bigger bore diameter of 3.91 in (99 mm)—the same as many of the Chrysler small-block V8s—and a new cylinder head, having slightly more hemispherical shaped combustion chambers with larger valves.

The standard version of the 265 produced 203 hp (151 kW) at 4600 rpm and 262 lb⋅ft (355 N⋅m) of torque at 2800 rpm.

The top-of-the-line performance engine in the E49 Chargers produced 302 hp (225 kW) at 5600 rpm and 320 lb⋅ft (434 N⋅m) of torque at 4400 rpm. The increased power is due mainly to a more aggressive camshaft, high-load valve springs, triple 45 mm (1.8 in) DCOE sidedraught Weber carburetors, tuned-length exhaust headers and a higher compression ratio of 10.0:1.

Specifications (for 2bbl carbureted variant):

- Bore × Stroke Size: 3.91 in × 3.68 in (99 mm × 93 mm)
- Compression ratio: 9.5:1
- Power: 151 kW (202 hp) at 4600 rpm
- Torque: 355 N⋅m (262 lb⋅ft) at 2800 rpm
- Intake valve head diameter: 1.96 in (49.8 mm)
- Exhaust: 1.6 in (40.6 mm)

=== 215 cu in (3.5 L) ===
This economy-orientated version of the Hemi 6 was released as a running change in early 1971 as the base model engine in the VH Valiant. This engine shares the same stroke length as the other engines but has a smaller bore size of 3.52 in (89 mm) and lower compression ratio of 8.0:1. It ran on regular petrol and produced 104 kW (139 hp) at 4400 rpm and 270 N⋅m (199 lb⋅ft) of torque at a low 1800 rpm.

Specifications:

- Bore × Stroke Size: 3.52 in × 3.68 in (89 mm × 93 mm)
- Compression ratio: 8.0:1
- Power: 104 kW (139 hp) at 4400 rpm
- Torque: 270 N⋅m (199 lb⋅ft) at 1800 rpm
- Intake valve head diameter: 1.835 in (46.6 mm)
- Exhaust valve head diameter: 1 1/2 in (38.1 mm)
