= Simca Type 180 =

Four-cylinder automotive engine

The Type 180 was an automobile straight-4 OHC engine produced in the 1970s.

== 1.6/1.8 ==
These engines (1,639/1,812 cc) were used in the Chrysler 160/180, a car also sold under a multiplicity of other names.

Applications:

- Chrysler 160 / Chrysler-Simca 1609 / Talbot-Simca 1609 (1.6-litre)
- Chrysler 160GT, 180 / Chrysler-Simca 1610 (1.8-litre)

== 2.0 ==
The 1,981 cc Type 180 was most common. It was used in various Chrysler Europe and Simca models.

Applications:

- Chrysler 2-litre / Chrysler-Simca 2-litre / Talbot-Simca 1610/Talbot 2-litre
- Chrysler Centura

== 2.2 ==
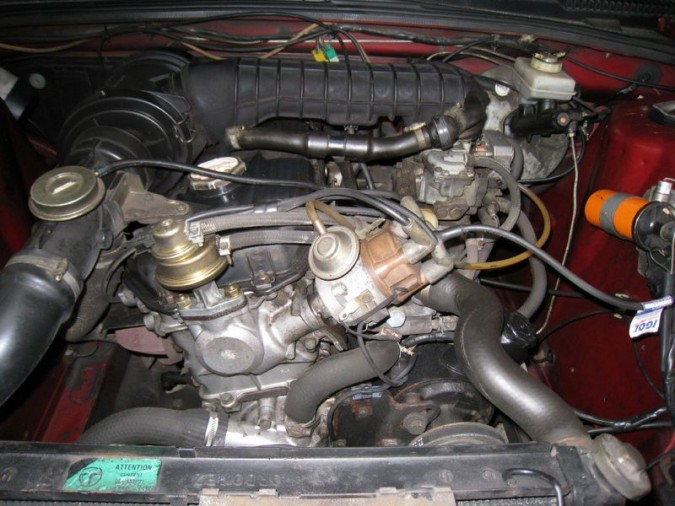
2.2-litre engine in a Talbot Tagora GLS

A 2.2 L (2,155 cc) version was also built. It was first used in the Talbot Tagora. Bore was 91.7 mm (3.61 in) and stroke was 81.6 mm (3.21 in), making an oversquare design. This engine is sometimes confused with the 2,165 cc Renault/Peugeot Douvrin engine, but the displacement of the Simca 180 2.2-litre was slightly less. Later, this engine was also turbocharged, for use in the Citroën BX4TC and Peugeot 505 Turbos as the block was stronger than the Peugeot engine. Peugeot called the engine the N9T; the 1984 version with an intercooler was the N9TE and the more powerful 180 PS (132 kW) model from 1986 was called the N9TEA.

Applications:

- Citroën BX 4TC
- Matra Murena 2.2
- Peugeot 505 Turbo
- Talbot Tagora GLS
