= Fiat Chrysler Australia =

Automobile manufacturer

Stellantis (Australia and New Zealand) Pty Ltd
- Logo for Stellantis, used by the company after the merger

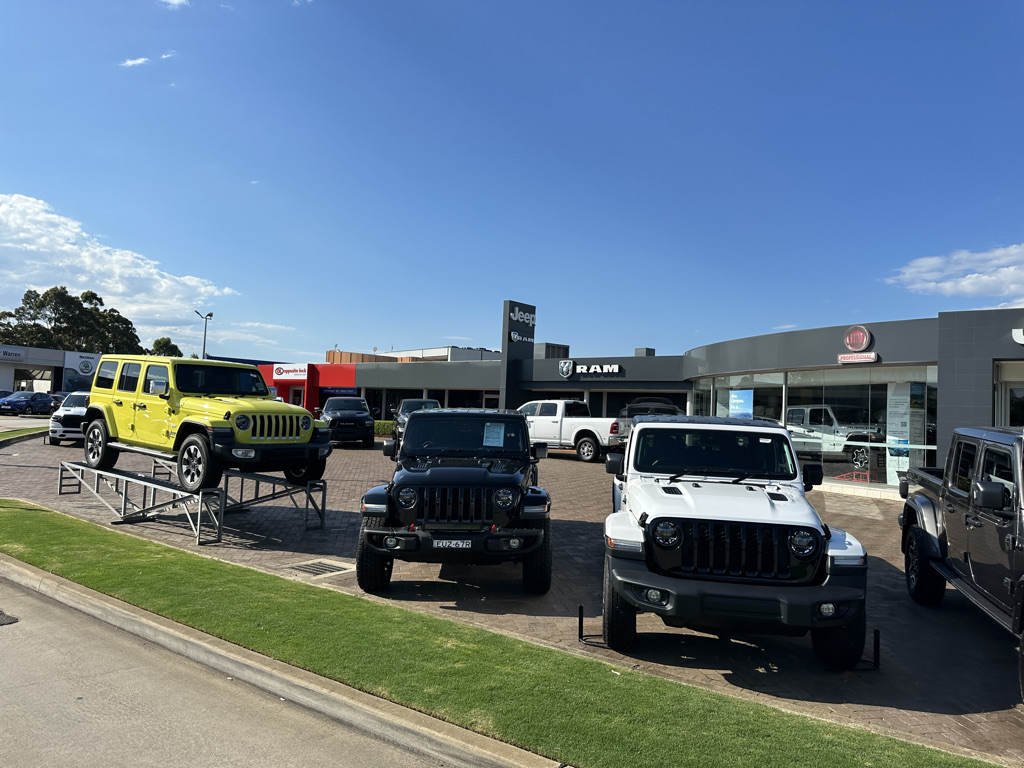
- Fiat and Ram Trucks dealerships in Warwick Farm, New South Wales
- Type: Subsidiary
- Industry: Automotive
- Predecessor: Chrysler Australia Ltd
- Founded: 1951; 75 years ago in Adelaide, Australia
- Headquarters: Port Melbourne, Australia
- Products: Automobiles
- Parent: Stellantis

Stellantis (Australia and New Zealand) Pty Ltd (formerly FCA Australia), is the official Stellantis subsidiary in Australia and New Zealand, operating as distributor of Chrysler, Jeep, Dodge, Abarth, Alfa Romeo, Fiat and Leapmotor vehicles.

From 1951 to 1980 Chrysler Australia Ltd operated as a vehicle manufacturer, it was purchased by Mitsubishi in 1980 with vehicles continuing to be produced under the Chrysler brand until 1981 by Mitsubishi Motors Australia. Chrysler returned to the Australian market in 1994 with imported vehicles.

== Establishment ==
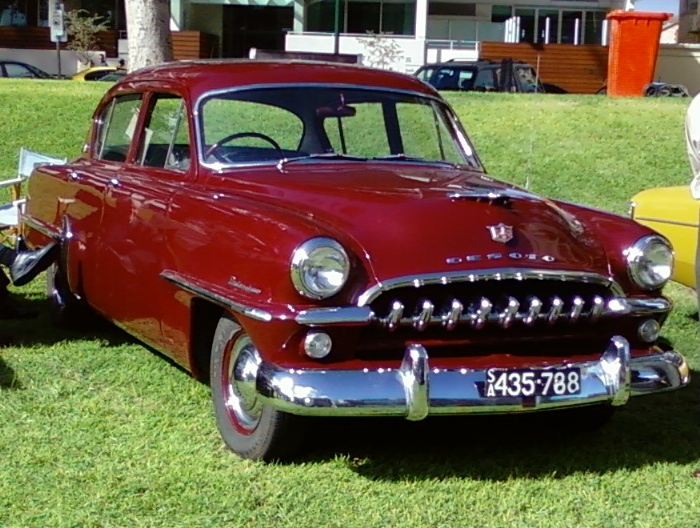
The De Soto Diplomat was built by Chrysler Australia in Sedan and Coupe Utility form from 1954 to 1957

Chrysler Australia Ltd was established in June 1951 when the Chrysler Corporation acquired Chrysler Dodge Distributors (Holdings) Pty Ltd, a company which had been formed in 1935 by 18 independent distributors.

During the 1950s and 1960s, Chrysler made a substantial investment in Australian manufacturing facilities. It consolidated assembly from other state capitals to its expanding operations in Adelaide. Vehicle production for Victoria, Tasmania and New South Wales was in Adelaide from 1953 with Perth and Brisbane assembly ceasing in 1954. The company had several facilities at Finsbury in Adelaide's northwest. The trim shop (car seats and interiors) and steel pressings (chassis components) produced components which were sent to Keswick for assembly. Chrysler also had an aircraft division which manufactured components for Canberra bombers, Jindivik drones and Winjeel trainers. Chrysler recruited both local men and young single men from interstate to staff the growth.

Initially, Chrysler Australia assembled North American Chrysler passenger cars and trucks. Its most popular car in the 1950s was the US sourced badge engineered trio: Plymouth Cranbrook, Dodge Kingsway and De Soto Diplomat, each based on the 1954 US Plymouth. A coupe utility variant was also developed by Chrysler Australia and this was marketed in nine different versions; the Plymouth Cranbrook, Savoy & Belvedere, the Dodge Kingsway Custom, Kingsway Crusader & Kingsway Coronet and the De Soto Diplomat Custom, Diplomat Regent & Diplomat Plaza. The Plymouth sedan was a popular choice for taxicab usage however the rise in popularity of the Holden during this decade led to the decline of this range of cars.

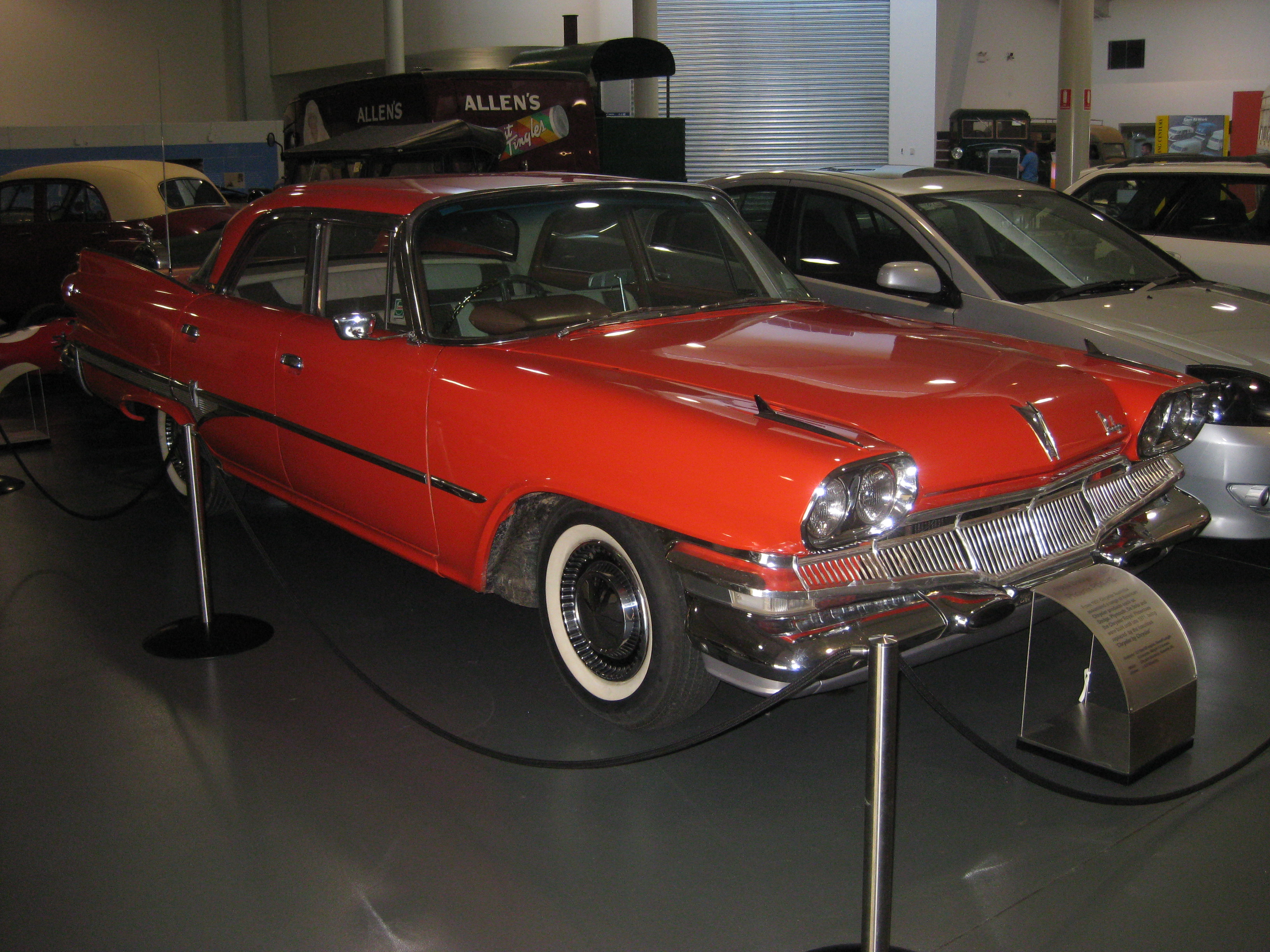
The Dodge Phoenix was produced by Chrysler Australia from 1960 (pictured) to 1973

In 1957, Chrysler Australia consolidated each of the badge-engineered marques in one car—the Chrysler Royal. This was a facelifted version of the 1954 Plymouth that continued in production until 1963. The Royal was an automotive curiosity. Starting life as a side-valve 6-cylinder manual, with 3-speed manual column gearchange, it was progressively modified, with the addition of US sourced engineering features such as power steering, the push button "Powerflite" automatic transmission and an OHV V8. On the styling front US "Forward Look" style tailfins were grafted on the rear of the car, while the front end gained dual (vertically stacked) headlights. These changes failed to arrest the slide in sales, as General Motors-Holden came to dominate the Australian market, and the Royal was viewed as being outmoded and expensive. Production ceased in 1963.

The saving grace for Chrysler at this time was the French Simca Aronde—a popular 4-cylinder compact car which Chrysler Australia assembled from CKD kits at its Forestville factory. Local engineers developed an Aronde station wagon unique to Australia, with a then-novel wind-down rear window and tailgate. (Chrysler USA had acquired an interest in Simca in 1958, the basis for sourcing of this car). The assembly and marketing of Simca Aronde and Vedette models by Chrysler Australia was announced on 1 July 1959.

In both 1958 and 1959, Chrysler Australia released Plymouth Belvedere, Dodge Custom Royal and DeSoto Firesweep models which were imported from the US in CKD form and assembled at Chrysler's Adelaide facilities. The Plymouth was fitted with a 318-cubic-inch V8 engine and the Dodge and de Soto models featured a 361-cubic-inch V8. Assembly of the three models was discontinued in 1960 and they were replaced by a single model, the Dodge Phoenix, which was produced by Chrysler Australia through to 1973.

In 1964, Chrysler opened its Tonsley Park assembly plant located in the Adelaide suburb of Clovelly Park. An engine manufacturing plant was opened at Lonsdale in November 1967. These new factories replaced facilities at Keswick, Mile End and Finsbury. During this time, Chrysler Australia established its position as the third of the "Big 3" Australian motor manufacturers behind Holden and Ford Australia.

== Chrysler Valiant ==
=== 1960s ===
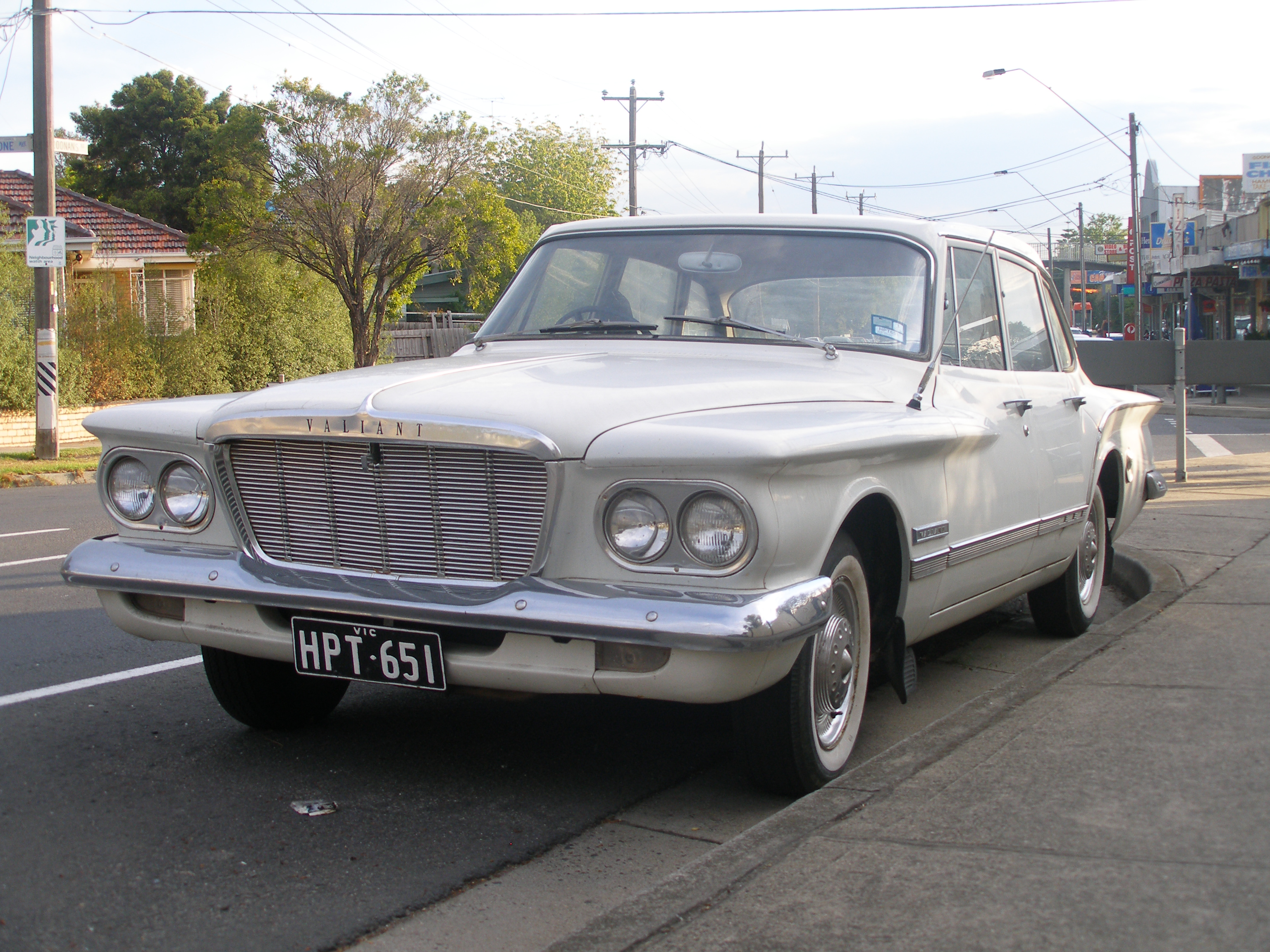
The Chrysler S Series Valiant. The Valiant was produced by Chrysler Australia from 1962 to 1980

Beginning in 1962, Chrysler Australia assembled the American Plymouth Valiant, marketed as the Valiant by Chrysler. By 1963, they had developed a local version, the AP5 Valiant, with distinctive styling giving the car a separate identity from the US Plymouth and Dodge variants. The reason for developing different styling was concern that the local manufacturer could not afford to make substantial styling changes as quickly as in the US. Hence, a modified appearance would minimise the risk of accusations that Australia was selling "last year's model".

Through the 1960s, Chrysler expanded the Valiant range, with 2-door hardtop, long wheelbase (VIP) and sporty (Pacer) variants.

Also, in 1966, with the Chrysler USA acquisition of the British Rootes Group, Chrysler Australia took over the Rootes Australia as well as the operation of their Port Melbourne factory. The principal Rootes model sold in Australia was the Hillman Hunter and this car became a steady seller for Chrysler until 1973.

=== 1970s ===
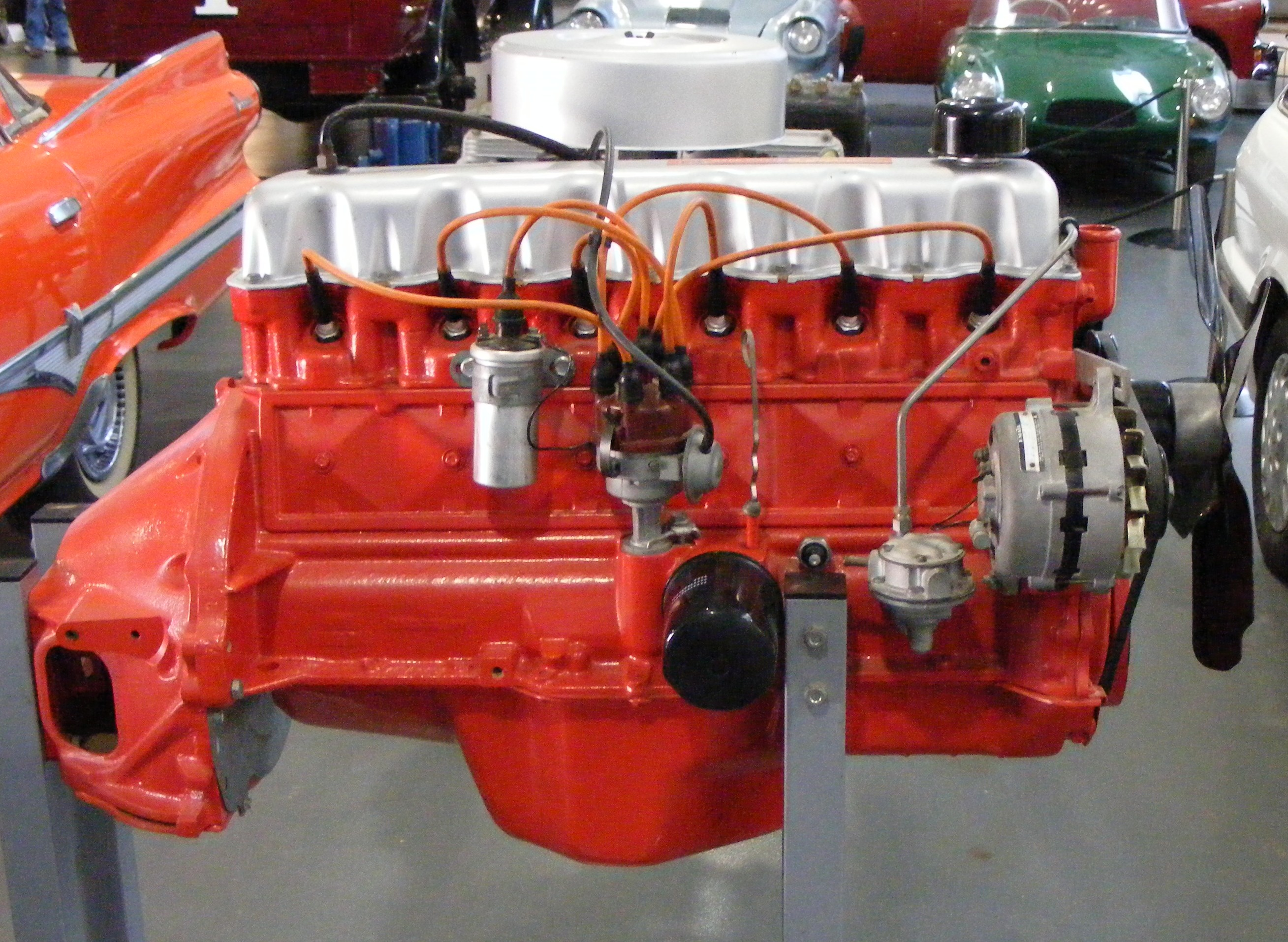
Prototype of the "Hemi" 245-cubic-inch engine

In 1970, they introduced the unique-to-Australia "Hemi" 6-cylinder engine—launched with an endorsement from Stirling Moss. Billed as being "Right—for all the right reasons", this engine went on to become the most powerful 6-cylinder engine produced in Australia (equipped with triple Weber carburettors). Though this engine was based on a US engine design for trucks, it was never produced in North America.

The Valiant was a good seller, but never quite gained the level of market acceptance as its major competitors—the Holden and the Falcon.

In 1971, Chrysler Australia released the Valiant VH model (still based on the US A-Body platform), it was significantly wider than earlier Valiants, with the lineup including the memorable Valiant Charger. This was a short-wheelbase (105-inch) two-door hardtop version of the standard Valiant. The car had distinctive sporty styling, including an integrated rear spoiler.

The base model Charger was A$2750, and the range extended upwards with high-performance and luxury models.

Charger won the "Wheels" magazine Car of the Year award in 1971. It was also a winner in the sales stakes, capturing the imagination of the Australian public in the same way as the Ford Mustang did in the US and the Ford Capri did in the UK.

By the mid-1970s, sales of the Valiant range stalled, as a combination of factors worked against Chrysler Australia:

1. The Oil Crisis led to the rise of smaller economical 4-cylinder cars;
2. Japanese competitors made significant inroads into the Australian marketplace, and 4-cylinder cars were their forte;
3. Valiant was increasingly perceived as being outmoded—notwithstanding a major facelift in 1971 (billed as an "all-new" model) with a new body surrounding the existing mechanicals—the styling rapidly dated compared with other new cars, and the body was only lightly facelifted in 1973 and 1975. A significant facelift in 1976 arrested the slide in sales, and the Valiant continued to sell steadily until 1981.

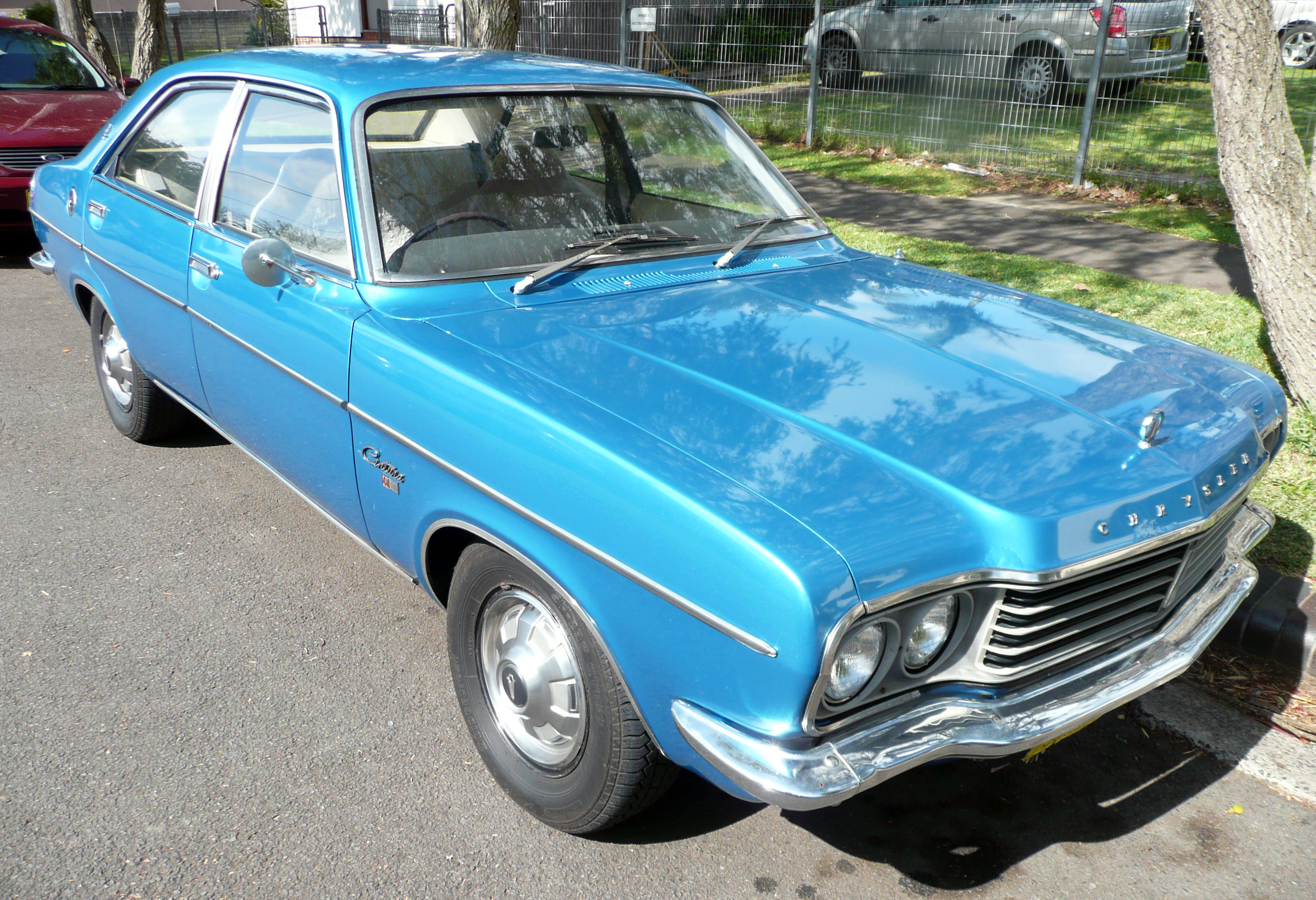
Chrysler KB Centura

In 1975, Chrysler introduced the Centura with a choice of a 2-litre (4-cylinder) and 3.5-litre or 4-litre (6-cylinder) engines, and two equipment levels, XL and GL. This was a medium-sized competitor for the Holden Torana and the Ford Cortina.

The 'KB' Centura was based on the European Chrysler 180 (which had been introduced in Europe in 1970), with facelifted front and rear styling (reputedly based on the intended design for a Sunbeam version of this car, which never reached production).

The launch of the Centura was delayed by several years as a result of embargoes placed on French imports, due to France conducting Pacific nuclear bomb tests, which impeded the supply of parts.

By the time the car arrived in Australia, its appearance was dated and, as a result, the Centura did not generate significant market interest. A mild 'KC' Centura update in GL and GLX variants combined with a simplified choice of two versions of the 4-litre engine arrived in 1977, but the car then quietly disappeared from the market by the end of 1978.

== Relationship with Mitsubishi Motors ==
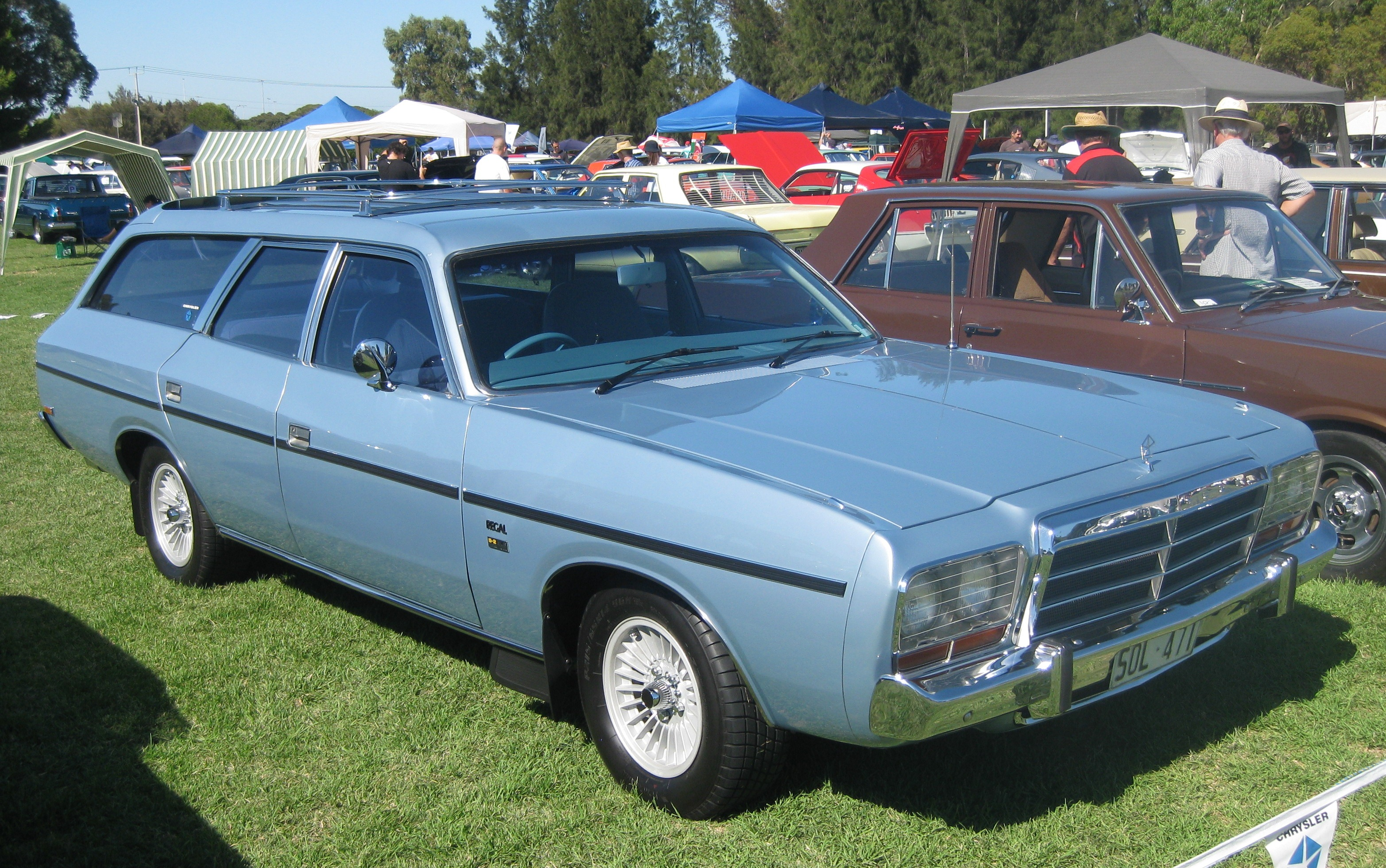
Chrysler CM Regal Wagon. Production of CM series Valiants and Regals was continued by Mitsubishi after its takeover of Chrysler Australia

Chrysler Australia's parent company began working closely with Mitsubishi Motors Corporation after they acquired a 15 percent interest in the company in 1971, with the result that Chrysler Australia began building the Mitsubishi-designed Chrysler Valiant Galant. The association with Mitsubishi also gave Chrysler Australia another winner—the 1977 Chrysler Sigma. With a range of 4-cylinder "Silent Shaft" engines, competitive pricing, "Japanese" style and the availability of a luxurious "SE" version, with optional leather trim (an innovative sales approach in its era), the Sigma marked Chrysler's sales comeback. Sigma soon became market leader in its class.

In 1979, Mitsubishi Motors Corporation and Mitsubishi Corporation each acquired a one sixth equity in Chrysler Australia and in April 1980 the two companies purchased the remaining shares in the company from the US Chrysler Corporation, which was in bailout negotiations with the US government. The company name was changed to Mitsubishi Motors Australia Limited on 1 October 1980. Mitsubishi continued to build the Valiant models with Chrysler badging until August 1981 and production of the Sigma range continued under the Mitsubishi name until 1987. Colt, Magna, Verada and 380 models were subsequently produced before production of passenger vehicles was discontinued in March 2008. The company continues to operate today as one of Australia's major importers of road vehicles.

== Return to Australian market ==
Chrysler returned to Australia in 1994, initially importing the Jeep Cherokee, then expanding the range to include the Chrysler Neon (discontinued in 2002) Grand Cherokee, Jeep Commander, PT Cruiser, Crossfire, 300C, Voyager and Dodge Caliber. Initially, the attraction of the Jeep range was "value for money" although the first cars became known for poor quality of construction.

In the 2000s, a range of vehicles were imported from the United States, Canada, Mexico, and Austria. The Chrysler 300C found a successful niche as an alternative to Australian prestige cars—generally extended-wheelbase versions of traditional Australian family cars—the Holden Statesman/Caprice and Ford Fairlane/LTD.

In 2012, Chrysler Australia took over the distribution responsibilities for Alfa Romeo, Fiat and Fiat Commercial.

In 2013, the RAM brand of trucks was introduced to the Australian market, converted locally by ASV, at the Holden Special Vehicles facility in Clayton, Victoria.

The Chrysler marque was withdrawn from the Australian market on 19 November 2021 as its only model, the Chrysler 300, has been discontinued.
