= Talbot Tagora =

Executive saloon by Talbot

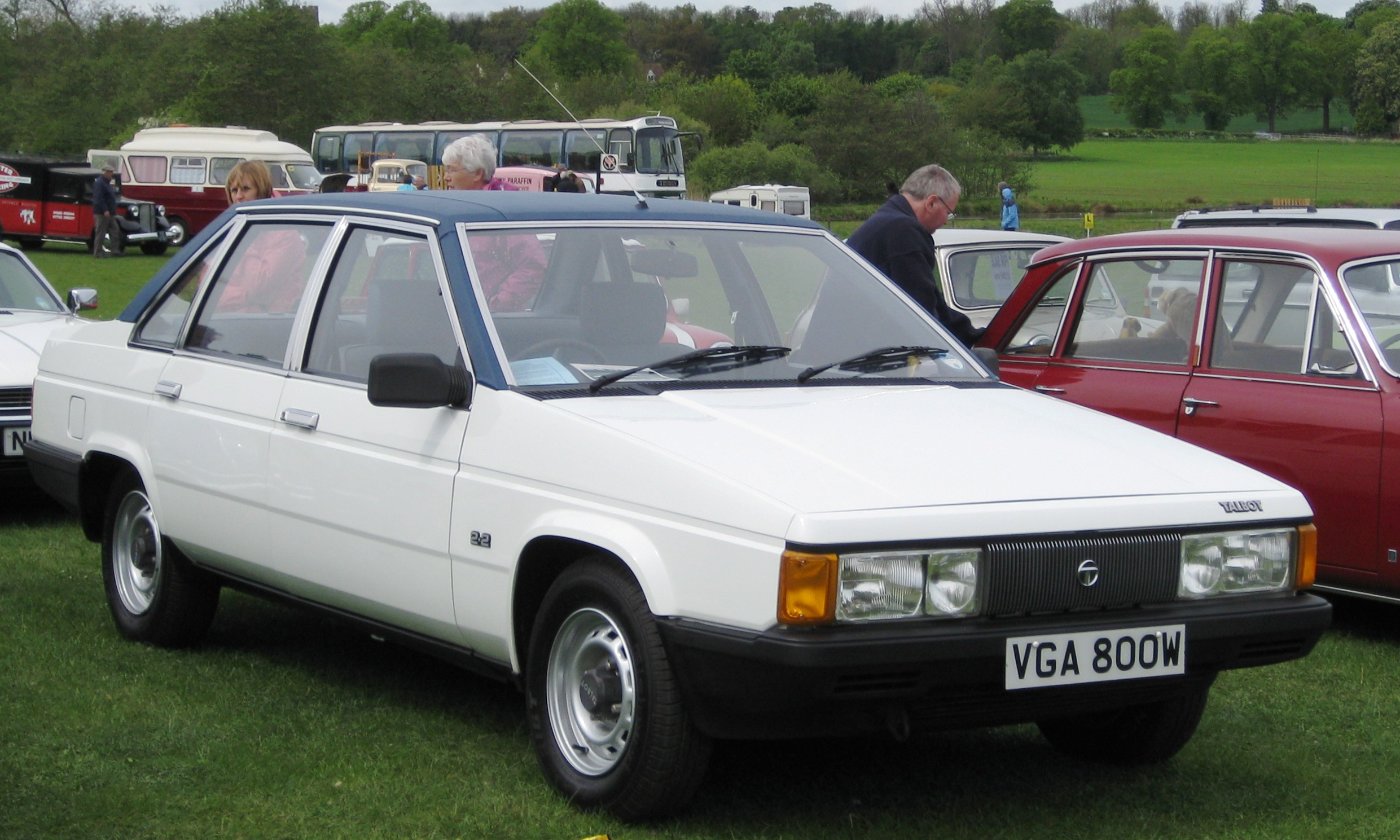
- Talbot Tagora 2.2 saloon

Overview
- Manufacturer: Talbot (PSA Group)
- Production: 1980–1983
- Assembly: France: Poissy (Poissy Plant)
- Designer: Roy Axe

Body and chassis
- Class: Executive car
- Body style: 4-door saloon
- Layout: FR layout

Powertrain
- Engine: 2.2 L Type 180 I4; 2.7 L PRV V6; 2.3 L XD2S turbodiesel I4
- Transmission: 4-speed manual 5-speed manual 3-speed automatic

Dimensions
- Wheelbase: 2,808 mm (110.6 in)
- Length: 4,828 mm (190.1 in)
- Width: 1,810 mm (71.3 in)
- Height: 1,444 mm (56.9 in)
- Kerb weight: 1255–1345 kg (2767–2965 lb)

Chronology
- Predecessor: Chrysler 180/2 litre Dodge 3700 (Spain)
- Successor: Peugeot 605

The Talbot Tagora is an executive car developed by Chrysler Europe and produced by Peugeot Société Anonyme (PSA). The Tagora was marketed under the Talbot marque after PSA took over Chrysler's European operations in 1979. PSA presented the first production vehicle in 1980 and launched it commercially in 1981. The Tagora fell short of sales expectations, described as a "showroom flop" just a year after its launch, and PSA cancelled the model two years later. Fewer than 20,000 Tagora models were built, all of them at the former Simca factory in Poissy, near Paris, France.

== Development ==
Chrysler Europe began development of the Tagora in 1976, under the code name C9, with the goal of replacing the unsuccessful Chrysler 180 series. Following the same development pattern as with the Horizon and Alpine models, the responsibility for the Tagora's technical development remained in France, while the styling was devised at Chrysler's design centre in the United Kingdom. An early proposal for the name of the car was "Simca 2000".

=== Design ===
The original C9 prototype was a modern-styled saloon with a low beltline and large interior dimensions made possible by the long-wheelbase. The British design team initially proposed some stylistic features inspired by the Citroën SM, including a front glass panel between the headlights to accommodate the number plate, round front wheelarches and rear spats. However, Chrysler management in the United States deemed these features too extravagant, so the design of the C9 became more conventional: front and rear wheelarches were squared off and the spats lost, and the license plate was placed on the front bumper as on most cars. To better balance the tall silhouette, the beltline was raised. Over the course of development, the C9 also lost its vertical taillights in favour of more "fashionable" horizontal ones.

=== Engine dilemma ===
The main competitors in the executive vehicle market offered engines bigger than the biggest 2.0-litre inline-four engine used by Chrysler Europe, and a six-cylinder engine was generally expected. Consequently, the company had to seek a new engine for the Tagora. One candidate was a straight-six manufactured by Mitsubishi, but it proved unsuitable for a car of this class. The other proposal was the Douvrin V6 engine (the "PRV"), a joint development of PSA, Renault and Volvo. Since the Tagora would be in direct competition with PSA models that used the PRV, it seemed unlikely that Chrysler would be able to procure that engine.

=== Sales projections ===
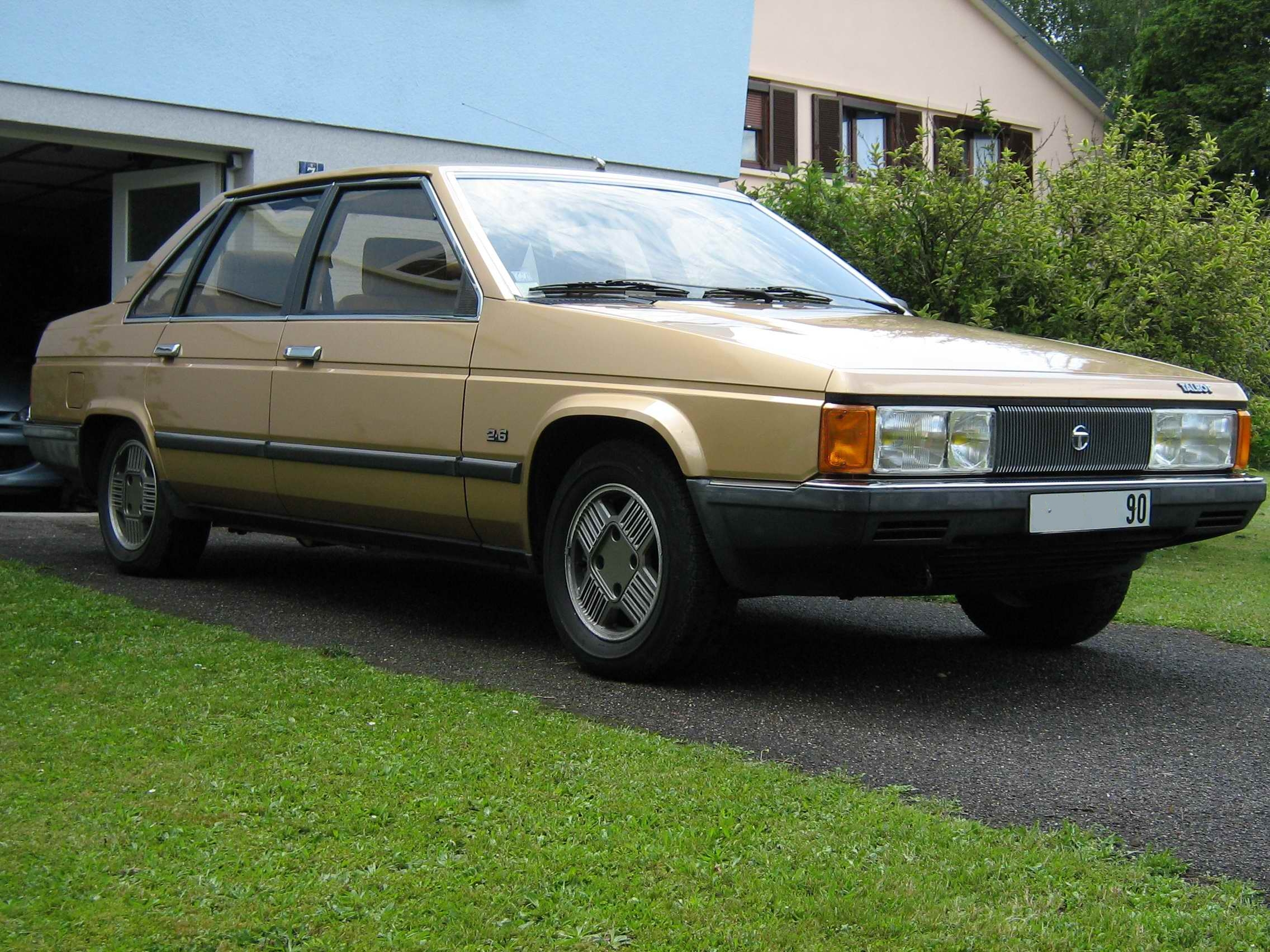
The Tagora SX was the line-up's flagship, featuring the 2.6-litre engine and alloy wheels.

Chrysler Corporation approved the development of the model on the assumption that Chrysler Europe would sell 60,000 C9 models per year, which translated into a projected 5 percent share of the executive car market. This estimate seemed achievable because Chrysler had a 7 percent market share in Europe overall. The projected sales would have covered the car's tooling costs, with the development costs accounted for separately, as part of an independent annual budget.

=== PSA takeover ===
During the development of the C9, the management of the bankruptcy-threatened Chrysler Corporation decided to divest itself of its debt-ridden European operations. The buyer was the French PSA Group, formed in 1976 after Peugeot took over Citroën. The deal was finalised in 1978, in which the buyer paid US$1.00 for the entirety of Chrysler Europe and its obligations. The take-over was effective as of 1 January 1979.

While the C9 project was well advanced, PSA already had a crowded lineup in the large vehicle segment, including the renowned Citroën CX, the slow-selling Peugeot 604 and the newly launched Peugeot 505. But with so much having already been invested in the project, PSA decided to press ahead and complete the development of C9, albeit with modifications to allow the use of shared parts with other PSA models. The Simca double wishbone front suspension gave way to MacPherson struts adopted from the Peugeot 505 and 604, and the rear axle was replaced with that of the 505, much narrower than the one originally planned, as it was designed with respect to the 505 body width, and thus compromised the C9's stance as the rear wheels were now badly inset within their arches. The C9 front end was extended to accommodate the optional PRV engine: now that the model belonged to PSA, using the PRV presented no problems.

== Short market life ==
Following the renaming of Chrysler Europe's models to the Talbot marque, the C9 was christened the Talbot Tagora, and the first batch of cars rolled out of the former Simca plant in Poissy in 1980. The same year, PSA presented the Tagora at the Salon de l'Automobile in Paris. Following a hands-on demonstration of the model to the press in Morocco in March 1981, the car went on sale in France in April and in the United Kingdom in May. The British billboard advertising campaign boasted "The new Talbot Tagora. Luxury and performance redefined."

The Tagora was priced to overlap with high-end Peugeot 505 and low-end Citroën CX models, while slotting in beneath the Peugeot 604. Its pricing was also comparable to the Renault 20/30 and Ford Granada. The Tagora was in the 20,000–30,000 Deutsch Mark bracket in Germany. During the first fifteen months of the car's existence, in 1980/81, a mere 16,169 Tagoras were produced which was only one quarter of Chrysler's initial projections. Sales proved insufficient even for this production level, and volumes plummeted by more than 80 percent in 1982. In 1983 the sales figures prompted PSA to cancel the model altogether. By the time the Tagora was discontinued, only about 19,500 had been built; by comparison, over 116,000 Peugeot 505s and 74,000 Citroën CXs were made in 1981 alone.

In December 2010, Practical Classics reported that 99.09 percent of all UK-registered Tagoras were no longer on the roads. The last UK-registered Tagora on the road, has been declared on a SORN (statutory off-road notice) since 2016. The last UK-registered Tagora has been put back on the road as of September 2022

== Powertrains and models ==
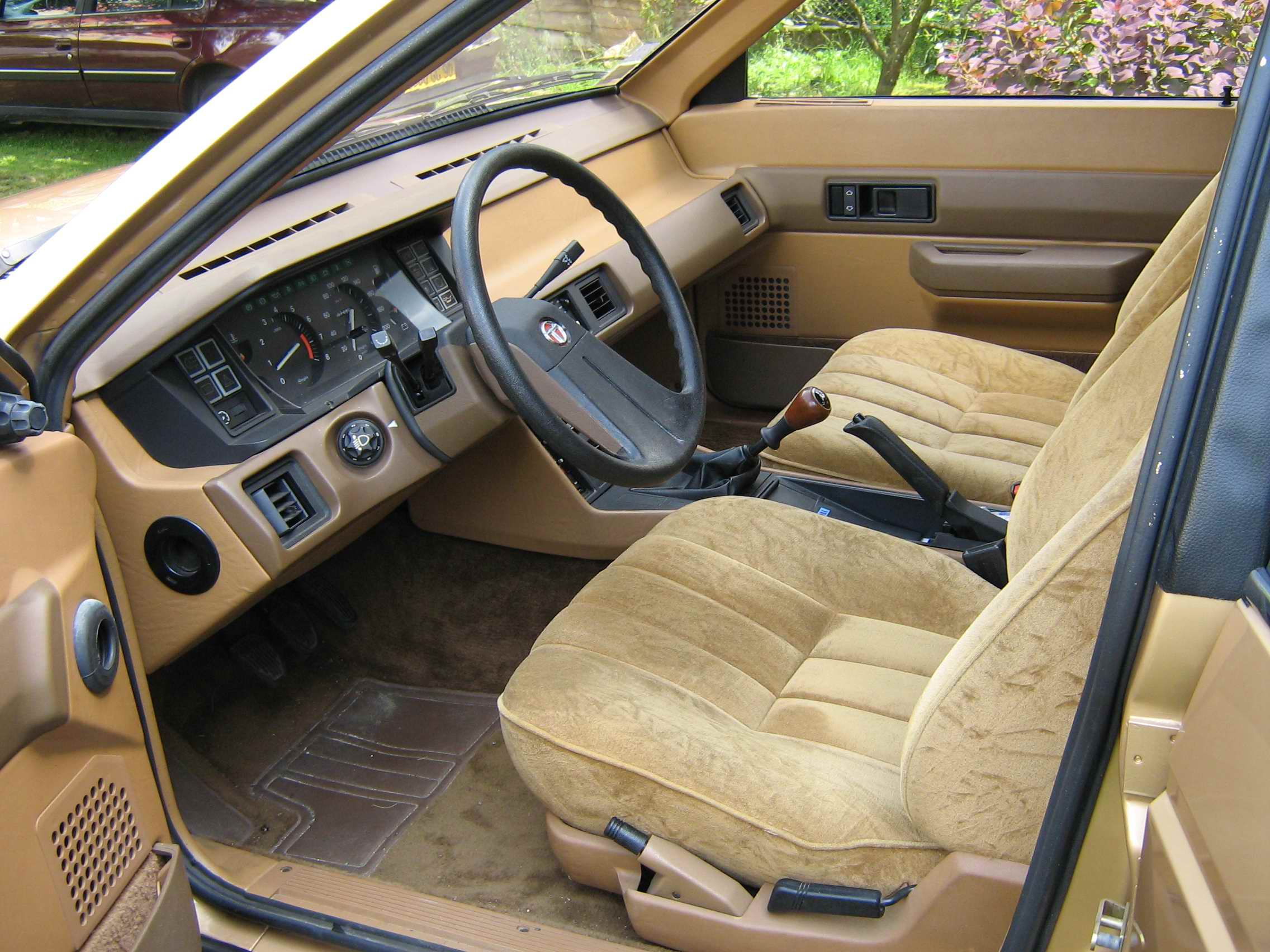
Interior of a Tagora SX 2.6

As with most large cars of its time, the Tagora was a rear-wheel drive vehicle, with a longitudinally mounted engine. There were three engine choices, mated to four- and five-speed manual transmissions or an optional three-speed automatic in the case of the four-cylinder engines.

The available models were:

- 2.2-litre (2155 cc) Type 180 OHC I4, double-barrel Solex carburettor, 115 metric horsepower (85 kW), 184 newton-metres (136 lbf⋅ft).

The base engine was a version of the older Simca Type 180 2.0-litre with increased displacement, as also featured in the Matra Murena. It was unrelated to either the American Chrysler K or PSA Douvrin 2.2-litre engines. Available trim levels were designated GL and GLS. The GL was the only model to feature the four-speed manual transmission, and have power steering as an option as opposed to standard. It was first to be dropped, for the 1983 model year.

- 2.3-litre (2304 cc) XD2S OHV turbodiesel I4, 80 metric horsepower (59 kW), 188 newton-metres (139 lbf⋅ft).

This Peugeot-developed turbodiesel was primarily used in the Peugeot 505 and 604. The diesel-powered version of the Tagora was designated DT.

- 2.7-litre (2664 cc) PRV OHC V6, two triple-barrel Weber carburettors, 166 metric horsepower (122 kW), 234 newton-metres (173 lbf⋅ft).

The V6 model, which was actually badged "2.6", came in the top SX trim level, loaded with extras, but was not available with automatic transmission. The PRV engine used in the Tagora was different from the one used in contemporary Peugeot vehicles in that it was fitted with triple-barrel Weber carburettors rather than fuel injection, resulting in a higher power-rating. This made it the most powerful French car of its time. Nevertheless, only 1,083 V6 Tagora models were made.

=== Tagora Présidence ===
The Tagora Présidence was a concept car designed by stylist Sunny Atri at the Talbot design studio in Whitley, Coventry. The concept was created to generate interest in employing high-end Tagoras as chauffeur-driven limousines by users such as business executives and government officials. The donor model for the Présidence was the 2.6 SX, which had an interior appointed with Connolly Leather upholstery and brass highlights, plus a host of electronics including a telephone, dictaphone, text-message receiver, and television with VCR. Originally valued at £25,000, the Présidence now resides at a car museum in Poissy.

== Critical appraisal ==
The Tagora was not greeted with much acclaim by the British motoring press. Autocar reviewed the Tagora in its 2.2 litre GLS iteration, and summed it up as "excellent, if not a great advance". L. J. K. Setright of Car magazine asked who could want one given the crowded market into which it came. Concluding a group test in Car, the Tagora was described as a "problematic newcomer" that did not exceed the standard set by the winner of the group test, the Volvo 244 GLE. However, Motor Sport considered the Tagora a "usefully effortless, uncomplicated, simple-to-drive and very comfortable car".

The recurring theme of published tests was the Tagora's lack of clear advantages or of a competitive edge. In comparing the car to its likely competitors, Autocar's verdict was that "the new Talbot is highly comparable with the others, and deserves to sell as any of them, although it does not come out with any startling advantages which you might expect of the latest appearance on the scene". Those cars against which the Tagora 2.2 GLS was compared were the Ford Granada 2.3 GL, Opel Rekord 2.0S, Renault 20TX, Rover 2300 and Volvo 244 GL. Of these cars, the Tagora was the second most expensive but did not have a superiority among the significant attributes of speed, acceleration, interior room or chassis design. Out of the comparison group the Tagora had the second highest top speed, was the third fastest to 60 mph though it had the best overall mpg (by 0.7 mpg). In terms of interior room, it had the fourth best legroom (front/rear). Motor Sport also noted the car's modest competence in comparison with the Rover 2300 (launched 1976), saying that the Tagora had more leisurely acceleration. LJK Setright noted the cars's overall "adequacy" going on to say that if fitted with the correct type of tyre he would still opt for a Peugeot 604 instead. Car judged the chassis design to be one area "where [the Tagora] does not show the comparative youth of its design".

The Tagora's handling was deemed "on the good side", wrote Autocar, and performance was described as "good but not outstanding". As such the car lay "uneasily close to being listed as under-engined" though the authors conceded that generally the Tagora did not feel under-engined when in use. LJK Setright dissented saying the Tagora was as "refined in its ride as should be expected of it" and that "the car also has a good deal more road-holding and cornering than might be expected". However, in December 1981 Car magazine judged the car (2.2 GLS model) to be prone to "untidy" handling, tending to under-steer first followed by excessive over-steer. The magazine made a particular note of the advantage in handling and grip enjoyed by the older live-axled Volvo 244, underlining the point about the Tagora's lack of advantage in terms of road manners.

Regarding the interior, the seats drew praise for their comfort and detail design. However, again, Car provided a counterpoint to the effect that the Volvo was as roomy, despite its shorter wheelbase. The steering wheel was criticized in the same review for being too close to the driver's legs. The ventilation temperature control was "not satisfactory" due to an unprogressive response at the cool end of the dial. There was no fan-blown cold air (cold air was by ram-effect) nor an option for cool air to be directed to the face at the same time as warmth being directed into the footwells. According to Car the ventilation "fell down badly" on account of its awkward controls. Oddment accommodation was "disappointment". Lacking a self-setting stay, opening the bonnet was "heavy work" and the boot, while large, had the demerit of an "unusual" locking method: "[the boot] is locked before being shut by pushing in a red handle set in the inside of the lid".

In summary, the main competencies of the Tagora were its spacious cabin (though it was not class-leading), its comfortable seating, its fuel economy (in 2.2 GLS form) and the size of its luggage compartment (572 litres). But the fact that a car launched in 1974, the Volvo 244 GLE, could offer better seats, disc brakes all round, better headlights, better ventilation and better handling for only slightly more than Talbot was charging for their car indicated that the Tagora had come to market with a vehicle that was uncompetitive in too many major respects.

Nearly a decade after the Tagora had ceased production, the view of the car in the automotive press was that it was merely average though there was little actively wrong with the car. The view was that the Tagora had the advantage of refinement, good manners and, in V6 form, good performance. Rust was identified as the single biggest problem for the surviving cars, usually around the rear suspension mountings. Buckley suggested that the car might attain collectible status by 2003.

== Reasons for commercial failure ==
=== Market situation and image ===
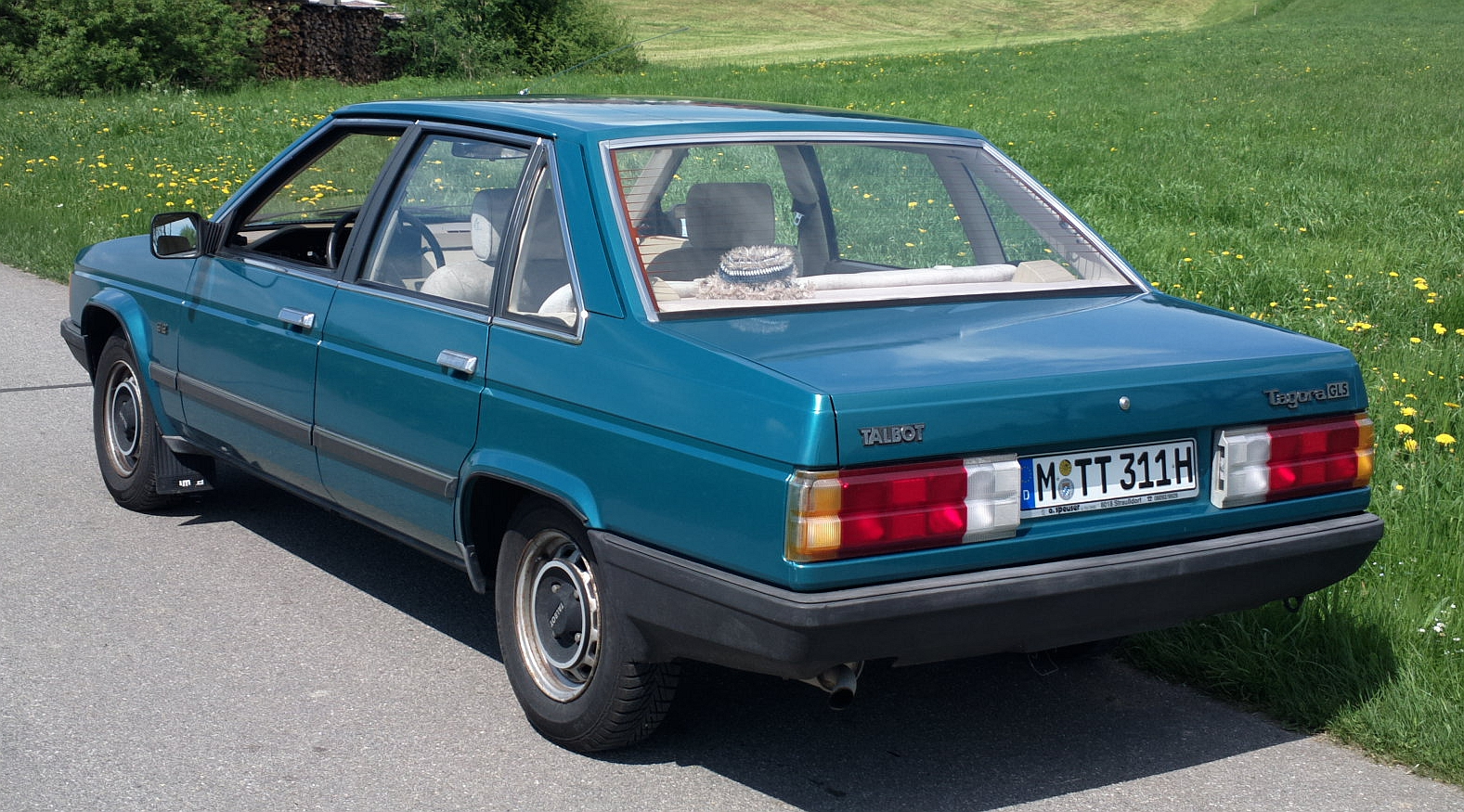
Rear view of 1981 2.2 GLS Tagora

In terms of engineering, the Tagora had no major flaws (except perhaps for the poor cabin ventilation). The 1979 energy crisis, however, dealt a blow to the European automotive market: the large car segment contracted significantly, making Chrysler's initial sales projections unrealistic. The Tagora was ultimately launched under the Talbot brand, which was not established in the marketplace and had a confused pedigree, putting the car at an immediate disadvantage in an executive car market dominated by well established offerings such as the Ford Granada. In the view of Martin Buckley Talbot did not advertise the car effectively so "people did not know about the car".

=== Design ===
As the British magazine What Car? opined, the Tagora "has such a complete blandness of style as to disqualify it instantly in a market where character and status count for so much." The design of the Tagora was focused on practicality, providing exceptional cabin space at the expense of style. The steep windscreen formed a quite strange angle with the relatively short, wedge-shaped bonnet. The car was wider and taller than most of its competitors, and buyers were unaccustomed to such proportions. The PSA-sourced axles had very narrow tracks relative to the width of the body, which provided an awkward look, especially at the rear. Nor did the plain, plastic dashboard stir enthusiasm among reviewers and prospective customers.
