= Chrysler Centura =

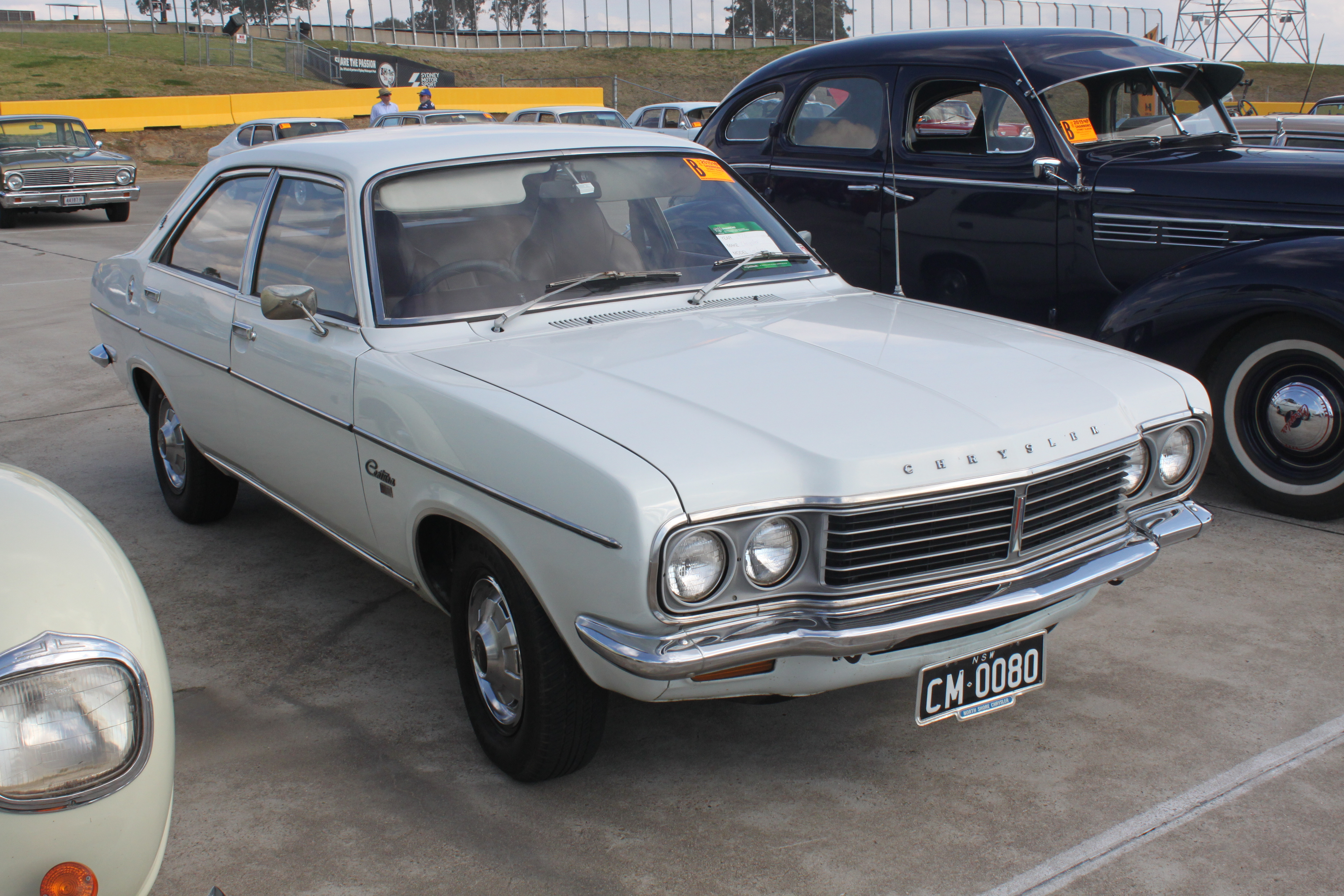
- 1975–1977 Chrysler Centura (KB) GL sedan

Overview
- Manufacturer: Chrysler Australia
- Production: March 1975–1978
- Assembly: Australia: Tonsley Park; 19,770 produced

Body and chassis
- Class: Mid-size car
- Body style: 4-door sedan
- Layout: Front-engine, rear-wheel drive
- Related: Chrysler 180

Powertrain
- Engine: 2.0 L Type 180 I4; 3.5 L Hemi I6; 4.0 L Hemi I6
- Transmission: 3/4-speed BorgWarner manual 3-speed BW-35 automatic

Dimensions
- Wheelbase: 2,660 mm (104.7 in)
- Length: 4,580 mm (180.3 in)
- Width: 1,730 mm (68.1 in)
- Height: 1,430 mm (56.3 in)
- Curb weight: 1,105–1,125 kg (2,436–2,480 lb)

Chronology
- Successor: Chrysler Sigma

The Chrysler Centura is a mid-size car which was produced by Chrysler Australia between 1975 and 1978. It was based on Chrysler Europe's Chrysler 180 model, but was also available with larger Australian-made Hemi Six engines. A total of 19,770 Centuras were built.

== Development ==
Engineers from Chrysler Australia and Simca considered modifying the body of a Chrysler 180 sedan and shortening the drive train so they could place the Australian 6-cylinder Hemi engines further back in the body but instead decided to lengthen the nose, as Chrysler Australia apparently felt this created a more aggressive and better-looking car. It also meant fewer changes were needed to "Australianise" the car, making it economical to assemble. Additional, largely cosmetic changes included a new grille, headlights, bonnet and rear panel and taillights.

A brake proportioning valve was fitted to all Centuras from factory to compensate for weight transfer during braking. When the car "nose-dived" under heavy braking, a mechanical link connected to the proportioning valve reduced the brake pressure on the rear wheels, to prevent them from locking up and causing the back of the car to slide around. This was typical of many European cars of the time but uncommon in Australian cars.

Chrysler also experimented with fitting a 5.2-litre (318 ci) American-made V8 but decided that the body lacked the rigidity to cope with the larger engine; the V8 version never went into production.

== KB Centura (1975–1977) ==
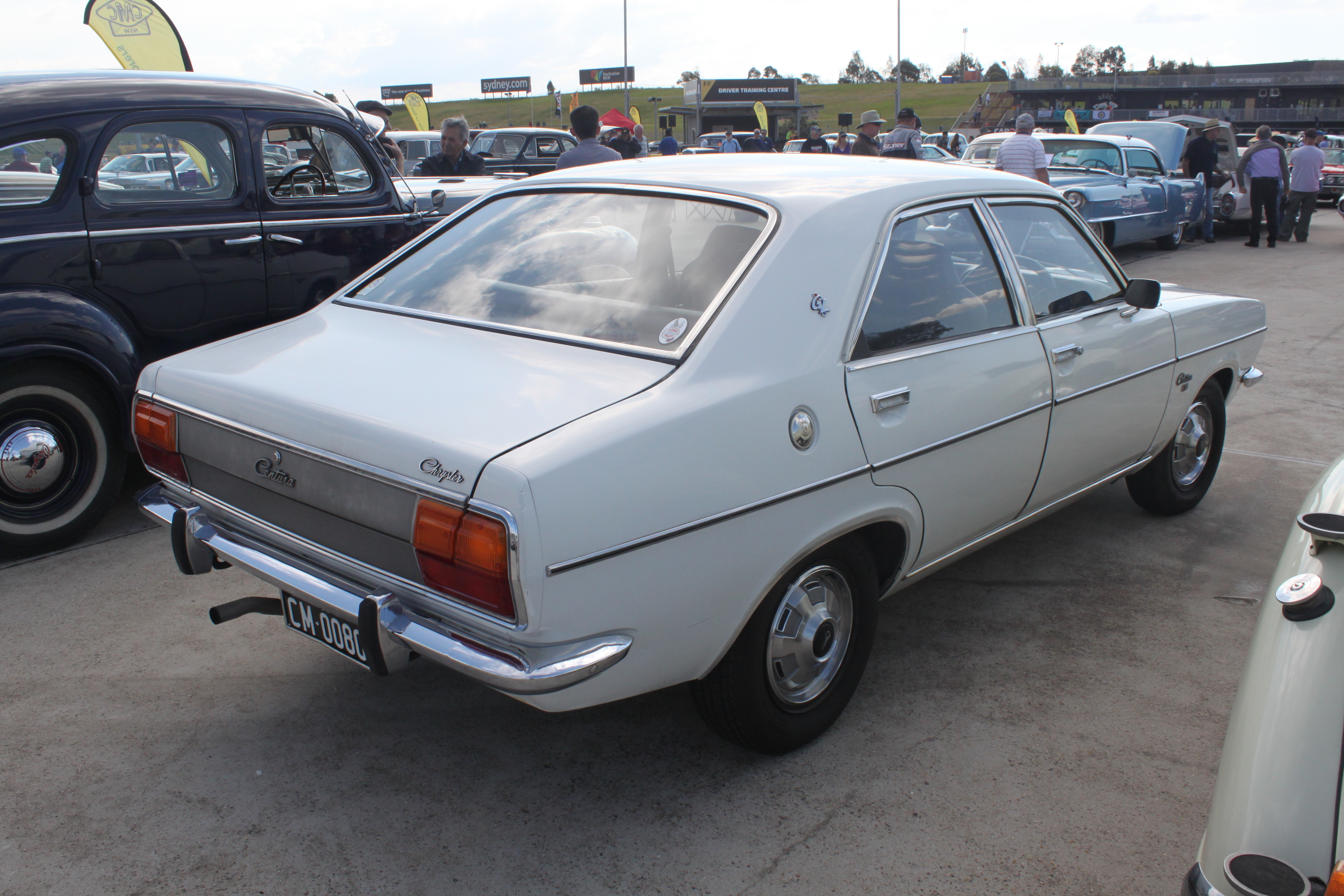
Chrysler Centura (KB) GL

The KB Centuras sold and assembled in Australia not only had a 1981 cc version of the four-cylinder Simca engine but were also available with Australian-made 6-cylinder pushrod 3523/4014 cc hemi engines and BorgWarner 3-speed automatic and 3- or 4-speed manual gearboxes. The four offered 122 hp (SAE), the sixes 142/167 hp (SAE) respectively. The KB series was sold in XL and GL trims, the latter having more equipment as standard. All KB Centuras had a tachometer and a clock, low fuel light (rare for 1975), rear bumper overriders, console (no storage) and optional vinyl roofs. There were no rear demister fitted, although a Smiths unit was fitted by some dealers. The KB model's European pedigree was obvious, with instrumentation in the opposite order and steering column controls on opposite sides. All KB Centuras came equipped with a tachometer as standard (whereas later KC cars only gained a tachometer through special order- as part of the Sports Pack option package) Interior flow ventilation was improved compared to the larger Valiant models, as the Centura had two face-level ventilation outlets. Although the A55 6 cylinder Centura Sports Package was fitted to some vehicles (included body stripes, styled wheels, woodgrain instrument cluster and Boca Raton cloth trim), it was common to see dealer fitted options including the styled road wheel option, and stencilled side stripes and bonnet black outs. The sixes also came with larger brakes (279 mm (11.0 in) ventilated front discs and 228.6 mm (9.0 in) rear finned drums) and a tandem brake reservoir. The six-cylinder Hemi cars used a 5-stud wheel bolt pattern, and the early four-cylinder cars used a 4-stud wheel bolt pattern and only featured solid unventilated brake discs. Later four-cylinder cars shared the same brakes and stud pattern as the sixes, and thus the same wheels. All Centura models were factory fitted with rack-and-pinion steering, however there was no power steering option. Steering could be extremely heavy, so correct tyre fitment and pressures were a must. Factory / dealer fitted air, with the unit located below the heater controls was available but seldom optioned.

=== Problems ===
No Centura models were fitted with starter motor relays, which instead put the cranking load onto the ignition switch internal terminals when cranking, which reduced the ignition switch life in some cars. Traction in wet weather proved to be poor, with some cars only having an open differential, relatively large six-cylinder Hemi engine and very light weight over the rear wheels.

The importation of the bodies from France into Australia was complicated in 1973 by industrial action, with dockside unions protesting against French Pacific island nuclear testing. The union bans lasted 2 years. There was a myth that many early KB bodies spent months on wharfs exposed to salt air, creating corrosion problems later in these cars' lives. This was not the case. The main problem this caused was to delay the car's initial release onto the market.

Centuras overall are generally not very rust-prone compared to contemporary vehicles of the time, however rust tends to occur in the usual places where moisture and mud tend to accumulate. Areas to check are below the windscreen on both sides of the car, the firewall where the heater is mounted, and the lower sills, especially behind the back wheels and below the front doors. The vinyl roof cover which was a popular and standard fitment on GL models (delete option only) was also a source of water entrapment, creating the possibility of rust in the "A" pillars and gutters. KC models were more prone to rusting than KB models. This can be attributed to the KC panels being made in Australia from different steel than the KB's imported panels.

In addition to the union bans on French imports, parts supply and local Chrysler support for used vehicles also became more complicated when in 1978, Chrysler Europe went bankrupt and was taken over by Peugeot. This Peugeot takeover was soon followed by several French Peugeot/Talbot factory strikes worsening the problems in sourcing parts in Australia. The mix of metric and imperial fasteners used on the 6-cylinder cars is not anything unusual as many contemporary cars such as Holden Commodores had the same mix. The combination of overseas and Australian parts can make them challenging vehicles to maintain, however most wearing components are readily available from spare-parts suppliers. From the early 1980s parts became difficult to source, with existing stocks being used up and with the wait for French parts sometimes a long one. In the early 1990s Mitsubishi ceased supporting these vehicles with spare parts. Existing stocks of spare parts were auctioned off, and all stock which wasn't sold was unfortunately disposed of.

=== In the market ===
Six-cylinder cars sold four-to-one in the Australian market over the four-cylinder cars. They had a reputation for providing reasonably decent handling, outstanding torque and outstanding acceleration. Sports options available on Centura models included dealer-fitted stenciled sports stripes (bonnet and sides), special 'Boca-Raton' striped cloth seats and styled steel or alloy wheels. Most of the interior and exterior dealer options from the larger Valiant models were applicable to the Centura, from the dealership.

The Centura's main competitors in Australia were four- and six-cylinder Australian-made versions of the Ford Cortina and General Motors' LH, LX and UC Holden Torana and Sunbird. The Centura had much more interior room and boot space than these main rivals, along with a far more violent power-to-weight ratio. Centuras were also seen to compete to a lesser extent with larger-bodied Australian Holdens, Chrysler Valiants (including the sporting Charger coupe) and Ford Falcons. Most competitors, although often lacking the outright fierce acceleration of the six-cylinder Centura, proved less rust-prone and generally had more modern styling. In retrospect the rather compact Centura was not a typical 1970s medium-sized car. It wouldn't be until after the cancellation of the Centura, when Holden released the Commodore in October 1978, for the market to have a vehicle with similar internal dimensions to the Centura.

Chrysler Australia was being starved of funds by its troubled American parent at this time, leaving the larger Valiant sedans persisting with the same chassis platform and basic body shape and interior (Valiants did not have face-level flow-through vents, unlike those in the Centura) for many years. This created an old-fashioned image of the Australian Chrysler-Valiant brand that may have also adversely impacted Centura sales. The Chrysler 180 design was also rather dated by the time the cars arrived in the Australian market (later than intended), further adding to the old-fashioned image of the brand. The bigger Valiants were still popular with rural Australians, who seemed to prefer larger cars, but the Centura didn't have the size or perceived style to meet the needs of that market, either.

== KC Centura (1977–1978) ==
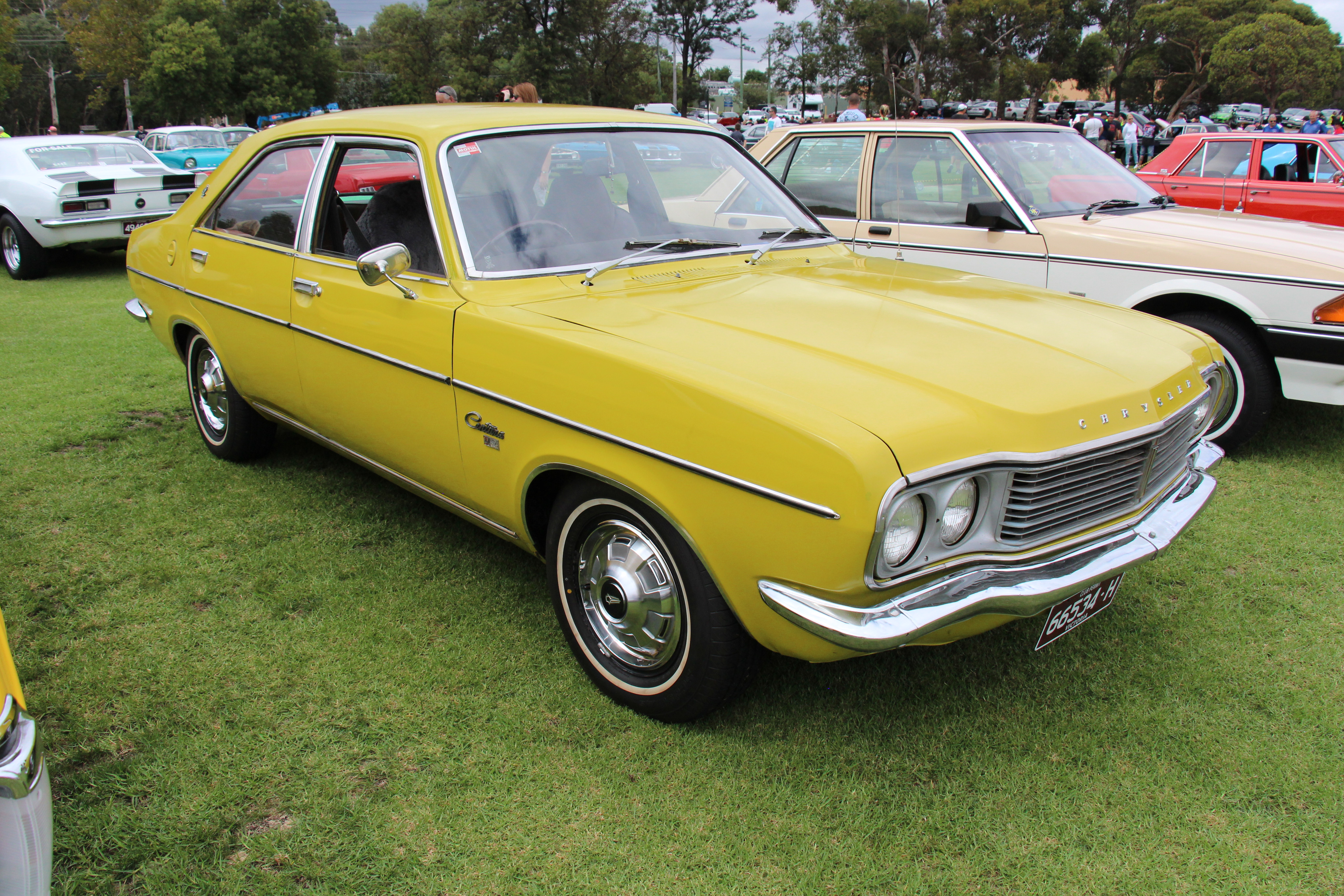
Chrysler Centura (KC) GL

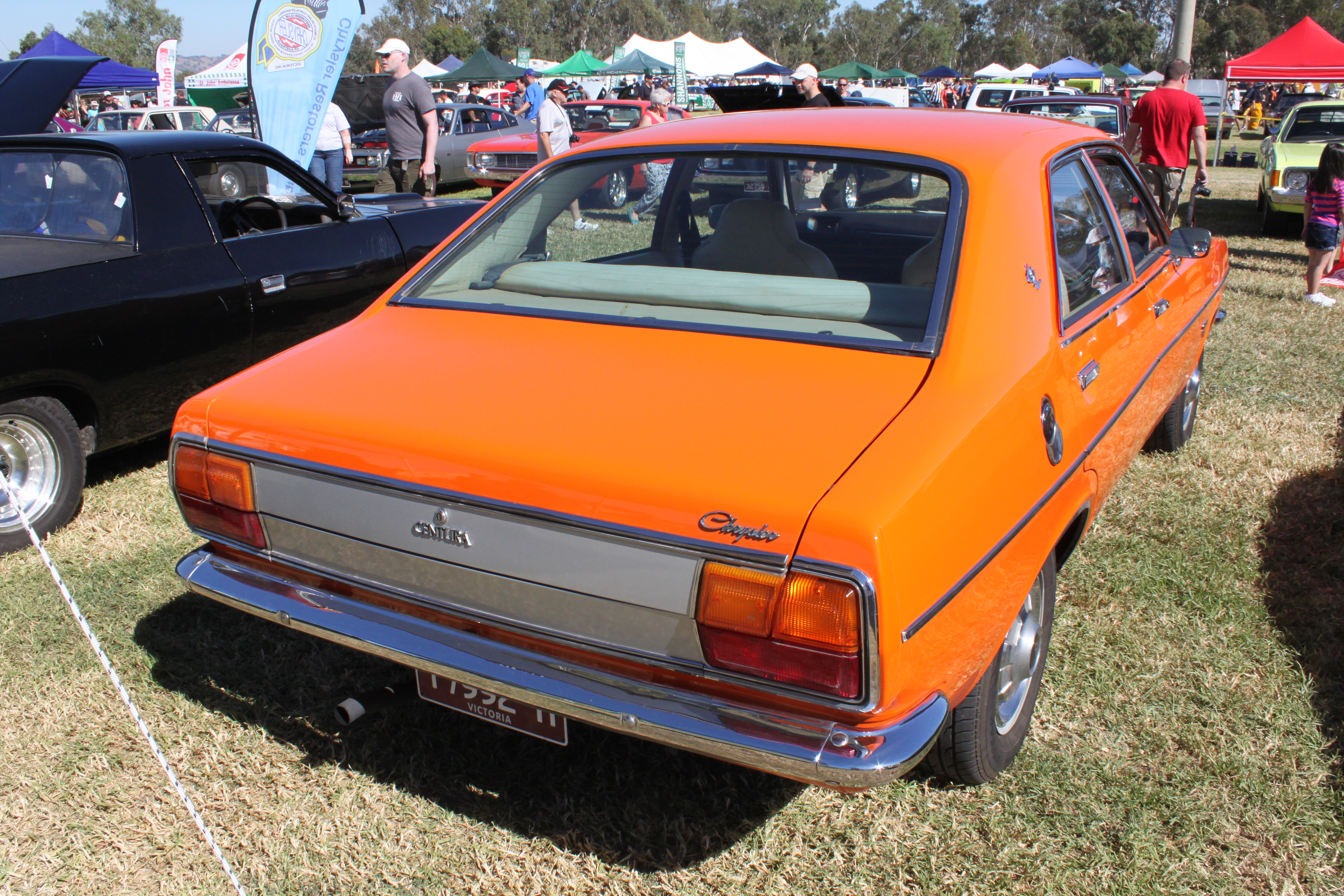
Chrysler Centura (KC) GL

The KC model (from June 1977 to the end of 1978) series dropped the 2.0 and 3.5 engines, but retained the larger 4.0-litre Hemi. The 4.0-litre comprised a low-compression (7.6:1) Hemi engine which ran on standard-grade fuel and aided fuel economy, and a high-compression two-barrel (9.0:1) version of the Hemi for greater performance and towing ability. The KC also featured greater Australian content, using VDO gauges (tachometer now an optional extra available only on Sports Pack KC, replacing the factory fitted KC clock), a Valiant-style steering wheel, steering column and various other parts from the larger Australian Valiant lineup. The KC was offered in GL or luxury GLX trims, along with the addition of sports package options which could also be ordered.

KC models could be differentiated by the use of capitalised and serifed block lettering typeface for the "Centura" badges (the KB had this in cursive) and a silver grille insert (KBs had a black grille with a silver border and highlights).

By 1979, the Centura had been replaced by the four-cylinder Chrysler Sigma, of Mitsubishi origins.

== Centuras today ==
Centuras are now very rare on Australian roads, although they appear slightly more common in South Australia. This is probably due to an enduring local loyalty to the Chrysler brand, as they had a manufacturing plant in that state before selling it to Mitsubishi in 1980. The nuclear ban's impact on production and parts supply, subsequent rust problems, extreme light weight over the rear of the car, comparatively violent acceleration and challenging handling were likely all factors that contributed to their relatively rapid disappearance from Australian roads.
