= Simca Ariane =

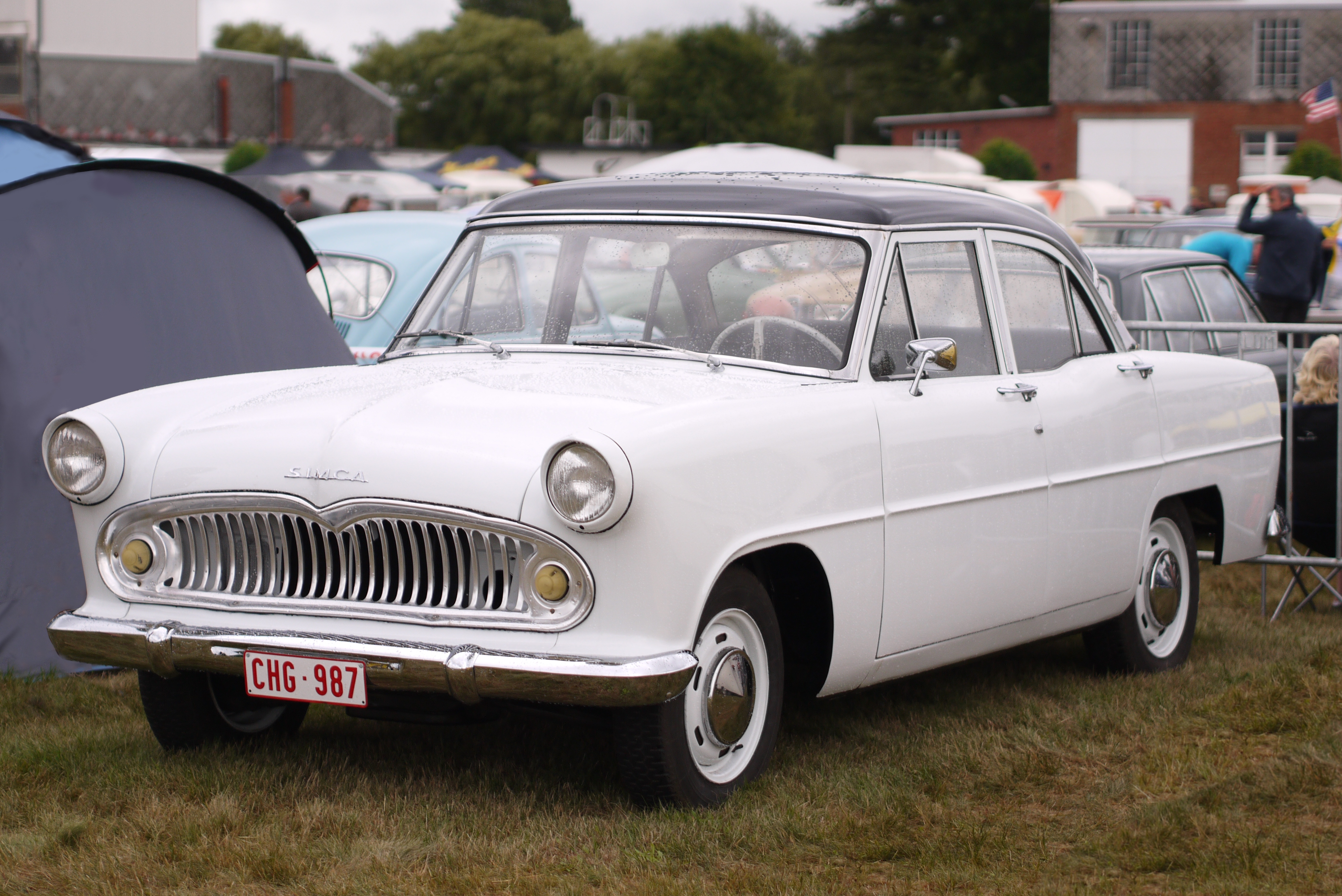

Overview
- Manufacturer: Simca
- Also called: Simca Miramas (1961–1963)
- Production: 1957–1963
- Assembly: France: Poissy, Yvelines (Poissy Plant)

Body and chassis
- Class: Large family car
- Body style: 4-door saloon
- Layout: FR layout
- Related: Ford Vedette; Simca Vedette; Simca / Chrysler Esplanada

Powertrain
- Engine: 1.3 L Flash I4 (1957 - 1963); 2.4 L Aquillon V8 (1958 - 1961)
- Transmission: 4-speed manual. Synchromesh on top 3 ratios

Dimensions
- Wheelbase: 2,690 mm (105.9 in)
- Length: 4,500 mm (177.2 in)
- Width: 1,750 mm (68.9 in)
- Height: 1,480 mm (58.3 in)

Chronology
- Successor: Simca 1300/1500

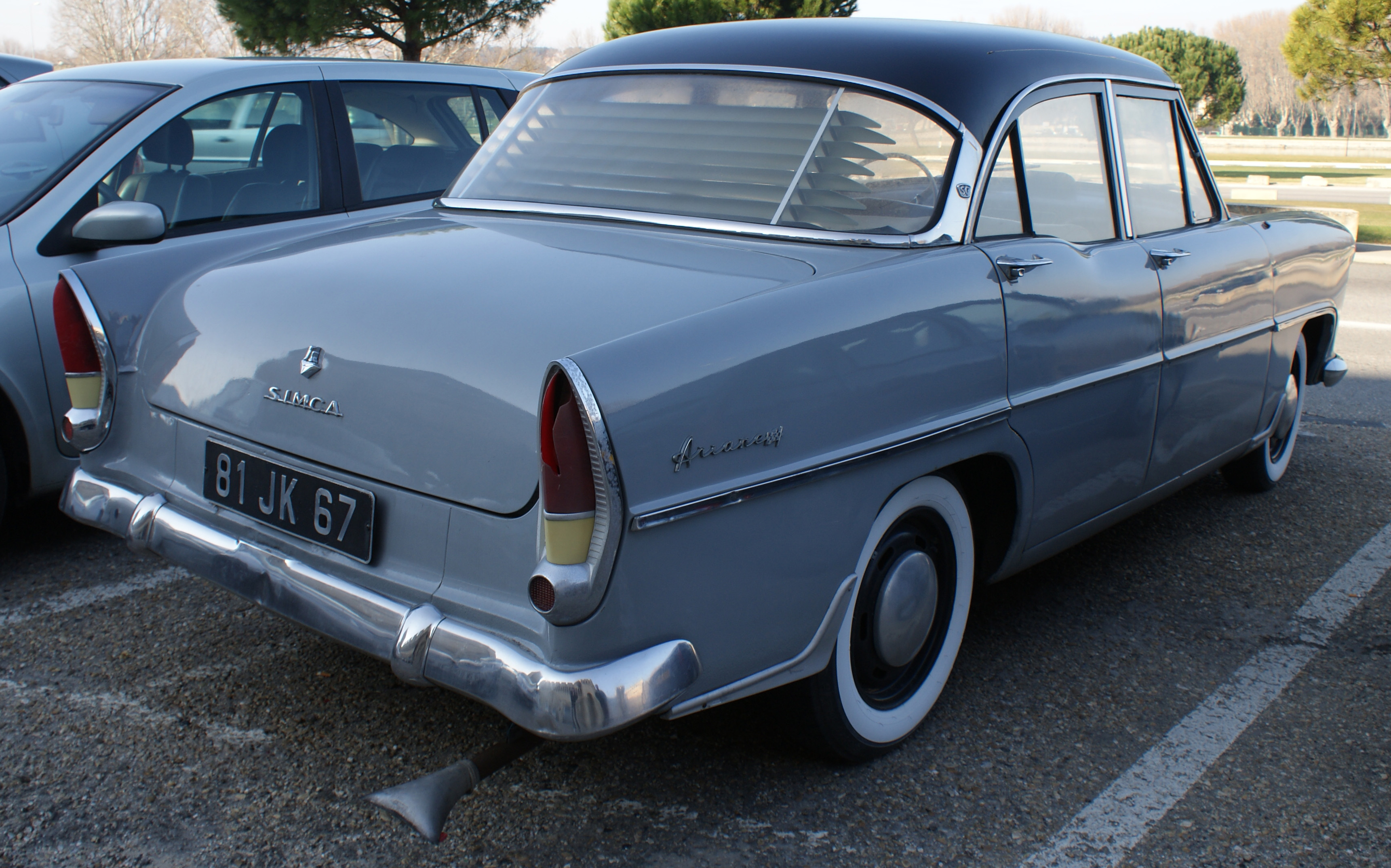
Simca Ariane, rear view. The increased height of the fins incorporating the tail-light clusters identify this example as a car produced during or after 1959.

The Simca Ariane is a large saloon car launched in April 1957 by the French automaker Simca and manufactured in the company's factory at Poissy until 1963.

== Origins ==
The plant at Poissy had been built by Ford France between 1937 and 1940, but after the war the economic direction of France was uncertain. Ford had equipped the plant to produce the V8 engined Ford Vedette but the government was imposing punitive levels of car tax on cars with large engines and sales fell well short of expectations. In addition, the Poissy plant experienced above average levels of industrial unrest. Simca purchased the plant from Ford in 1954, together with rights to build the latest version of the car produced in it, which now became the Simca Vedette, relaunched by Simca with different model names according to equipment levels.

The Simca Vedette competed in France's large car market at a time when the economy was finally returning to growth, and enjoyed moderate success with their fashionably American style finished off by an Italian designer called Luigi Rapi. In 1954 the big Simcas competed in France against the Citroën Traction which was still popular despite its twenty-year-old design and the Renault Frégate which struggled to find buyers thanks to a poor mechanical reputation and, it was suggested, from the reluctance of France's haute-bourgeoisie to buy a big expensive car from a state owned enterprise.

The Suez Crisis of October 1956 was a catalyst that undermined the position of the V8 Simcas, however, due to the fuel shortages and price increases that it triggered. By this time domestic competition was in any case much intensified by the arrival of the Citroen DS which, despite getting off to a slow start, and despite being stuck with an engine design that had changed little since the 1930s, now became increasingly dominant in France's market for large family cars.

It was often asserted that the Simca Ariane's launch was a direct result of the Suez Crisis, but it is now clear that by 1956 Simca's project for a big car with a little engine ("une grande voiture à petit moteur") had already existed for several years. The urgency of the project was increased in the summer of 1956 when the Simca chief learned of a plan by the Minister for Economy and Finance (Paul Ramadier) and a still influential former Prime Minister, to introduce an additional annual car tax for owners of cars with larger engines in December 1956. The Suez crisis simply built on the economic case for a small engined version of the car, and Simca was therefore ready to respond very nimbly to the changed circumstances created by the crisis, fitting a 1290cc "Flash" series engine from their successful small family car, the Aronde, into the most basic version of their V8 engined Simca Trianon, which was one of the models in the Vedette range. The new car was badged as the "Simca Ariane" and was soon available in several versions.

== The car ==
Fitting the body of the former first-generation Simca Vedette with a 1290 cc (7 CV) Flash four cylinder engine from the much smaller Simca Aronde produced a car that focused on economy rather than speedy acceleration. Presented in April 1957, the Ariane filled the gap between Aronde and Vedette. In October of the same year, the Ariane 8 was presented - a version powered by the same Aquillon 2351 cc (13CV) V8 unit that powered the Vedette. The Ariane 8 effectively replaced the former Simca Trianon, which was a bottom-of-the-range Vedette, as the Vedette range was moved upmarket. The Ariane 8 would be discontinued along with the company's other V8 powered models in 1961, however.

For the 1959 model year the company introduced an Ariane Super Luxe with increased levels of chrome trim on the outside as well as vanity mirrors on the inside and a windscreen washer to help the view out. All the Arianes also received restyled tail light clusters at this point which resembled those already used on the more flamboyantly styled but broadly similar Vedette models. Further upgrades to the interior trim were implemented for 1961, and newly available options included bench seats that could now be folded flat to form a double bed of sorts. There followed yet another new name: for the final two years of its life the Ariane was branded as the Simca Miramas.

== Commercial ==
The Ariane was manufactured until 1963, with 166,363 produced. Towards the end, production slowed strikingly. 33,733 Arianes were produced in 1961, which slumped to just 14,284 during 1962. By this time attention at the company's Poissy plant had switched to the new Simca 1000. The most direct replacement for the Simca Ariane/Miramas would be the Simca 1300/1500, introduced in 1963.

== Argentina ==
The "Simca Ariane Miramas" was made in Argentina by Metalmecánica. 507 units were reported to have been built until 1967, in two versions: "Standard" and "Lujo" (deluxe).
