= Simca Esplanada =

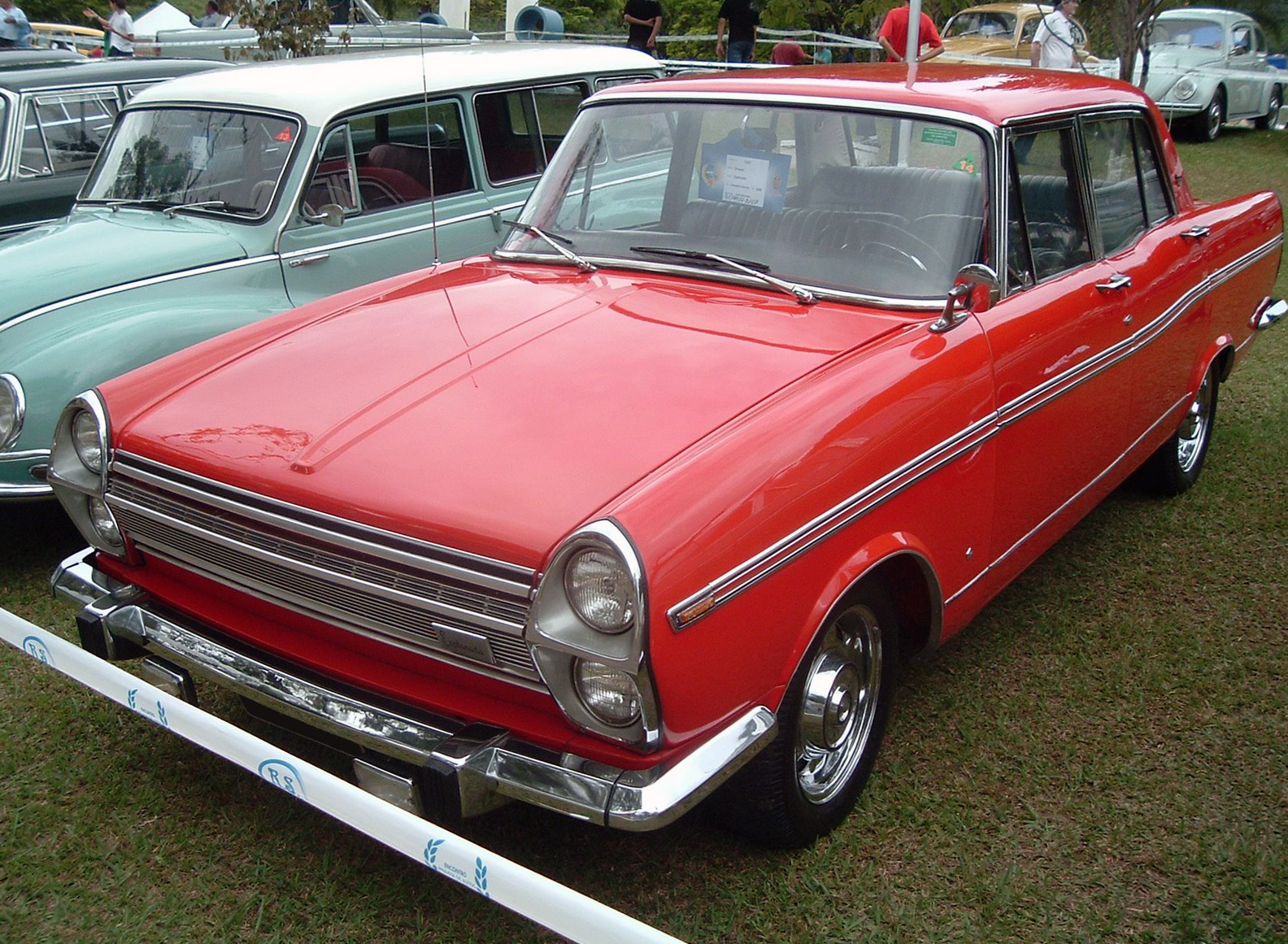
- 1968–1969 Chrysler Esplanada

Overview
- Manufacturer: Simca do Brasil (1966–1967); Chrysler do Brasil (1967–1969)
- Also called: Simca Regente; Chrysler Esplanada (1968–1969); Chrysler GTX
- Production: 1966–1969
- Assembly: Brazil: São Bernardo do Campo

Body and chassis
- Class: Executive car (E)
- Body style: 4-door saloon
- Layout: FR layout

Powertrain
- Engine: 2,414 cc (147 cu in) Emi-Sul V8; 2,515 cc (153 cu in) Emi-Sul V8
- Transmission: 3-speed manual

Dimensions
- Wheelbase: 2,690 mm (105.9 in)
- Length: 4,720 mm (185.8 in)
- Width: 1,770 mm (69.7 in)
- Height: 1,450 mm (57.1 in)
- Kerb weight: 1,390 kg (3,064 lb)

Chronology
- Predecessor: Simca Chambord
- Successor: Dodge Dart

The Simca Esplanada is a large car manufactured by Simca do Brasil in Brazil from 1966 to 1969. It was manufactured at Simca do Brasil's São Bernardo do Campo factory. Launched at the 1966 Salão do Automóvel in São Paulo, it replaced the Simca Chambord and related models. The basic platform of the Esplanada can be traced back through the French-built Simca Vedette to the Ford Vedette. The Emi-Sul engine was derived from the Ford Motor Company flathead V8 of 1932, thanks to the use of Zora Arkus-Duntov's "Ardun" hemispherical cylinder heads. This iteration was the last version of that design to be built for a production car.

== Design ==
Though the Chambord's engine and central section were retained, the Esplanada featured radically restyled front and rear ends. The interior featured reclinable leather seats and fine Jacarandá wood trimmings on dashboard and doors. The 140 hp (104 kW; 142 PS) engine now was fed by an electric fuel pump and featured a 34-Ampère alternator. The 6M trim featured an overdrive that operated on all three gears of the standard transmission, and was marketed as a six-speed.

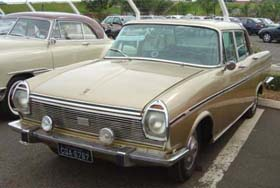
Pre-facelift (1966–1968) Esplanada

From August 1967 on, the Simca Esplanadas featured a small badge at the rear end with the writing "fabricado pela Chrysler" ("built by Chrysler") following the takeover of Simca and Simca do Brasil by the American auto manufacturer in April. After sending a copy of the Esplanada to Detroit for review and testing, changes dictated by Chrysler headquarters lead to improvements for 53 mechanical details being introduced in April 1968. The car's appearance was also updated with quad headlamps, a new grille, new tail lights, and new interior details. The 2.5-litre version of the Emi-Sul engine was discontinued in favor of a 2.4-litre version due to a spate of crankshaft failures; this engine had only 130 hp (97 kW; 132 PS). The significant mechanical improvements allowed Chrysler the confidence offer a novel 2-year or 36,000 km (22,369 mi) warranty.

A lower-specification version of the Esplanada called the Simca Regente was introduced in 1966.

In 1968 a sporty version of the Esplanada called the Chrysler GTX was introduced at the Salão do Automóvel in São Paulo. It offered a standard four-speed transmission, bucket seats, and larger wheels.

The production of the Esplanada, the Regente, and the GTX ceased in 1969 when Chrysler introduced the larger Dodge Dart to the Brazilian market.

== Production data ==
- Esplanada - 12,040
- Regente - 4,778
- GTX - 631
- Total production - 17,449 cars
