= Leidart =

Late 1930's British Automobile

The Leidart was an automobile manufactured by Leidart Cars Ltd in Pontefact, Yorkshire between 1936 and 1938. The name was a combination of the cars creators, Leith and Huddart, and was typical of the Anglo-American hybrids that were being manufactured in the United Kingdom at this time. The Leidart used a Ford V8 engine in an English chassis, with a combination of 2-seater and 4-seater open bodies.

Production was minimal, and may have only been the prototype, which featured extensively in press announcements of the time.
