= Pigozzi =

Pigozzi is a surname. Notable people with the surname include:

- Henri Pigozzi (1898–1964), car merchant and industrialist
- Jean Pigozzi (born 1952), Italian businessman, art collector, philanthropist, and photographer
- Luciano Pigozzi (1927-2008), Italian actor
