= Simca Vedette =

1950s–1960s French car

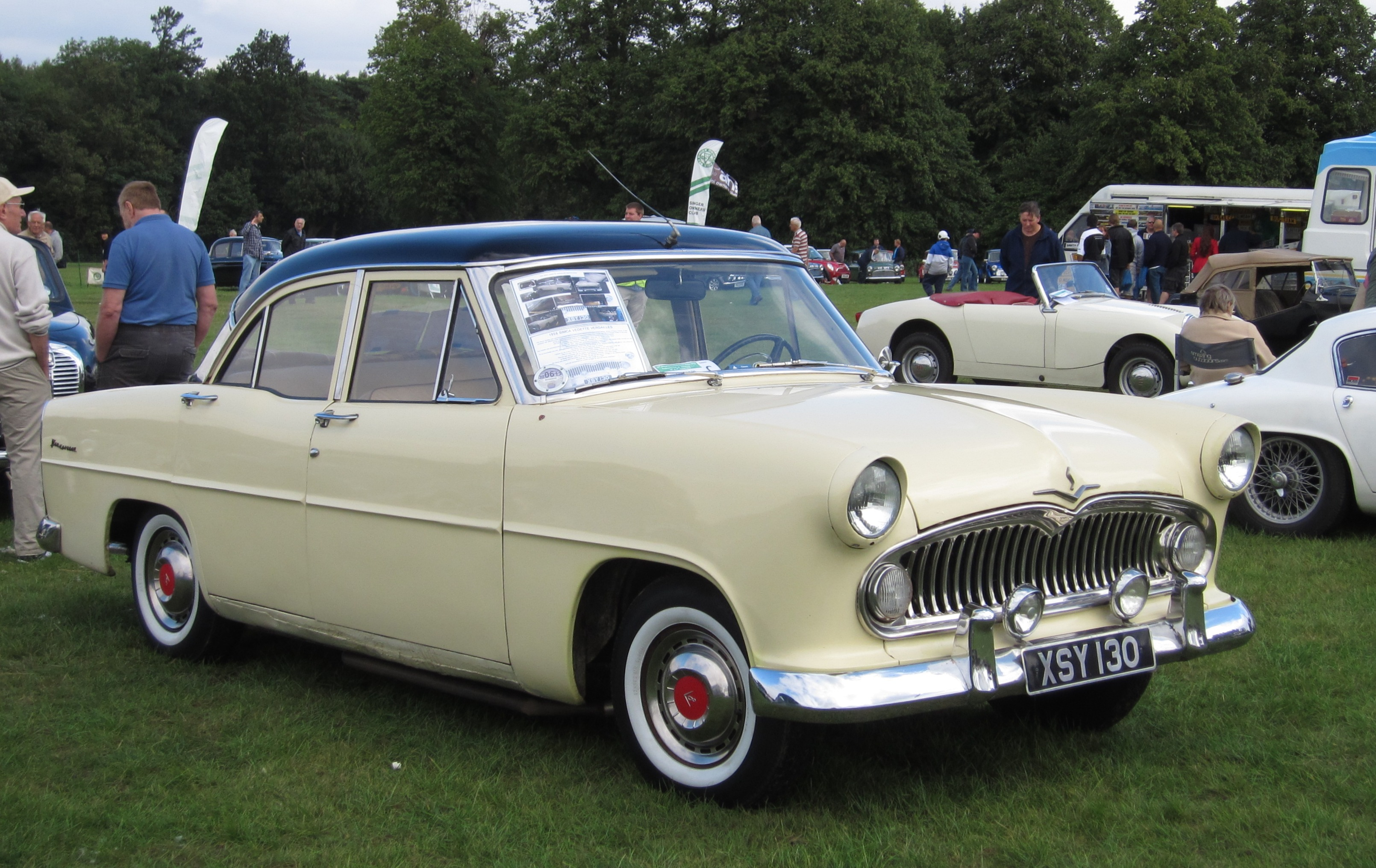
- A 1956 Simca Versailles V8

Overview
- Manufacturer: Simca
- Also called: Ford Vedette
- Production: 1954–1961 (France); 1959–1966 (Brazil)
- Assembly: France: Poissy, Yvelines (Poissy Plant); Australia: Adelaide (Chrysler Australia); Brazil: São Bernardo do Campo (Simca do Brasil)

Body and chassis
- Class: Executive car (E)
- Body style: 4-door saloon 5-door estate
- Layout: FR layout
- Related: Ford Vedette; Simca Ariane; Simca Esplanada; Dongfeng CA71

Powertrain
- Engine: 2.4 L Aquilon sv V8
- Transmission: 3-speed manual Rush-Matic automatic

Chronology
- Predecessor: Ford Vedette
- Successor: Chrysler 160, 180, and 2 Litre

The Simca Vedette is an executive car, manufactured from 1954 to 1961 by French automaker Simca, at their factory in Poissy, France. The Vedette competed in France's large car market at a time when the economy was finally returning to growth and enjoyed moderate success with its American style finished off by the Italian designer Rapi. It was marketed with different model names according to trim and equipment levels. The Vedette was Simca's largest model at that time, and it went on to spawn a more economical version, the Simca Ariane.

Simca acquired the Poissy factory from Ford France (Ford Société Anonyme Française, the French subsidiary of the Ford Motor Company), along with the model line, in 1954. The Vedette was therefore initially still marketed as the Ford Vedette. The Vedette was manufactured in Poissy until 1961 and the Ariane until 1963. After that, production continued in Brazil until 1966, when the Vedette finally evolved into the Simca Esplanada following Simca's takeover by Chrysler.

== Origins and launch ==
In the early 1950s, Henri Théodore Pigozzi was looking to expand the manufacturing operations of his Simca company, which was enjoying much success at the time, thanks to the popular Aronde. At the same time, Ford was seeking to divest itself of its French subsidiary, Ford SAF, which had a factory in Poissy, close to Paris, where it had been manufacturing a large car called the Ford Vedette. The Poissy plant was large and there was capacity for further expansion. The Vedette was a larger car than anything that Simca had on offer at that time. These points attracted Pigozzi, who decided to take over the entire factory, along with the rights to the cars manufactured there.

The cars appeared at the Paris Motor Show in October 1954 on the Ford France stand, but there was no mention of the Ford name on the covers of the brochures offered to potential customers. The name "Ford" appeared just once, in very small print, on the final page, presumably in order to avoid confusing customers who would be expected to call the cars "Simcas" from 1 December 1954, the date set for the formal hand-over of the business. In export markets the name change was less immediate, and even in adjacent Belgium, in January 1955 at the Brussels Motor Show the cars were still appearing on the stand of the Belgian Ford importer, sharing the space with models imported from Ford of Britain.

== First generation ==
First generation
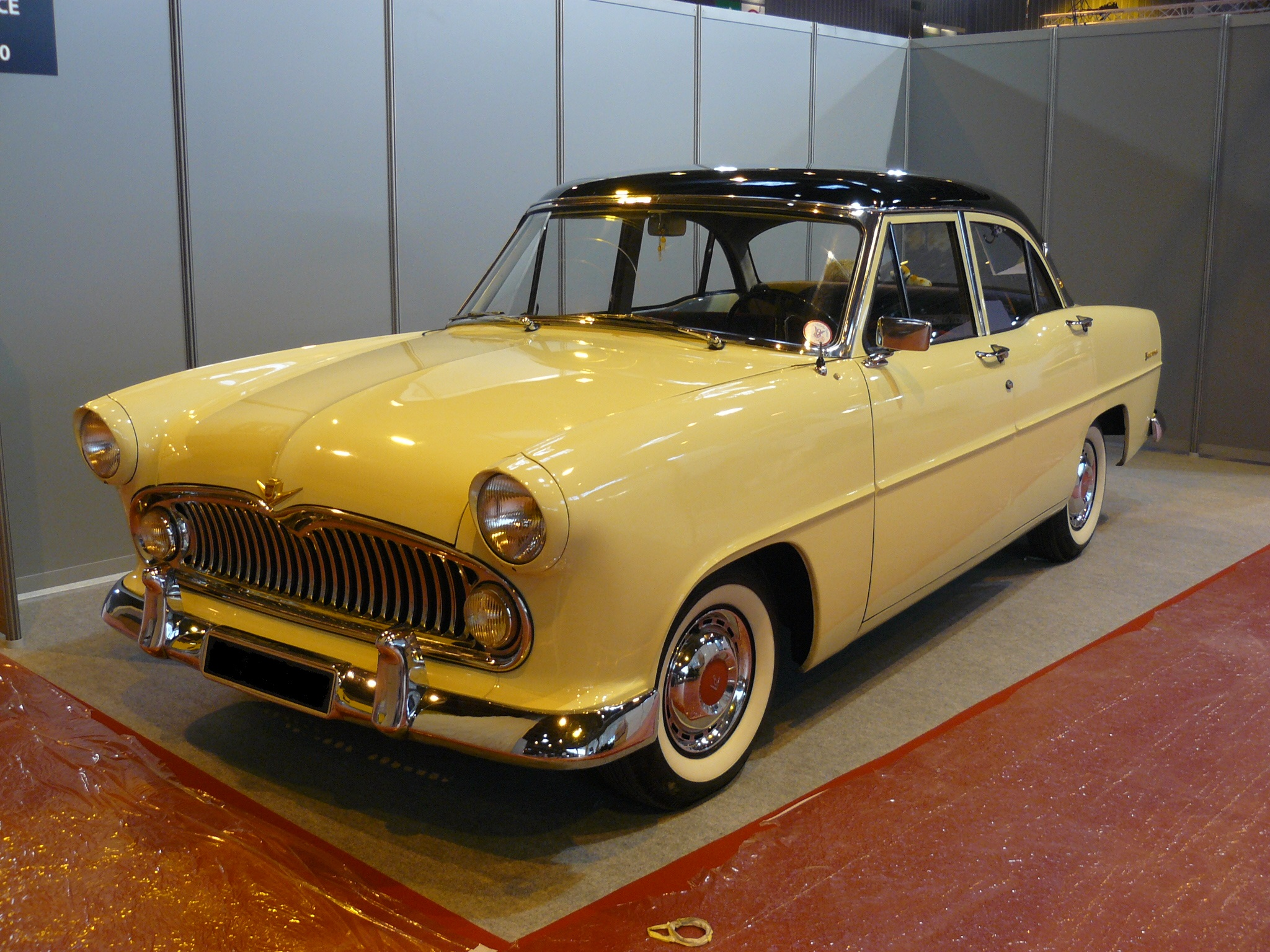
- 1957 Simca Versailles

Overview
- Also called: Simca Trianon; Simca Versailles; Simca Régence; Simca Marly
- Production: 1954–1957

Dimensions
- Wheelbase: 2,690 mm (105.9 in)
- Length: 4,520 mm (178.0 in)
- Width: 1,750 mm (68.9 in)
- Height: 1,480 mm (58.3 in)
- Curb weight: 1,150 kg (2,540 lb)

The acquisition by Pigozzi took place in July 1954, just when Ford was poised to launch its new, modern Vedette, with a four-door saloon body of "American" style, much like the contemporary British Fords or Vauxhalls. The car was powered by an unusually small 2351 cc sidevalve V8 engine called Aquilon ("North wind") in France, derived from Ford's Flathead engine family, whose displacement positioned the car into the "13 CV" French tax class. Equipped with a two-barrel Zenith-Stromberg 32NX carburetor, it produced 75 hp (55 kW) for the first generation. Power was transferred to the rear live axle through a three-speed manual transmission with column shift. The Vedette had independent front suspension (by MacPherson struts) and drum brakes on all four wheels.

As with the Aronde, Simca marketed different trim levels of the Vedette under different model names, this time with references to the grand period of baroque in French history. The basic version was called the Simca Vedette Trianon, the mid-level was the Simca Vedette Versailles and, at the top of the range, the Simca Vedette Régence. An option on all versions was a large glass moonroof that slid into the roof, called Vistadome The Vedette range was still marketed under the Ford brand in some markets, including the Netherlands and Germany, until 1956. As the new model caught on, Simca was able to increase production from the 150 daily achieved during Ford's ownership of the factory to 250 cars a day.

Pigozzi maintained a schedule of year-to-year model revisions, much like US manufacturers. For 1956, an estate version called the Simca Vedette Marly joined the line-up and the whole range was revised. A new license plate holder was added to the front bumper and the rear license plate now concealed the fuel tank filler. A peculiar addition was a pedal-operated windscreen washer, while other more ordinary changes included a second odometer, also known as a 'trip meter', for measuring partial distances. The Versailles and Régence were made even more comfortable with the addition of central armrests (Versailles in the rear only, Régence in front and rear), while the Trianon was simplified, losing bumper guards and chrome windscreen decor. In 1957, an option of the Gravina automatic clutch was added, along with better brakes and more direct steering. The Trianon regained the chrome decor around the windscreen, while the other models acquired slimmer tail lights and the front ornament was replaced with a new design. Fender-mounted V8 badges were introduced but, although the whole range featured the same V8 engine, the new badges appeared on the fenders of only the Régence and Marly.

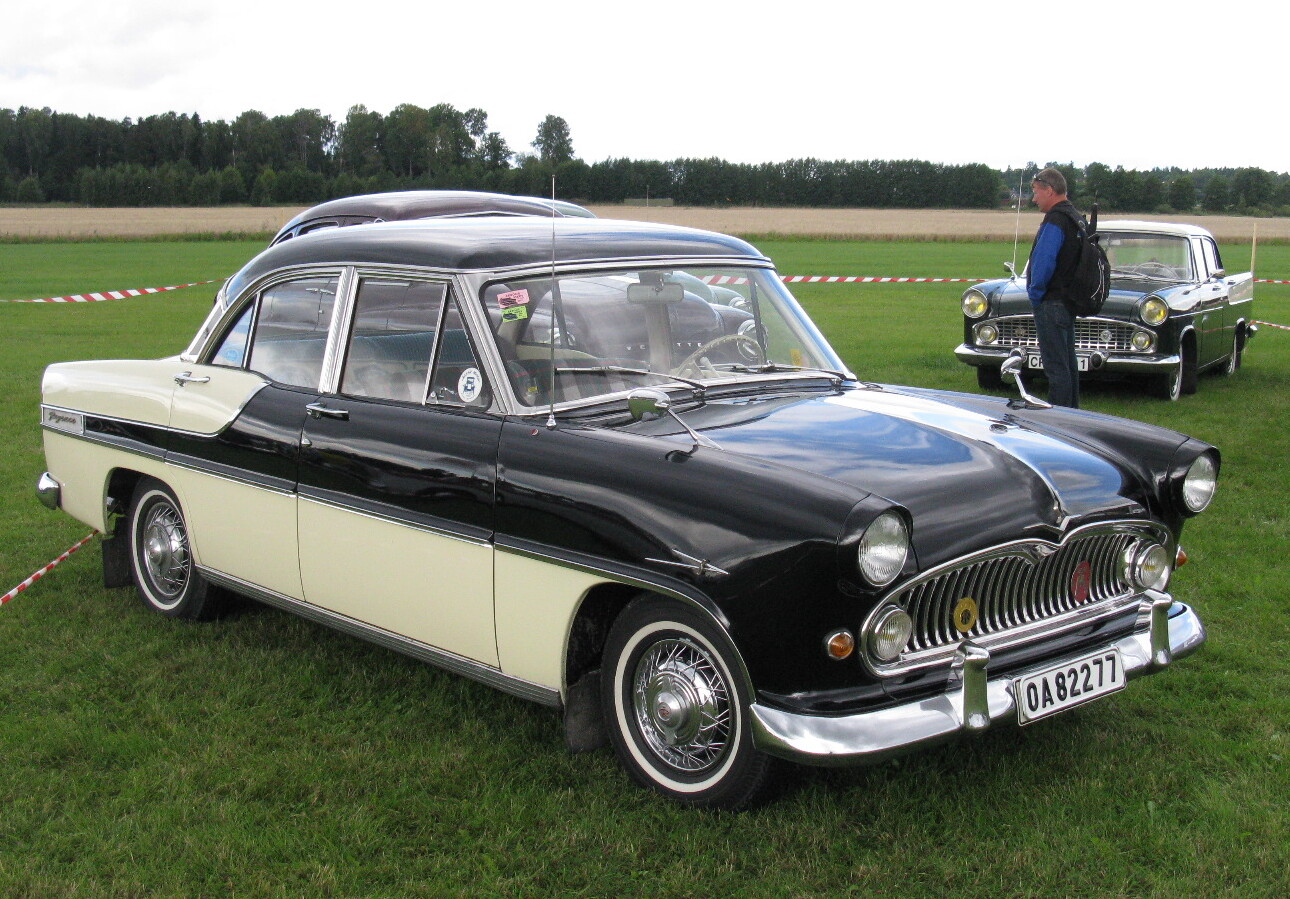
Simca Vedette Régence

=== Production figures ===
- 1955 – 42,439
- 1956 – 44,836
- 1957 – 17,875

== Second generation ==
Second generation
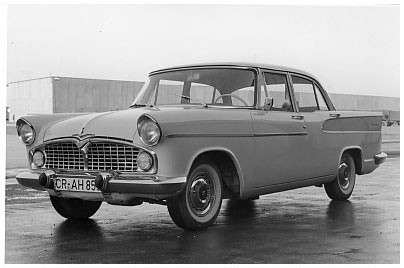
- 1960 Simca Vedette Beaulieu

Overview
- Also called: Simca Beaulieu; Simca Chambord; Simca Présidence; Simca Marly
- Production: 1958–1961; 1959–1966 (Brazil)

Dimensions
- Wheelbase: 2,690 mm (105.9 in)
- Length: 4,750 mm (187.0 in)
- Width: 1,770 mm (69.7 in)
- Height: 1,480 mm (58.3 in)
- Curb weight: 1,260 kg (2,780 lb)

After three years in production, the Vedettes were given new names and a new, elongated body, with a more ornate front end and large tailfins, making the cars even more American-looking than before. This was part of a styling trend shown by most large European cars of that period, which were, to some extent, inspired by American styling, as tailfins appeared on Peugeots, Fiats, BMC models (Pinin Farina-styled), Fords and even Mercedes-Benz cars of that era. The engine was uprated to 84 hp (62 kW) (now called Aquilon 84) but the fiscal qualification of the car remained unchanged. Using the new body, the Versailles was replaced by Simca Vedette Beaulieu and the Régence by the Chambord, while the estate retained the Vedette Marly name. The three-year-old body of the previous Vedette nevertheless continued in production but it lost its V8 2.4-litre engine. In April 1957, fitted with the 1.3 L Aronde engine, the old body now clothed a new model in the Simca range, the Simca Ariane.

1959 brought a new option, the Rush-Matic automatic transmission, which featured two modes: Rush (fully automatic) and Road (manual gear selection). The same year, assembly of the Vedette started at Simca do Brasil. Also during 1959, a new top-of-the-line model joined the Vedette range, the Présidence, featuring a luxurious interior, a radiotelephone (a European first) and a continental kit. French coachbuilder Chapron built two 2-door Présidence convertibles for a governor of one of the French colonies. Chapron had another order the next year, to build two four-door convertibles for the French President Charles de Gaulle. The Beaulieu was dropped in autumn 1960, but the other models remained unchanged until the 1961 model year, when they received new seats, new chrome decor, and the engine was fitted with a new anti-vibration crankshaft.

French production of the V8-engined cars ended in the summer of 1961, by which time 173,288 had been produced, although a Simca Chambord was exhibited at the Paris Motor Show in October of that year, suggesting that Simca still had some stock of the cars to clear. The small-engined 4-cylinder Ariane, of which 166,363 were produced, survived until 1963. Simca would not return to the luxury executive car market in Europe until 1970, when production of the Chrysler 160, 180, and 2 Litre started.

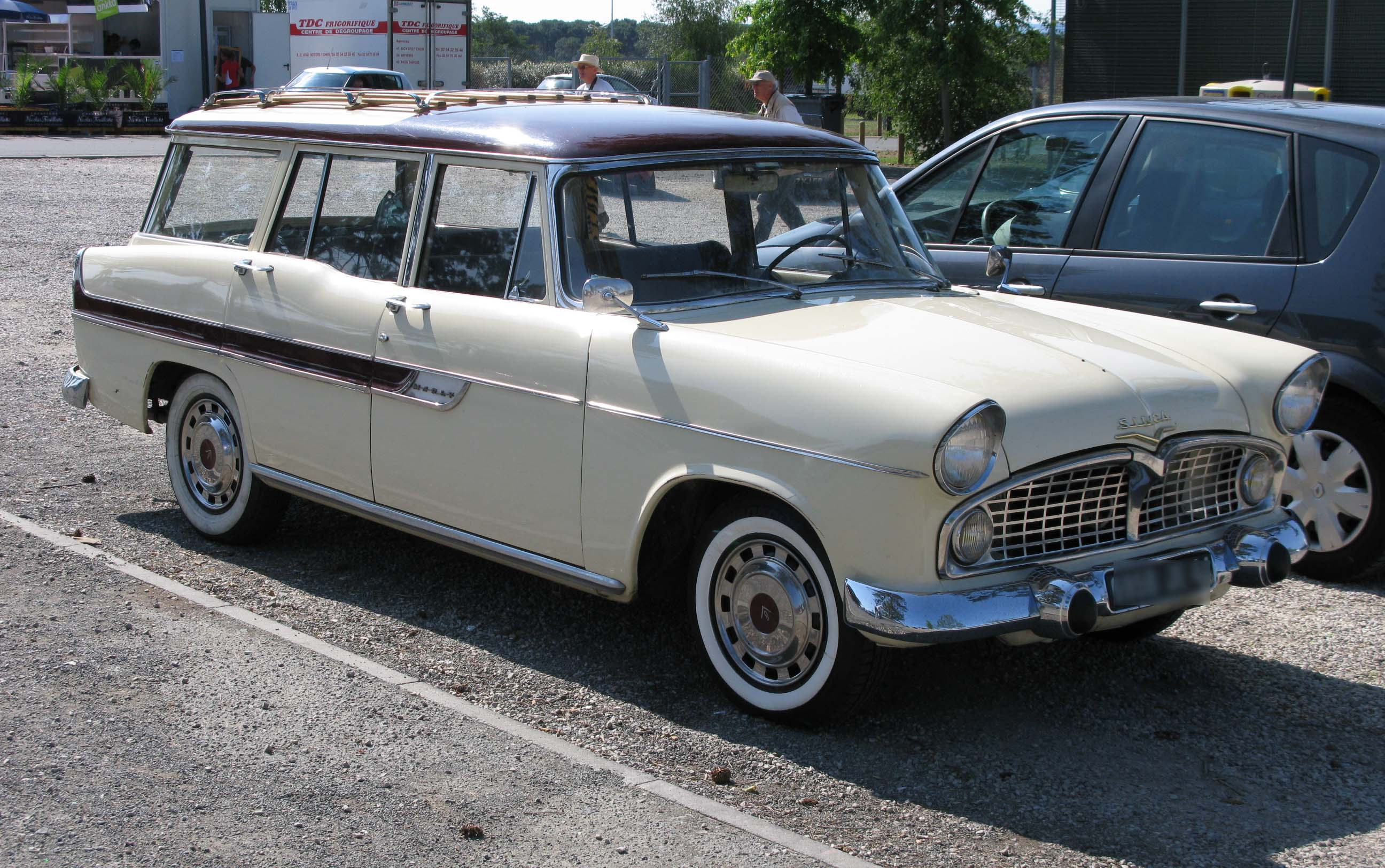
Simca Vedette Marly

=== Production figures ===
- 1958 – 28,142
- 1959 – 15,966
- 1960 – 13,914
- 1961 – 3,813

== Models (Brazilian market) ==
Simca Chambord
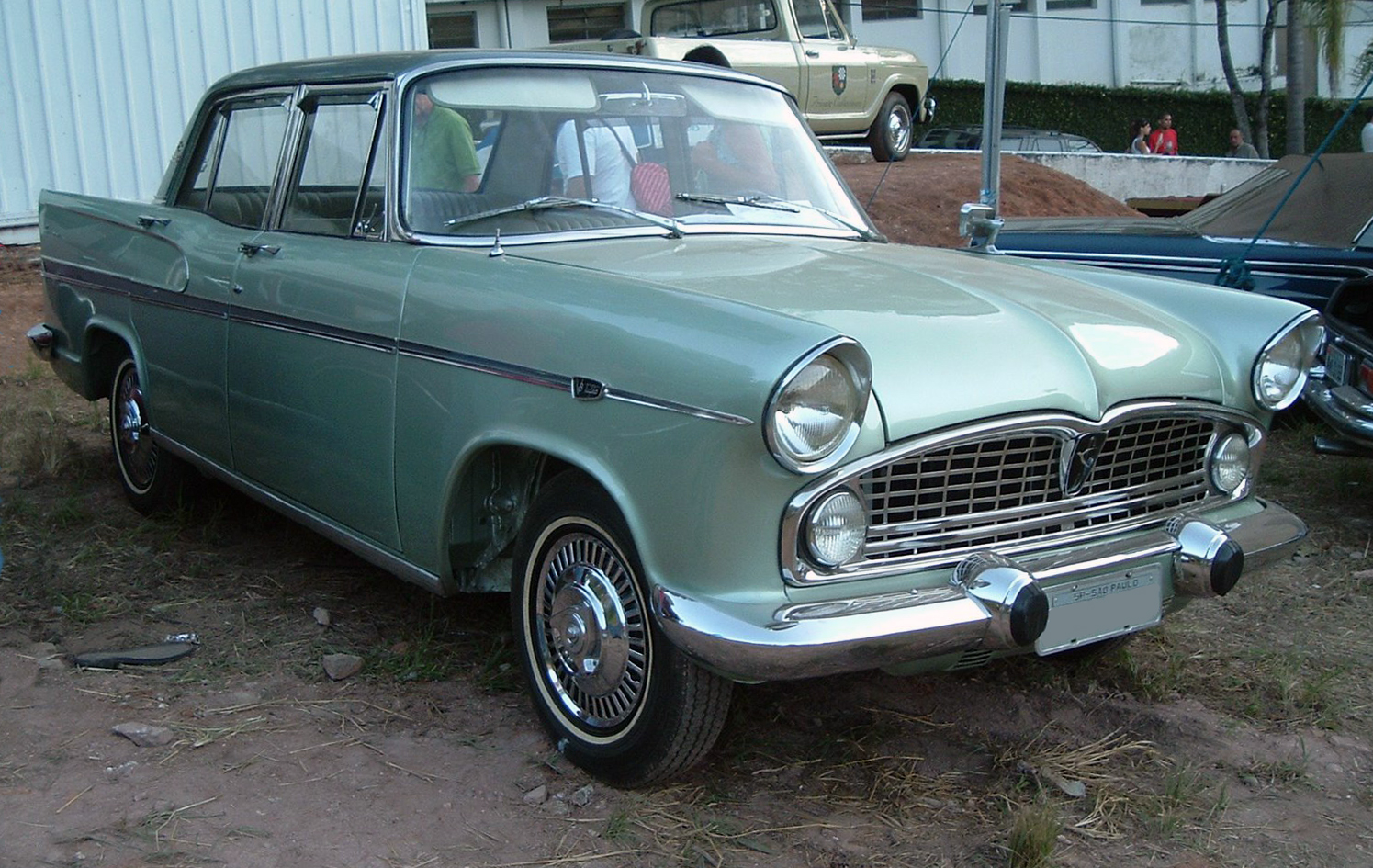
- Simca Chambord

Overview
- Manufacturer: Simca do Brasil
- Also called: Simca Présidence; Simca Rallye; Simca Jangada; Simca Alvorada; Simca Profissional
- Production: 1959–1966

Body and chassis
- Class: Executive car (E)
- Body style: 4-door saloon 5-door estate
- Layout: FR layout

Powertrain
- Engine: 2.4 L Aquilon V8
- Transmission: 3-speed manual

Dimensions
- Wheelbase: 2,690 mm (105.9 in)
- Length: 4,750 mm (187.0 in)
- Width: 1,770 mm (69.7 in)
- Height: 1,480 mm (58.3 in)
- Curb weight: 1,260 kg (2,778 lb)

Chronology
- Successor: Simca Esplanada

The model was continued for longer in Brazil, where it was the first V8-engined car to be built. The Ford-sourced Aquilon 2.4-litre V8 engine underwent a number of improvements, first increasing power to 100 hp (74 kW) (the Tufão version), then to 140 hp (103 kW) (called Emi-Sul due to its hemispherical combustion chambers, as used in Chrysler's Hemi engines). Trim levels included the Présidence as the top-end model, Chambord as the mainstream model and the Alvorada, later renamed Profissional, as a base model, mainly marketed towards taxi drivers. There was also the Jangada station wagon, based on the Marly. The cars were eventually replaced by a version with new sheetmetal, called the Simca Esplanada.

The Simca Chambord and its derivatives were built by Simca's Brazilian subsidiary, Simca do Brasil. Based on the Vedette, the first Brazilian Chambord left the production line in March 1959. It featured a standard 84 hp (62 kW) V8 engine, a 3-speed gearbox with the shifter located on the steering column. Early examples were assembled nearly entirely from parts imported from France. Related models included the Simca Présidence, Simca Rallye, Simca Jangada station wagon.

Throughout the 1960s, Simca do Brasil gradually introduced parts produced by local OEM parts suppliers. In 1961, the Chambord received an improved engine with 90 hp (66 kW) and 15% more torque, a slightly shorter differential. 98% of the parts were of Brazilian production. A special version, called the Tufão (whirlwind) featured some additional luxury items in its interior.

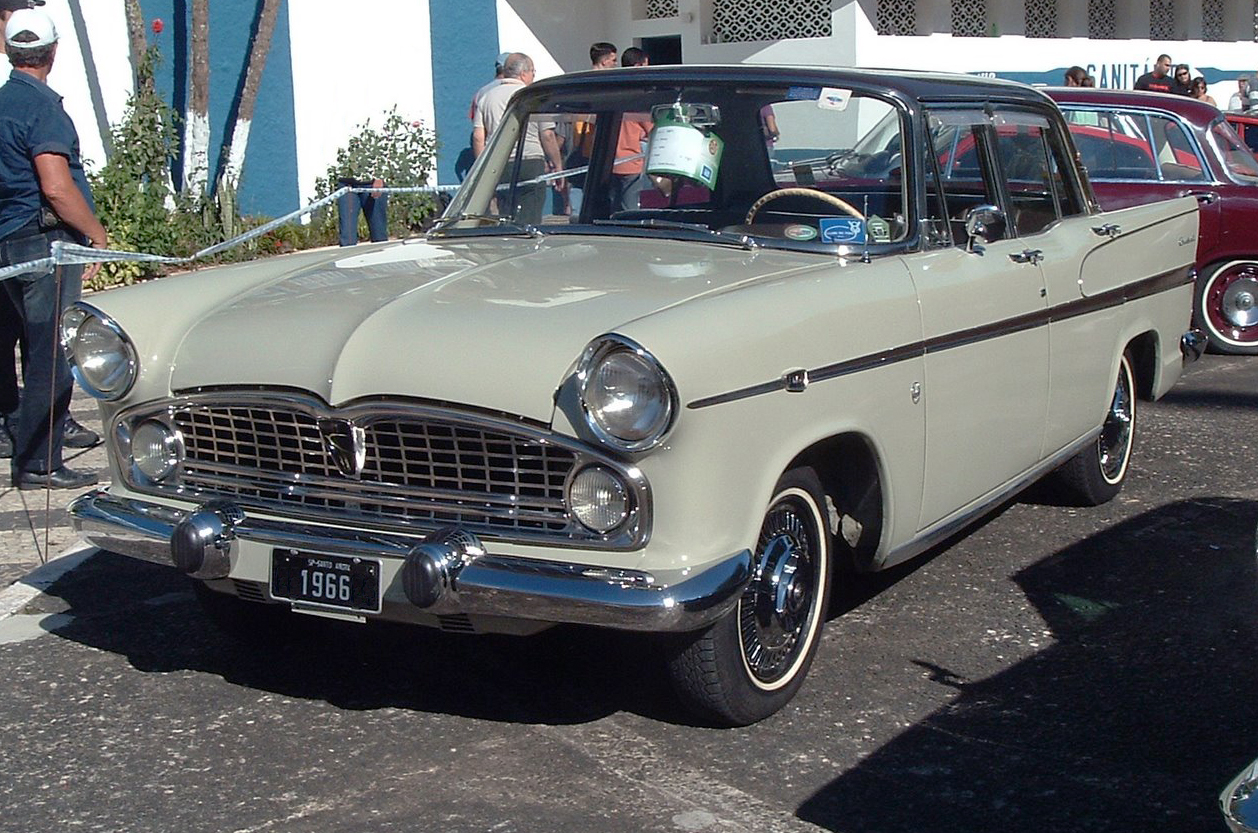
1966 Simca Tufão

42,910 units of the Chambord were built up to 1966, and the engine output gradually rose to 130 hp (96 kW). These more powerful Chambords had an acceleration from 0 to 100 km/h (62 mph) in 14.3 seconds and a top speed of 160 km/h (99 mph).

In November 1966 Simca introduced the Esplanada at the Salão do Automóvel, Brazil's sole motor show, as a replacement for the Chambord.

=== Simca Alvorada ===
The Simca Alvorada was a radically stripped-down version based on the posh Chambord as a result of a demand by the Brazilian government of President Juscelino Kubitschek that every car manufacturer must offer an affordable basic version within their range. The idea was to give as many Brazilians as possible the possibility to own a car. The concept of a very basic version of the Simca Vedette had been previously attempted in Simca's home country France, with the Simca Ariane.

While this was welcome news for Volkswagen, for example, Simca do Brasil was not exactly pleased with the idea as the brand had established itself comfortably in the luxury car sector, in a way that Simca back in Europe never managed. Having had no plans to launch a cheap car, with no other options available, Simca do Brasil reluctantly created an entry-level version of their successful Simca Chambord.

The Simca Alvorada appeared in 1963 with just two colours as option (grey and a faded yellow), no chrome, no trimmings, and a very simple interior. As a silent protest the car was named after the place the order to create this model came from: The Palácio da Alvorada, the presidential palace in the capital Brasília. The spartan car found very few takers, in spite of its lowered price, with only 378 examples built in the two years it was available.

=== Simca Profissional ===
The Simca Profissional succeeded the Simca Alvorada in 1965. That year, the Brazilian government created a new public financing tool through its publicly owned bank Caixa Econômica Federal that would allow Brazilians to finance their vehicle over four years with a monthly interest rate of 1%. This obviously was to attract a new range of clients and Simca do Brasil looked into how to reduce the Alvorada price in order to make it more attractive, for example for taxicab drivers.

The Simca Profissional thus appeared in 1965 with three colour options (yellow, green and cream white), no chrome (even the bumpers, grille and hubcaps were painted in dark gray, no trimmings), the already very simple interior of the Alvorada was downgraded further with eucatex seat covers, the door covers were dark, untrimmed cardboard screwed onto the metal. Also eliminated were the lid on the glove compartment, windshield washer, ventilation, ashtrays and carpet in the trunk. Under the hood, the oil cooler and manual ignition advance were deleted. The Profissional ended up 30 percent cheaper than its far posher brother, the all chrome and leather Chambord. The production numbers of this version were apparently never documented and, unlike the Alvorada, the Profissional had no distinct range of chassis numbers. Production figures are thus mixed in with those of the Chambord. The Profissional was discontinued in 1966, as the Chambord range was replaced by the new Esplanada.

Production (Brazil)

- Chambord – 42,910 (includes Profissional)
- Présidence – 848
- Rallye – 3,992
- Jangada – 2,705
- Alvorada – 378

Total: 50,833

== Australian production ==
Following an announcement in July 1959 that it would assemble and market Simca models in Australia, Chrysler Australia produced the Vedette Beaulieu through to 1962, using both fully imported and locally sourced components.
