= Simca do Brasil =

- Industry: Automotive
- Founded: 1958
- Defunct: 1966 (Taken over by Chrysler, brand extinguished in favour of Dodge brand in 1969.)
- Fate: Renamed Chrysler do Brasil
- Successor: Chrysler do Brasil
- Headquarters: Brazil
- Key people: Henri Théodore Pigozzi, Simca founder and investor, Paulo Macedo Gontijo, general manager upon the company's foundation, Jacques Jean Pasteur, followed as general manager and streamlined manufacturing process, Sebastião Dayrell da Lima, the company's first president.
- Products: Simca Chambord, Simca Alvorada, Simca Profissional, Simca Présidence, Simca Jangada, Simca Regente, Simca Esplanada, Simca GTX
- Parent: Simca (1958–1966); Chrysler (1966–1969)

Simca do Brasil was the Brazilian subsidiary of the now defunct French automaker Simca. It started out in the late 1950s assembling the Simca Vedette imported in kit form from France and selling it in three versions, the Chambord, Présidence and Rallye. Later the company manufactured the radically restyled Esplanada with improved engines and, with increasing control by the Chrysler Corporation over the French concern, was taken over with the American car giant becoming its majority shareholder. During its ten years of market presence Simca defended its market share against fierce competition from Volkswagen, Ford, Chevrolet and Willys. The brand disappeared from the Brazilian market in the late 1960s following a strategic decision by its owners Chrysler.

== Foundation ==
The Simca plant received a visit by Juscelino Kubitschek before his inauguration as president in 1956, organized by a Brazilian General who had a family member employed in Poissy. Kubitschek jokingly invited Simca to build a plant in Minas Gerais, his home state. Simca took this proposal quite seriously and sent a letter of intent to produce cars in Brazil. In the interim, Brazil had formed an Executive Group for the Automotive Industry (GEIA), which had laid forth a set of requirements for any producer wishing to establish a plant in Brazil. Simca claimed that their proposal and arrangement with Kubitschek pre-dated these rules and lobbied for exceptions. Simca also lobbied directly in Minas but were in the end forced to present their own proposal, which was passed with a number of contingencies.

Simca do Brasil was then founded on 5 May 1958 in the City of Belo Horizonte, capital of the Brazilian state of Minas Gerais, as a result of Brazilian President Juscelino Kubitschek efforts to lure foreign car companies to pioneer this market with huge potential through tempting fiscal advantages. Assembly of the Vedette (and derivatives) began in March 1959.

Simca do Brasil initially imported kits of the Simca Vedette supplied by the French Simca HQ and had them assembled in their facilities in São Bernardo do Campo (State of São Paulo), where the administration would move to later on, and Rio de Janeiro. In spite of promises made, first to President Kubitschek and later to the GEIA (the Brazilian Executive Group for the Automotive Industry), Simca's activities were never moved to Minas Gerais. The first car left the assembly line in 1959 but was plagued with enormous problems not only because of the 480 strong, but totally inexperienced workforce. The delays in passing the GEIA rules meant that Simca were unable to access hard currency and suffered severe parts problems as a result. A reputation for low quality quickly developed, one which Simca was unable to shake.

== From assembling to manufacturing ==
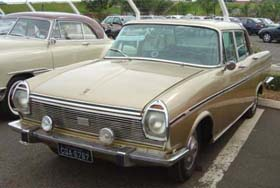
Simca Esplanada manufactured by Simca do Brasil

Meanwhile, Simca do Brasil imported all the tools and machinery to start its own production and was busy recruiting 980 local OEM parts suppliers to transform the Simca Chambord, Présidence and Rallye models into true Brazilian made cars because of Brazilian government demands in exchange for the benefits granted so far. But the huge problems faced on a daily basis at the assembly line threatened to put the future manufacturing site in severe doubts.

A crisis broke out and Simca do Brasil threatened to become paralyzed by the growing problems. Simca France, having invested heavily in their Brazilian offspring, then sent their top engineer Jacques Jean Pasteur to Brazil not only to streamline the production but to actually run the entire operation. By 1961 Pasteur had successfully addressed the issues and cars were being built with 98% of parts from national suppliers.

Simca do Brasil was in discussions with Fiat to replace the old flathead V8, with its prewar roots, with Fiat's 8V engine which had only been built in a very small series, but nothing came of these plans.

== Chrysler takes over ==
In the second half of 1966 Chrysler took over as majority shareholder, after having bought 92% of Simca. From August 1967 onwards, cars left the production line with a small badge at the rear saying "fabricado pela Chrysler” (built by Chrysler), sending out the message of the takeover by the American car brand. The well established Simca name remained in use for another two years. Finally, in 1969, the Simca name was laid to rest as the Americans re-introduced one of their internationally renowned brand names by launching the Dodge Dart on the Brazilian market.

== Models ==
- Simca Chambord (Brazilian model)
- Simca Alvorada
- Simca Profissional
- Simca Rallye
- Simca Présidence (Brazilian model)
- Simca Jangada
- Simca Esplanada
- Simca Regente
- Simca Tufão
- Simca GTX
