= São Paulo International Motor Show =

Motor show in Brazil

Coordinates: 23.5165°S 46.6363°W

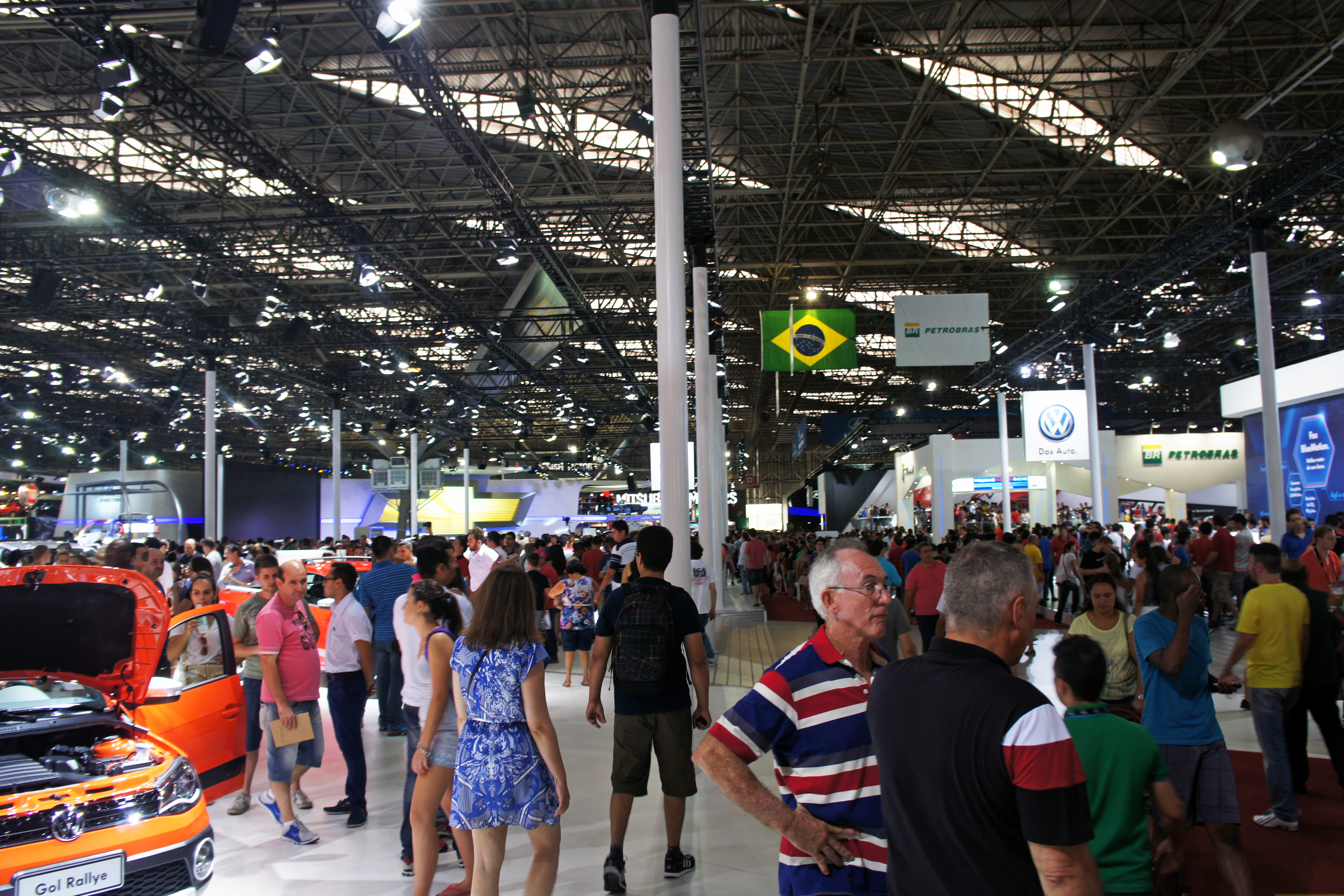
- Status: Active
- Venue: Ibirapuera Park (until 1968); Anhembi Convention Center (until 2014); São Paulo Expo (since 2016)
- Locations: São Paulo, Brazil
- Country: Brazil
- Inaugurated: 1960–present
- Website: salaodoautomovel.com.br

The São Paulo International Motor Show (Salão International do Automóvel de São Paulo) is the biggest and most important automotive event in Latin America. The São Paulo International Motor Show has been held in São Paulo since 1960. Originally being held irregularly, it has been a bi-annual show since 1984 (although there was no 2020 edition due to the coronavirus pandemic). In 1990 the event became internationalized and the domestic industry showed its capacity for global competition.

== Locations ==
The original six exhibitions took place at the centrally located Ibirapuera Park. From 1970 until 2014, the Show was held indoors, at the Anhembi Convention Center. The two most recent events have been held at the São Paulo Expo.

== 1960 ==
The inaugural edition opened on 25 November 1960. 12 manufacturers were represented and 400,000 visitors - including domestic automobile industry champion, President Juscelino Kubitschek - attended.

== 1961 ==
At the second show, premieres included the Willys Interlagos, the Simca Chambord, and a revamped Volkswagen 1200.

== 1962 ==
The third edition included the premieres of the locally produced Volkswagen Karmann Ghia (Typ 14) and the Vemag Fissore, as well as the Toyota Bandeirante, the Scania L-75, and the Chevrolet Amazona trucks.

== 1964 ==
With the fourth edition, the show adopted its current biannual schedule. The impact of Brazil's economy and political situations have, however, sometimes led to three-year gaps and occasionally to successive shows. This was the first year that the show was held under the military dictatorship. Volkswagen and Ford both boycotted the event.

The biggest premiere was the 1965 Aero Willys; lesser stars included the limited production Brasinca Uirapuru, the Chevrolet Veraneio utility vehicle, and the Vemaguet Rio.

== 2010 ==
The 26th motor show was held between 25 October to 7 November.

Production car introductions

- Chevrolet Montana

Concept car introductions

- Fiat Uno Cabrio concept
- Fiat Mio concept
- Rossin-Bertin Vorax
- Volkswagen RockeT concept

== 2012 ==
The 27th edition was held from 24 October to 4 November 2012.

Production car introductions (local)

- Bugatti Veyron Grand Sport Vitesse Rafale
- Chery Riich M1 REEV
- Chevrolet Onix
- Fiat Grand Siena "Sublime"
- Fiat Linea "Sublime"
- Fiat Palio Sporting "Interlagos"
- Fiat Uno Sporting "Interlagos"
- Honda Fit Twist
- Hyundai HB20
- Hyundai HB20X
- Mahindra Quanto
- Mercedes-Benz SLS 63 AMG GT3 "45th Anniversary"
- Mitsubishi Lancer Evolution X Carbon Series
- Nissan Frontier "10 Anos"
- Nissan LEAF Taxi
- Nissan March Rio 2016
- Nissan Sentra "Special Edition"
- Peugeot Hoggar Quiksilver
- Renault Novo Clio
- Renault Fluence GT
- Renault Sandero GT
- Suzuki Jimny 4SUN
- Suzuki Jimny 4ALL
- Suzuki Jimny 4WORK
- Suzuki Jimny 4SPORT
- Toyota Etios
- Toyota Prius GS
- Troller T4
- Volvo V60 Racing
- Volkswagen CrossFox
- Volkswagen Saveiro Cross
- Volkswagen Space Cross
- Volkswagen Gol 3-door

Concept car introductions

- Fiat Bravo Xtreme Concept
- Ford Evos Yellow Concept
- Nissan EXTREM Concept
- Renault DCross Concept
- Toyota iiMo Concept
- Toyota TS030 Hybrid (Le Mans sports car)
- Troller R-X Concept
- Volkswagen Taigun Concept

== 2014 ==
The 28th edition was held between 30 October and 9 November 2014.

== 2016 ==
The 29th edition was held between 10 and 20 November 2016.

== 2018 ==
The 30th edition was held between 9 and 18 November 2018.
