= Simca =

Automobile company

- Type: Subsidiary
- Industry: Automotive
- Founded: 1934
- Founder: Henri Pigozzi
- Defunct: 1970; 56 years ago
- Fate: Merged into Chrysler Europe becoming a brand in 1970
- Successor: Chrysler France
- Headquarters: Nanterre, France (1935–1961); Poissy, France (1954–1970)
- Products: Automobiles
- Brands: Talbot (1959–70)
- Parent: Fiat S.p.A. (1934–58); Chrysler (1958–67); Chrysler Europe (1967–70)
- Subsidiaries: Ford France (1954–58); Simca do Brasil (1958–66)

Simca (Société Industrielle de Mécanique et Carrosserie Automobile; Mechanical and Automotive Body Manufacturing Company) was a French automaker, founded in November 1934 by Fiat S.p.A. and directed from July 1935 to May 1963 by the Italian Henri Pigozzi. Simca was affiliated with Fiat and, after Simca bought Ford's French subsidiary, became increasingly controlled by Chrysler. In 1970, Simca became a brand of Chrysler's European business, ending its period as an independent company. Simca disappeared in 1978, when Chrysler divested its European operations to another French automaker, PSA Peugeot Citroën. PSA replaced the Simca brand with Talbot after a short period when some models were badged as Simca-Talbots.

During most of its post-war activity, Simca was one of the biggest automobile manufacturers in France. The Simca 1100 was for some time the best-selling car in France, while the Simca 1307 and Simca Horizon won the European Car of the Year title in 1976 and 1979, respectively—these models were badge-engineered as products of other marques in some countries. For instance, the Simca 1307 was sold in Britain as the Chrysler Alpine, and the Horizon was also sold under the Chrysler brand.

Simca vehicles were also manufactured by Simca do Brasil in São Bernardo do Campo, Brazil, and Barreiros (another Chrysler subsidiary) in Spain. They were also assembled in Australia, Chile, Colombia and the Netherlands during the Chrysler era. In Argentina, Simca had a small partnership with Metalmecánica SAIC (better known as de Carlo) for the production of the Simca Ariane in 1965.

As of April 2026, the entire former assets of Simca were owned by Peugeot's, Fiat's and Chrysler's ultimate successor, Stellantis.

== Foundation ==
Henri Pigozzi was active in the automotive business in the early 1920s when he met Fiat founder Giovanni Agnelli. They began business together in 1922 with Pigozzi acting as a scrap merchant, buying old automobile bodies and sending them to Fiat for recycling. Two years later Pigozzi became Fiat's General Agent in France and in 1926 SAFAF (Société Anonyme Française des Automobiles Fiat) was founded. In 1928, SAFAF started the assembly of Fiat cars in Suresnes near Paris and licensed the production of some parts to local suppliers. By 1934, as many as 30,000 Fiat cars were sold by SAFAF.

== Simca-Fiat ==
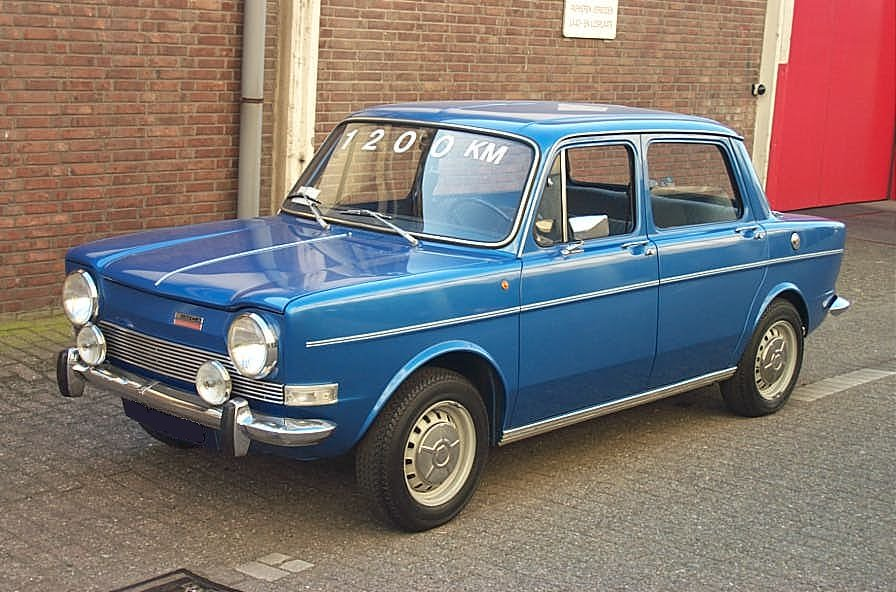
Simca 1000 GL (1974)

The SIMCA (Société Industrielle de Mécanique et de Carrosserie Automobile) company was founded in 1935 by Fiat S.p.A., when it bought the former Donnet factory in the French town of Nanterre.

The first cars produced were Fiat 508 Balillas and Fiat 518 Arditas, but with Simca-Fiat 6CV and 11CV badges. They were followed during 1936 by the 3CV Simca 5, a version of the Fiat Topolino announced in the Spring, but only available for sale from October 1936. Its name references the first digit of the car's 570 cc displacement. The Huit, a 6CV version of the Fiat 508C-1100, appeared in late 1937 for the 1938 model year - hence its name. Production of the 6CV and 11CV stopped in 1937, leaving the 5 and the 8 in production until the outbreak of World War II. The firm nevertheless remained closely connected with Fiat, and it was not until 1938 that the shortened name "Simca" replaced "Simca-Fiat".

Of the businesses that emerged as France's big four auto-makers after the war, Simca was unique in not suffering serious bomb damage to its plant. There were persistent suggestions that Henri Pigozzi's close personal relationship with the Agnelli family (which owned Fiat) and Fiat's powerful political influence with the Mussolini government in Italy secured relatively favourable treatment for Simca during the years when France fell under the control of Italy's powerful ally, Germany. Despite France being occupied, Simca cars continued to be produced in small numbers throughout the war.

Following the 1944 liberation, the company's close association with Italy became an obvious liability in the feverish atmosphere of recrimination and new beginnings that swept France following four years of German occupation. Nevertheless, shortly after the liberation, the Nanterre plant's financial sustainability received a boost when Simca won a contract from the American army to repair large numbers of Jeep engines.

== 1946: a decisive year ==
On 3 January 1946, the new government's five-year plan for the automobile industry (remembered, without affection, as the Pons Plan) came into force. Government plans for Simca involved pushing it into a merger with various smaller companies such as Delahaye-Delage, Bernard, Laffly and Unic so as to create an automobile manufacturing combine to be called “Générale française automobile” (GFA). With half an eye on the Volkswagen project across the Rhine, the authorities determined that GFA should produce the two door version of the "AFG", a small family car that had been developed during the war by the influential automobile engineer, Jean-Albert Grégoire. Grégoire owed his influence to a powerfully persuasive personality and a considerable engineering talent. Regarding the future of the French automobile industry, Grégoire held strong opinions, two of which were a preference for front-wheel drive and for aluminium as a material for car bodies. A few weeks after the liberation, Grégoire joined the Simca board as General Technical Director in order to prepare for the production of the AFG at the company's Nanterre factory.

For Simca, faced with a determinedly dirigiste left-wing French government, the prospect of nationalisation seemed very real. (Renault had already been confiscated and nationalised by the government at the start of 1945.) Simca's long-standing (but Italian-born) Director General, Henri Pigozzi, was obliged to deploy his very considerable reserves of guile and charm in order to retain his own position within the company, and it appears that in the end Pigozzi owed his very survival at Simca to the intervention with the national politicians of his new boardroom colleague, Jean-Albert Grégoire. In return, Grégoire obtained the personal commitment of the surviving Director General to the production at Nanterre of his two-door AFG.

It is very easy to see how the two-door AFG looked, because its four-door equivalent went into production, little changed from Grégoire's prototype, as the Panhard Dyna X. It was a car designed by an engineer, and Pigozzi thought it ugly. Simca designers hoped to make it more appealing to the style-conscious car buyers who, it was believed, would appear in Simca showrooms once the economy picked up and government restrictions on car ownership began to be relaxed. The designers took the underpinnings of the Grégoire prototype and clothed it with various more conventionally modern bodies, the last of which looked uncannily similar to a shortened Peugeot 203. This 'Simca-Grégoire' performed satisfactorily in road tests in France and around Turin (home town of Fiat, which still owned Simca), and by September 1946 the car was deemed ready for production. But Pigozzi was still cautious. He had little enthusiasm for the gratuitously unfathomable complexities involved in producing a mass-market front-wheel drive car. The experience of the Citroën Traction Avant, which had bankrupted its manufacturer in the mid-1930s, was not encouraging. Pigozzi therefore applied to the (at this stage still strongly interventionist) government for a far higher level of government subsidy than the government could contemplate. Both the “Simca-Grégoire” project and the government's own enthusiasm for micro-managing the French automobile industry were by now running out of momentum. Sensing that there was no prospect of putting the 'Simca-Grégoire' into production any time soon, General Technical Director Grégoire resigned from the company early in 1947.

Meanwhile, in October 1946, at the first Paris Motor Show since the end of the Second World War, two models were on display on the Simca stand, being the Simca 5 and the Simca 8, at this stage barely distinguishable from their pre-war equivalents. A new car arrived in 1948 with the Simca 6, a development of the Simca 5 which it would eventually replace, featuring an overhead valve 570 cc engine: the Simca 6 was launched ahead of the introduction of the equivalent Fiat.

The French economy in this period was in a precarious condition and government pressure was applied on the automakers to maximize export sales. During the first eight months of 1947, Simca exported 70% of cars produced, placing it behind Citroën (92% exported), Renault (90% exported), Peugeot (87% exported) and Ford France (83% exported). In the struggle to maximize exports, Simca was handicapped by the fact that it was not allowed to compete directly with its principal Italian shareholder, Fiat.

== Aronde and Ford SAF takeover ==
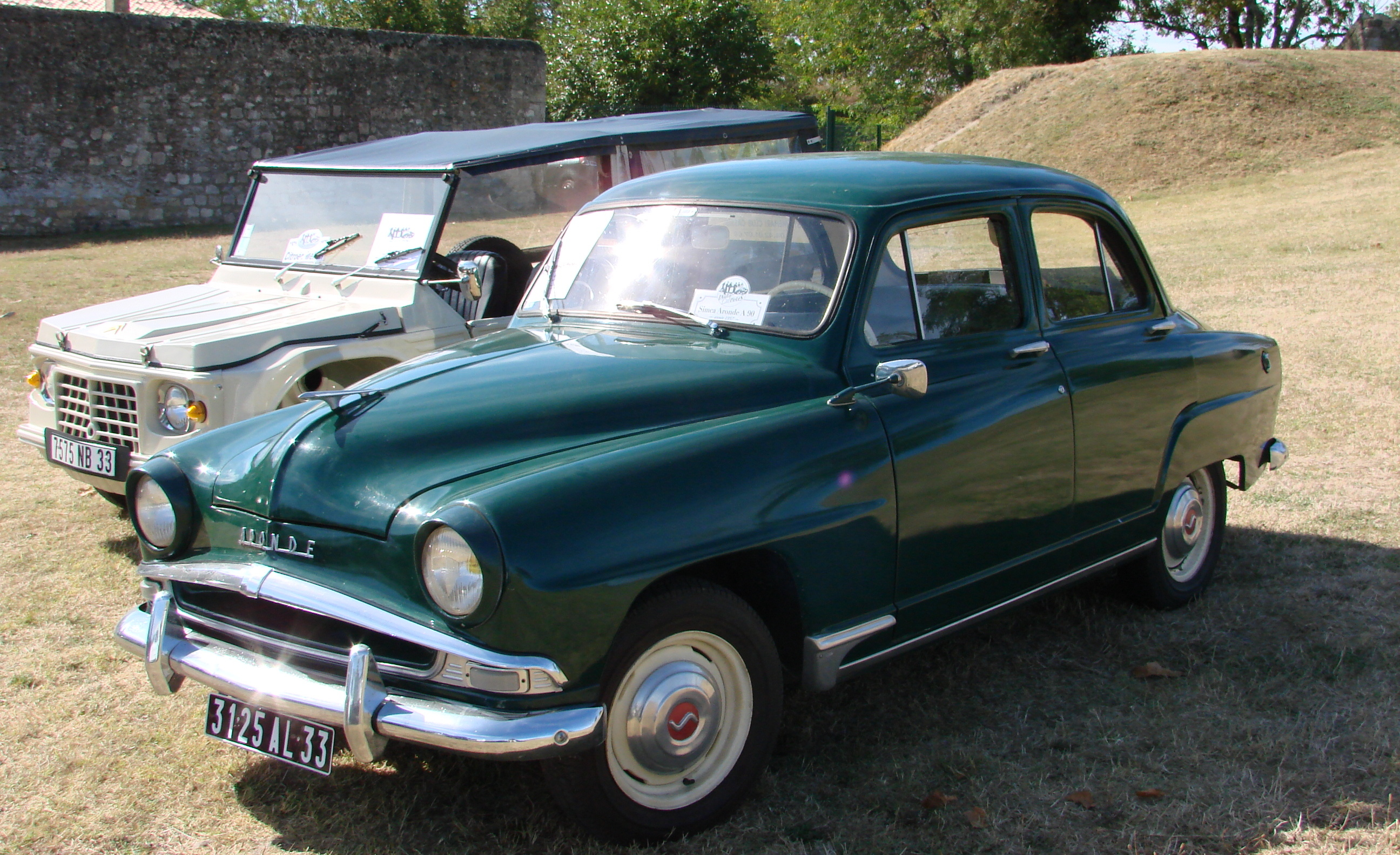
Simca Aronde (1956)

The Simca Aronde, launched in 1951, was the first Simca model not based on a Fiat design. It had a 1200 cc engine and its production reached 100,000 units yearly. Following this success, Simca took over the French truck manufacturers Unic in 1951, Saurer in 1956, and the Poissy plant of Ford SAF in 1954. The Poissy plant had ample room for expansion, enabling Simca to consolidate French production in a single plant and, in 1961, to sell the old Nanterre plant.

The 1950s was a decade of growth for Simca, and by 1959 the combined output of the plants at Nanterre and at Poissy had exceeded 225,000 cars, placing the manufacturer in second place among French automakers in volume terms, ahead of Peugeot and Citroën, though still far behind market leader Renault.

The Ford purchase also added the V-8 powered Ford Vedette range to the Simca stable. This model continued to be produced and progressively upgraded until 1962 in France and 1967 in Brazil, but with various names under the Simca badge. An Aronde-powered version was also made in 1957 and called the Ariane which, because it was economical and had a large body, was popular as a taxi.

In 1958, Simca bought the French Talbot-Lago manufacturing company.

== Brazil ==
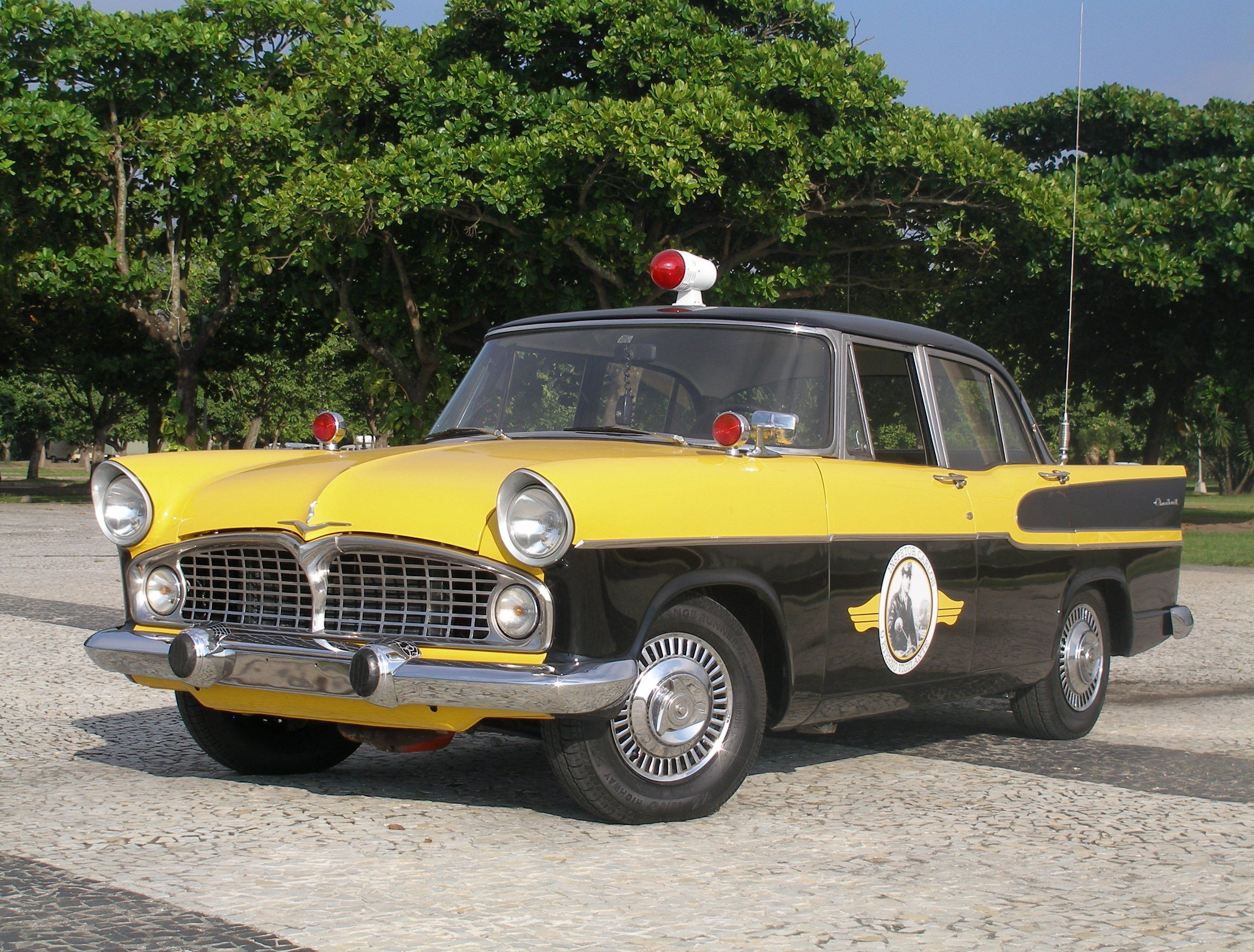
A Brazilian-made Simca Chambord, used on the TV series O Vigilante Rodoviário (1961-1962)

The Simca plant received a visit by Juscelino Kubitschek before his inauguration in 1956, organized by a Brazilian General who had a family member employed there. He jokingly invited Simca to build a plant in Minas Gerais, his home state. Simca followed through and sent a letter of intent to this effect. In the interim, Brazil had formed an Executive Group for the Automotive Industry (GEIA), which had established a set of requirements for any producer wishing to establish a plant in Brazil. Simca claimed that their proposal and arrangement with Kubitschek pre-dated these rules and lobbied for exceptions. Simca also lobbied directly in Minas, but in the end were forced to present their own proposal, which was accepted with a number of conditions. The delays in passing the GEIA rules meant that Simca, which established its first plant in São Paulo, was unable to access hard currency and suffered severe parts shortages as a result. Simca quickly developed a reputation for low quality which it was unable to shake.

Simca do Brasil was originally 50% Brazilian-owned, but after Chrysler took over Simca France in 1966 they also obtained control of the Brazilian arm. Simca remained based in São Paulo for the entire time they were active in Brazil and never moved to Minas, as originally promised. Their range was built around the 2.4 liter V8-engined Simca Vedette, which entered production in Brazil in March 1959. It was built under a variety of names and in a number of different bodystyles, until the Simca badge was retired there in 1969. Later models were redesigned completely, and were sold as the Simca Esplanada.

== Fulgur ==
The Simca Fulgur was a concept car designed in 1958 by Robert Opron for Simca and first displayed at the 1959 Geneva Auto Show. It was also displayed at the New York Auto Show, and the 1961 Chicago Auto Show. The concept car was intended to show what cars in the year 2000 would look like. It was to be atomic powered, voice controlled, guided by radar, and use only two wheels balanced by gyroscopes when driven at over 150 km/h. Fulgur is Latin for flash or lightning.

== Chrysler ==
In 1958, the American car manufacturer Chrysler, which wanted to enter the European car market, bought Ford's 15.2% of Simca stock in a deal which Henry Ford II was later reported as having publicly regretted. At this stage, however, the dominant shareholder remained Fiat S.p.A., and their influence is apparent in the engineering and design of Simcas of that period such as the 1000 and 1300 models introduced respectively in 1961 and 1963. However, in 1963 Chrysler increased their stake to a controlling 64% by purchasing stock from Fiat, and they subsequently extended that holding further to 77%. Even in 1971 Fiat retained a 19% holding, but by now they had long ceased to play an active role in the business.

Also, in 1964 Chrysler bought the British manufacturer Rootes thus putting together the basis of Chrysler Europe. All the Simca models manufactured after 1967 had the Chrysler pentastar logo as well as Simca badging. In 1961, Simca started to manufacture all of its models in the ex-Ford SAF factory in Poissy and sold the factory at Nanterre to Citroën. The rear-engined Simca 1000 was introduced in 1961 with its sporting offspring, the Simca-Abarth in 1963. The 1000 also served as the platform for the 1000 Coupe, a sports coupe sporting a Bertone-designed body by Giorgetto Giugiaro and 4-wheel disc brakes. It debuted in 1963 and was described by Car Magazine as "the world's neatest small coupe". 1967 saw the more powerful 1200S Bertone Coupe that, with a horsepower upgrade in 1970, could reach the dizzying speed of almost 112 mph (180 km/h), making it the fastest standard production Simca ever built. In 1967, a much more up to date car, the 1100, appeared with front wheel drive and independent suspension all round, and continued in production until 1979. On 1 July 1970 the company title was formally changed to Chrysler France.

Having increased its stake to 77% of Simca in 1963 and taken control of the Rootes Group by mid-1964, Chrysler had already marketed numerous Simca and Rootes models in the United States, including the Simca 1204, via a new Simca-Rootes Division, formed in 1966 — with 850 dealers selling four Simca models and 400 dealers selling four Rootes models. Results were dismal, and in late 1969, Chrysler announced it would henceforth market its Rootes and Simca products from its Chrysler-Plymouth Division. The Simca 1204 was imported to the United States through 1971, marketed next to another captive import, the Plymouth Cricket, at its Plymouth dealerships.

== Collapse of Chrysler Europe ==
The most successful pre-Chrysler Simca models were the Aronde, the Simca 1000 and the front-engined 1100 compact. During the 1970s Chrysler era, Simca produced the new Chrysler 160/180/2 litre saloon, 1307 range (Chrysler Alpine in the UK) and later the Horizon, (Dodge Omni and Plymouth Horizon in the USA). The 1307 and Horizon were both named European Car of the Year at launch. However, Chrysler's forced marriage of Simca and Rootes was not a happy one - Chrysler Europe collapsed in 1977 and the remains were sold to Peugeot SA the following year for a nominal US$1.00 plus assumption of outstanding debt. The cars sold reasonably well in France, but were outsold by their key Ford, British Leyland and Vauxhall rivals in Britain.

The last remaining Simca and Rootes models were discontinued by the end of 1981, and the Simca-based Alpine and Horizon soldiered on through the first half of the 1980s using the resurrected Talbot badge, which itself had vanished from passenger cars within a decade.

Meanwhile, Peugeot expanded its own brand and made use of the former Simca and Rootes factories for production of its own vehicles, although the Talbot brand survived into the 1990s on commercial vehicles.

== Afterlife ==
Peugeot eventually abandoned the Talbot brand, and the last Simca design was launched as Peugeot 309 (instead of Talbot Arizona as had been originally planned). The Peugeot 309 used Simca engines until October 1991 (some 18 months before the end of production) when they were replaced by PSA's own TU and XU series of engines. The 309 was produced at the former Rootes factory in Ryton-on-Dunsmore, UK, as well as in the Poissy plant.

Simcas were also manufactured in Brazil, Colombia, Spain and Finland. The last Simca-based car produced was the Horizon-based Dodge Omni, which was built in the USA until 1990. The European equivalent had already been axed three years earlier when use of the Talbot name on passenger cars was finally discontinued.

== Models ==
- Simca 5
- Simca 6
- Simca 8
- Simca 9
- Simca 11
- Simca Gordini Type 15 (Grand Prix racing car)
- Simca Aronde
- Simca Ariane
- Simca Vedette (also manufactured in license by Simca do Brasil with the names Simca Chambord, Simca Alvorada, Simca Profissional and Simca Présidence)
- Simca Jangada (Brazilian model)
- Simca Esplanada (Brazilian model)
- Simca Regente (Brazilian model)
- Simca Tufão (Brazilian model)
- Simca GTX (Brazilian model)
- Simca 1000
- Simca 1000 Coupé
- Simca 1100
- Simca 1300/1500
- Simca 1301/1501
- Simca 1200S
- Chrysler-Simca 1609/1610/2-Litre
- Matra-Simca Bagheera
- Matra-Simca Rancho
- Simca 1307/1308/1309/1s510
- Simca Horizon
- Talbot-Simca Solara

== Production Numbers ==
Calendar Year	Simca 5	Simca 8	Simca 6	Simca 9 Aronde	Vedette	Ariane	1000 and Coupe	1100	1200s	1300/1301	1500/1501	Chrysler 160/180	Total
1936	7282	-	-	-	-	-	-	-	-	-	-	-	7282
1937	12925	318	-	-	-	-	-	-	-	-	-	-	13243
1938	14194	6739	-	-	-	-	-	-	-	-	-	-	20933
1939	12131	7680	-	-	-	-	-	-	-	-	-	-	19811
1940	3604	1911	-	-	-	-	-	-	-	-	-	-	5515
1941	33604	1911	-	-	-	-	-	-	-	-	-	-	7094
1942	632	2217	-	-	-	-	-	-	-	-	-	-	2849
1943	19	122	-	-	-	-	-	-	-	-	-	-	141
1944	23	180	-	-	-	-	-	-	-	-	-	-	203
1945	47	65	-	-	-	-	-	-	-	-	-	-	112
1946	3411	4832	-	-	-	-	-	-	-	-	-	-	8243
1947	3733	8053	11	-	-	-	-	-	-	-	-	-	11797
1948	3901	14074	191	-	-	-	-	-	-	-	-	-	18166
1949	221	15580	10813	-	-	-	-	-	-	-	-	-	26614
1950	-	26258	5497	-	-	-	-	-	-	-	-	-	31755
1951	-	20568	-	21932	-	-	-	-	-	-	-	-	42500
1952	-	27	-	69028	-	-	-	-	-	-	-	-	69055
1953	-	-	-	61567	-	-	-	-	-	-	-	-	61567
1954	-	-	-	92432	-	-	-	-	-	-	-	-	92432
1955	-	-	-	115646	42349	-	-	-	-	-	-	-	157995
1956	-	-	-	133105	44836	-	-	-	-	-	-	-	177941
1957	-	-	-	138064	17875	14703	-	-	-	-	-	-	170642
1958	-	-	-	143542	28142	35068	-	-	-	-	-	-	206752
1959	-	-	-	194553	15966	24852	-	-	-	-	-	-	235371
1960	-	-	-	175384	13914	29185	-	-	-	-	-	-	218483
1961	-	-	-	164297	3813	33733	9670	-	-	-	-	-	211513
1962	-	-	-	84236	-	14284	154282	-	-	-	-	-	252802
1963	-	-	-	31522	-	7593	168654	-	-	58758	7090	-	273617
1964	-	-	-	21	-	-	113818	-	-	98624	64143	-	276606
1965	-	-	-	-	-	-	118655	-	-	64118	54713	-	237486
1966	-	-	-	-	-	-	174068	-	-	85658	67707	-	327433
1967	-	-	-	-	-	-	115397	24729	2352	78125	55279	-	275882
1968	-	-	-	-	-	-	114427	138242	5344	54425	37645	-	350083
1969	-	-	-	-	-	-	146321	146095	3257	45693	46910	-	388276
1970	-	-	-	-	-	-	133540	142014	2852	75732	30337	18395	402870
1971	-	-	-	-	-	-	122933	197201	936	90518	9420	63259	484267
1972	-	-	-	-	-	-	131595	260835	-	91608	9111	41399	534488
1973	-	-	-	-	-	-	136197	296984	-	88252	15687	50999	588119
Total (By 1973)	65451	112390	16512	1425329	166895	159418	1639557	1206100	14741	831511	398042	173992	6209938

== Bibliography ==
- Simca: L'aventure de l'hirondelle, by Adrien Cahuzac, Editions E-T-A-I, 2008.
- Simca: De Fiat à Talbot (Préface de Jacques Loste), by Michel G. Renou, Editions E-T-A-I, 1999.
- Guide Simca: Tous les modèles de 1965 à 1980, by Michel G. Renou, Editions EPA, 1995
- Guide Simca: Tous les modèles de 1934 à 1964, by Bruno Poirier, Editions EPA, 1994.
- Simca: Toute l'histoire, by Michel G. Renou, Editions EPA, 1984, re-issued 1994.
- Aronde: Le Grand livre (Préface de Caroline Pigozzi), by Michel G. Renou, Editions EPA, 1993.
- Simca: Un appétit d'oiseau, by Jacques Rousseau, Editions Jacques Grancher, 1984. Re-issued 1996, Editions Rétroviseur.
