= Ford flathead V8 engine =

Ford flathead V8
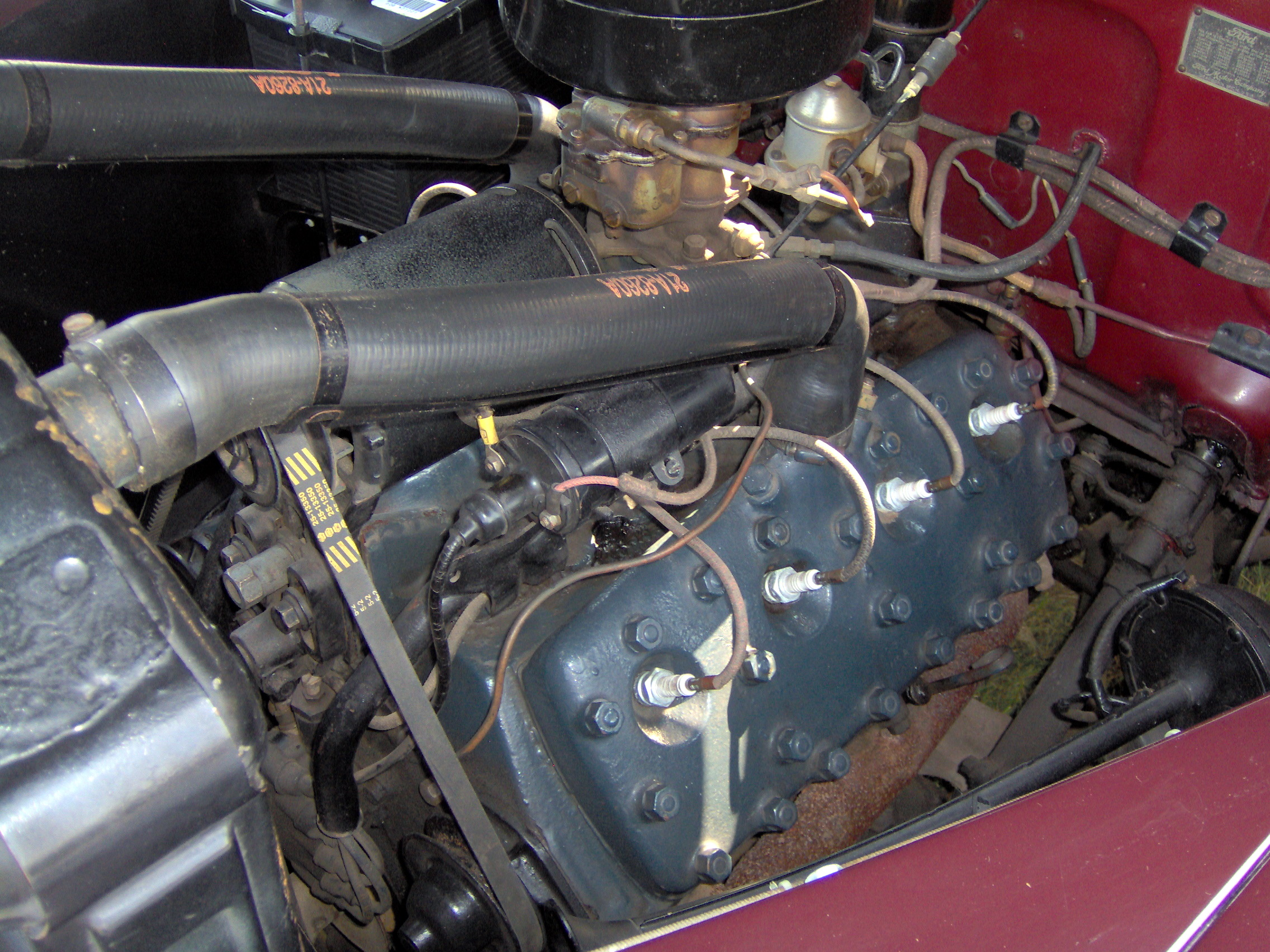
- Ford flathead V8 in a 1942 Ford Super Deluxe

Overview
- Manufacturer: Ford Motor Company
- Also called: Ford L-head V8
- Production: 1932–1953 for the U.S. consumer car-and-truck market; 1932–1954 for the Canadian consumer car-and-truck market

Layout
- Configuration: Side-valve V8

Chronology
- Successor: Ford Y-block V8; Lincoln Y-block V8

The Ford flathead V8 (often called simply the Ford flathead or flathead Ford) is a V8 engine with a flat cylinder head introduced by the Ford Motor Company in 1932 and built by Ford through 1953. During the engine's first decade of production, when overhead-valve engines were used by only a small minority of makes, it was usually known simply as the Ford V‑8, and the first car model in which it was installed, the Model 18, was (and still is) often called simply the "Ford V-8" after its new engine.

An automotive milestone as the first affordable V8, it ranks as one of the company's most important developments. The engine was intended to be used for big passenger cars and trucks; it was installed in such (with minor, incremental changes) until 1953, making the engine's 21-year production run for the U.S. consumer market longer than the 19-year run of the Ford Model T engine. It was also built independently by Ford licensees..

The Ford flathead V8 was named on Ward's list of the 10 best engines of the 20th century. It was a staple of hot rodders in the 1950s, and it remains famous in the classic car hobbies even today, despite the huge variety of other popular V8s that followed.

== Development and production ==
Ford had helped pioneer the concept of an affordable mass-produced car. Historically, these used inline-four and inline-six cylinder engines. Following French engineer Léon Levavasseur's invention of the V8 in 1902, V8s, V12s, and even V16s, were produced for use in luxury models. The Cadillac V8 engine is credited as the first mass-produced V8, and when Ford Motor Company acquired rival luxury marque Lincoln in 1922, the maker was already producing a flathead V8 with fork and blade connecting rods, which remained in production after Ford took over until 1932.

Even though Ford had an engineering team assigned to develop its own V8, many of the ideas and innovations were Henry Ford's. The Model A, its variants (B and 18), and this V8 engine were developed between 1926 and 1932, and this period was the elder Ford's last central contribution to the company's engineering.

Mercury's 239 cu in (3.9 L) version of the engine was introduced in 1939.

An economizing design feature of this engine was the use of three main bearings to support the crankshaft, rather than the customary five used with most V-8s. The flathead mounted the camshaft above the crankshaft, like later pushrod-operated overhead-valve engines. Valves for each bank were mounted inside the triangular area formed by the "vee" of cylinders. The intake manifold fed both banks from inside the vee, but the exhaust ports had to pass between the cylinders to reach the outboard exhaust manifolds, since it did not use a t-head configuration. Such an arrangement transferred exhaust heat to the block, imposing a large cooling load; it required far more coolant and radiator capacity than equivalent overhead-valve V8 engines. Ford flathead V8s were notorious for cracking blocks if their barely adequate cooling systems were overtaxed (such as in trucking or racing). The simple design left much room for improvement, and the power available after even low cost modifications was usually substantially more than could be obtained from an overhead-valve inline six-cylinder engine of similar displacement.

The Ford flathead V8 was manufactured in several countries other than the US, including France, Australia, Germany and Sweden.

The Ford flathead V8 was licensed to other producers. It was used by Simca in France until 1961 and in Brazil until 1964 for cars and until 1990 in the Simca Unic Marmon Bocquet military truck. In the United States, the flathead V8 was replaced by the more modern overhead-valve Ford Y-block engine in 1954. During World War II, the engine was used on the first prototype of the Romanian Mareșal tank destroyer, but was considered too weak and thus replaced by more powerful engines for later versions of the vehicle.

== Components ==
=== Crankshaft ===
The crankshaft development for the Ford flathead V8 was pioneering. The engine's production development program began with a forged steel crank, per conventional practice, but Ford then developed the improved foundry practice, heat-treating, and materials handling logistics to make the cranks from cast steel instead, yielding a crank just as strong, but less expensive to produce. These new methods were patented. The simple three-main-bearing crankshaft attached two connecting rods to a single crankpin, one rod from each cylinder bank. As with other crankshafts, static and dynamic balancing was performed (as this video on the Ford flathead V8 shows).

The short crankshaft proved quite durable in comparison to six-cylinder engines when roughly handled. For these reasons, the flathead Ford became a favorite among hot-rodders, and this in turn led to a rich supply of aftermarket performance parts. With the use of specialized pistons or connecting rods the stroke of the crankshaft could be increased by welding and regrinding as a method of increasing engine displacement, usually in combination with overboring.

=== Block ===
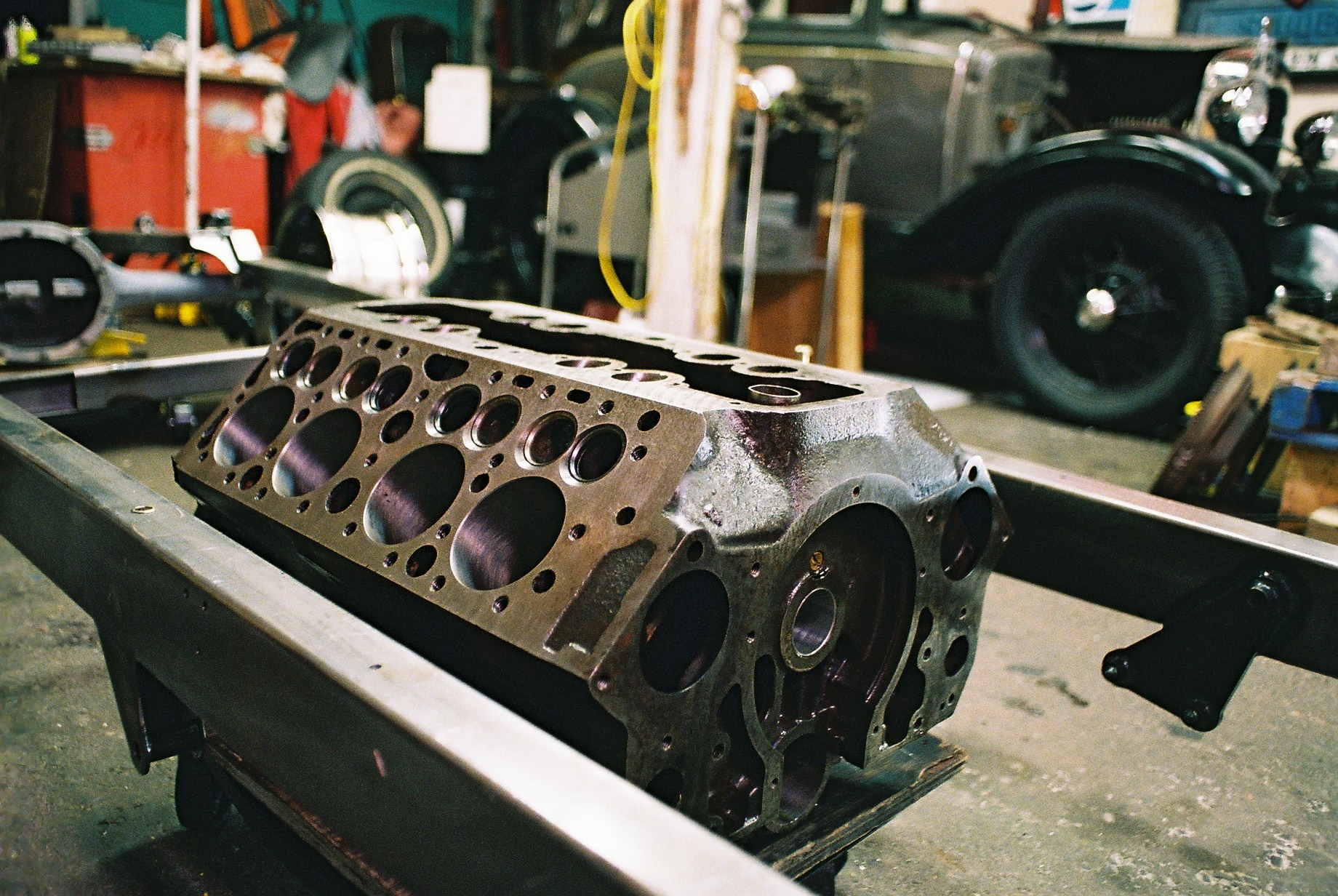
Engine block of a flathead V8 showing the location of the valve ports (the holes above the large cylinder bores)

One of the most important innovations in the Ford flathead V8 was the casting of the crankcase and all 8 cylinders in one engine block. This level of monobloc design for V-8 blocks had been accomplished before, but it had never seen mass production. Making it practical for the latter was an example of the production development needed to bring a V8 engine to the widely affordable segment of the market. Most V engines of the time had multiple cylinder blocks bolted to a common crankcase (itself a separate casting). At most, each bank of the V was an integral block, but many V engines had four- or even six-cylinder blocks, with cylinders cast in pairs or triples. Like most other engine blocks of the 20th century, it was cast iron; but the foundry practice (e.g., workflows, materials handling) was a revolutionary advancement in the mass production of castings. Charles E. Sorensen lived up to his longtime nickname at Ford, "Cast-Iron Charlie", by leading this revolution to bring Ford's first V8 to market.

As with any V8, the block was relatively light for the displacement supported. The cooling jacket reaches down to the bottom dead center, which is unusually low. American engineers at the time believed this would improve the piston cooling. The bottom of the block formed the parting line for the main bearing caps. The most complex part of the block was the exhaust passage routing. The exhaust valves were on the inside of the V and exhaust flow was initially downward and passed around the cylinders through the water jacket to exit on the outside of the cylinder block. The routing of the exhaust through the water jacket put an extremely heavy load on the cooling system and led to frequent overheating, especially on early models, if the cooling system was not maintained. Somewhat primitive water pumps used until the advent of the 1948 8RT and 1949 8BA models also contributed to the overheating problem. The space for the exhaust flow was also somewhat restricted, so the exhaust passages were tall and narrow in some locations. The gas flow past the rough sand castings could be greatly improved by polishing the passages. In early blocks, some cylinder walls were extremely thin due to cores shifting during casting.

=== Bearings ===
The engines built from 1932 to 1935 had poured main bearings which required skill and machine shop equipment to overhaul. Part of the 1936 production and all production from 1937 to the end of flathead V8 production had both replaceable shell main bearings and connecting rod inserts, enabling straightforward and low cost rebuilding, another reason why the Ford was a favorite of amateur mechanics. These shell main bearings are made of a cadmium silver alloy.

=== Camshaft and timing ===
The Ford flathead V8 has a single camshaft located inside the engine block above the crankshaft. It is spur gear driven; the camshaft's spur gear is made of plastic. The camshaft has three camshaft bearings. A lid made of cast iron covers the camshaft spur gears; the ignition distributor is placed on top of this lid and is driven by the camshaft spur gears. For powering the fuel pump, the camshaft is fitted with an extra cam located in the bearing on the flywheel side.

=== Lubrication ===
Ford products used high oil pressure for lubrication for the main and rod bearings, as do all modern vehicle combustion engines. This offered a significant performance advantage, as full pressure lubrication allowed for continuous use above 3500 rpm and would not starve the rod bearings for oil, which was necessary for high performance applications, such as racing. For this reason, bank robber Clyde Barrow preferred to steal Fords as getaway vehicles. It also eliminated a complex oil jet system to feed the rod bearings in the oil pan. As a side benefit to a prospective purchaser of a used vehicle, this also enabled the condition of the connecting rod and main bearings to be determined indirectly by observation of the oil pressure gauge after the vehicle was warmed up, provided that oil of normal viscosity was in use.

=== Exhaust ===
The exhaust outlets in the 1932–48 cars and the 1932–47 trucks were near the front of the manifolds aiming down and sometimes out. A Y-pipe took the exhaust gases to the right side of the vehicle to a single muffler, then to a single pipe out the back on the right side. The left side exhaust manifold exhausted to the front in the 1949–53 Ford cars, where a crossover pipe took the exhaust to the forward end of the right side manifold on the car engines and between the 1st and second cylinder on some trucks, in turn exhausting to a single pipe at the rear.

A common conversion for the 1949–53 Ford cars and 1952–53 Mercurys was to block off the right forward manifold entrance and route the left side exhaust to a new pipe to form a dual exhaust system with better flow characteristics. These typically involved installation of free-flowing mufflers, which if at a legal noise level still allowed low frequency sounds to pass, giving a characteristic rumbling dual exhaust sound to these systems. In the 1950s shortcut exhaust outlets with manually removed covers were added to street machines in emulation of vehicles intended for high speed straight line racing on dry lake beds, typically located just behind the front wheel, although chromed external runners sometimes extended to just forward of the rear wheel. These covers were referred to as lake plugs, the pipes as lake pipes. This style exhaust was also used legally in sanctioned drag racing and illegally in unsanctioned performance demonstrations.

=== Internal Air flow ===
More extreme modifications were to improve the airflow by removing material from the top of the block between the valves and the cylinders (called relieving), increasing the size of the inlet and exhaust passages (called porting), and by polishing the sand-cast surfaces to improve air flow. Increased compression ratios could be cheaply obtained by milling material from the head or by obtaining aluminum heads as aftermarket parts. Higher capacity intake manifolds were similarly available. Changing the camshaft to a higher performance version required head removal so that the valves could be held up out of the way, so this was usually done only as part of a substantial rework of the basic engine.

=== Overhead-valve kits ===
A popular modification for the flathead was conversion to an overhead-valve configuration, and many such modification kits were available, including the Ardun heads from Zora Arkus-Duntov who was to go on to fame as the "father of the Corvette". These conversions were not initially demanded by hot rodders looking for extra power, as they had not yet exhausted the capabilities of the flathead configuration, but were demanded by users of the engine in trucks and other such high load applications, where the constant flow of hot exhaust through the block to the exhaust manifolds caused the entire engine to overheat; the overhead-valve heads routed the exhaust out more directly, and away from the block.

== Hot-rodding applications ==
In the early 1950s, many hot-rodders could not afford to purchase and modify even a "cheap" flathead V-8, and a large investment in machine work and aftermarket parts was necessary to bring a Ford flathead V-8 to even the performance levels of most stock OHV V-8s available at the time. Even many inline six-cylinder engines from that period could be modified to produce more reliable and practical power than Ford V-8s, as the Ford flathead V-8 is saddled with many design features that make modifying it for true high-performance use difficult and expensive compared with other V-8s.

As modern OHV V-8s became available and affordable in salvage yards, the Ford flathead V-8 rapidly disappeared from the hot-rodding scene. Hot-rodding in general moved away from the salvage-yard car builds as parts and labor became more expensive and many hot-rod shops priced themselves out of business. The modern OHV V-8 powered vehicles available also contributed to the demise of hot-rodding's original culture (affordable modifications by working-class car owners), as new factory cars became capable of much higher performance than most hot-rods. Today, the flat-head Ford is mainly used in "retro" hot-rod builds by builders more interested in an historic feel and recreating history than performance.

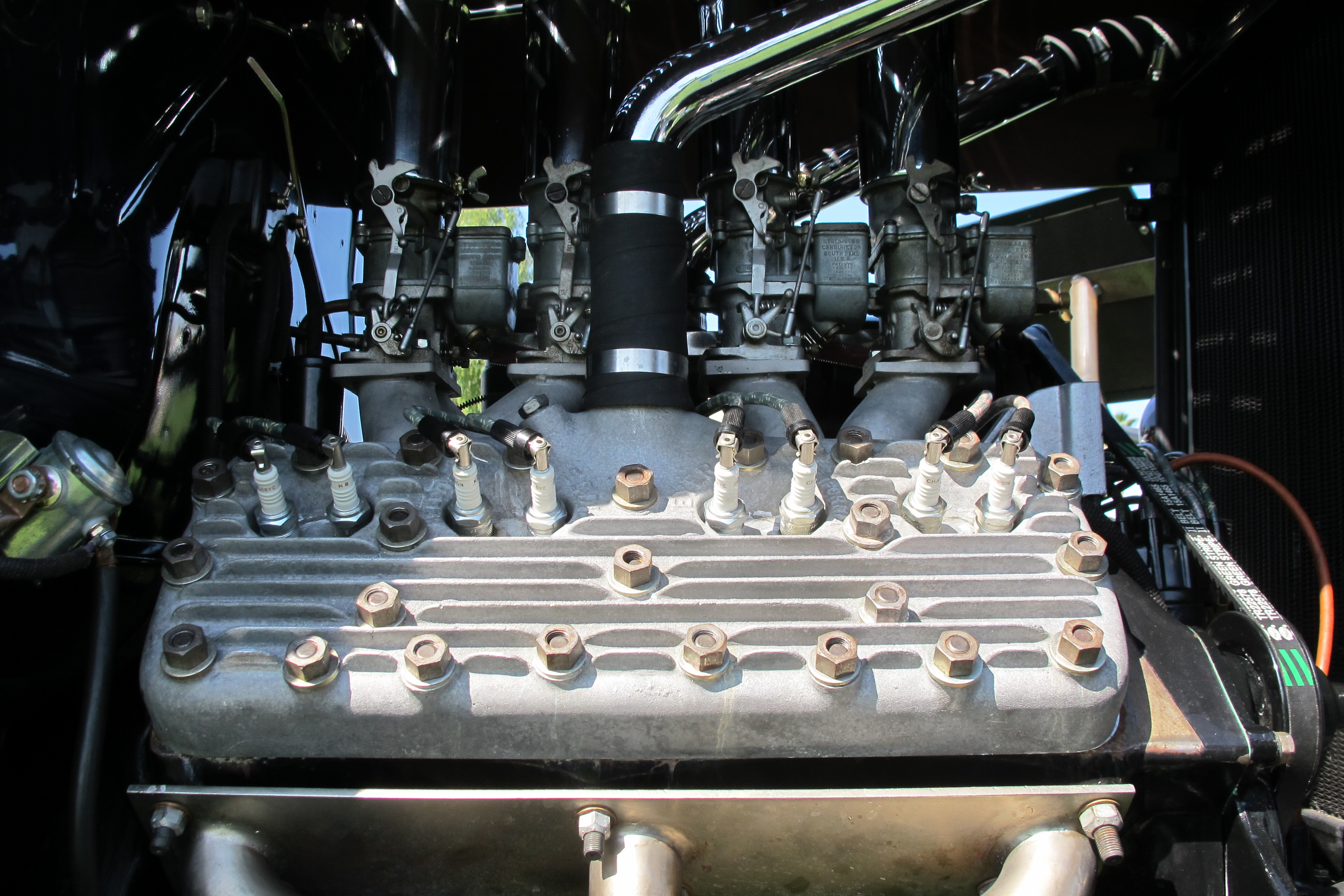
Ford flathead V-8 with an aftermarket twin plug cylinder head & Stromberg carburettors

=== Modern performance flatheads ===
Ford flatheads are still hot rodded today, with a special land speed record class for flathead engines. The current record holder achieves 700 hp (522 kW) and 300 mph (480 km/h). The current land speed record for a Ford flathead V8 stands at 302.462mph.

== Tractor conversions ==
During the 1930s to 1950s, the farm market in North America and parts of Europe demanded ever-increasing power output from farm tractors. It was in this climate that Ford experimented with V-8 tractor designs, some individual farmers converted their 4-cylinder tractors to Ford inline-6 or V-8 engines, and a few aftermarket companies offered such conversions for sale. Among the latter, the best-known were Funk conversions by brothers Joe and Howard Funk. In the 1930s, the Funk brothers built aircraft—including the Funk B, which used an engine design based on Ford engines. In the late 1940s, their aircraft line became unprofitable, but they found renewed profitability in aftermarket parts for tractors—transmissions, engines, and accessories. They sold many converted Ford N-Series tractors and conversion kits using Ford industrial inline-6 engines and Ford flathead V-8 engines.

== Version types ==
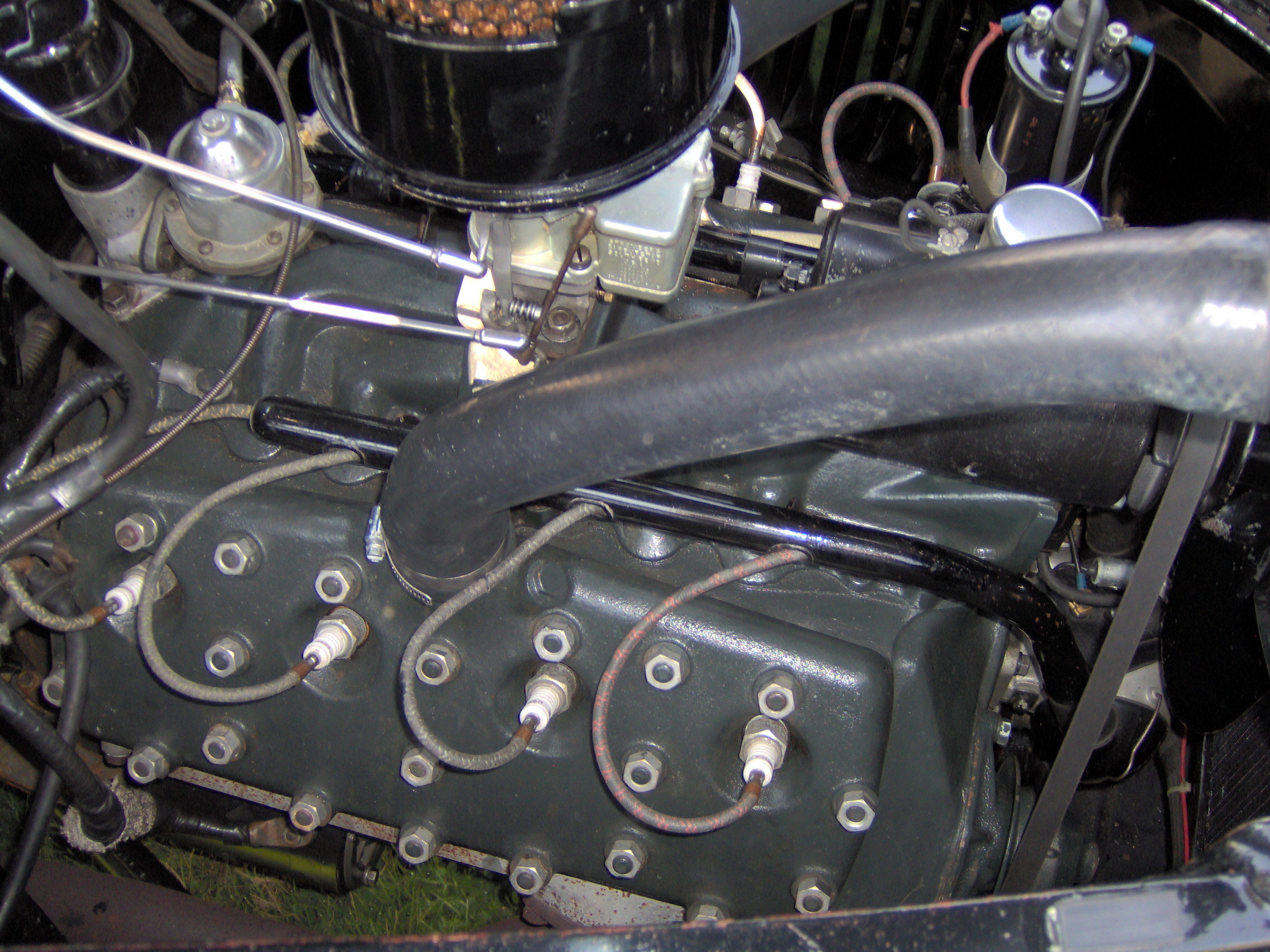
Flathead V8 in a 1937 Ford coupé

Types are classified by their displacement.

=== 221 ===
The original flathead engine displaced 221 cu in (3.6 L), with 3.0625 by 3.75 in (77.79 by 95.25 mm) bore and stroke. The block was cast as a single piece (monobloc) for durability, and a single-barrel carburetor fed the engine. The 1932 V8-18 with 5.5:1 compression produced 65 hp (48 kW). The 1933–34 V8-40 raised compression to 6.33:1 and power to 75 hp (56 kW). In 1934 a two barrel down draft carburetor was introduced. 1935's V8-48 saw compression drop to 6.3:1, but power climb to 85 hp (63 kW), and torque was rated at 144 lb⋅ft (195 N⋅m). It became the V8-68 in 1936, with compression, horsepower, and torque unchanged.

Production of the original 221 lasted from 1932 through to 1936. These engines can be identified by the fact that the water pumps are at the front of the heads. A similar 221 flathead was used in Fords for 1937 and 1938 but the block was revised to have the water pumps mounted on the block. This design also relocated the water outlet from the front of the heads to the top center of the heads. These, designated V8-78, were offered with standard 6.2:1 compression aluminum or 7.5:1 compression iron cylinder heads, rated at 85 hp (63 kW) and 144 lb⋅ft (195 N⋅m) (aluminum) or 94 hp (70 kW) (iron). The 1932 through 1938 motors used twenty-one studs to hold down each head and are known as "21 stud" motors. This motor continued to be made into the 1950s in Europe.

In late 1938 Ford introduced V8-81A, commonly called the "24 stud" engine because it uses twenty-four studs to hold down each head. This engine debuted at the same time as the 239 motor. With 6.12:1 compression, horsepower remained the same, but torque increased by 2 lb⋅ft (3 N⋅m). In 1939, as the V8-91A, compression increased to 6.15:1, power rose to 90 hp (67 kW), and torque reached 155 lb⋅ft (210 N⋅m); the ratings remained the same for the 1940 V8-01A, 1941 V8-11A, and the last civilian model, the V8-21A, which saw compression rise to 6.2:1. This engine was used through 1942 for civilian use and saw some use in military vehicles during World War Two. Collectively all of the 221 motors are commonly referred to as "85 horse" motors.

=== 239 ===
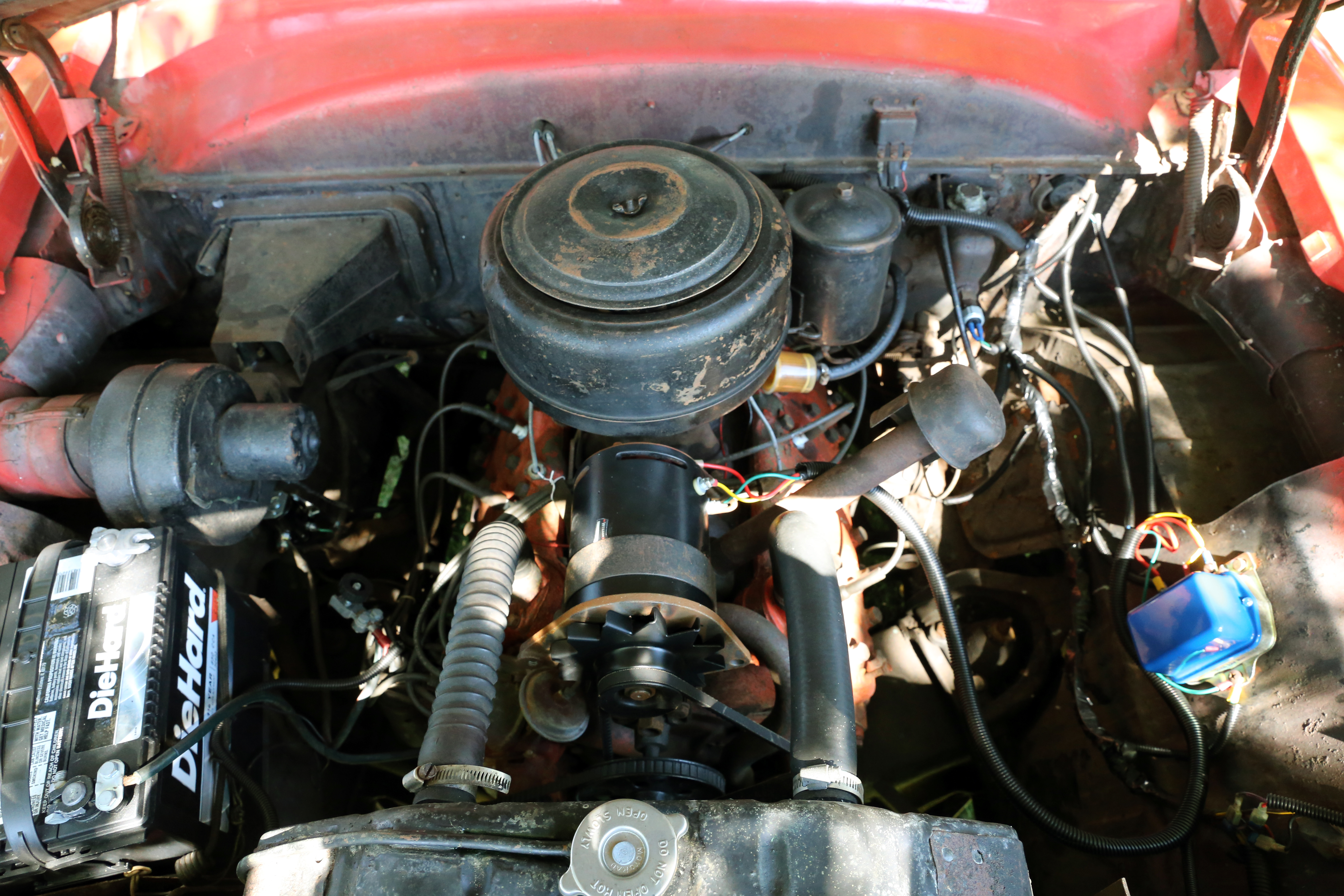
V8-B3 engine in a 1953 Ford Crestline Sunliner

Ford introduced the 239 cu in (3.9 L) V8-99A engine with 3.1875 by 3.75 in (80.96 by 95.25 mm) bore and stroke and 6.15:1 compression in 1939. It produced 95 hp (71 kW) and 170 lb⋅ft (230 N⋅m). This was done to provide a more powerful engine for the Mercury cars, which Ford Motor Company started making in 1939. It was used in Mercurys in 1939 and in Fords in 1946. This engine is very similar to later versions of the 221 engine. As the V8-09A in 1940, compression, power, and torque were unchanged; in 1941, the V8-19A compression and power were static, but torque rose by 6 lb⋅ft (8 N⋅m), while the 1942 V8-29A increased compression to 6.4:1 and power to 100 hp (75 kW), while torque stayed the same. Postwar, it became the V8-69 (suffixed "A" in Fords, "M" in Mercurys), with compression 6.75:1, 100 hp (75 kW), and 180 lb⋅ft (244 N⋅m). For 1947 and 1948, only the designation changed, to V8-79 and -89. The 239 was redesigned in 1948 as the 8RT for Ford trucks and in 1949 as the 8BA for the cars. It had higher 6.8:1 compression, but performance was unchanged. The 1950 V8-0BA boosted torque by 1 lb⋅ft (1 N⋅m), the 1951 -1BA by 6 lb⋅ft (8 N⋅m) more, while in 1952, as the V8-B2, compression climbed to 7.2:1, power to 110 hp (82 kW), and torque to 194 lb⋅ft (263 N⋅m), then to 196 lb⋅ft (266 N⋅m) in the -B3 of 1953, its final year. The 1948 to 1953 engines have a revised cooling and ignition system. Collectively all 239 engines are referred to as "100 horse" engines, although the horsepower was increased in 1952 to 110 horsepower in cars and 106 horsepower in trucks. This engine was used in Ford's transit buses during the most productive years of the company's short stint in the transit bus business from the mid-1930s to the early 1950s, most notably in the 1939–1947 version of the Ford Transit Bus.

The latest iteration of this engine was used from 1948 to 1953 in the U.S and till 1954 in Canada. It was initially designated the 8BA (see above) in automobiles and the 8RT in trucks. 8RT remained the truck engine designation throughout the entire run from 1948 through 1953 in the U.S (1954 in Canada). The engines were essentially identical. Earlier Ford V8s had the unique Ford designed distributor driven directly from the forward end of the camshaft, which was an inconvenient location for maintenance. This final flathead used a more conventional distributor driven at a right angle to the crankshaft and located at the right front of the engine where it was readily accessible. The water inlets and thermostat housings were moved to the front end of the heads, and the 21 studs and nuts that attached the heads on the old engine were replaced by 24 bolts.

=== 136 ===
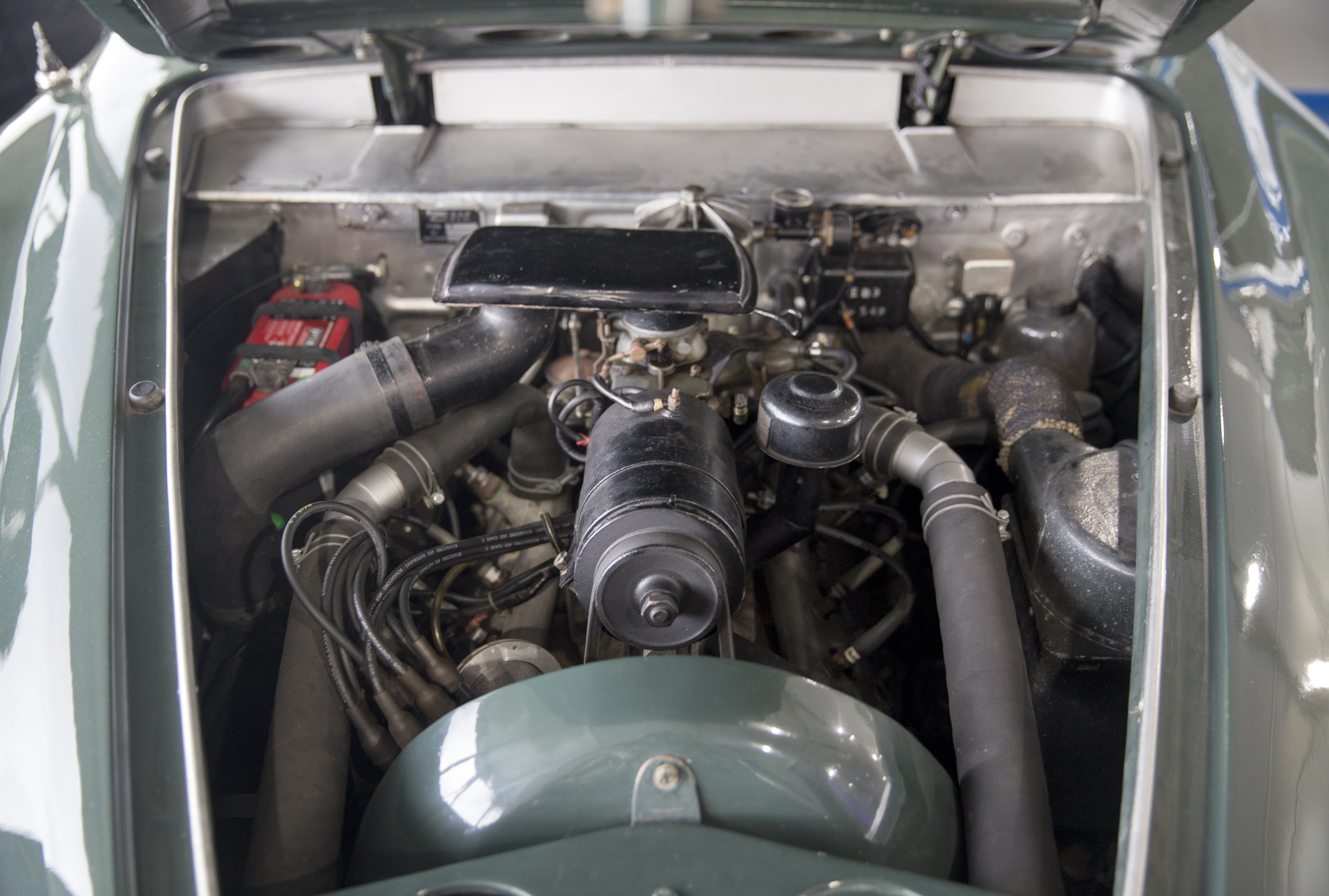
The 144ci Aquilon engine used by Ford France and later Simca

A 136 cu in (2.2 L) V8-74 version was introduced in the United States in 1937. With 2.6 by 3.2 in (66 by 81 mm) bore and stroke and 6.6:1 compression, the engine was rated 60 hp (45 kW) and 94 lb⋅ft (127 N⋅m). The designation changed again in 1939, to V8-922A, but the specifications remained the same. It was produced in Europe in 1935 and 1936, and was used in the many standard Ford vehicles based on the car platform of the era. It was not very popular with U.S. buyers who were used to the 85 hp (63 kW) cars. Redesignated V8-82A in 1938, V8-922A in 1939, and V8-022A in 1940, compression, power, and torque remained unchanged. The engine was very popular as a powerplant for midget race cars after World War II. This engine is most commonly referred to as the "60 horse" flathead, or the V8-60. It was replaced by the 226 straight-6 in the 1941 Fords, though it would continue to be used after the war in the French Ford Vedette and the British Ford Pilot.

In 1952 Ford France (who called this engine the Aquilon) created a somewhat bored out version displacing 144 cu in (2.4 L). Production was taken over by Simca in 1954 who began installing it in their Simca Vedette in 1955. Simca then transferred the Aquilon production line to Simca do Brasil, where it was kept in production until 1969 (the company was known as Chrysler Brazil from July 1967). Simca do Brasil introduced a 148 cu in (2.4 L) version in May 1962 but the real surprise was the 150 cu in (2.5 L) "Emi-Sul" of April 1966. This engine has overhead valves and hemispherical combustion chambers; it produced 138 hp (103 kW) in its most powerful version.

=== 255 ===
The 1948–1953 255 cu in (4.2 L), referred to as the model BG, was achieved by use of a 4 in (100 mm) stroke crankshaft in the 239 cu in (3.9 L) 8BA/8RT engine. It was only used in Mercury cars, and heavy service trucks. Known as the V8-9CM in 1949, it featured 6.8:1 compression, 110 hp (82 kW), and 200 lb⋅ft (271 N⋅m) torque, which stayed the same for the 1950 V8-0CM. The 1951 V8-1CM raised this by 2 hp (1 kW), and 6 lb⋅ft (8 N⋅m) torque, The 1952 V8-MA boosted compression to 7.2:1, power to 125 hp (93 kW), and torque to 218 lb⋅ft (296 N⋅m), while only the name changed, dropping the -MA, for the last year of production, 1953.

Because of interchangeability, the Mercury crank made a popular upgrade in the 239 among hot rodders. In fact, in the 1950s, the flathead block was often fitted with crankshafts of up to 4.125 in (104.8 mm) stroke. In addition, rodders in the 1950s routinely bored them out by 0.1875 in (4.76 mm) (to 3.375 in [85.7 mm]).

French-built 255 engines were fitted to the Simca Unic Marmon Bocquet (SUMB) light trucks of the French military. During the 1990s, the Ford V8 that was used in these trucks was decommissioned and removed for more economical Renault engines to be retrofitted. Thus the Ford V8 engines were sold off and thus provided a new source of little-worn engines for the hotrodding community. The block metallurgy, being much later, was also stronger than the originals.

=== 337 ===
The 337 cu in (5.5 L) flathead V8 was the largest production version of the Ford V8, designed for large truck service. When Lincoln could not produce the V12 engine for the 1949 model year, the 337 engine was adapted for passenger car use. The 337 features a 3.5 in (89 mm) bore and a 4.375 in (111.1 mm) stroke.

It was introduced in the 1948 two and a half ton and three ton Ford trucks and the 1949 Lincoln passenger cars. It was produced through the 1951 model year, and replaced in 1952 in Lincoln passenger cars and Ford three ton trucks with the 317 cu in (5.2 L) overhead-valve Lincoln Y-block V8. The two and a half ton Ford trucks got a 279 cu in (4.6 L) version of the 317 engine.

In the song "Hot Rod Lincoln", the engine referred to in the original lyrics was a Lincoln V12, not mentioned in the Commander Cody version.

- Vehicles used
  - Lincoln (EL-series)
  - Lincoln Cosmopolitan
  - Ford F-Series "Big Job"

== See also ==
- List of Ford engines
- Universal Carrier, the most-produced of all WWII tracked military vehicles, powered with Ford flathead V8 engines.

== Sources ==
- Shelton, Chris. "Then, Now, and Forever" in Hot Rod, March 2017, pp. 16–29.

== Bibliography ==
- Axworthy, Mark (1995). Third Axis – Fourth Ally: Romanian Armed Forces in the European War, 1941-1945. London: Arms and Armour. ISBN 9781854092670.
- Bishop, Mike; Tardel, Vern (2015). How to Rebuild & Modify Ford Flathead V-8 Engines. Motorbooks Workshop. Motorbooks. ISBN 978-0760343999.
- Leffingwell, Randy (2002) [1998], Ford Tractors, Borders, ISBN 0-681-87878-9.
- Sorensen, Charles E. (1956), My Forty Years with Ford, New York: W. W. Norton, LCCN 56010854, OCLC 912748. Various republications, including ISBN 9780814332795.
- Kremser, Hans (1942), Hans List (ed.), Der Aufbau schnellaufender Verbrennungskraftmaschinen für Kraftfahrzeuge und Triebwagen, Die Verbrennungskraftmaschine (in German), vol. 11, Wien: Springer, pp. 214–216, ISBN 978-3-7091-9755-4
