= Henri Pigozzi =

Italian founder of the Simca car company (1898–1964)

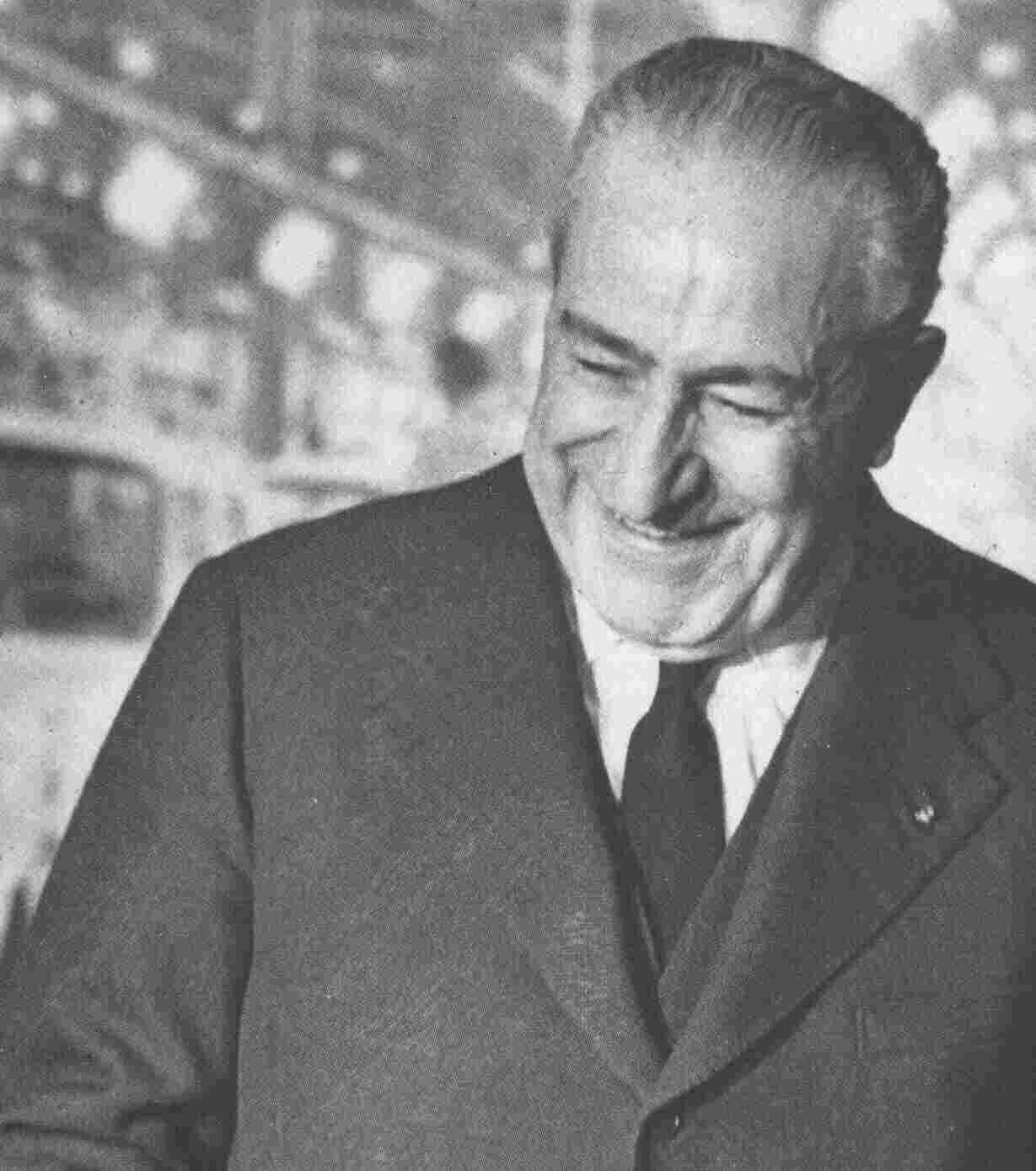

Henri Théodore Pigozzi (born Enrico Teodoro Pigozzi; 26 June 1898, in Turin – 18 November 1964, in Neuilly-sur-Seine) was a car dealer and an automotive industrialist who is best known for having founded Société Industrielle de Mécanique et Carrosserie Automobile (Simca).

In 1912 his father disappeared, leaving Pigozzi, then aged 14, to take responsibility for his mother, his sister, and a small transport business.

In 1918, after the war, he secured the distribution rights for British and US motorcycles in the Piedmont region, selling surplus machines from the military stocks of the allied armies. Between 1920 and 1922 he worked for a firm that imported coal from the Saarland. In 1924 he set up his own business, importing scrap steel from France which was needed by the Piedmontese steel mills. The principal customer for steel in the region was Fiat and in 1922 Pigozzi was introduced to Giovanni Agnelli, the owner of Fiat. Agnelli was particularly interested in Pigozzi because at the time he was looking for a general commercial representative in France. Pigozzi was already familiar with the French industrial scene, and in 1926, when aged only 28, Pigozzi was appointed as Fiat's General Representative in France.

In the same year, he established a new distributing company named SAFAF (Société Anonyme Français des Automobiles FIAT) in Suresnes (near Paris) for importing and later, for assembling Italian Fiat cars. From 1928 to 1934, about 30,000 FIATs were assembled and sold by him in his capacity as Director General of SAFAF.

Pigozzi bought the premises at Nanterre of the defunct Donnet-Zédel car manufacturing company, and on 2 November 1934 he established there the Société Industrielle de Mécanique et de Carrosserie Automobile, known as Simca. He ran Simca for nearly three decades, as Director General between 1935 and 1954 and as President-Director General between 1954 and 1963, which was when Chrysler, a minority share holder since buying 15% from Ford in 1958, increased their share-holding in the business to 64% and took control.

On 31 May 1963, with Chrysler in control, he was obliged to resign from the presidency of Simca.

According to his son Jean (see below), all three of Henri's children were borne by his mistress but raised by his wife, Loisette, as her own. (Cite profile by Ingrid Sischy, "Living Large Is The Best Revenge", Vanity Fair, December 2010)

He died suddenly, aged 66 from a heart-attack at Neuilly-sur-Seine, a suburb of Paris, on 18 November 1964, eighteen months later.

== See also ==
- Jean Pigozzi, son of Henri Pigozzi, art collector and philanthropist

== Sources ==
- Jean-Paul Rousseau und Jaques Rousseau: Simca Histoire d’une marque, Fontainebleau 1996 ISBN 2-84078-039-9
