= Simca Rush engine =

Overview
- Production: 1960-1964

Layout
- Configuration: Straight-four
- Displacement: 79 cubic inches (1,290 cc)
- Cylinder bore: 75.2mm
- Piston stroke: 83mm
- Cylinder block material: Cast iron
- Cylinder head material: Alloy
- Valvetrain: OHV 2 valves per cyl.
- Valvetrain drive system: Timing gears

Combustion
- Fuel system: Carburetor
- Fuel type: Gasoline
- Oil system: Wet sump
- Cooling system: Water-cooled

Output
- Power output: 70.9 PS (70 hp; 52 kW)

Chronology
- Predecessor: Simca Flash engine
- Successor: Simca Poissy engine Simca Type 342 and 345 Engines

The Simca Rush engine was an Overhead valve Inline 4-cylinder engine produced by Simca at their Poissy Plant from 1960 until 1964 and was used in the Simca Aronde. The engine displaced 1290 cubic centimeters (1.3L) and featured an all new five-bearing crankshaft the engine produced up to 57 Hp (43 kW) in standard form, however the upgraded Rush Super M pumped out up to 70 Hp (53 kW).

The Rush engine was always backed by a 4-speed manual transmission, a rarity in the era.

== See also ==
- Simca
- Stellantis Poissy Plant
- Simca Aronde
