= Simca 1300/1500 =

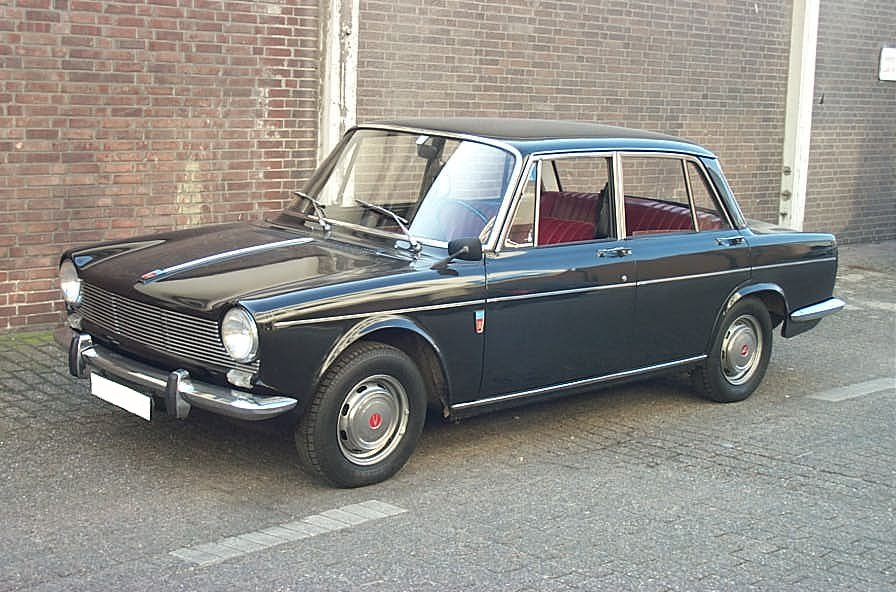
- 1964 Simca 1500 saloon

Overview
- Manufacturer: Simca
- Also called: Simca 1301/1501
- Production: 1963–1975
- Assembly: France: Poissy (Poissy Plant)

Body and chassis
- Class: Large family car (D)
- Body style: 4-door saloon 5-door estate
- Layout: FR layout

Powertrain
- Engine: 1.3 L Rush OHB I4; 1.5 L OHV I4

Dimensions
- Wheelbase: 99 in (2,500 mm)
- Length: 175.5 in (4,460 mm); 1301 / 1501 saloon 169.5 in (4,310 mm); 1301 / 1501 estate
- Width: 62 in (1,600 mm)
- Height: 55 in (1,400 mm) unladen

Chronology
- Predecessor: Simca Aronde
- Successor: Simca 1301/1501

The Simca 1300 and Simca 1500 are large family cars manufactured by the French automaker Simca in its Poissy factory from 1963 to 1966 and between 1966 and 1975 in revamped versions, as the Simca 1301 and 1501.

The two models were essentially versions of the same car, fitted with either a 1.3-litre or 1.5-litre engine, hence the model names. Apart from different engines and differences in standard equipment, the models were for the most part identical, bar some styling details such as grille or bumpers. The 1300 grille comprised nine horizontal and three vertical bars whereas the 1500 grille featured eleven horizontal bars only. This model series replaced the popular, long-running Simca Aronde and was initially available only with a 4-door saloon body, but in 1964 the 1500 gained an estate version (1300 estate followed in 1965).

The estate versions had some interesting features. All had split tailgates - the rear windscreen would wind down into the bottom part, which could then be folded down. On the one hand, this allowed the access to the cargo compartment without opening the full tailgate. On the other, this meant that a rear window heater could never be installed in estates. Additionally, the 1500 GL version's cargo floor, which doubled as the cover for the spare wheel (stowed flat), could be removed and, thanks to four folding legs, converted into a picnic table. A 1500 Familial version had two child seats (facing each other) in the cargo compartment, and a luggage rack on the roof.

While being quite popular, especially in France and Germany, those Simcas can be remembered for some quirks regarding both series. The 1300/1500 came with column shift for left-hand drive markets, but the right-hand drive versions were converted to floor shift. The conversion for some reason resulted in a "mirror" shift pattern, with the first and second gear being closer to the driver, and the third and fourth farther to the left.

Moreover, the 1500 GLA model, which was initially the sole in the range featuring automatic transmission, was at first available in metallic brown only. A similar situation concerned the interior carpets, which would come deep red regardless of the exterior color.

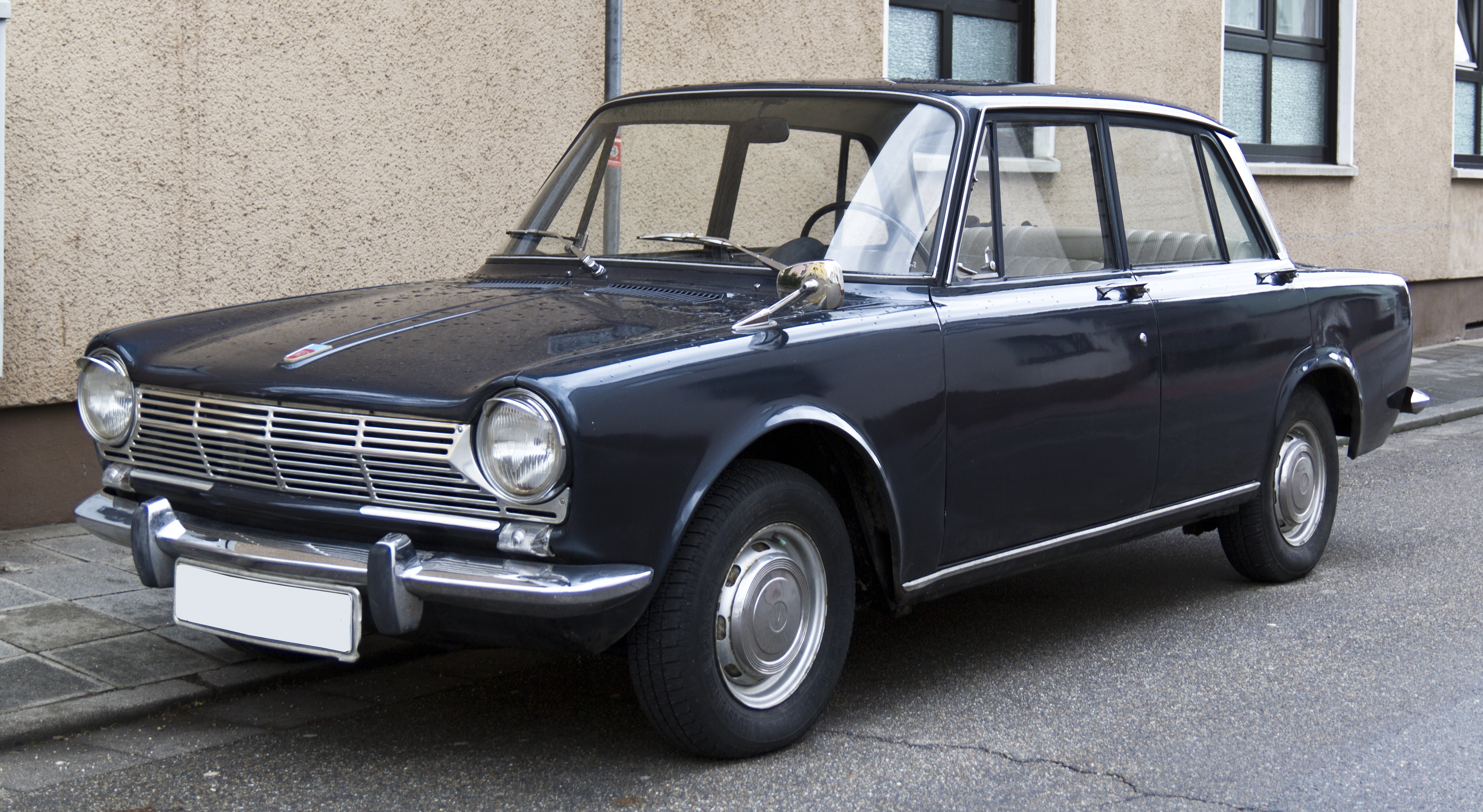
Simca 1300 Saloon (Series 1)

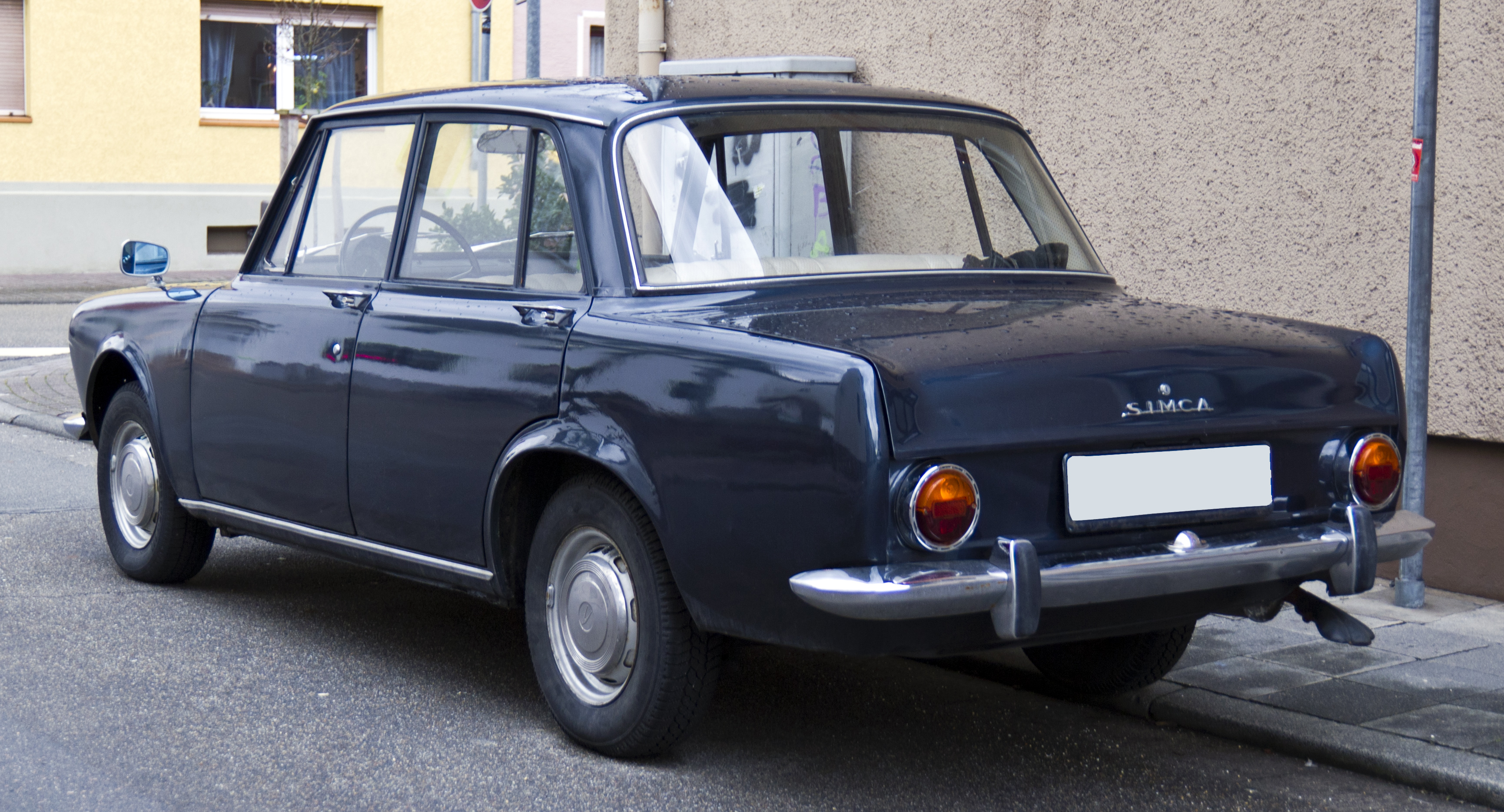
Simca 1300 Saloon

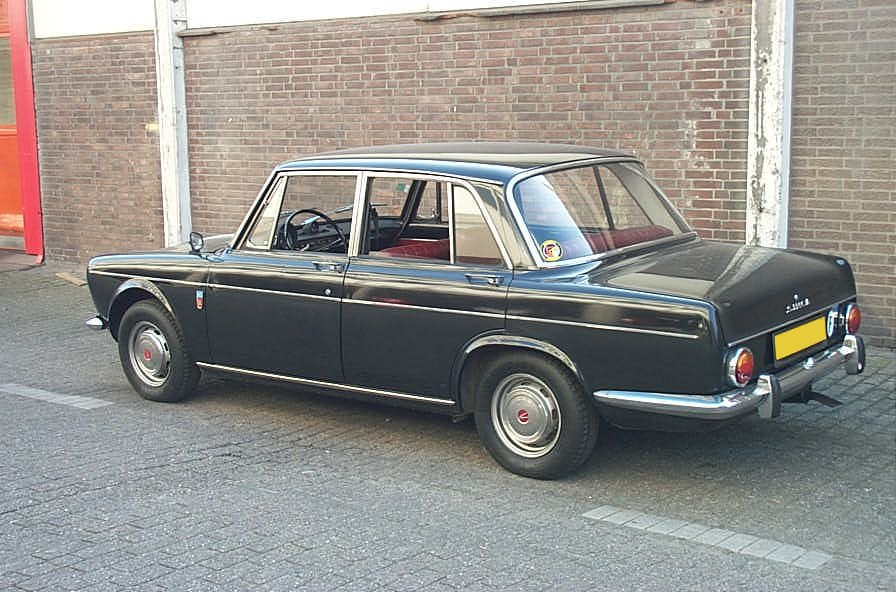
Simca 1500 (rear view)

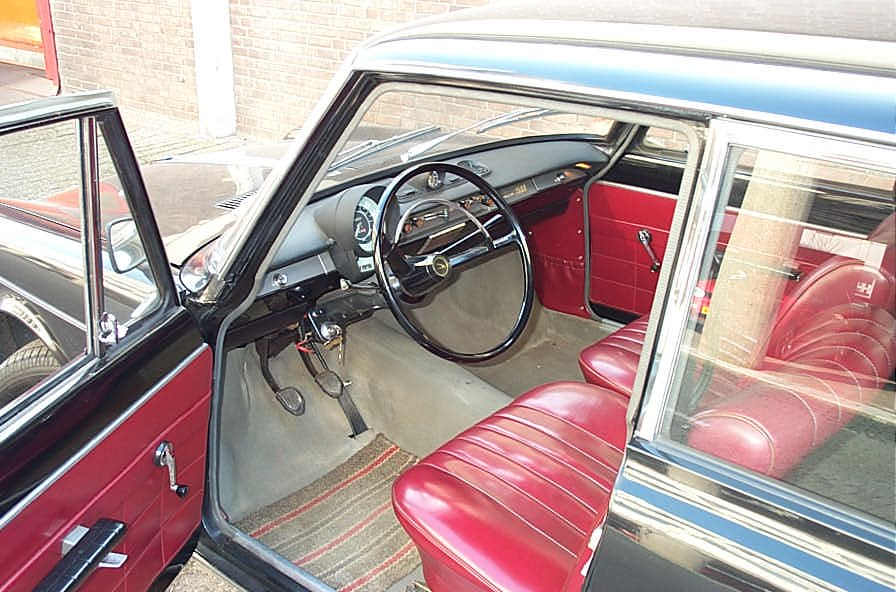
Simca 1500 (interior)

== Simca 1300/1500 in film ==
The Simca 1300/1500 is ubiquitous in the movie Playtime. Jacques Tati used the same cars in dark and grey colours as a visual cue to illustrate the uniformity of modern life in his fictional Paris.
