= Simca 9 =

Simca 9 Sport
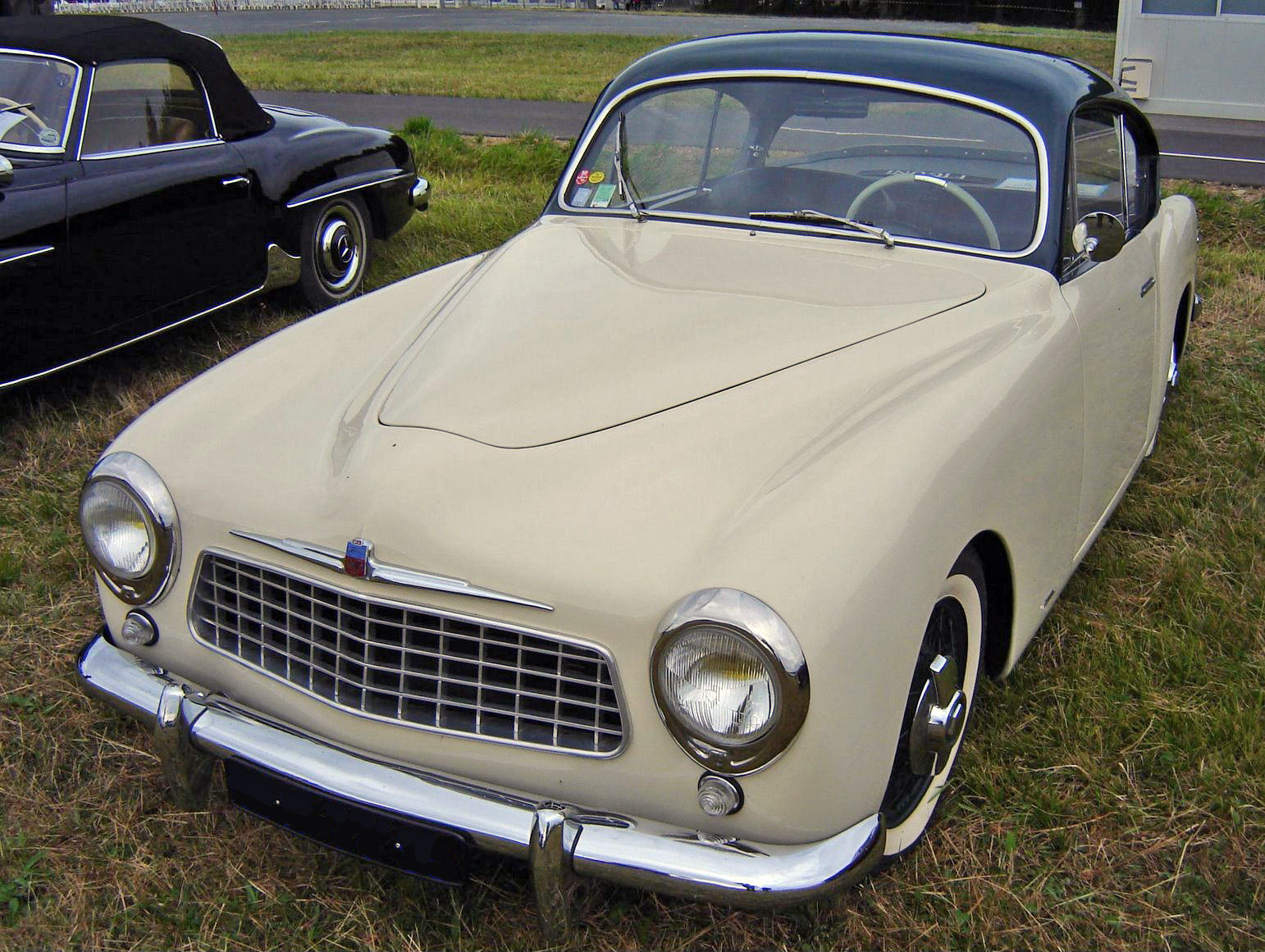
- Figoni et Falaschi-bodied Simca 9 Sport coupé

Overview
- Production: 1952–1954

Body and chassis
- Body style: 2-door hardtop coupé 2-door convertible (rare)

Powertrain
- Engine: 1221 cc ohv I4
- Transmission: four-speed manual

Dimensions
- Wheelbase: 2,443 mm (96.2 in)
- Length: 4,150 mm (163.4 in)
- Curb weight: 945 kg (2,083 lb)

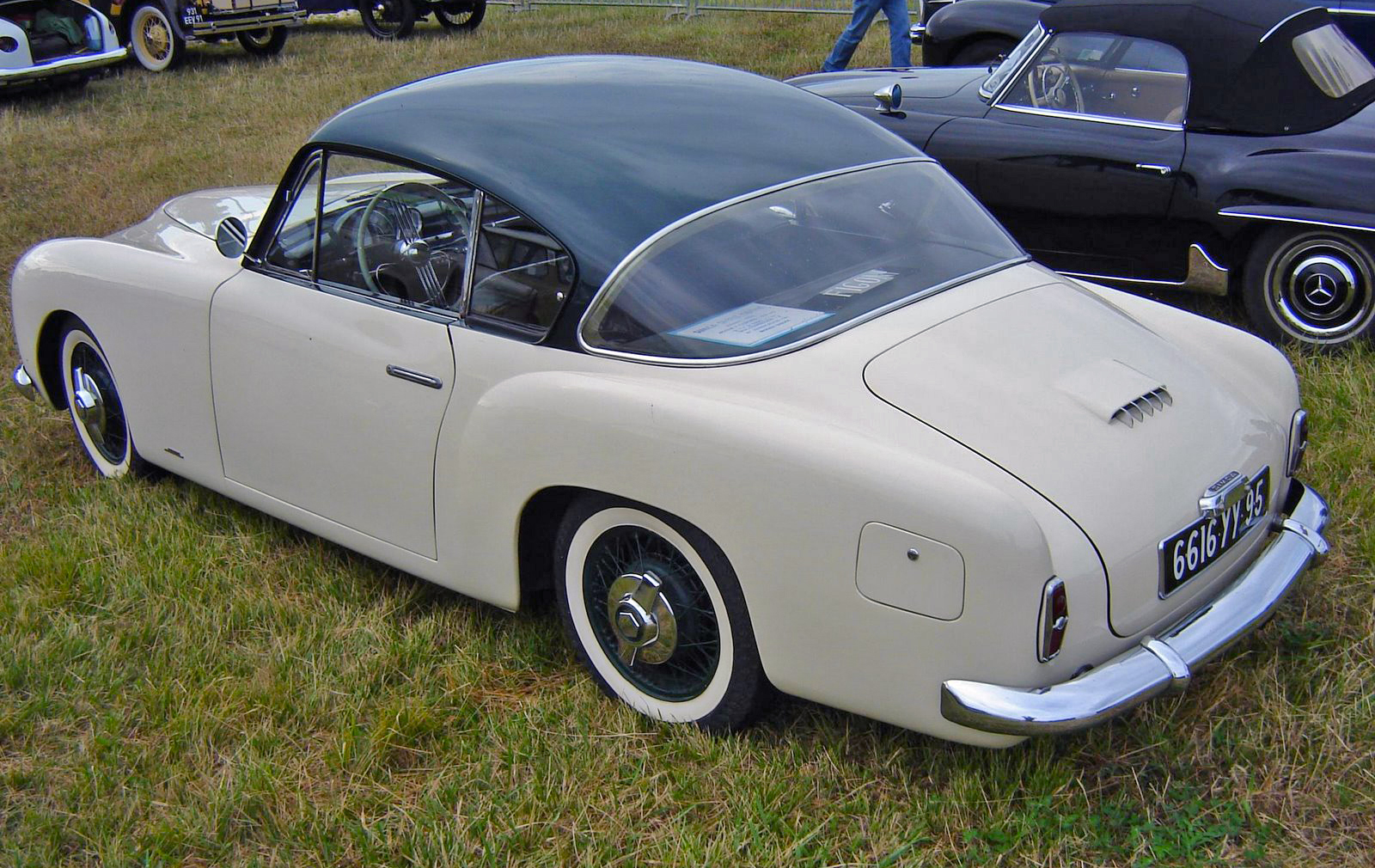
1954 Simca 9 Sport Figoni et Falaschi rear view

The Simca 9 is a French sports car produced by French automaker Simca. It first appeared in June 1952 and was built until 1954. It was a development of the Simca 8, from which it differed by being lengthened a bit (a few centimetres or inches) between the rear edge of the door and the bulge of the rear fender, to provide more interior room. More importantly, the 9 Sport was of a unibody design. This meant that the car was not offered as a convertible, although a small number of 9 Sport convertibles were built, using the chassis of the earlier 8 Sport. The mechanics were the same as for the Simca Aronde, although the engine was upgraded from 45 to 50 CV (33 to 37 kW). Its running gear was similar to that of the Simca 8 Sport, with the same iteration of the engine, benefitting from a higher compression ratio. The car was built by Facel-Métallon in Colombes. In September 1952, the 1953 Simca 9 Sport featured all-new bodywork, curvier and with more glazing. Again, it featured steel bodywork of Facel's manufacture, and, again, it was heavier and thus no faster than the Aronde sedan on which the expensive Sport was based. A single convertible prototype was built. For model year 1954 the only difference was redesigned hubcaps with a stylized "S". The 9 Sport name was then retired as of September 1954. In 1955, the car was renamed the Simca Coupé de Ville (with the same bodywork), with full equipment and downplaying the "sport" aspect.

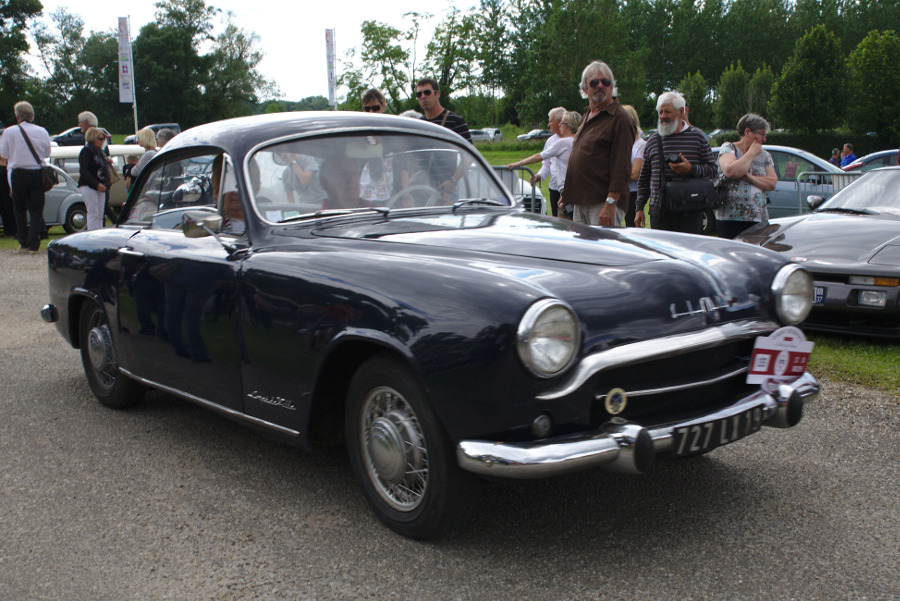
1955 Simca Coupé de Ville, with the Facel bodywork as used since late 1952.
