= Simca 1301/1501 =

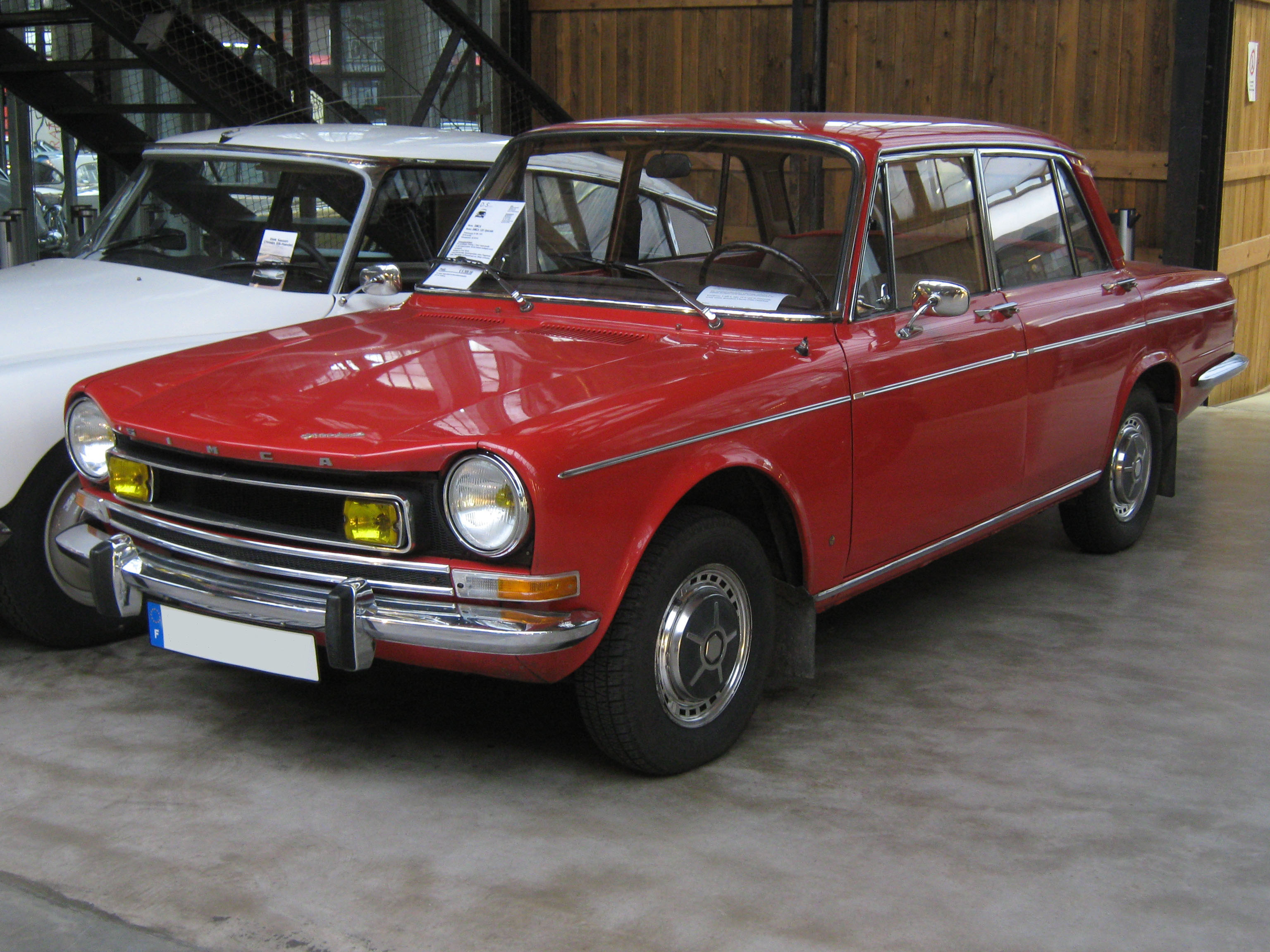
- Simca 1301 Special

Overview
- Manufacturer: Simca
- Production: 1966–1975
- Assembly: France: Poissy (Poissy Plant)

Body and chassis
- Class: Large family car (D)
- Body style: 4-door saloon 5-door estate
- Layout: FR layout

Powertrain
- Engine: 1.3 L Rush OHV I4; 1.3 L Type 345 OHV I4; 1.5 L Type 342 OHV I4

Dimensions
- Wheelbase: 99 in (2,500 mm)
- Length: 175.5 in (4,460 mm); 1301 / 1501 saloon 169.5 in (4,310 mm); 1301 / 1501 estate
- Width: 62 in (1,600 mm)
- Height: 55 in (1,400 mm) unladen

Chronology
- Predecessor: Simca 1300/1500
- Successor: Simca 1307

The Simca 1301 and Simca 1501 are two related automobiles which were produced by the French automaker Simca from 1966 to 1975.

== History ==
As a replacement to the older 1300 and 1500 models, the 1301 and 1501 models were first announced to the public in October 1966. The first public preview presentation to the press took place on August 31 of that year. The 1301 and 1501 models were the natural evolution of the previous 1300 and 1500 models with which they shared engines and mechanical parts.

=== Features ===
Compared to the two predecessors, the 1301 and 1501 kept the same chassis design and general shape, although the models were modernised with facelifted front and rear ends. They are both characterised by the same 3 square four door saloon and 2 square 4 door wagon body styles. The most obvious design differences with the 1300 and 1500 models were in the front and rear ends of the car: the front end was facelifted and ended up longer by 69mm, while the rear end on the sedan bodies was increased as well, by 135mm (although the rear end of the station wagon models remained unchanged). The result was that 1301 and 1501 sedan models were 210mm longer than the older 1300 and 1500 models. These differences were both in the front, where the models were given a redesign in the grille and indicator area, and also in the rear for the sedans, where they received an updated and longer rear end design with horizontal taillights (as opposed to circular) and an in general longer design. Differences stand out in the interior with the instrument panel that has a new horizontal and straight design for the new models. Despite the disappearance of some luxuries such as the courtesy light inside, Simca did improve the overall quality and comfort of the seats and their upholstery.

At first, the engines used were the same from the 1300 and 1500 models, although they had in part been updated. The 1301 was equipped with the 1,290 cc, 4-cylinder "Rush" engine from the 1300, with overhead valves, which was powered by a single barrel carburettor. It was capable of delivering 54 hp DIN and allowed the car to reach a top speed of 135 km/h. Similarly, the Simca 1501 was equipped with the Type 342 engine of the 1500, a 1,475 cc 4-cylinder originally powered by a single barrel carburettor, and capable of delivering 69 hp DIN. The maximum speed for the 1501 was improved slightly, reaching 147 km/h in its earliest rendition.

=== Range and trim levels ===
At the start of production, the range of the 1301 and 1501 models was composed as follows:

- 1301 Sedan and 1501 Sedan, with the trim levels LS, GL and GLS;
- 1301 Break and 1501 Break, a station wagon with the trim levels LS and GLS;
- 1301 Familiale and 1501 Familiale, a station wagon with only one trim level, LS;

=== Evolution ===
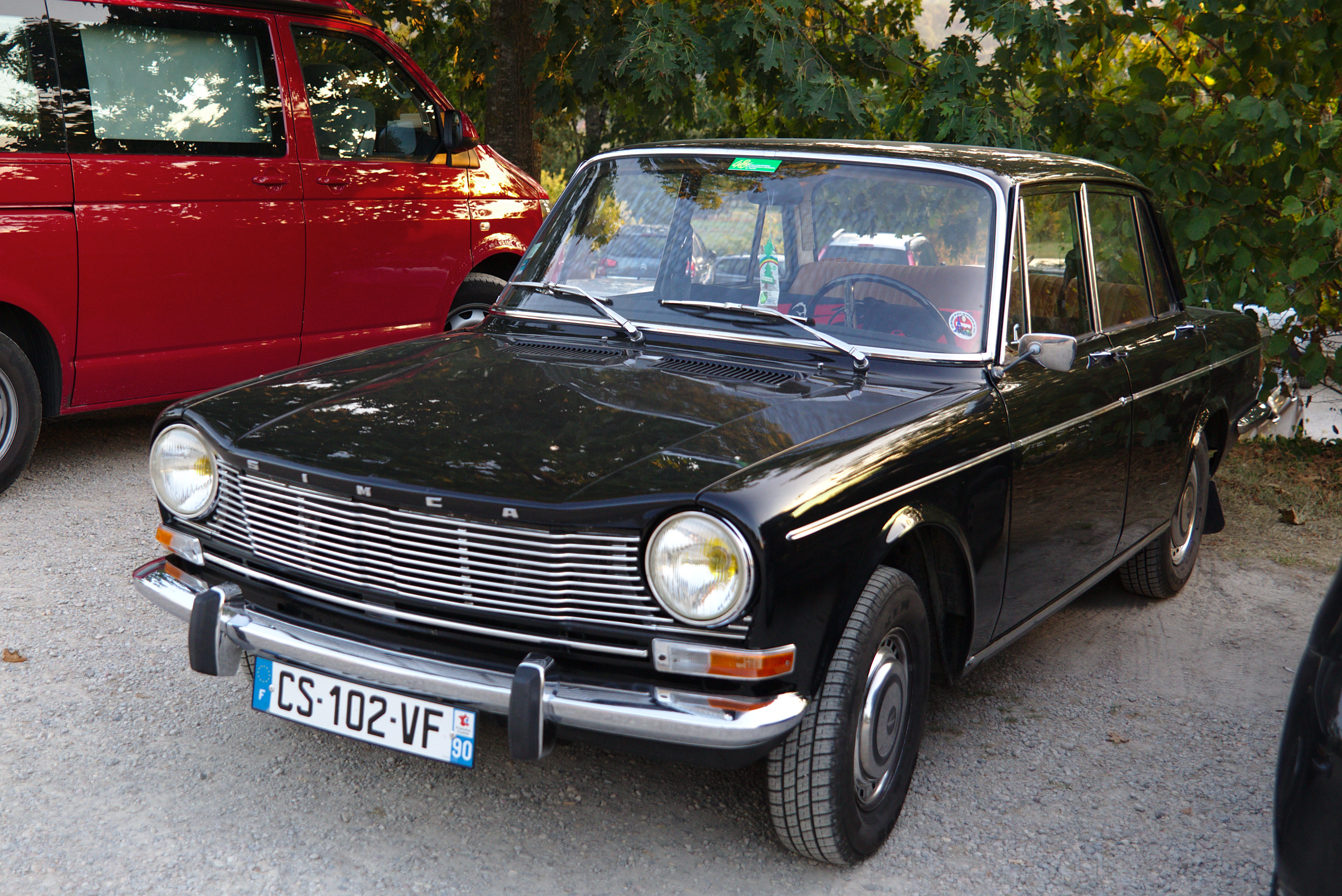
Simca 1301

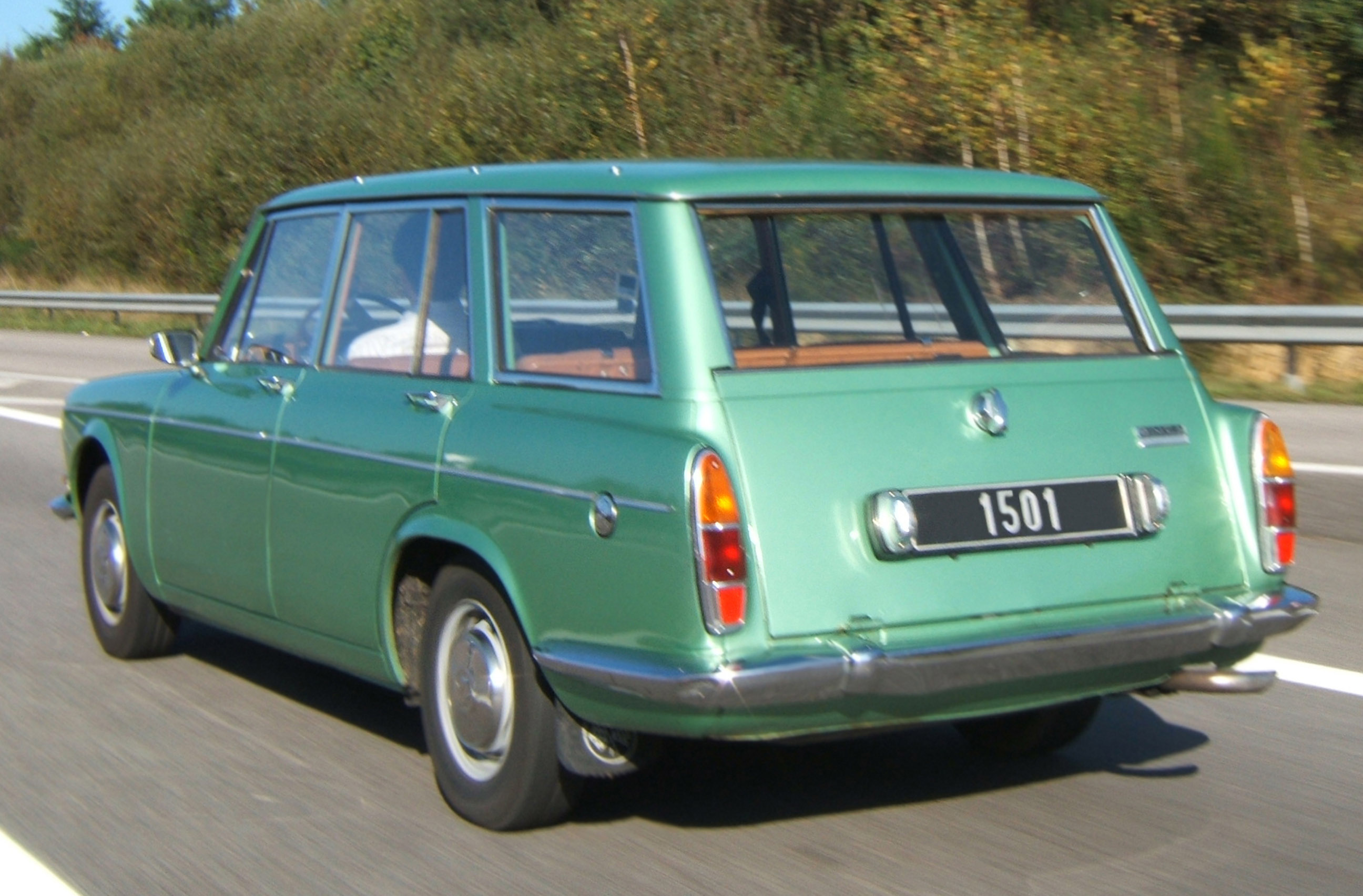
Simca 1501 Break

The first deliveries began in late 1966 and early 1967. Like with the 1300 and the 1500, the new 1301 and 1501 came with a two-year warranty on the engine, gearbox and suspension. This was done in order to attract new customers and establish the commercial success of the two models.

In March 1967, the range was expanded with the arrival of the 1301U, an unprecedented version of the car, a "van", a station wagon with the rear windows replaced by sheet metal, only two seats, and a rear passenger compartment completely emptied to make it a load compartment. However, it was quick to disappear from the lineup with its removal in the autumn of 1968, as it received little interest as a commercial vehicle.

In the autumn of 1968 the range was further revised and simplified: the Sedan 1301 LS and GL trims remained, while the 1301 Break and Familiale were merged into a single model, the 1301 Break GL. As for the 1501, the LS and GLS trims were removed from the lineup, leaving in the existing lineup only the GL and the new 1501 Special, which was also available as station wagon. The 1501 Special was equipped with a redesigned version of the Type 342 engine that came in the GL, the Type 342S, which had a revised head design and came with a double barrel carburettor. The type 342s delivered 81 hp DIN, and had a top speed of 160 km/h. The special also came equipped standard with a sporty steering wheel, power brakes, and an increased rear differential ratio.

In September 1969 here was another redesign for the 1501, focused mainly on the front end of the car, where it got a completely redesigned grille which now incorporated a pair of fog lights as factory equipment. The 1301, however, on the outside, remained unchanged. Internally, for the whole range there was a new dashboard and a new instrument panel design with round elements (two for the 1301 and four for 1501), and also a slot for a radio. Another significant change in the interior was the use of matching fabrics. Mechanically, all the 1501 trims were upgraded with the 342S engine with 81 hp, which had until then only equipped the Special. The Special now only differed from the other trims in interior and equipment.

In early 1970, the 1301 saw its Rush engine replaced by a more modern engine based on the Type 342: the Type 345. The Type 342 was a debored version of the Type 342 engine, with only 1290cc, which now came in all standard 1301 models, delivering 60 hp DIN. The 1301 Special was also introduced which would come with the Type 342S, a version of the Type 342 with a twin barrel carb and increased compression, delivering 70 hp DIN. This was in essence the only real change regarding the 1301 range since its debut. Other improvements increased the reliability, and lowered fuel consumption. The 60 hp 1.3 engine went to equip the only other 1301 sedan trim which remained, the LS. The LS remained in the lineup until August, only to be replaced by 1301, without additional acronyms. In September 1970, the French domestic range was as follows:

- 1301, with the 1.3 litre, 60 hp engine;
- 1301 Special, with the 1.3 litre, 70 hp engine;
- 1301 Break Special, with the 1.3 litre, 70 hp engine;
- 1501 Break Special, with the 1.5 litre, 81 hp engine.

Note the disappearance of the sedan 1501, ordered by Chrysler (which now held a 95% stake in the Simca) to not hinder the commercial career of the Type 160. Still, during this time many 1501 models with sedan bodywork were produced for foreign markets, now marketed as the 1501 GLE, where the E was for export.

In 1971, the new grille for the Special was also adopted by the 1301. This was part of a standardisation program by Chrysler Europe, which aimed to standardize production of as many Simca models as possible, to reduce costs and increase profits. What also appeared in 1971 was the wing mirror on all models and a new steering wheel with a safety soft centre. Amongst the new options for the car, the vinyl roof should be mentioned, which was added to emphasize the luxury of the car. In the same year however, for the French market, the 1301 base and the 1501 break models left the lineup. Now the range for the French market was composed solely of the 1301 Spécial in sedan and break versions.

In 1972 there were only small updates to the range for the 1301, aimed essentially to the interior (introduction of a cigarette lighter, rear-view antiglare, better internal soundproofing, etc.) and however minor changes were made too to the mechanics (a strengthened gearbox, disc rear brakes, etc.).

In 1973, there were more substantial changes: the lack of success encountered by the Type 160 in the French market pushed the leaders of Chrysler to resume production of the 1501, then returned to the list as the Special (and in both body variants), but with its engine detuned to 73 hp. For the 1301 not to stand too close to the "big sister", it was deprived of some horsepower and went from 70 to 67 hp. The detuning of all the models, however, was mainly to decrease fuel consumption, given the oil crisis which erupted in that year.

The only notable update for 1974 was the introduction of reverse lights for the entire range, which became obligatory from September of that year. There was also another, but much less visible change: in the 1501 the power was now down to 71 hp.

In 1975 Simca presented the 1307, 1308 and 1309. In July the 1301 production was stopped, it was followed in September by the 1501, but the range still persisted enough to face its last Paris Motor Show in 1975. In January of 1976 the production of the Break also stopped, while the last examples, in both body configurations, were sold off by the first half of the year.

=== Summary characteristics ===
The following summarizes the characteristics of the various versions of the range of 1301/1501:

Simca 1301 / 1501
Model	Bodywork	Trim	Engine	Displacement cm³	Power hp DIN/rpm	Torque (Nm/rpm)	Empty mass (kg)	Top speed (km/h)	Years in production
1301	Sedan	LS, GL and GLS	Type 312T (Rush)	1290	54/5200	87/2600	990	135	1966-69
1301	Sedan	LS	Type 345	1290	60/5400	87.3/4300	990	140	02/1970-08/1970
1301	Sedan	base	Type 345	1290	60/5400	87.3/4300	990	140	1970-71
1301	Sedan	Spécial	Type 345S	1290	70/5400	88.3/4600	1.010	152	1970-73
1301	Sedan	Spécial	2L2	1290	67/5400	99/4000	1.010	152	1973-75
1301	Station Wagon	LS, LS Familiale, GLS	Type 312T (Rush)	1290	54/5200	87/2600	1.150	130	1967-68
1301	Station Wagon	GL	Type 312T (Rush)	1290	54/5200	87/2600	1.150	130	1968-69
1301	Station Wagon	Spécial	Type 345S	1290	70/5400	88.3/4600	1.170	145	1970-73
1301	Station Wagon	Spécial	2L2	1290	67/5400	99/4000	1.170	143	1973-75
1501	Sedan	LS, GL, GLS	Type 342	1475	69/5200	100/2600	1.010	147	1966-68
1501	Sedan	GL	Type 342S	1475	81/5200	122/4000	1.020	160	1968-70
1501	Sedan	Spécial	Type 342S	1475	81/5200	122/4000	1.020	160	1968-70
1501	Sedan	Spécial	2N2	1475	73/5100	114/3600	1.020	160	1973-75
1501	Station Wagon	LS, LS Familiale, GLS	Type 342	1475	69/5200	100/2600	1.190	142	1967-68
1501	Station Wagon	GL	Type 342	1475	69/5200	100/2600	1.190	142	1968-69
1501	Station Wagon	GL	Type 342S	1475	81/5200	122/4000	1.210	150	1969-71
1501	Station Wagon	Spécial	Type 342S	1475	81/5200	122/4000	1.210	150	1968-71
1501	Station Wagon	Spécial	2N2	1475	73/5100	114/3600	1.210	142	1973-74
1501	Station Wagon	Spécial	2N2	1475	71/5000	114/3600	1.210	140	1974-75
