= Simca Type 342 and 345 Engines =

The Simca Type 342 and 345 Engines were four-cylinder OHV engines, produced from 1963 through 1975, and used in the Simca mid-size 1501/1301 chassis. It was developed and produced by Simca in the early 1960s to be used in the Simca 1500.

The engine was originally designed in a 1475 cc form (known as the Type 342), but was later reduced to a 1290 cc form (known as the Type 345) to replace the old 1.3 litre rush engine in the 1301 models in 1969.

== Type 342 ==
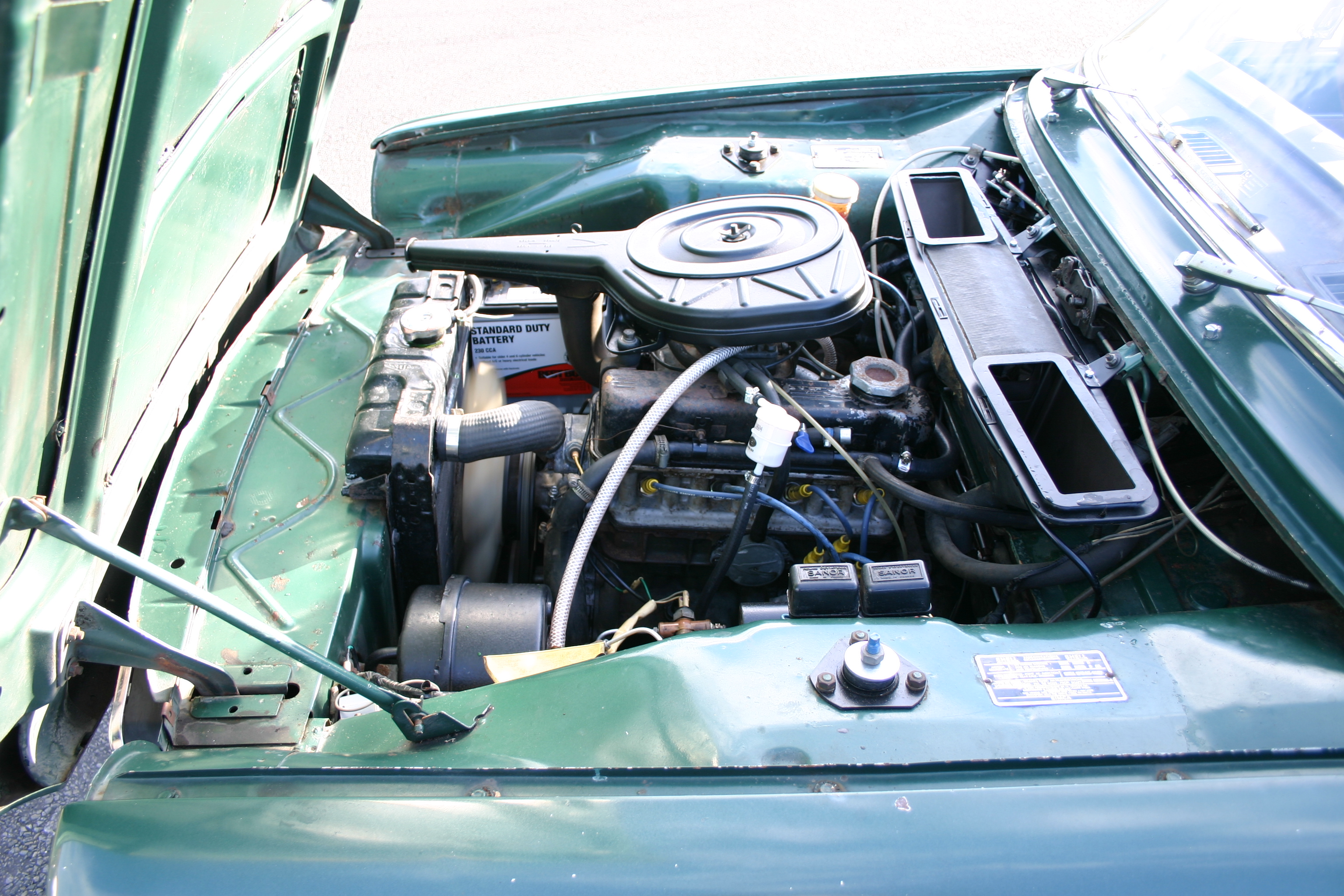
The engine bay of a 1970 Simca 1501 Special with a Type 342S.

The Type 342 engine was designed in 1963 and built to equip the Simca 1500, which debuted at the end of that year. It subsequently also powered the Simca 1501, which would replace the 1500 in 1967 .

The Type 342 was a new engine, unrelated to the 1.3-liter Rush and Flash engines, and the result of an completely different design.

However, features common in different Simca engines that came before it had been retained, namely:

- A 4-cylinder design;
- Dimensional setting of sub-frame type;
- Overhead Valve distribution with lateral cam axle;
- Water cooling.

The biggest revolution in the engine's construction was the new larger capacity of the engine. It had a bore and stroke of 75.2 x 83 mm, which achieved a displacement of 1475 cm^{3} .

The Type 342 was powered by Weber or Solex carburetors.

During its career it was offered in four variants:

The first variant, which was introduced in 1963, delivered a maximum power of 69 PS DIN (81 HP SAE) at 5000 rpm, while the maximum torque reached 100 Nm at 2600 rpm. This first variant, known commonly as the Type 342, was mounted on:

- Simca 1500 (1963–67);
- Simca 1501 GL (1967–70);
- Simca 1501 LS / GLS (1967–71).

The second variant was the one reserved for the 1501 with automatic transmission and was used throughout the production of the 1501 range. This engine, known commonly as the Type 342B, delivered a maximum power of 72 HP at 5200 rpm.

The third variant, which was introduced in 1969, delivered a maximum power of 81 PS DIN (95 HP SAE) at 5200 rpm, while the maximum torque reached 122 Nm at 4000 rpm. This increase of power was due to an overhaul in the engine's design, such as rebuilding the head and combustion chambers and the inclusion of a double barrel Weber or Solex carburetor. This second variant, known commonly as the Type 342S, was mounted on:

- Simca 1501 Spécial (1969–70);
- Simca 1501 GL (1969–70).

The fourth and final variant of the Type 342 engine, which was introduced in 1973, delivered a maximum power of 73 PS DIN (84 HP SAE) at 5100 rpm, while the maximum torque reached 114 Nm at 3600 rpm. This version was introduced three years after the removal of the 1501 range from the Simca lineup. With the failure of the Chrysler 160/180, which was originally conceived by Chrysler (then the owner of the Simca brand) to replace the 1501, the engine was reintroduced with the revival of the 1501 range. The oil crisis of that year, however, forced Simca to reduce the power from 81 HP to 73 HP, to fuel better economy and emissions. In this new configuration, the engine took the 2N2 designation, consistent with the new naming standards imposed by Chrysler for Simca.

== Type 345 ==
The Type 345 engine was designed in 1969 to replace the old 1.3 litre Rush engine (originally designed for use in the Simca Aronde) still used in the Simca 1301 models. Despite the link between the displacement of the Rush engine and Type 345 (in either engine 1290 cc), the two engines were not at all related. The Type 345 was in fact a reduced bore version of 1.5 litre Type 342 already mounted on 1500 and 1501. The bore diameter of the four-cylinder in-line was reduced from 75.2 to 70.3 mm, while the stroke remained unchanged at 83 mm.

During its career it was offered in three variants:

The first variant, introduced in 1970, delivered a maximum power of 60 HP at 5400 rpm, while the maximum torque reached 87.3 Nm at 4300 rpm. This variant was powered by a double body carburetor and had a compression ratio of 8.7:1. This first variant, known commonly as the Type 345, was mounted on:

- Simca 1301 (February 1970 – September 1971);
- Simca 1301 LS (February 1970 – September 1971);

The second variant, introduced in 1970, delivered a maximum power of 70 HP at 5400 rpm, while the maximum torque reached 88.3 Nm at 4800 rpm. This variant was powered by a double barrel carburetor and had an increased compression ratio of 9.1:1. This first variant, known commonly as the Type 345S, was mounted only on the Simca 1301 Spécial, produced from 1970 to 1973.

The third and final variant, introduced in 1973, delivered a maximum power of 67 HP at 5400 rpm, while the maximum torque reached 99 Nm at 4000 rpm. This variant was slightly de-tuned compared to the earlier variants with a decrease in max horsepower and compression ratio (8.8:1) compared to the Type 345S, however the maximum torque was significantly increased. This final variant took the 2L2 designation, and was mounted on the last Simca 1301 produced from 1973 to 1975.

== See also ==
- Simca
- Simca 1300/1500
- Simca 1301/1501
