= Simca Aronde =

- Simca Aronde 4-door saloon (P60)

Overview
- Manufacturer: Simca
- Production: 1951–1964
- Assembly: France: Poissy (Poissy Plant); Australia: Mile End; Australia: Adelaide (Chrysler Australia)

Body and chassis
- Body style: 4-door saloon; 2-door hardtop coupé; 2-door coupé; 2-door convertible; 3-door estate; 2-door pickup; 2-door van; 5-door estate (Australia)
- Layout: FR layout

Powertrain
- Engine: 1.1 L OHV I4; 1.2 L OHV I4; 1.3 L Flash OHV I4; 1.3 L Rush OHV I4

Chronology
- Predecessor: Simca 8
- Successor: Simca 1300/1500

The Simca Aronde is an automobile which was manufactured by the French automaker Simca from 1951 to 1964. It was Simca's first original design (earlier models were all to a greater or lesser extent based on Fiats), as well as the company's first unibody car. "Aronde" means "swallow" in Old French and it was chosen as the name for the model because Simca's logo at that time was a stylized swallow.

== The three generations ==
There were three generations of the model: the 9 Aronde, made from 1951 to 1955, the 90A Aronde, made from 1955 to 1958, and the Aronde P60, which debuted in 1958 and continued until the model was dropped in 1964. Some 1.4 million Arondes were made in total, and this model alone is largely responsible for Simca becoming the second-biggest French automaker at the end of the 1950s.

== Simca 9 Aronde ==
Simca 9 Aronde
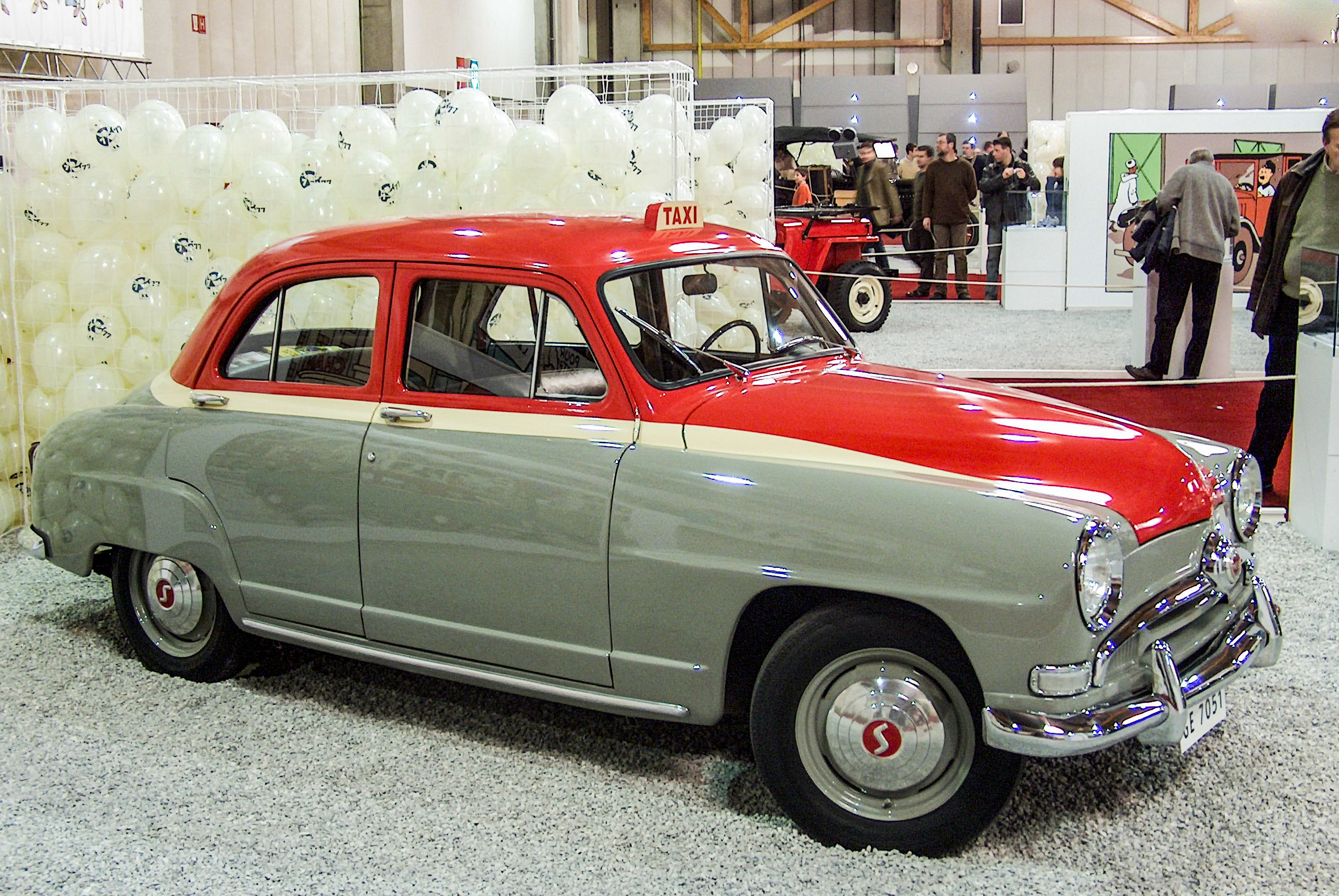
- Simca 9 Aronde 4-door saloon; similar to one found in the Tintin episode "The Calculus affair"

Overview
- Production: 1951–1955

Body and chassis
- Body style: 4-door saloon 2-door hardtop coupé 2-door coupé 2-door convertible 3-door estate 2-door pickup 2-door van

Powertrain
- Engine: 1221 cc OHV I4
- Transmission: four-speed manual

Dimensions
- Wheelbase: 2,440 mm (96.1 in)
- Length: 4,070 mm (160.2 in)
- Width: 1,560 mm (61.4 in)
- Height: 1,520 mm (59.8 in)

The first Aronde debuted in the spring of 1951 but initially only a few hundred pre-production cars were distributed to carefully selected "guinea-pig" buyers, and the full production version was finalised only in time for the Paris Motor Show, becoming available for sale in October 1951. The full production version incorporated various detail changes when compared to the pre-volume production cars, including a changed material for the seat covers and a moulded plastic dash-board which at the time appeared very modern when compared to the metal dashboard on the Aronde's most obvious competitor, the Peugeot 203. A few months later, at the start of 1952, space was found to position the battery under the bonnet/hood: in the earliest cars the battery was stowed under the front seat.

The Aronde was fitted with a front-mounted 1221 cc 44.5 bhp (33.2 kW) engine from the previous Simca model, the Simca 8, fuel feed being provided by a Solex 32 carburetor. Power was delivered to the rear wheels via a traditional four-speed manual gear box incorporating synchromesh on the top three ratios. The car had independent suspension at the front using coil springs, with a live axle at the rear, suspended using semi-elliptic leaf springs. Hydraulically operated 9.85 in (250 mm) drum brakes were used all round.

The only body style offered at the October 1951 launch was a four-door saloon/sedan/berline, but other configurations very soon became available such as the three-door estate (branded initially as the "Aronde commerciale" and later as the "Châtelaine") with a horizontally split tailgate. There was also a van, called the "Messagère", and a "commerciale semi-vitrée" - part panel van and part estate - became available in 1953. Of more interest to collectors is the two-door coupé coachbuilt by Facel. The Facel-built coupé was replaced for 1953 by a coupé based on the saloon Aronde body, called Grand Large, featuring a large three piece wrap-around rear window and a "pillarless" side window effect when both side windows were wound down.

A two-door cabriolet conversion, prepared by the coachbuilder Figoni, was presented to the public for the 1953 model year in a display involving ballerinas, but it proved impossible to confer sufficient structural rigidity on this car without unacceptable cost and weight penalties, and Figoni's Aronde cabriolet was never produced for sale.

The 1952 Motor Show saw several manufacturers attempting to broaden the appeal of mainstream ranges with stripped down versions offered at a reduced price. The trend seems to have been started by Renault with their 4CV Service, and they were quickly followed by other automakers in including Rosengart and Simca. Simca's "Aronde Quotidienne" was offered from January 1953 with an advertised price of 630,000 francs, which was a saving of 45,000 against the previous base model (confusingly branded, even then, as the "Aronde Berline Luxe"). The interior of the Quotidienne was simplified and the heater disappeared, as did most of the exterior trim. Nevertheless, chrome headlight surrounds remained in place: importantly, too, buyers of the "Aronde Quotidienne" could still choose from the full range of body colours offered on the "Aronde Berline Luxe". The company was keen to stress that the stripped down Aronde was not as fully stripped down as the Renault Frégate Affaires (available only in black), the Renault 4CV Service or the Rosengart Artisane (these last two being offered only in grey).

The 9 Aronde was well received, especially in France. It took only until 17 March 1953 before total production of this model at the Nanterre plant passed 100,000.

The company's flamboyant boss, Henri Pigozzi, was keenly aware of the publicity that could be generated from the craze for record breaking runs. In May 1952 an Aronde broke five international records by covering a distance of 50,000 km (31,000 mi) at an average speed of 117 km/h (73 mph), and in August 1953 another Aronde, selected at random from the production line, returned to the Montlhéry circuit for a new record attempt whereby during the course of forty days and forty nights the car covered 39,242 laps which represented 100,000 km (62,000 mi) at an average speed of more than 104 km/h (65 mph). This achievement, which involved breaking more than 30 international records, was undertaken under the supervision of the ACF.

A car tested in France by the British Motor magazine in 1951 had a top speed of 73.9 mph (118.9 km/h) and could accelerate from 0-60 mph (97 km/h) in 30.2 seconds. A fuel consumption of 34.1 miles per imperial gallon (8.3 L/100 km; 28.4 mpg_{‑US}) was recorded. The test car was reported to cost 970 Francs on the French market. It was not at the time available in the UK but the price was converted to £657.

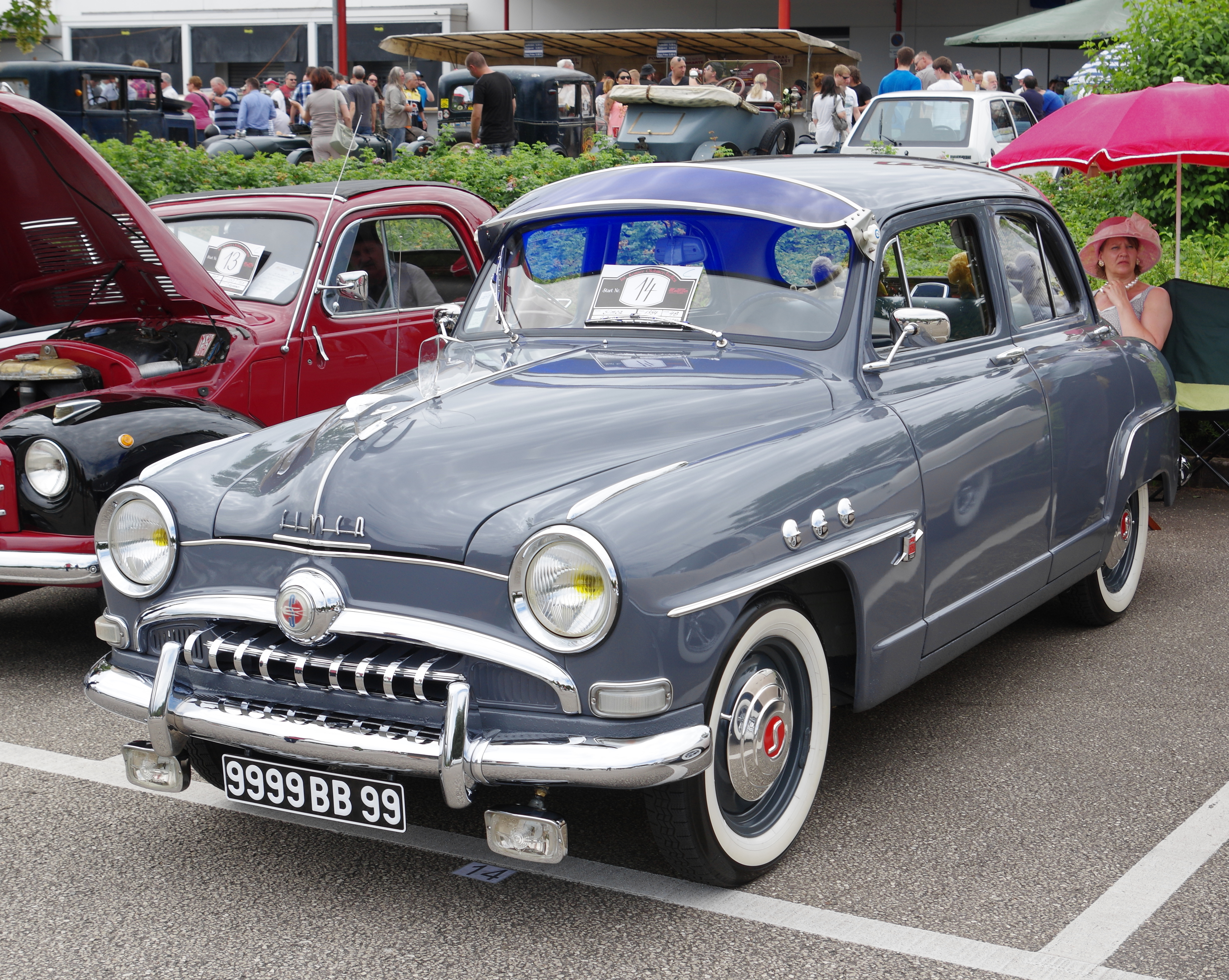
Simca 9 Aronde sedan

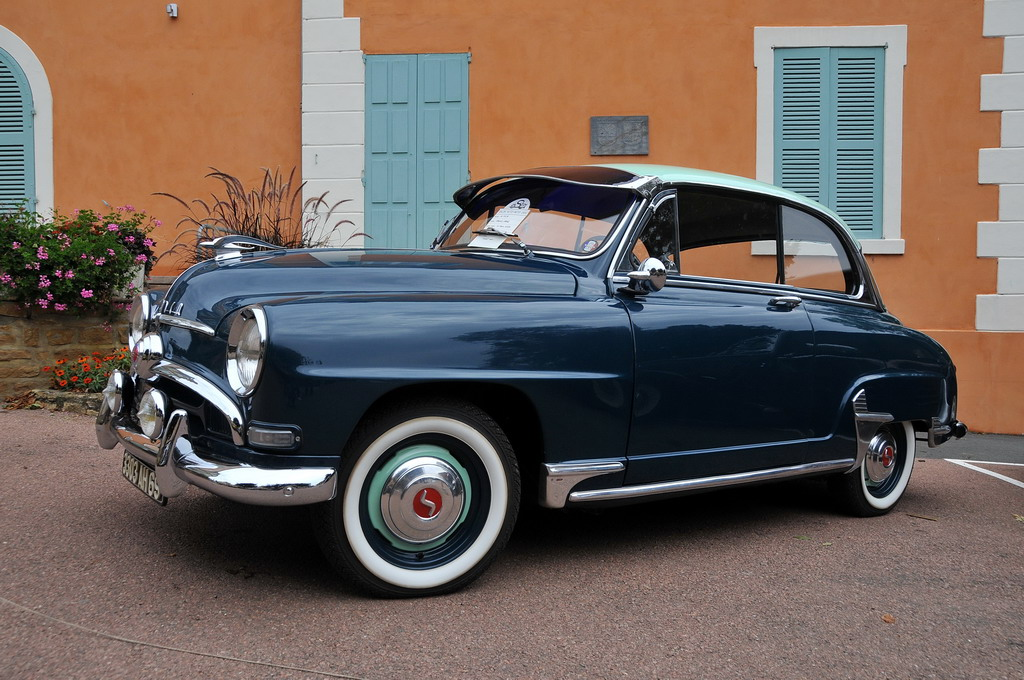
Simca 9 Aronde Grand Large

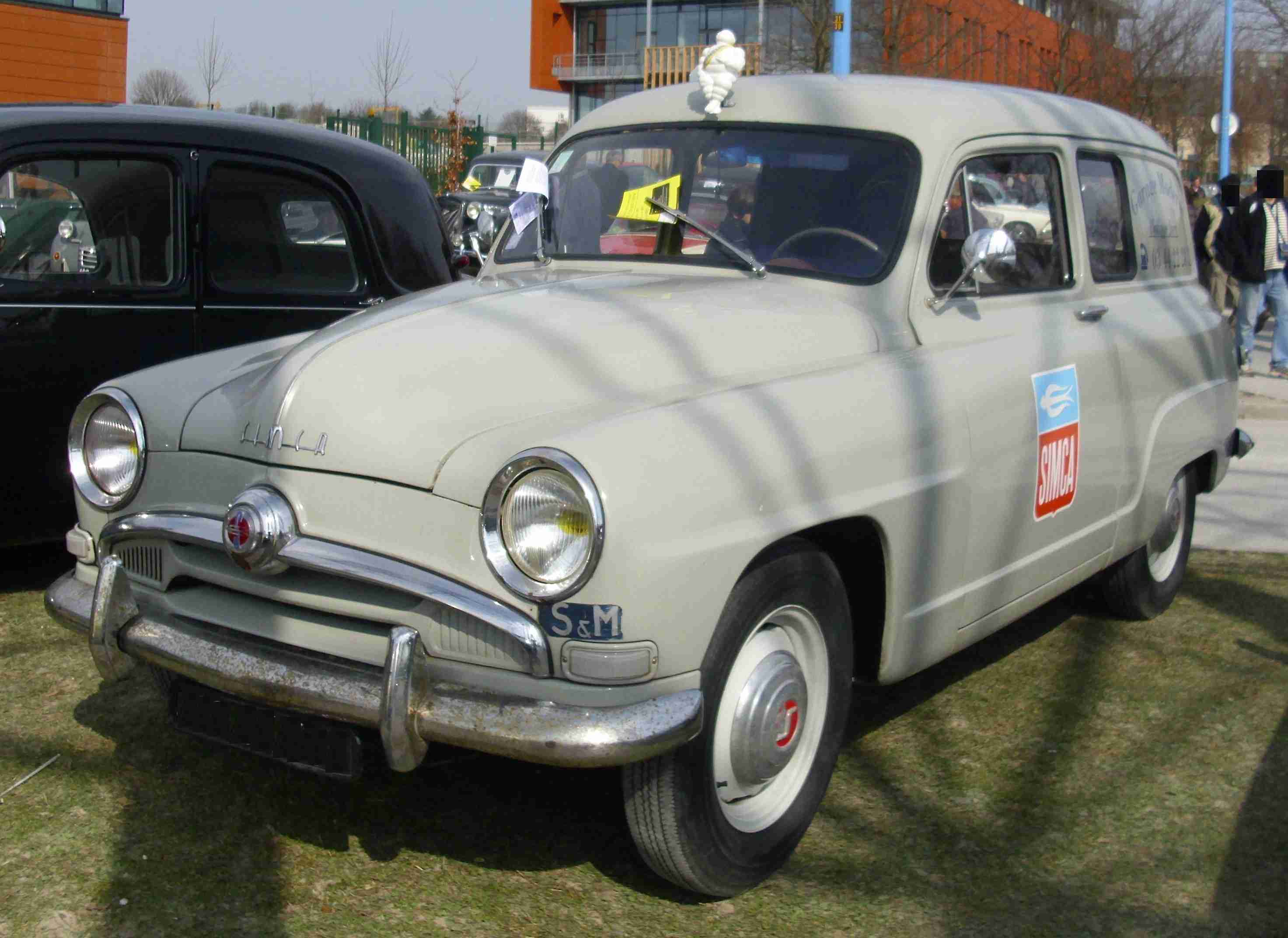
Simca 9 Aronde Messagère

== Simca 90A Aronde ==
Simca 90A Aronde
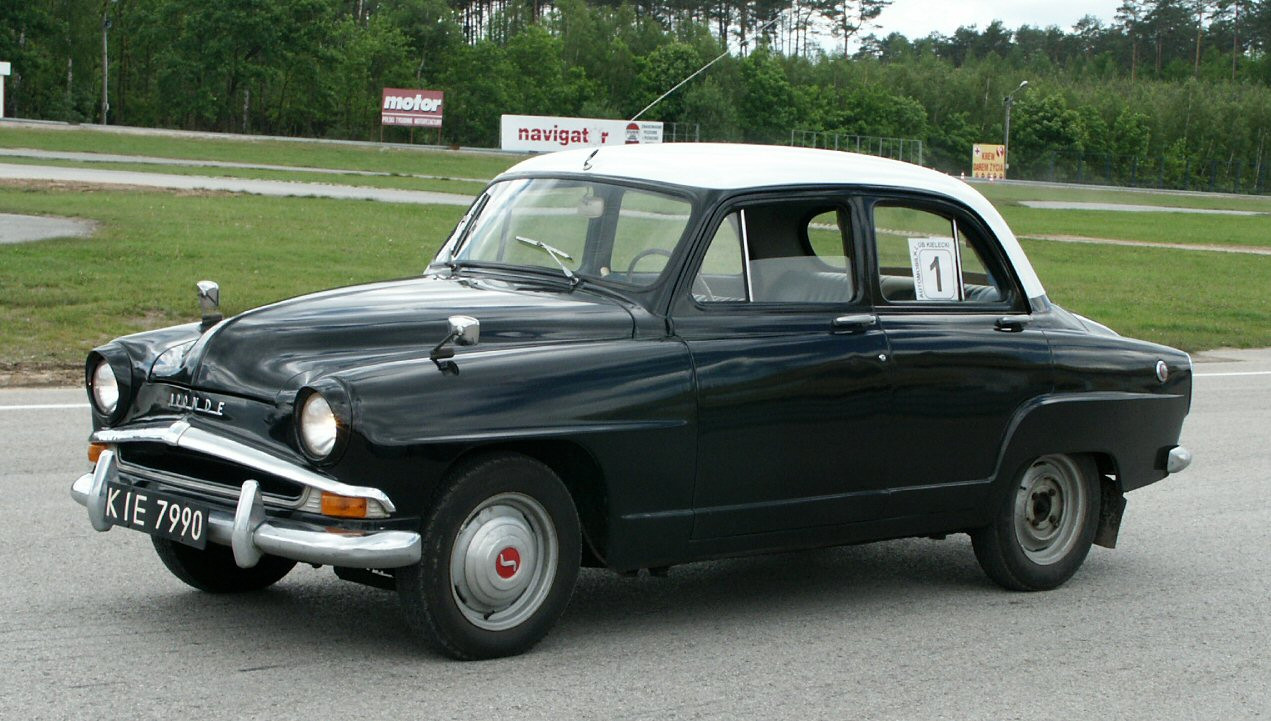
- Simca 90A Aronde 4-door saloon

Overview
- Production: 1955–1958

Body and chassis
- Body style: 4-door saloon 2-door hardtop coupé 2-door coupé 2-door convertible 3-door estate 2-door pickup 2-door van

Powertrain
- Engine: 1290 cc Flash OHV I4

Dimensions
- Wheelbase: 2,440 mm (96.1 in)
- Length: 4,115 mm (162.0 in)
- Width: 1,560 mm (61.4 in)
- Height: 1,510 mm (59.4 in)

The second-generation Aronde debuted in October 1955. The new Aronde was now powered by the ungraded and newly named 1290 cc Flash engine. The unit retained the 75 mm (3.0 in) cylinder stroke of the previous engine, but the cylinder bore was increased to 74 mm (2.9 in). The Solex 32 carburetter was unchanged but a raised compression ratio provided for a small increase in claimed maximum power which, for the models as displayed at the motor show in October 1955, now given as 45 hp (34 kW) at 4,500 rpm or 48 hp (36 kW) at 4,800 rpm (and more in some low volume more highly tuned versions).

Externally the Aronde for 1956 had an updated 9 Aronde body, with restyled front and rear ends. A very slight lengthening of the car at the back made it possible to position the spare wheel under the floor of the boot/trunk which allowed for a substantial increase in usable luggage capacity.

New trim levels, marketed as Elysée and Montlhéry (named after the Autodrome de Montlhéry) appeared. The "Commerciale" and "Messagère" vans remained available, with a 45 PS (33 kW) version of the 1.3 litre "Flash" engine. They received the 90K modelcode. An Aronde Chatelaine 3-door station wagon and an Aronde Intendante Pick-Up were also offered.

In January 1957, the 500,000th Aronde was made, and the cars were now exported even to the United States. In October 1957, two new versions joined the Aronde range: the Océane, a 2-seater cabriolet, and Plein Ciel, a 2-seater coupé, both with bodies by Facel.

An Aronde Elysee was tested by the British magazine The Motor in 1956 and was recorded as having a top speed of 82.6 mph (132.9 km/h) and could accelerate from 0-60 mph (97 km/h) in 23.9 seconds. A fuel consumption of 32.6 miles per imperial gallon (8.7 L/100 km; 27.1 mpg_{‑US}) was recorded. The test car cost £915 including taxes on the UK market. In 1960 they also tested one of the Montlhéry models. This had a slightly higher top speed of 83.6 mph (134.5 km/h), faster acceleration from 0-60 mph (97 km/h) in 19.6 seconds and a better fuel consumption of 35.0 miles per imperial gallon (8.1 L/100 km; 29.1 mpg_{‑US}). The test car cost £896 including taxes on the UK market.

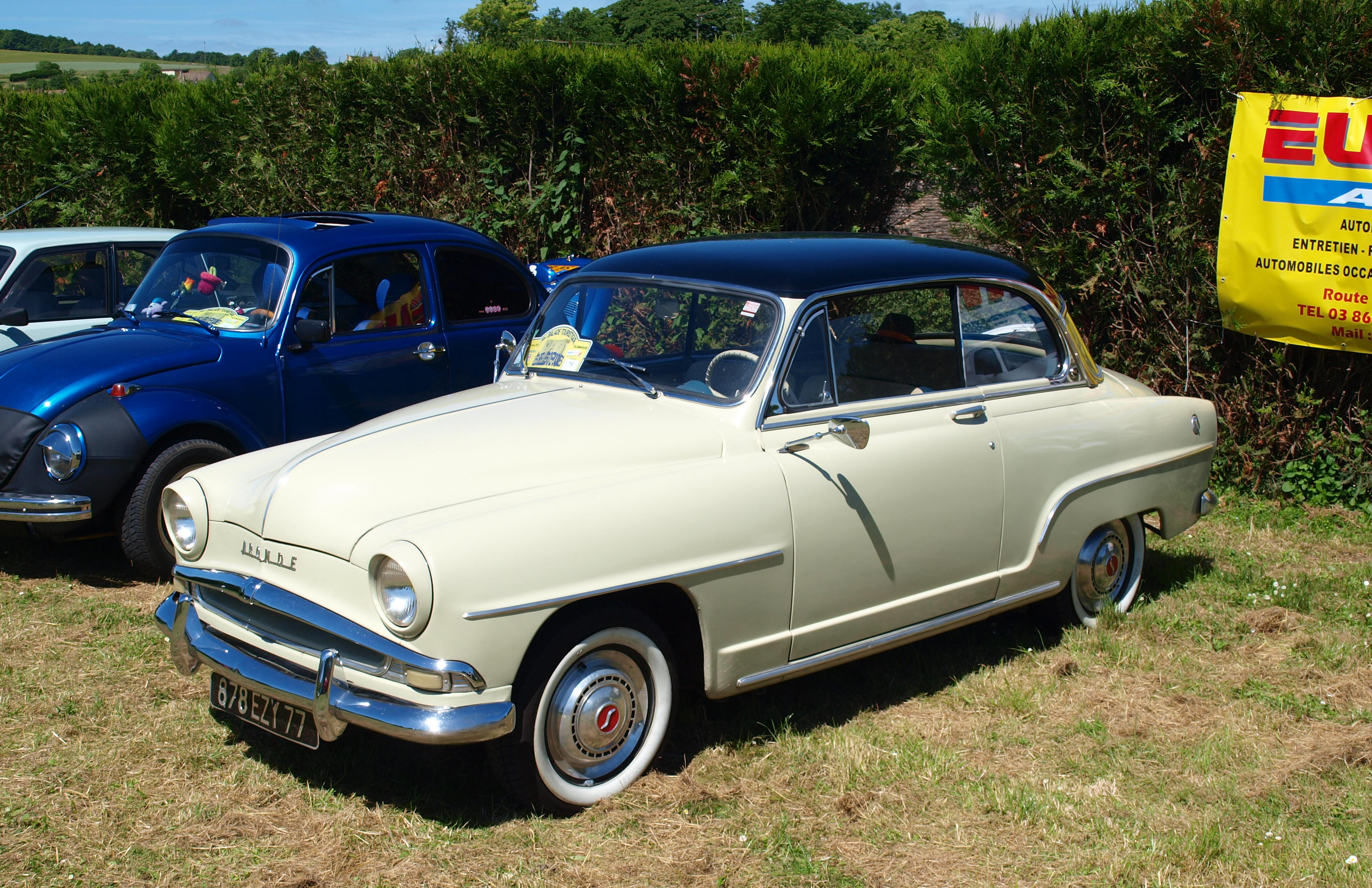
Simca 90A Aronde Grand Large

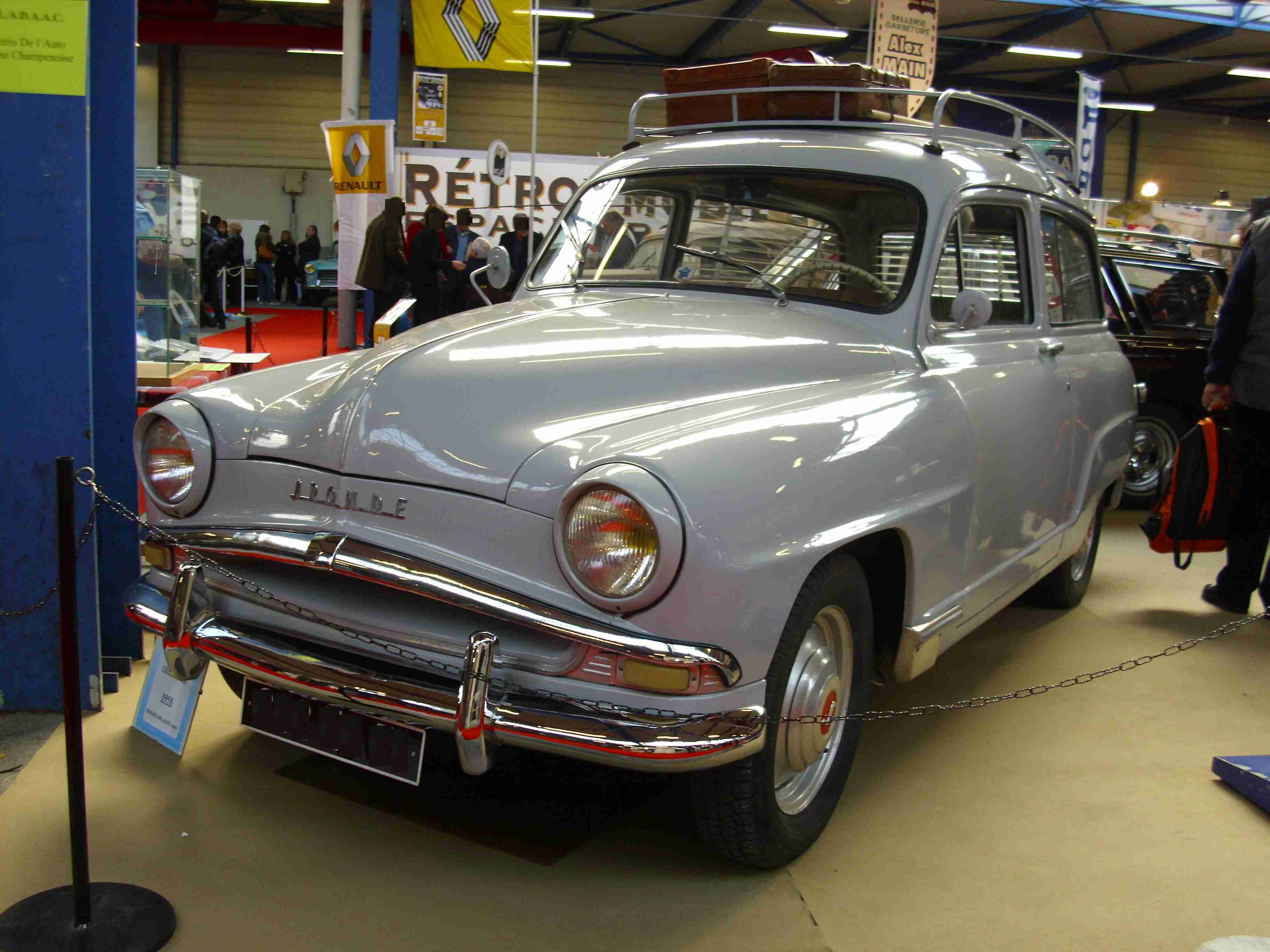
1958 Simca 90A Aronde Chatelaine

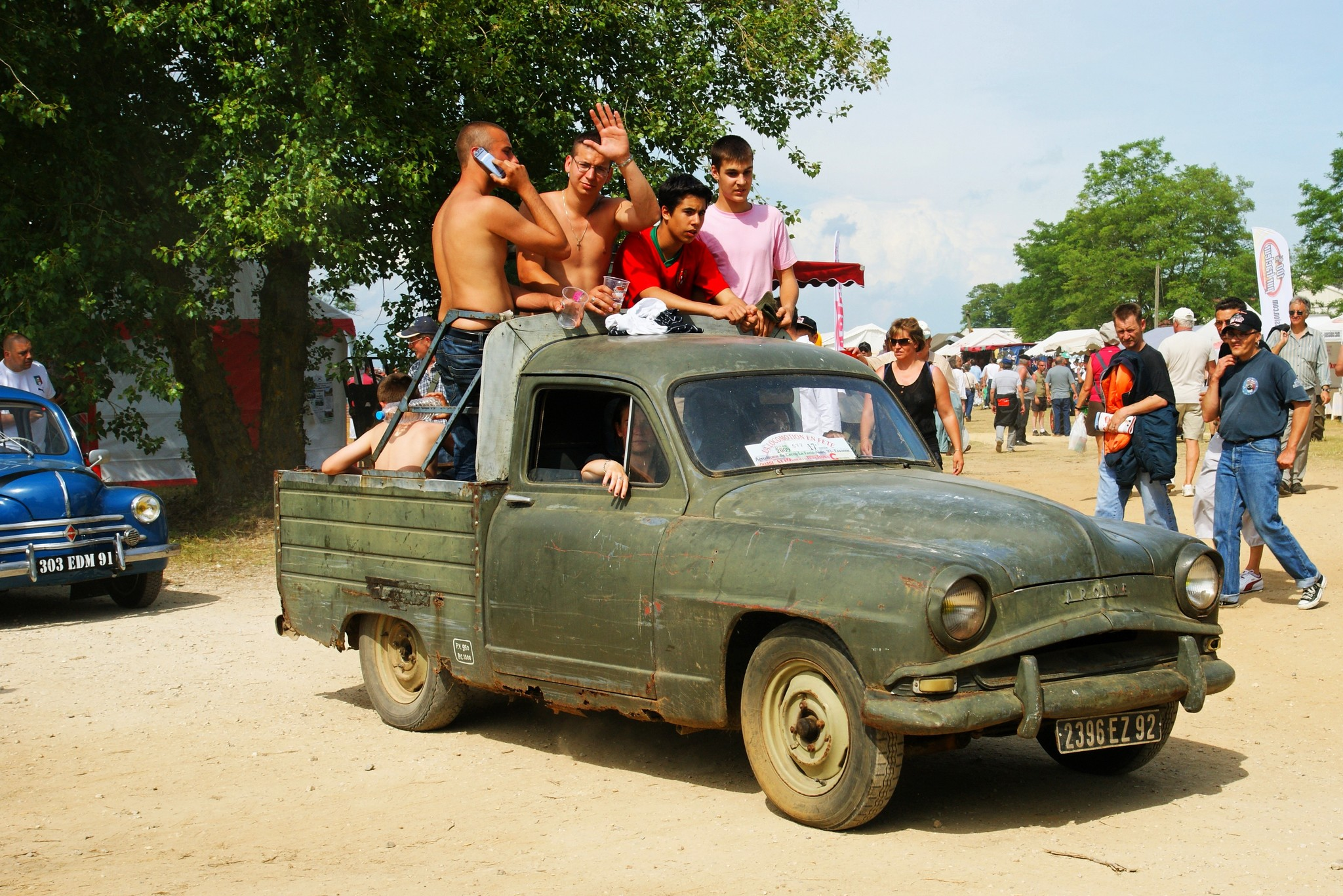
Simca 90A Aronde Intendante

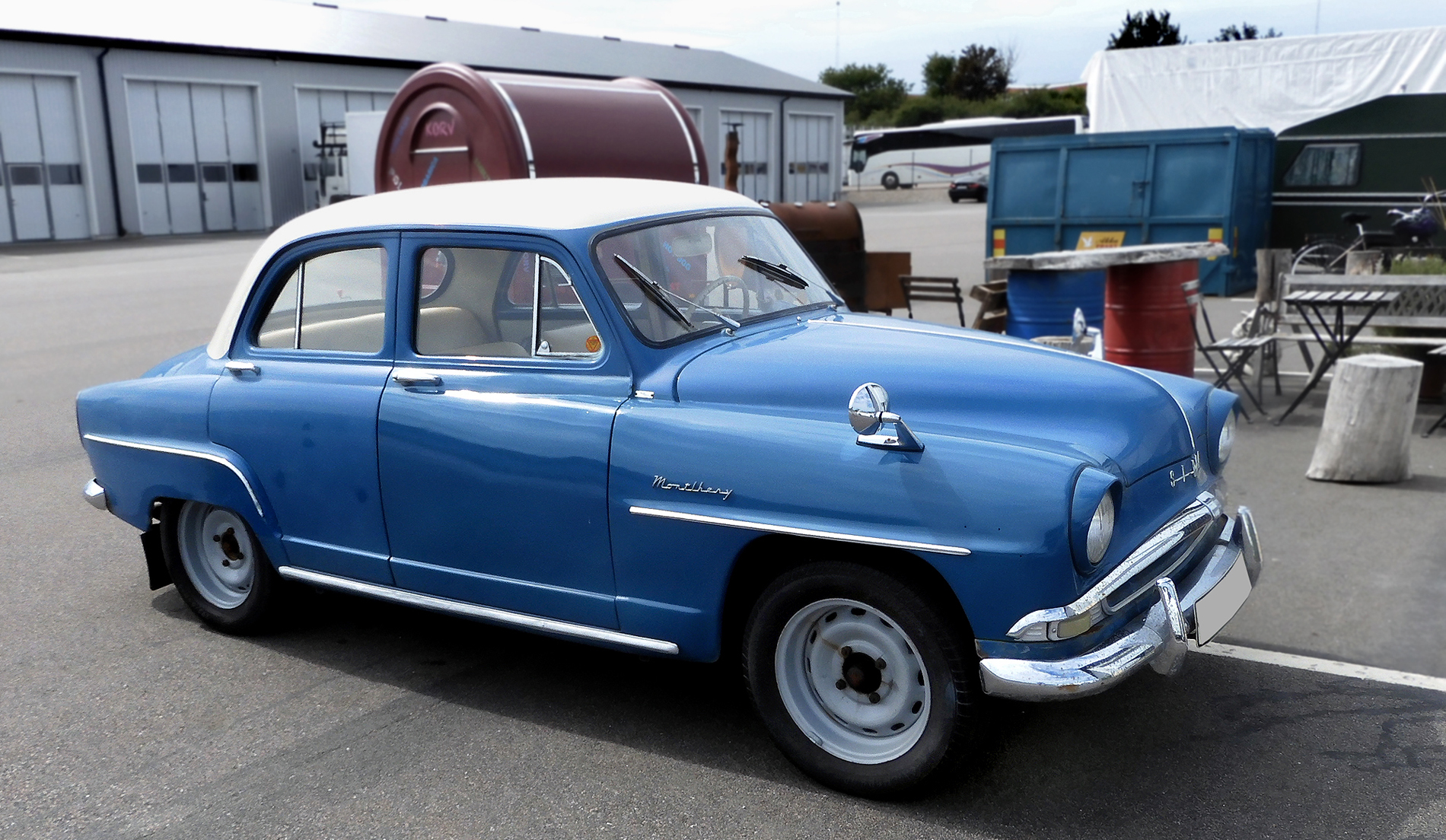
1957 Simca 90A Aronde Montlhéry

== Simca Aronde P60 ==
Simca Aronde P60
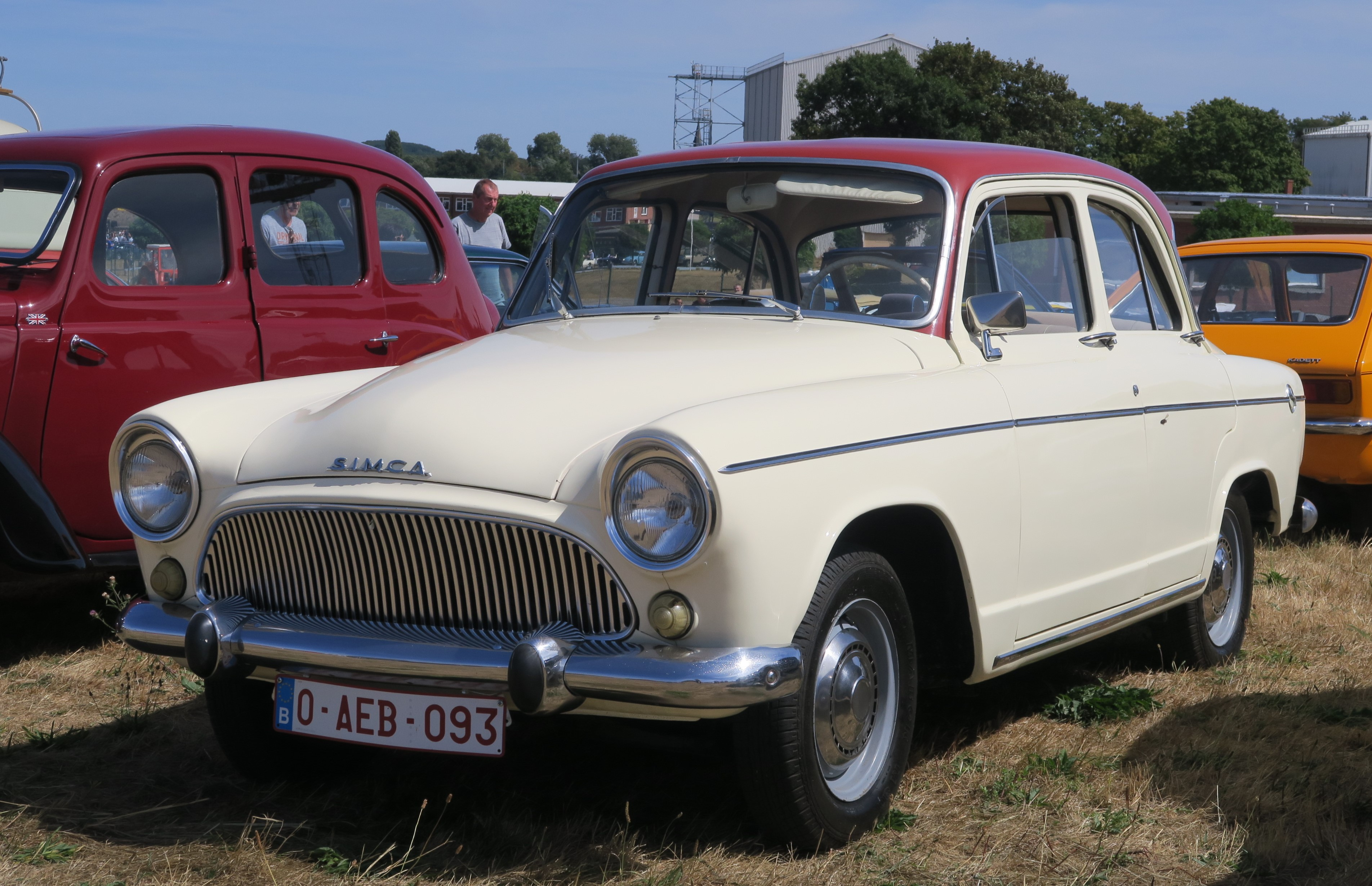
- Simca Aronde 4-door saloon (P60)

Overview
- Manufacturer: Simca
- Also called: Simca 5 (USA); Simca Etoile (Canada & USA)
- Production: 1958–1964

Body and chassis
- Body style: 4-door saloon 2-door hardtop coupé 2-door coupé 2-door convertible 3-door estate 2-door pickup 2-door van 5-door station wagon (Australia)

Powertrain
- Engine: 1090 cc (6CV) OHV I4; 1290 cc (7CV) Rush OHV I4
- Transmission: 4-speed manual

Dimensions
- Wheelbase: 2,440 mm (96.1 in)
- Length: 4,190 mm (165.0 in)
- Width: 1,570 mm (61.8 in)
- Height: 1,440 mm (56.7 in)

The P60 Aronde saloons, presented at the Paris Motor Show in October 1958, came with a new modern-looking body. The 2,440 mm (96.1 in) wheelbase was unchanged and, apart from a slightly lowered roof-line, the central portion of the body was still broadly similar to that of the original 1951 Aronde, but the discrete tail-fins and rear lights were restyled as were the headlights, set on either side of a larger grille at the front. Mechanically little had changed: more innovative was the wide range of versions and permutations now offered, with customers able to choose from a range of engines offering four different levels of power output (40, 45, 47 or 57 hp) and an options list that even included leather upholstery and a "Simcamatic" clutch.

=== A proliferation of names ===
In line with the manufacturer's determination to offer customers more choice, the Simca Aronde P60 was offered with various names. The following cars all shared the same wheelbase and the same length/width footprint:

- Simca Aronde P60 Élysée: 4-door berline (sedan/saloon) 1290 cc (7CV) 48.8 PS DIN (35.9 kW), 51.5 PS SAE (37.9 kW)
- Simca Aronde P60 Grand Large: "Coach panoramique" (2-door hardtop) 1290 cc (7CV) 48.8 PS DIN (35.9 kW), 51.5 PS SAE (37.9 kW)
- Simca Aronde P60 Montlhéry: 4-door berline (sedan/saloon) 1290 cc (7CV, higher compression) 56.2 PS DIN (41 kW), 60 PS SAE (44 kW)
- Simca Aronde P60 Monaco: "Coach panoramique" (2-door hardtop) 1290 cc (7CV, higher compression) 56.2 PS DIN (41 kW), 60 PS SAE (44 kW)
- Simca Aronde P60 Artisanale/Châtelaine: 3-door estate 1290 cc (7CV) 45 PS SAE (33 kW)

Although the engines were unchanged, direct comparisons between the Aronde P60 Élysée and the previous model disclosed a small deterioration in overall top-end performance which was attributed to various "improvements" to the car's overall profile which, taken together, reduced the body's aerodynamic efficiency. The Aronde Artisanale and Châtelaine (estate; the names reflected lower and higher levels of equipment, respectively) at this stage retained the body of the earlier Aronde 90A Châtelaine. Sometime in 1960 a more luxurious estate version, branded as the Simca Aronde P60 Ranch, combined the new front end (resembling, according to one source, the 1957 Ford Thunderbird) from the new Aronde P60 with the back end of the previous generation of Aronde estates.

=== Broadening the range ===
The announcement of the Aronde P60 coincided with a resurrection for the old 1090 cc (6CV) engine last seen in the Simca 8 before that model received a larger engine in 1949. The old 6CV unit was now fitted in a reduced specification Simca Aronde, but the bodies of these downmarket Arondes still, at this stage, were those of the 90A Aronde of 1955-58, and not from the new Aronde P60. The cylinder stroke of the two engines was the same, but the bore diameter on the 1090cc unit was smaller and in return for a rather anaemic level of performance, buyers enjoyed a small improvement in fuel consumption. The car, known as the Aronde Deluxe Six, was aggressively priced at 598,000 Francs which enabled it to compete with the popular Renault Dauphine for which listed prices started at 594,500 Francs.

The "old" Aronde body was also available with the 1290 cc (7CV) unit fitted in the new Aronde P60s, and in this form the car was known as the Aronde Super Deluxe.

A year later the entry-level Arondes acquired the P60 body that the other models had received in 1958, and the 1960 cars exhibited at the Paris Motor Show in October 1959 combined the newer bodies with the engines and the reduced specifications of the previous year's entry-level models. The price had crept up too, with the entry level Aronde Deluxe Six now listed at 6,050 New Francs for a basic saloon, while the basic Renault Dauphine was still listed at less than 6,000 New Francs. The changes for the 1960 model year also involved more names, and the three low-end Aronde models were now named as follows:

- Simca Aronde P60 Deluxe six: 4-door berline (sedan/saloon) 1090 cc (6CV) 40 PS SAE (29 kW)
- Simca Aronde P60 Étoile six: 4-door berline (sedan/saloon) 1090 cc (6CV) 40 PS SAE (29 kW) (featuring more sophisticated rear suspension)
- Simca Aronde P60 Étoile sept: 4-door berline (sedan/saloon) 1290 cc (7CV) 48.8 PS DIN (35.9 kW), 51.5 PS SAE (37.9 kW)

After this the old Aronde body was restricted to a single model, the Simca Deluxe sept also known as the "Aronde Outremer" since it was intended for sale overseas, chiefly in Algeria, at that time blighted by an increasingly bitter war for independence.

=== Engines ===
A new engine, the Rush 1290 cc unit, with the same cylinder dimensions as before, but now incorporating a five-bearing crankshaft, was fitted to the Arondes beginning from October 1960. A wide range of power outputs for the new engine was offered according to model, ranging initially from 48 PS (35 kW) to 57 PS (42 kW). During this period higher octane fuels were becoming the norm at filling stations across France, and some of the changed power outputs correlated with changed compression ratios. The situation is further complicated by the introduction of changes to the basis for computing power output in France (and elsewhere in Europe) at the end of the 1950s.

A 70 PS (51 kW) version of the engine, called Rush Super M, debuted in September 1961 in two models - the Montlhéry Spéciale saloon and Monaco Spéciale hardtop coupé.

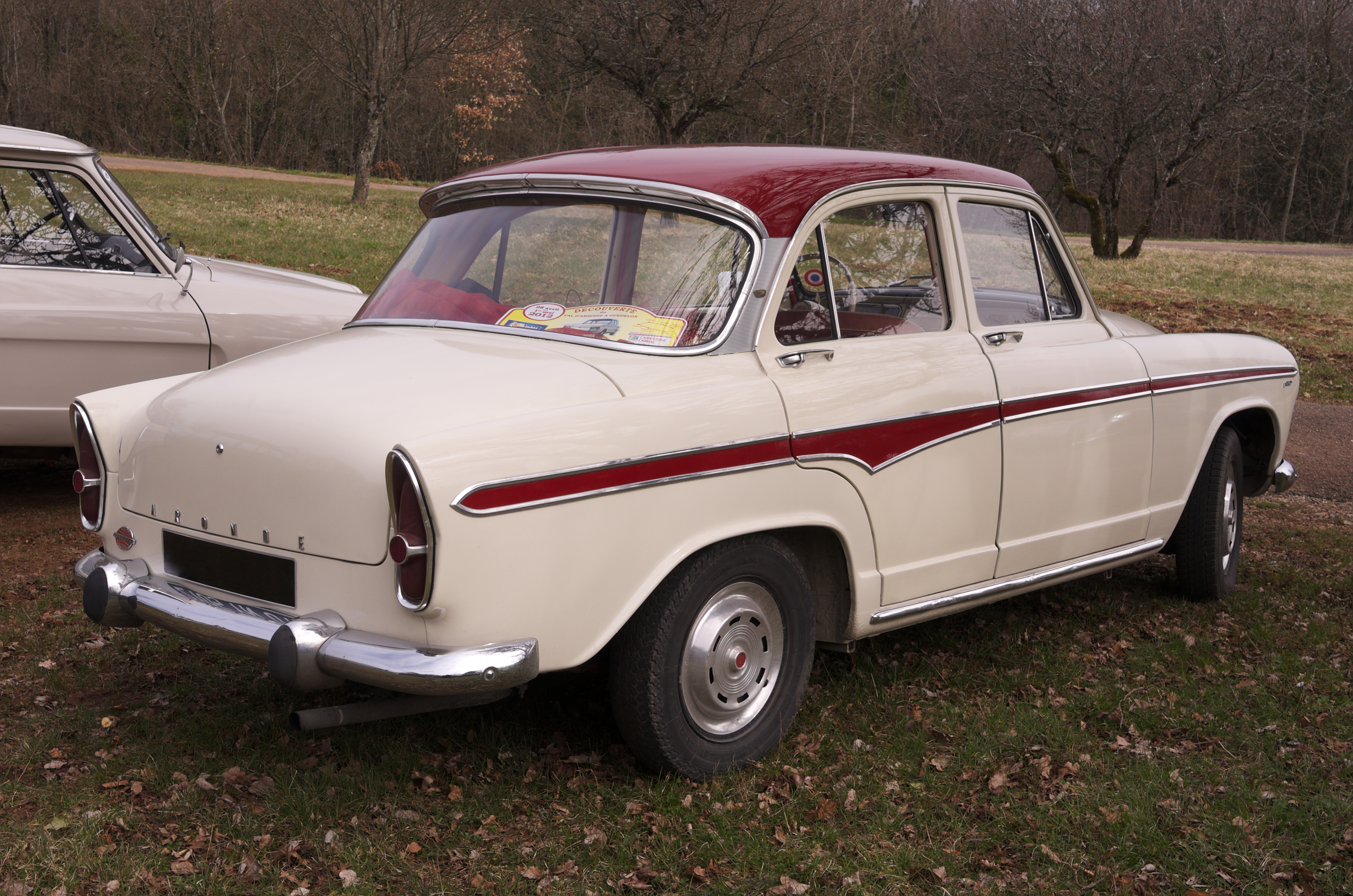
Simca Aronde 4-door saloon (P60)

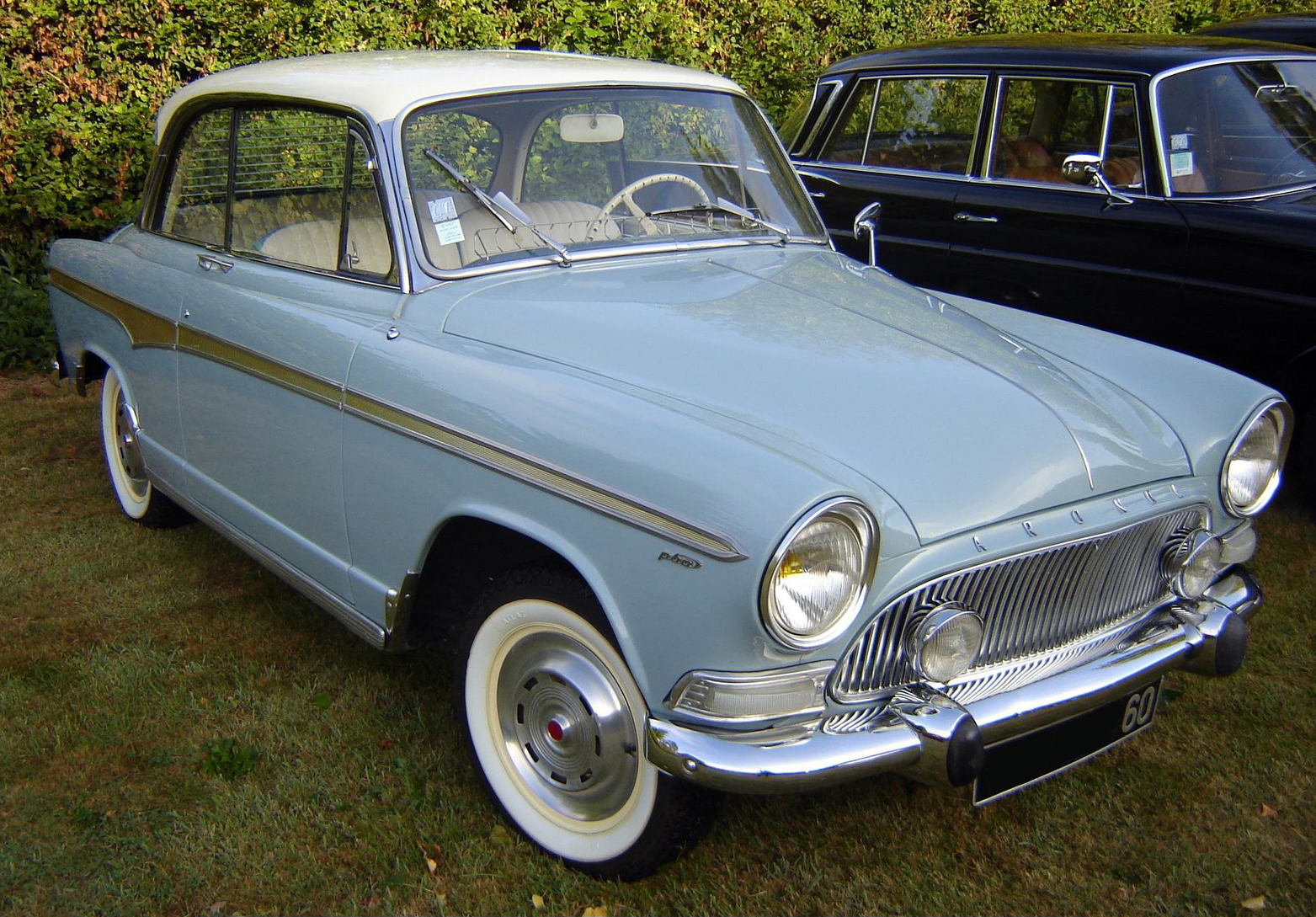
Simca Aronde Monaco 2-door pillarless saloon (P60), promoted in some markets as a hardtop coupé

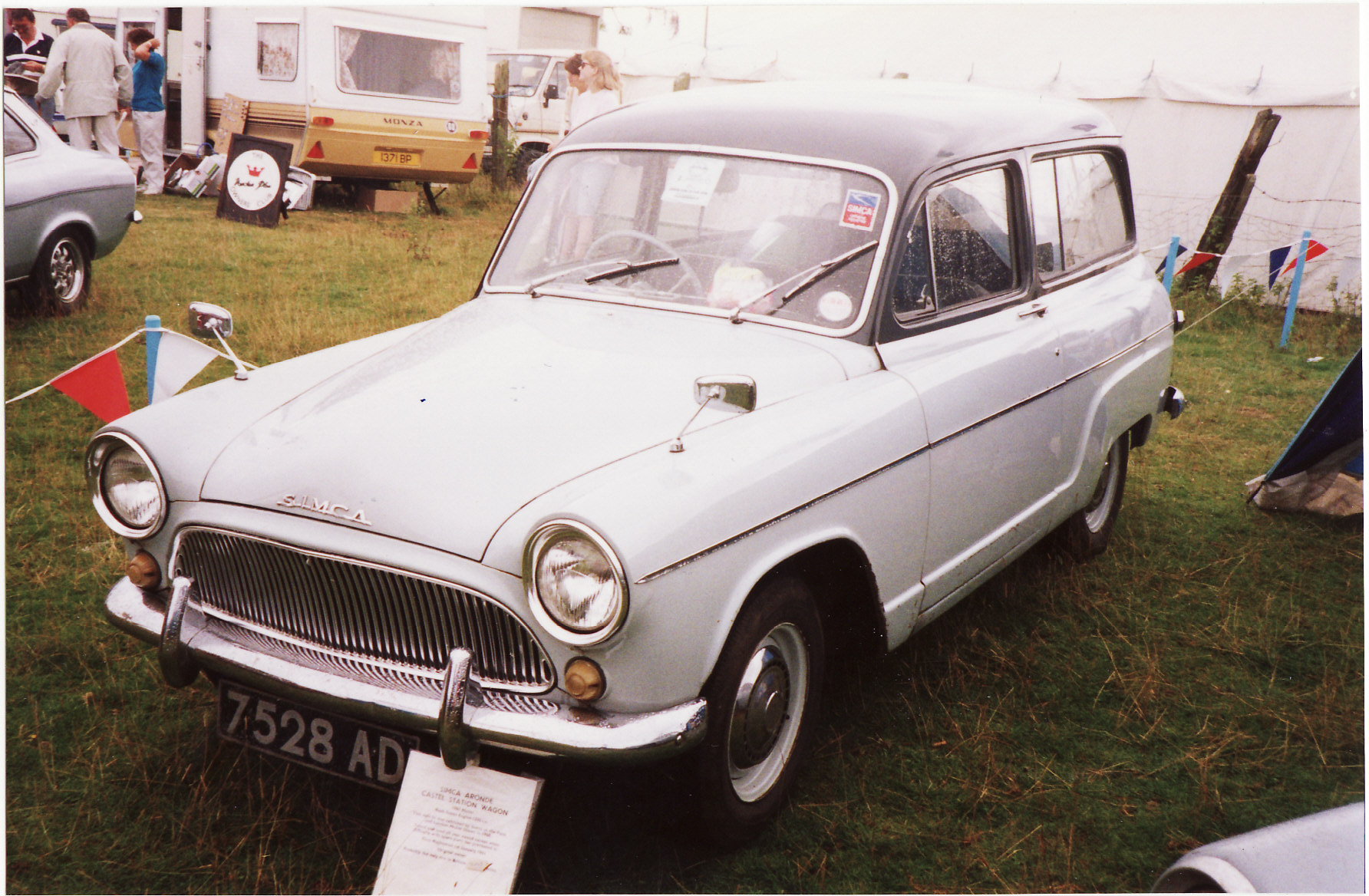
Simca Aronde Castel 3-door wagon (P60)

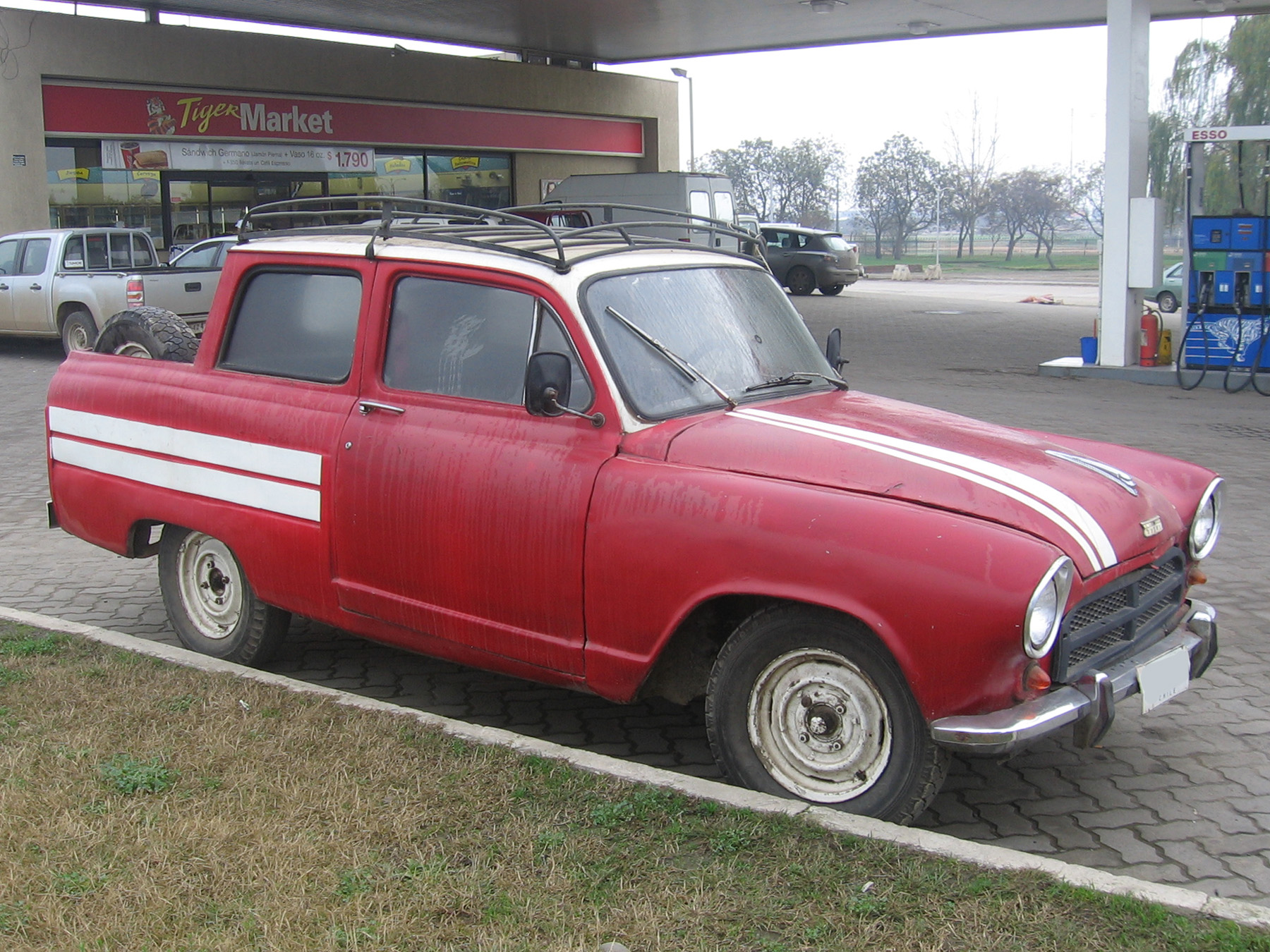
Simca Aronde P60 Intendante 1300 Cab

== Australian production ==
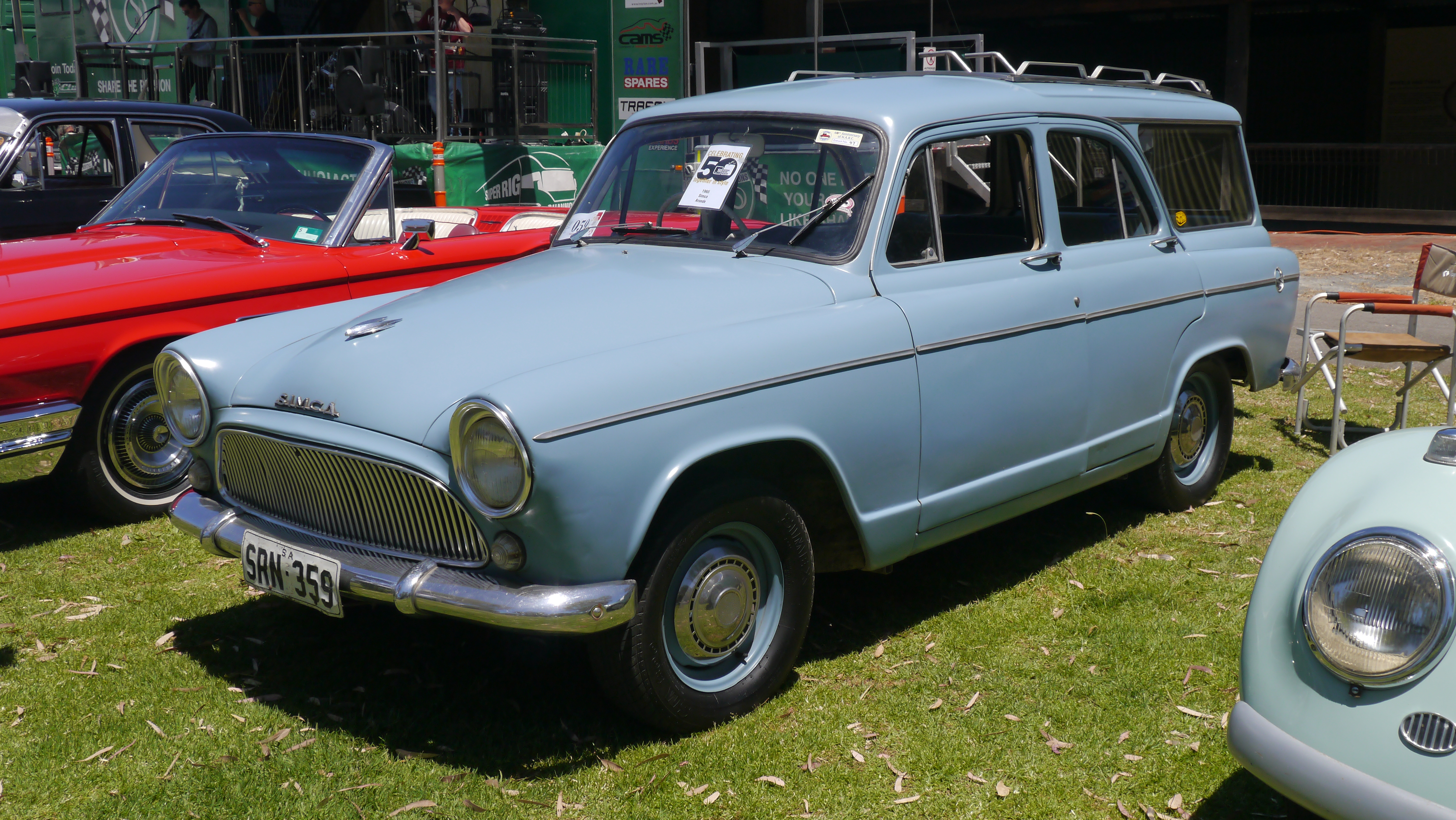
The 5-door Simca Aronde Station Wagon (P60) was developed by Chrysler Australia

The 90A Aronde was produced in Australia from 1956 by Northern Star Engineering which, along with Continental and General Distributors, had been contracted to assemble the model from CKD kits, using local content. In July 1959, Chrysler Australia announced that future production of the Aronde would be undertaken at its factories in Adelaide. In 1960 the P60 was introduced, selling alongside the 90A well into 1960, and a five-door P60 station wagon was introduced in late 1961. The wagon, which was unique to Australia, was based on the four-door sedan and featured an extended roof-line and a tail-gate fitted with a wind-down window. At the beginning of 1964 the sedan was retailing for £999 including taxes, while the station wagon was £1,109 including taxes. Australian production of the Aronde ceased the same year.

== Simca Sport ==
Simca Sport
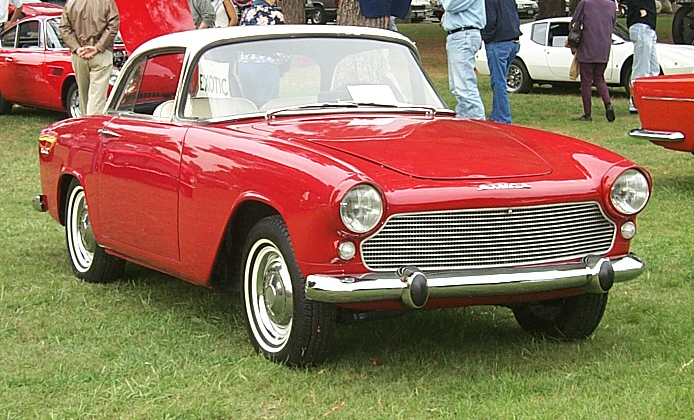
- Simca Sport Plein Ciel

Overview
- Manufacturer: Simca
- Production: 1950–1962
- Assembly: France: Nanterre

Body and chassis
- Body style: 2-seater sports coupé 2-seater sports cabriolet

Powertrain
- Engine: Until 1955: 1221 cc (7CV) OHV I4 50 hp (37 kW); From 1956: 1290 cc (7CV) OHV I4 57 hp (43 kW) later increased to 60 hp (45 kW), then 70 hp (52 kW)
- Transmission: 4-speed manual

Dimensions
- Wheelbase: 2,440 mm (96.1 in)

The Simca Sport was a two seater sports car. It originated as a coupé version of the Simca 8, but with the arrival of the Aronde the Simca Sport acquired a new grille in October 1951, and six months later it gained an extra 20 mm (0.8 in) of wheelbase, from 1952 sharing its 2,440 mm (96.1 in) wheelbase with the Aronde as well as its (at this stage) 1221 cc (7CV) engine. The Simca Sport would continue to share its engine and other technical components, as well as its wheelbase, with the Aronde until its withdrawal in 1962.

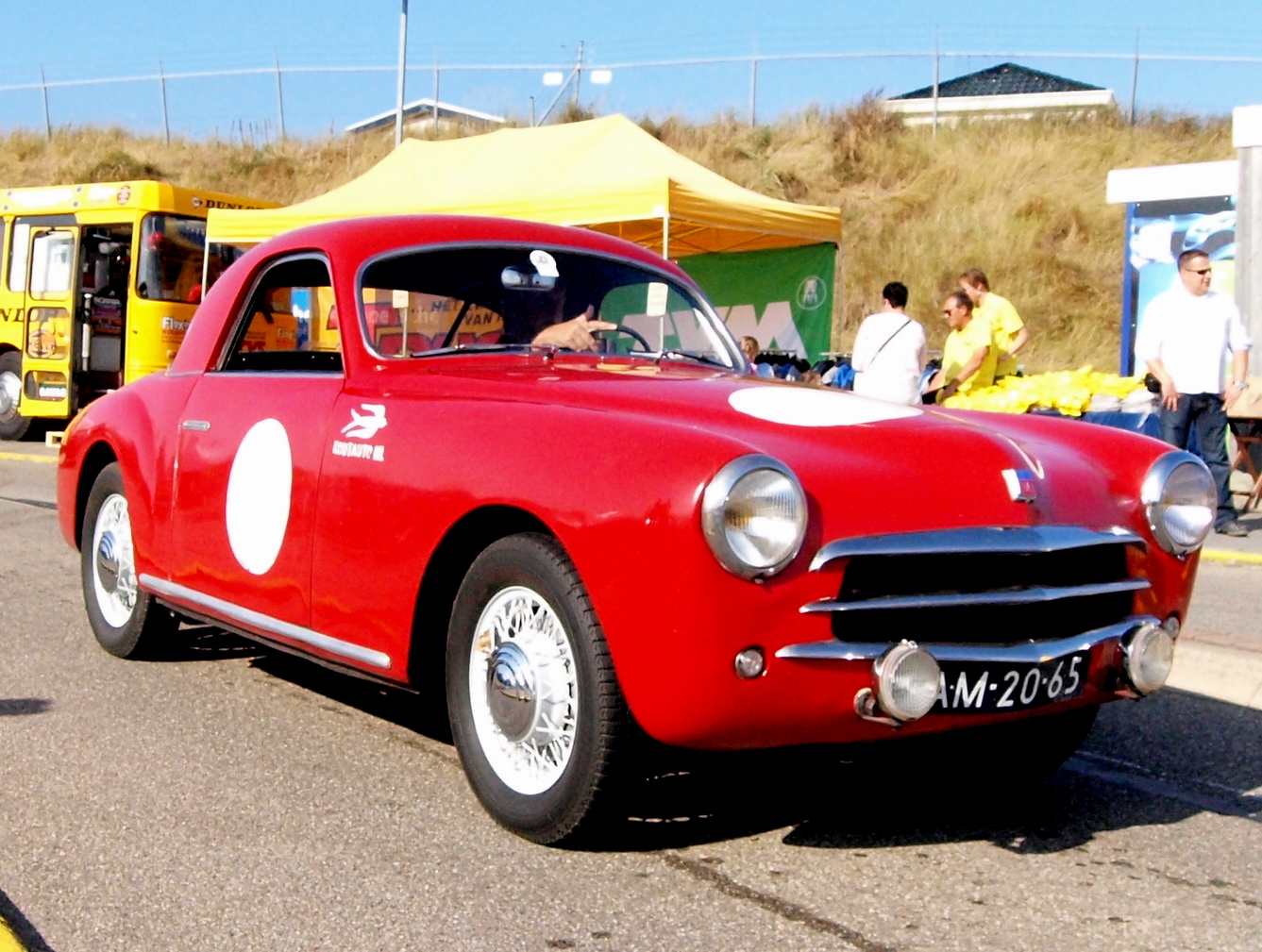
1952 Simca 9 Sport coupé

It became increasingly expensive and correspondingly rare. Although its origins predated those of the Simca Aronde, the Simca Sport is now usually presented as a low volume stylishly rebodied version of the Aronde.

The arrival of the 2,440 mm (96.1 in) wheelbase in 1952 coincided with the loss of a separate chassis, and from now on the Sport used an elegant monocoque body. The new monocoque bodied car was offered only as a two-seater hardtop coupé, there being for the time being no replacement for the former Simca Sport cabriolet as the monocoque body did not offer the same levels of rigidity. The three-window 9 Sport, using very similar bodywork to the earlier 8 Sport model, arrived in April 1952 but only lasted for less than a year, with the 1953 9 Sport receiving new five-window bodywork from Facel. Somewhat heavy and expensive, Simca made the fully equipped version into the standard version and renamed it the Coupé de Ville in the fall of 1954.

In October 1952 a cabriolet version of the now chassisless Simca Sport was exhibited, but the cabriolet version only entered production more than two years later in the Spring of 1955, presumably reflecting the challenges involved achieving sufficient structural rigidity in a slim and shapely cabriolet body, without incurring an excessive weight penalty.

=== Simca Sport: More names and other changes for 1957 ===
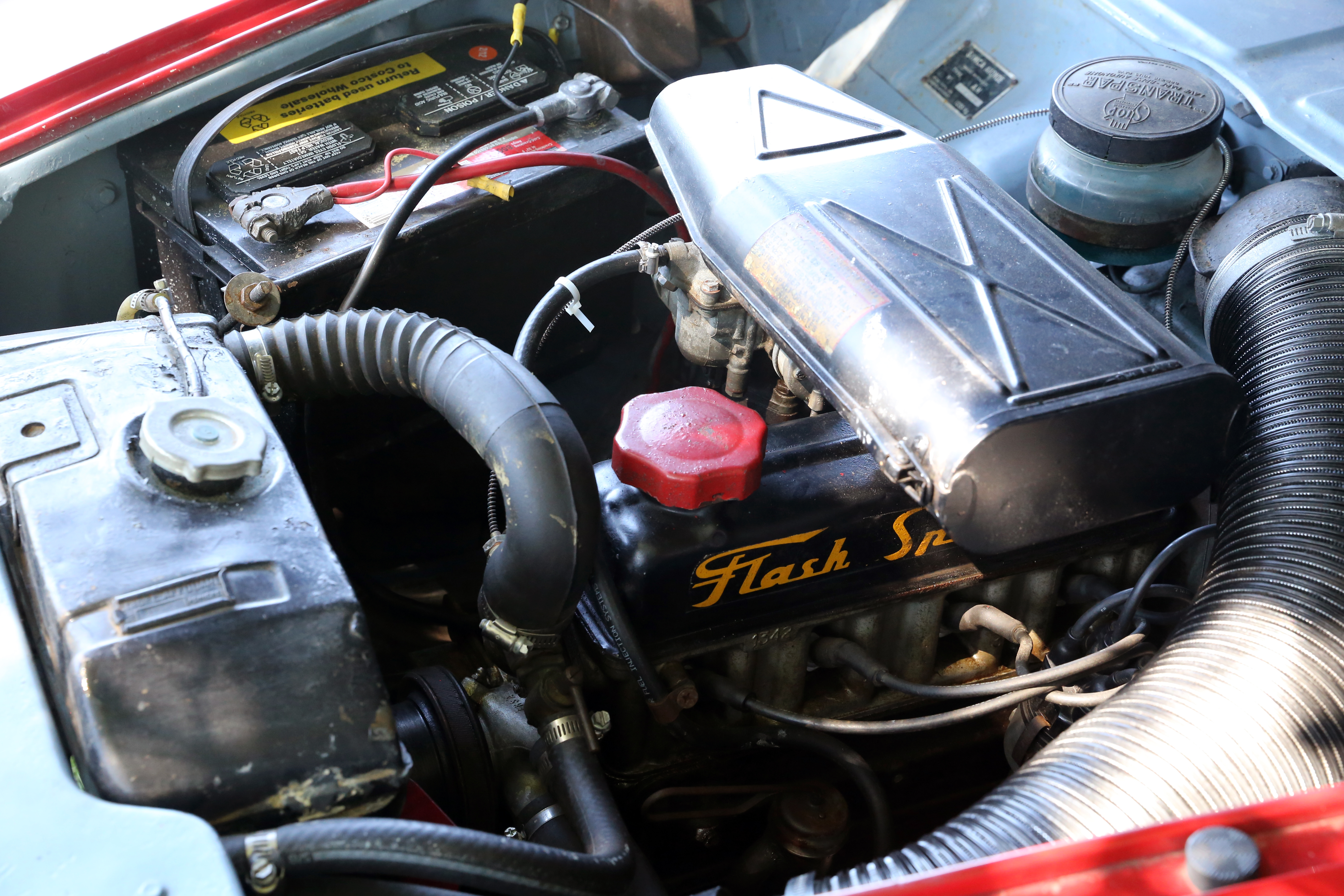
The "Flash Spécial" engine in a 1959 Aronde Océane, with 57 hp

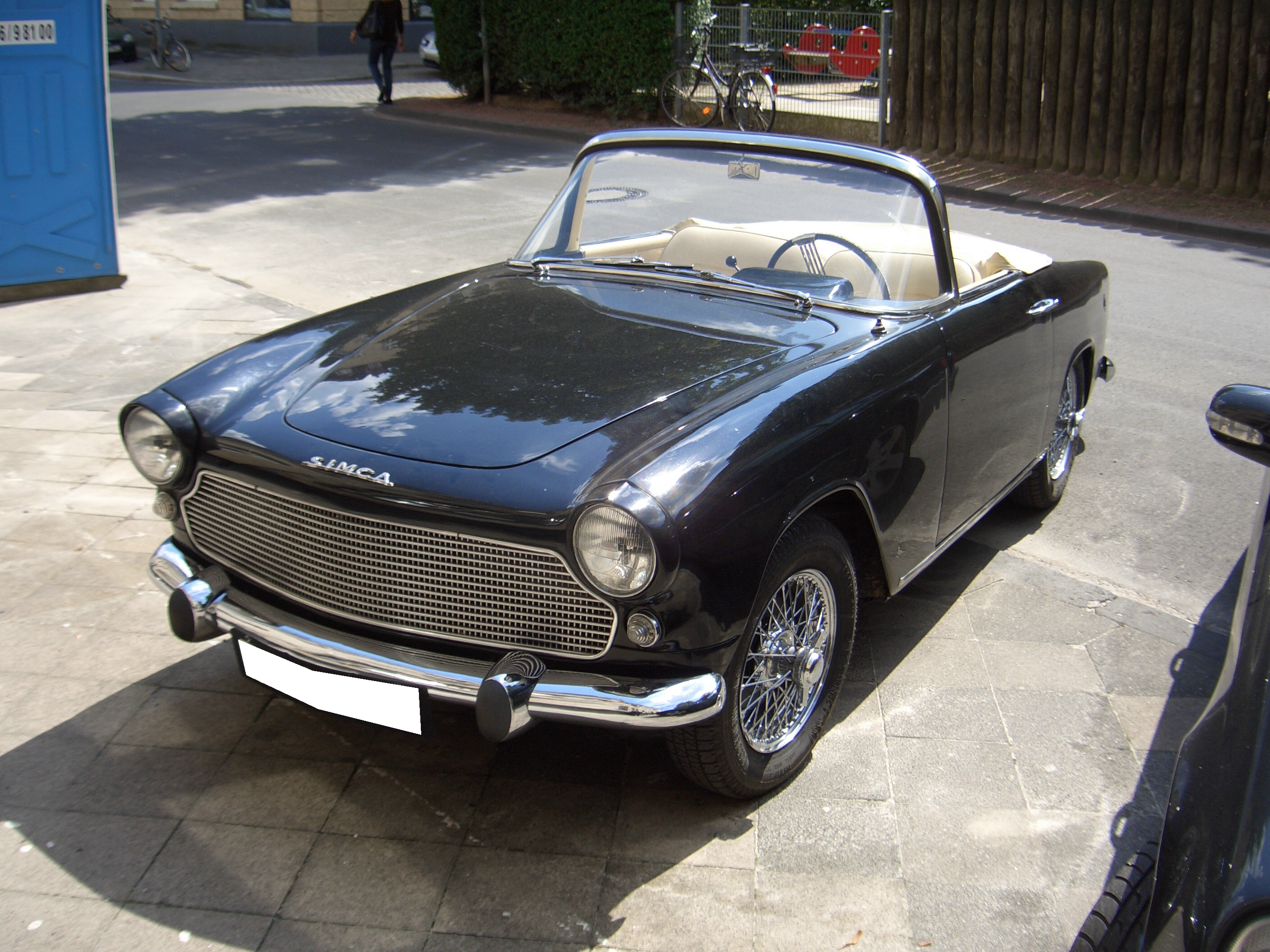
This open topped version was badged as the Simca Sport Océane.

A new generation of the Simca Sport was launched at the 1956 Paris Motor Show. There was, as before, a choice between a two seater sports cabriolet and a two seater sports hardtop. The bodies came from Facel. The cost of organising and producing a coachbuilt body was reflected in the price of the Sport, which at the 1957 Motor show was listed as 1,079,000 francs for the fixed roof "Plein Ciel" version: this compared with a starting price of 595,000 Francs for the Simca Aronde with which the Sport shared its engine and other mechanical elements. Mechanically and visually the new cars were not so different from those they replaced, but they were readily differentiated by their fashionable wrap-around "panoramic" windscreens. In 1956 the 1290 cc Flash Spécial engine with 57 CV (42 kW) was introduced; this was upgraded to 60 CV (44 kW) during 1960. This was further upgraded in 1961 with the 62 CV (46 kW) Rush Super engine with five main bearings, when the lower-priced "S" model was also added.

In 1957 the two versions of the Simca Sport received extra names, which was in keeping with the manufacturer's marketing strategy at the time. The Cabriolet version, from which on a sunny day the driver could enjoy an unimpeded view of the sky, was now branded as the Simca Sport Océane while, bizarrely, the fixed roof version was branded as the Simca Sport Plein Ciel (Simca Sport Open Sky). Although precluded by their prices from becoming big sellers, the eye catching sports models served the company well, adding glamour to Simca show rooms and exhibition stands.

=== The final years of the Simca Sport ===
When the Aronde received a reworked body in 1958 there was no corresponding update for the Simca Sport which changed very little after 1957. Under the bonnet/hood, however, the Sport benefited from the upgraded version of the 1290 cc "Rush" engine, shared with the newly announced Simca Aronde P60 Montlhéry Spéciale introduced for both models at the Motor show in October 1961. The uprated "Rush Super M" engine featured a further increase in compression ratio, now set at 8.5:1, and an increase in power to 70 hp (52 kW) at 5400 rpm. The result was a small gain in performance and a useful improvement in flexibility.

At the end of the 1950s prototype replacements for the Simca Sport were developed and four cars were built, but the project did not progress to production. In 1961 the Sport was still priced at nearly twice the level of the entry level Aronde, and in 1962 production of the car ended without replacement. Total production of Facel-bodied Simca sports was 20,196, according to Facel's records.
