= Olympique Lyonnais–AS Saint-Étienne rivalry =

Football rivalry

Olympique Lyonnais–Saint-Étienne rivalry
- Other names: Le Derby
- Location: Rhône-Alpes, France
- Teams: Lyon; Saint-Étienne
- First meeting: 28 October 1951; Division 1 Lyon 4–2 Saint-Étienne
- Latest meeting: 20 April 2025; Ligue 1 Saint-Étienne 2–1 Lyon

Statistics
- Total meetings: 126
- Most wins: Lyon (47)
- Most player appearances: Serge Chiesa (28)
- Top scorer: Hervé Revelli; Fleury Di Nallo (14 each)
- Largest victory: Lyon 1–7 Saint-Étienne; French Division 1 (5 October 1969)

The Olympique Lyonnais–AS Saint-Étienne rivalry, is a football rivalry between French clubs Olympique Lyonnais and AS Saint-Étienne, with matches between them referred to as the Derby rhônalpin or simply Le Derby. Both clubs are located in the region of Auvergne-Rhône-Alpes. The term Derby du Rhône is sometimes mistakenly used by French media, despite the city of Saint-Étienne not being located along the Rhône River nor in the Rhône département.

== Background ==
The two clubs first met in 1951 and, due to the clubs' close proximity, being separated by only 50 kilometres (31 mi), a hotly contested rivalry developed. The derby is cited as one of the high-points of the Ligue 1 season and, like other major rivalries, extends outside of the pitch. The rivalry is considered a symbolic challenge between the two cities locally, as the city of Lyon is considered white collar while its counterpart Saint-Étienne is viewed by the locals as more blue collar.

During the 20th century, Saint-Étienne was the most successful club in French football winning ten league titles between 1957 and 1981, a record that stood until Paris Saint-Germain overtook them in 2023. During that span, the club also won six Coupe de France titles and performed well at the European level. However, the club's performance declined in the 1980s and it even suffered relegations to the second division in both 1984 and 2022, causing its stranglehold on the national and regional consciousness to weaken. Lyon began a similar ascension into French football at the beginning of the new millennium when the club won their first-ever Ligue 1 championship in 2002. The initial title started a national record-setting streak of seven successive titles.

Currently, both clubs are among the best-supported in Ligue 1, and each has participated in European competition in recent years.

== Head-to-head record ==
As of 20 April 2025

Competition		Matches	Winners			Goals scored	
Competition		Matches	Lyon	Draw	Saint-Étienne	Lyon	Saint-Étienne
League	Ligue 1	114	42	32	40	137	141
League	Ligue 2	4	1	1	2	3	7
Coupe de France		5	3	1	1	9	3
Coupe Charles Drago		1	0	0	1	0	4
Trophée des Champions		1	0	0	1	0	3
Coupe de la Ligue		1	1	0	0	2	1
Total		126	47	34	45	151	159

== Switching clubs ==
Due to the clubs' ongoing rivalry, few players have played for Lyon and Saint-Étienne. Since the two clubs first contested each other in 1951, only 27 players have played for both Lyon and Saint-Étienne and only 13 players have transferred directly from Lyon to Saint-Étienne and vice versa. The first player to "commit" the offense was Antoine Rodriguez in 1951, when after having a nine-year spell at Saint-Étienne, he moved to Lyon, where he spent only one season. Other notable players who made the switch were Aimé Jacquet who, after having a successful 13-year career with Saint-Étienne, departed the club for Lyon, where he spent three seasons. Jacquet later went on to manage Lyon and coached the team to the 1973 Coupe de France Final. Similarly, striker Bernard Lacombe established himself as one of Lyon's all-time leading goalscorers before leaving the club for Saint-Étienne in 1978 where he was often booed and jeered, which led to the player departing the club for Bordeaux after one season. The other players who transferred directly between clubs are François Lemasson, Alain Moizan, André Calligaris, Romarin Billong, Jean-Luc Sassus, Christopher Deguerville, Grégory Coupet, Franck Priou, Lamine Diatta and Bafétimbi Gomis. Steed Malbranque, a product of Lyon youth system and a former Lyon first-team regular, signed for Saint-Étienne from Sunderland, but then resigned after one month, allegedly calling quit to his career. He surprisingly signed for Lyon a few months later.

=== OL, then ASSE ===
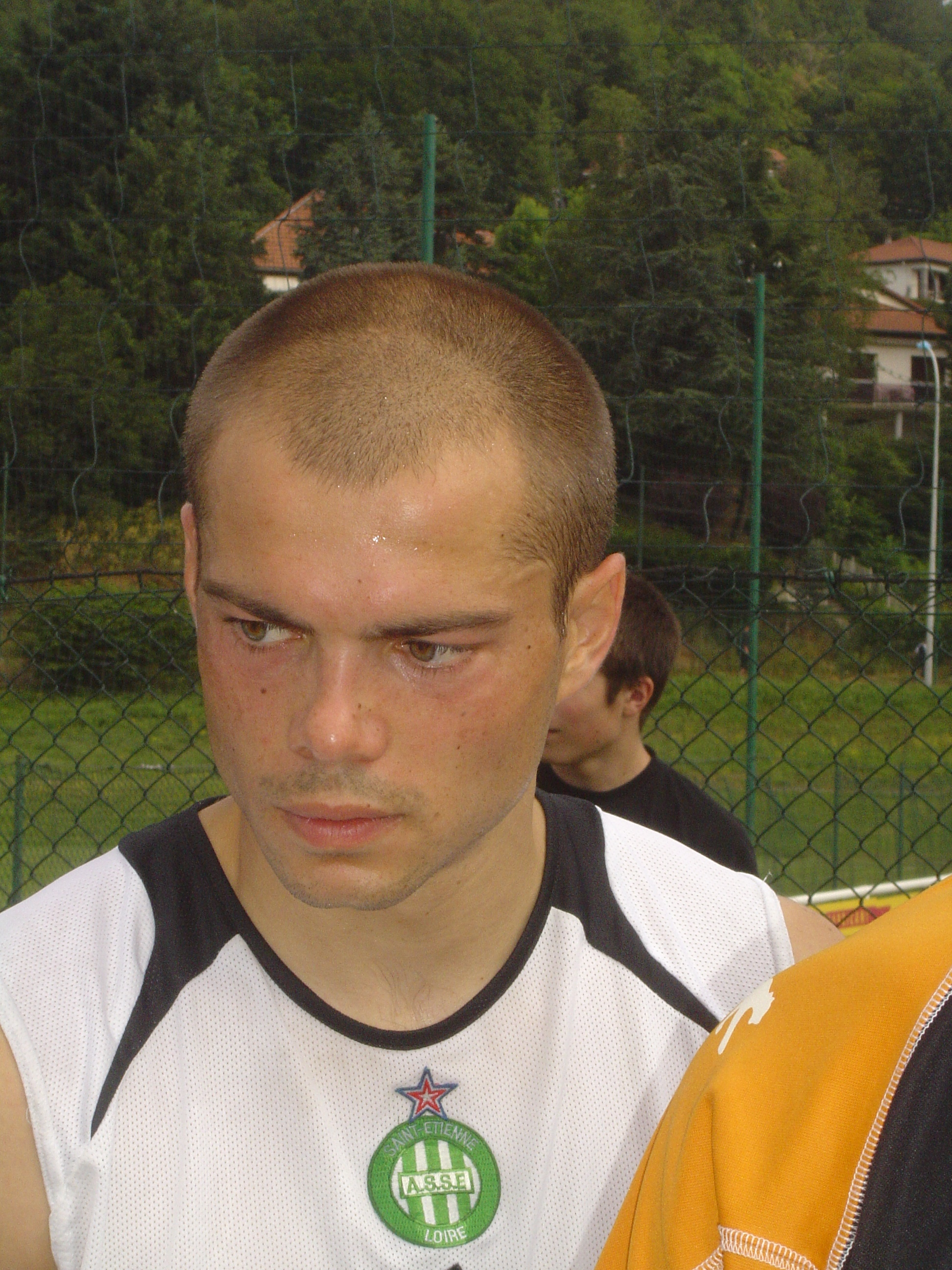
David Hellebuyck started his career at Lyon before making over 100 appearances with Saint-Étienne.

Name	Pos	Lyon			Saint-Étienne		
Name	Pos	Career	Apps	Goals	Career	Apps	Goals
(France) Bernard Lacombe	FW	1969–78	230	128	1978–79	32	14
(France) Alain Moizan	MF	1980–82	–	–	1982–84	–	–
(France) Franck Priou	MF	1980–88	–	–	1988–90	–	–
(France) Laurent Fournier	MF	1986–88	53	15	1995	10	3
(Cameroon) Romarin Billong	DF	1988–95	111	5	1995–2000	102	5
(France) Patrice Ferri	DF	1992–93	–	–	1995–96	–	–
(France) Jean-Luc Sassus	DF	1994–97	–	–	1997–98	–	–
(France) David Hellebuyck	MF	1996–2000	3	0	2001–06	167	14
(France) Laurent Morestin	DF	1997–98	3	0	2003–04	24	0
(France) Patrice Carteron	DF	1997–2000	101	6	2001–05	100	16
(Senegal) Lamine Diatta	DF	2004–06	40	0	2006–08	27	1
(France) Sylvain Monsoreau	DF	2005–06	19	0	2008–12	30	0
(France) Steed Malbranque	MF	1997–01	110	10	2011–12	1	0
(France) Mathieu Bodmer	MF	2007–10	91	8	2013	16	2
(France) François Clerc	DF	2005–09	78	1	2012–15	85	3
(France) Jérémy Clément	MF	2004–06	54	1	2011–17	192	1
(France) Timothée Kolodziejczak	DF	2008–12	14	0	2018–22	122	7
(France) Lenny Pintor	FW	2018–22	2	0	2022–23	22	1

=== ASSE, then OL ===
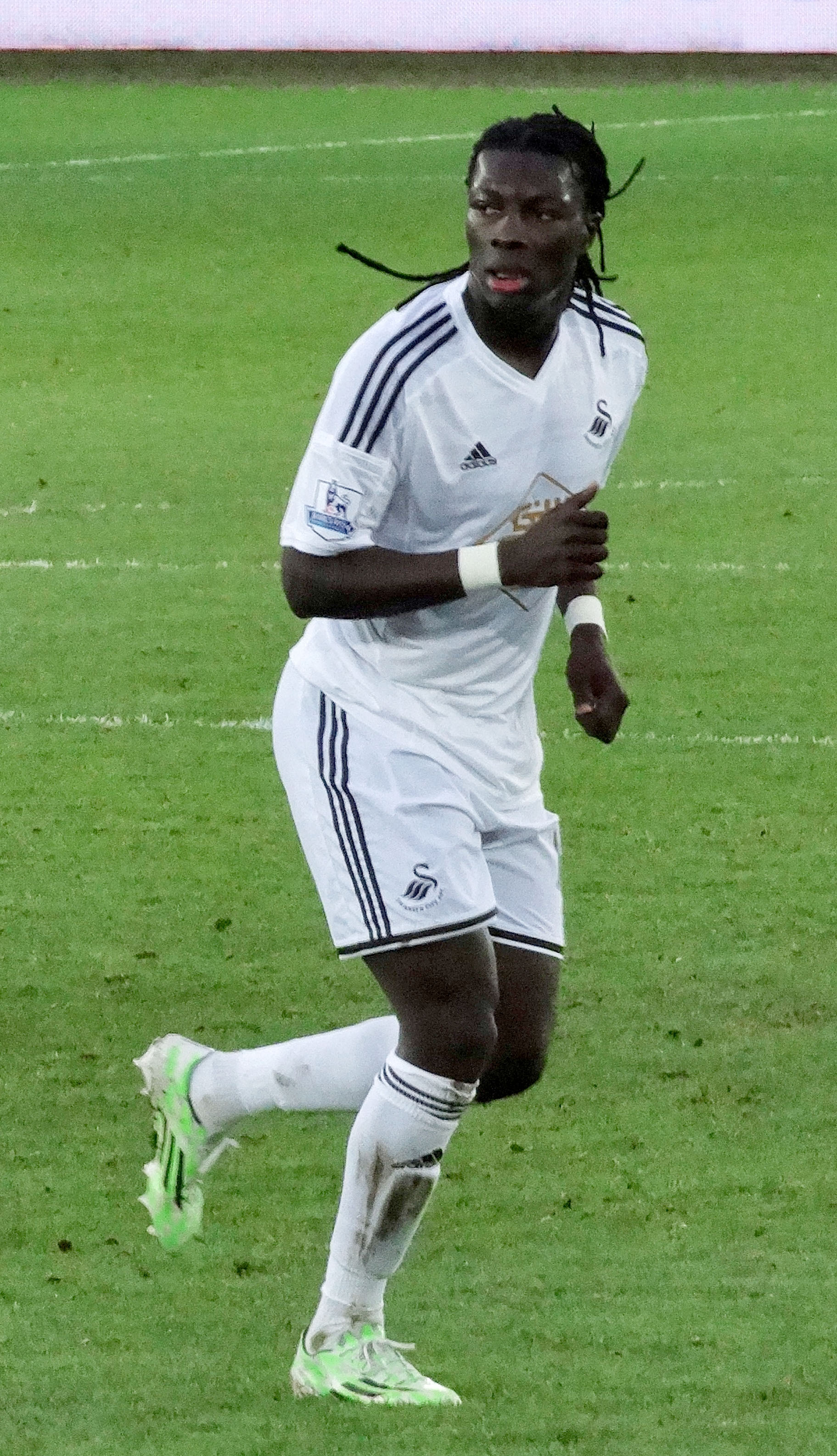
Bafétimbi Gomis joined Lyon from Saint-Étienne in 2009.

Name	Pos	Saint-Étienne			Lyon		
Name	Pos	Career	Apps	Goals	Career	Apps	Goals
(France) Michel Cristobal	DF	1945–49	–	–	1950–52	–	–
(France) Antoine Rodriguez	DF	1942–51	–	–	1951–52	–	–
(France) Andre Calligaris	DF	1957–60	–	–	1960–61	–	–
(France) Aimé Jacquet	MF	1960–73	176	12	1973–76	26	2
(France) André Guy	FW	1962–65	82	52	1967–71	116	66
(France) José Broissart	MF	1969–73	–	–	1976–80	–	–
(France) Jean-François Larios	MF	1973–83	167	36	1984–85	27	1
(France) Olivier Roussey	MF	1977–78	–	–	1979–80	–	–
(France) Patrice Ferri	DF	1981–88	–	–	1992–93	–	–
(France) François Lemasson	GK	1986–87	5	0	1987–90	101	0
(France) Christopher Deguerville	DF	1987–95	–	–	1995–97	–	–
(France) Grégory Coupet	GK	1993–97	88	0	1997–2008	518	0
(France) Frédéric Piquionne	FW	2004–07	97	27	2008–09	26	4
(Senegal) Pape Diakhaté	DF	2010	18	1	2010–11	3	0
(France) Bafétimbi Gomis	FW	2003–09	162	49	2009–14	244	95
(France) Steed Malbranque	MF	2011–12	1	0	2012–14	129	9
(France) Mouhamadou Dabo	DF	2005–10	123	1	2011–15	91	1
(France) Jordan Veretout	MF	2016–17	43	4	2024–25	38	2
