= Ford Comète =

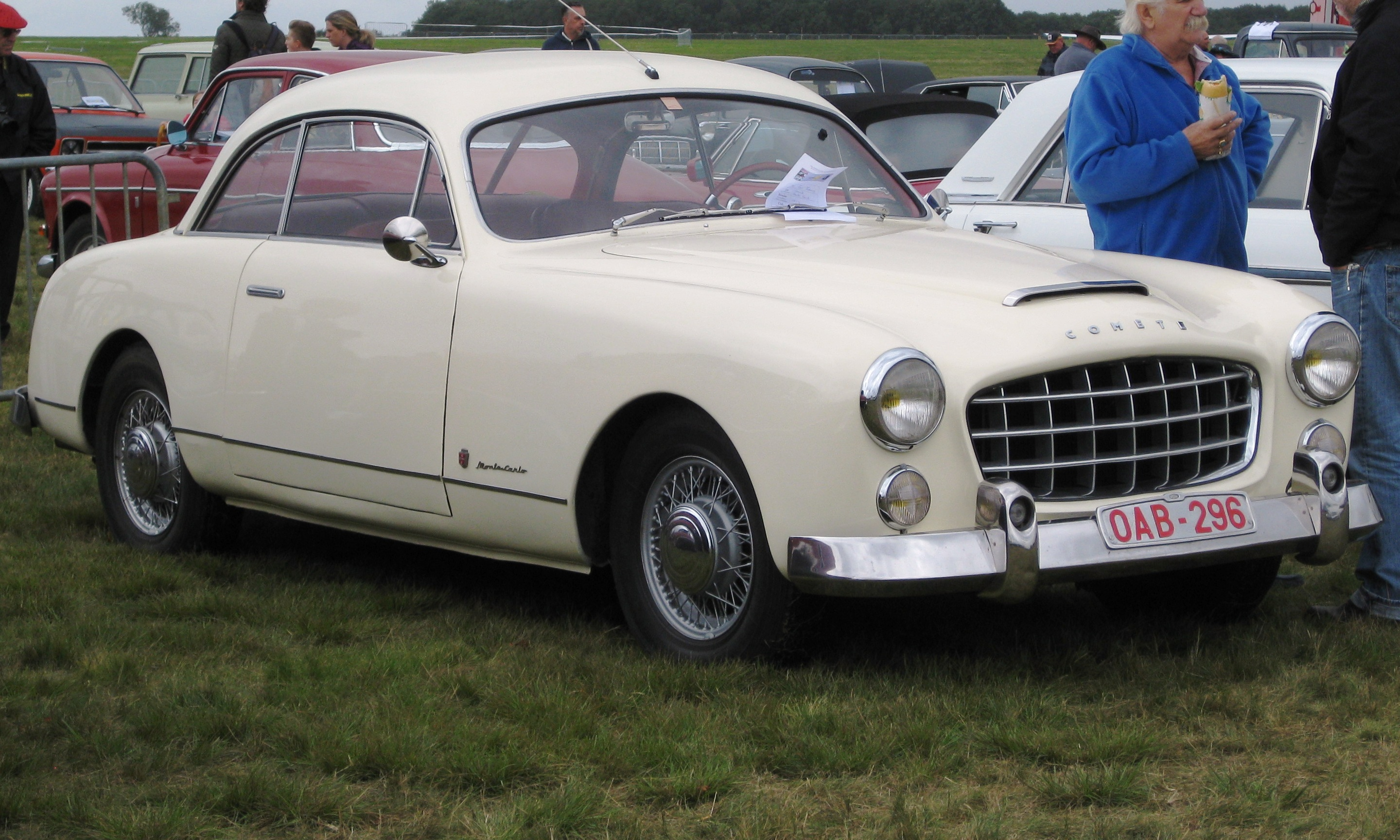
- 1954 Ford Comète Monte Carlo

Overview
- Manufacturer: Ford SAF
- Production: 1951–1954
- Assembly: France: Poissy, Yvelines (Poissy Plant)

Body and chassis
- Class: 4-seater sports car
- Body style: 2-door coupé 2-door cabriolet (only 2 produced)
- Layout: FR layout
- Related: Ford Vedette

Powertrain
- Engine: 2,158 cc Aquillon V8 till 1952; 2,355 cc Aquillon V8; 1952- 3,923 cc Mistral V8; 1953-1954
- Transmission: 4-speed manual

Dimensions
- Length: 4,620 mm (182 in)
- Width: 1,740 mm (69 in)
- Height: 1,420 mm (56 in)
- Curb weight: 1,290 kg (2,844 lb)

The Ford Comète (later known as the Simca Comète) is a car that was built between 1951 and 1954 in France by Ford SAF. Intended as the luxury model in the range, the Comète's bodywork was built by FACEL, who later produced the better-known Facel Vega luxury cars under their own name. The original engine was a 2.2 L V8 produced by Ford SAF of French design, also used in the Ford Vedette, with a Pont-à-Mousson 4-speed manual transmission fitted.

The original model had a single horizontal bar across the grille with a chromed shield or bullet in the centre, somewhat similar to contemporary Studebaker products, among others, with steel wheels and chromed hubcaps.

== 1953 changes ==
In October 1952, for the Paris Motor Show, the Comète appeared with an engine enlarged from 2,158 cc to 2,355 cc. Claimed horse-power was raised from 68 hp to 80 hp indicating that there was more to the engine upgrade than simply an increase in the cylinder bore from 66.0 mm to 67.9 mm. (The stroke remained unchanged at 81.3 mm.) The most obvious of several other engine enhancements at this stage was the increase in the compression ratio from 6.8 : 1 to 7.4 : 1, reflecting the appearance of slightly higher octane fuels. Torque and engine flexibility were also improved and the claimed top speed increased from 130 km/h (81 mph) to 145 km/h (90 mph).

== 1954 changes ==
Available from the start of 1954, a new "Monte-Carlo" model appeared with the 3,923 cc V8 engine normally fitted to Ford trucks; this engine, befitting its truck heritage, delivered 78 kW (105 hp) with plenty of torque. Performance was much improved, but the new engine did not endear itself to buyers of the car having a "truck engine", The engine's large displacement meant that its taxed horsepower rating imposed by the French government was 22CV, giving a high road tax in a country where government taxation policy, especially after 1948, was high for cars with engine sizes above 2 litres. This new model was fitted with wire wheels, a fake hood scoop, and a typical for the time Ford egg-crate grille, consisting of vertical and horizontal equally spaced bars. The French called this grille a "coupe-frites": a "french-fry cutter".

== Commercial ==
The Comète combined the elegant style of a body by Facel with the mechanical underpinnings of the Ford Vedette, combined with a shortened wheelbase. The rear seat was stylishly designed, especially on the upmarket "Monte-Carlo" version with its two-colour leather seat covers, but nevertheless offered insufficient leg space for adults, other than on the shortest and most unavoidable of journeys. The economy was beginning to grow robustly by the mid-1950s, but the market capacity for cars of this size remained small and Comète sales were correspondingly modest. Above all, it was handicapped by a list price that was (in October 1953) 65% higher than that for the mechanically similar Vedette. Customers interested in the larger engined 3,923 cc versions were faced with a price for the "Monte-Carlo" (once it became available at the start of 1954) that was 51% higher than that of the spacious four door Vendôme.

== Change of manufacturer ==
During 1954, Ford SAF was sold, and the Comète's final year of production took place under Simca. The Simca Comète Monte-Carlo continued to be offered till July 1955.

== Gallery ==
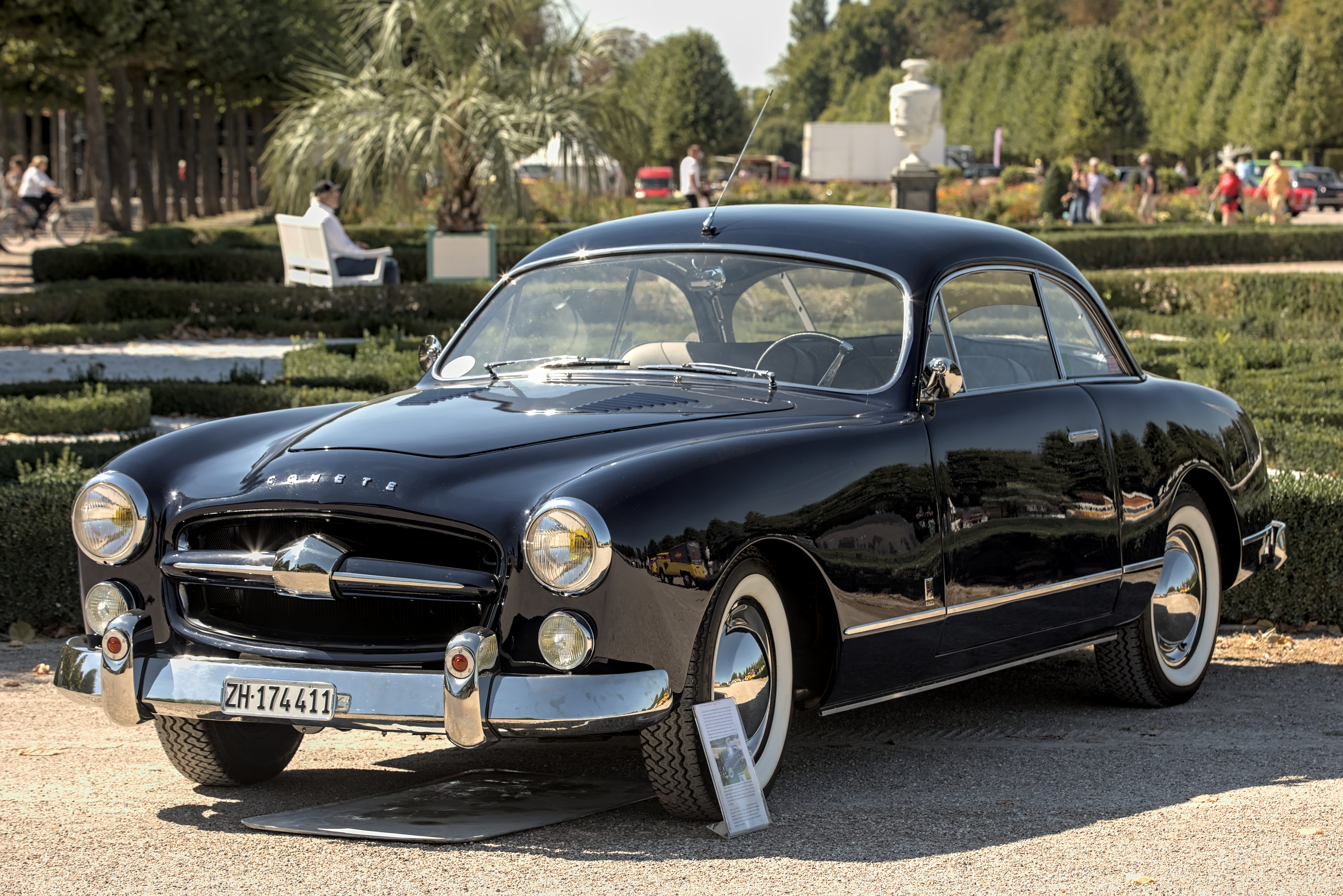
Ford Comète

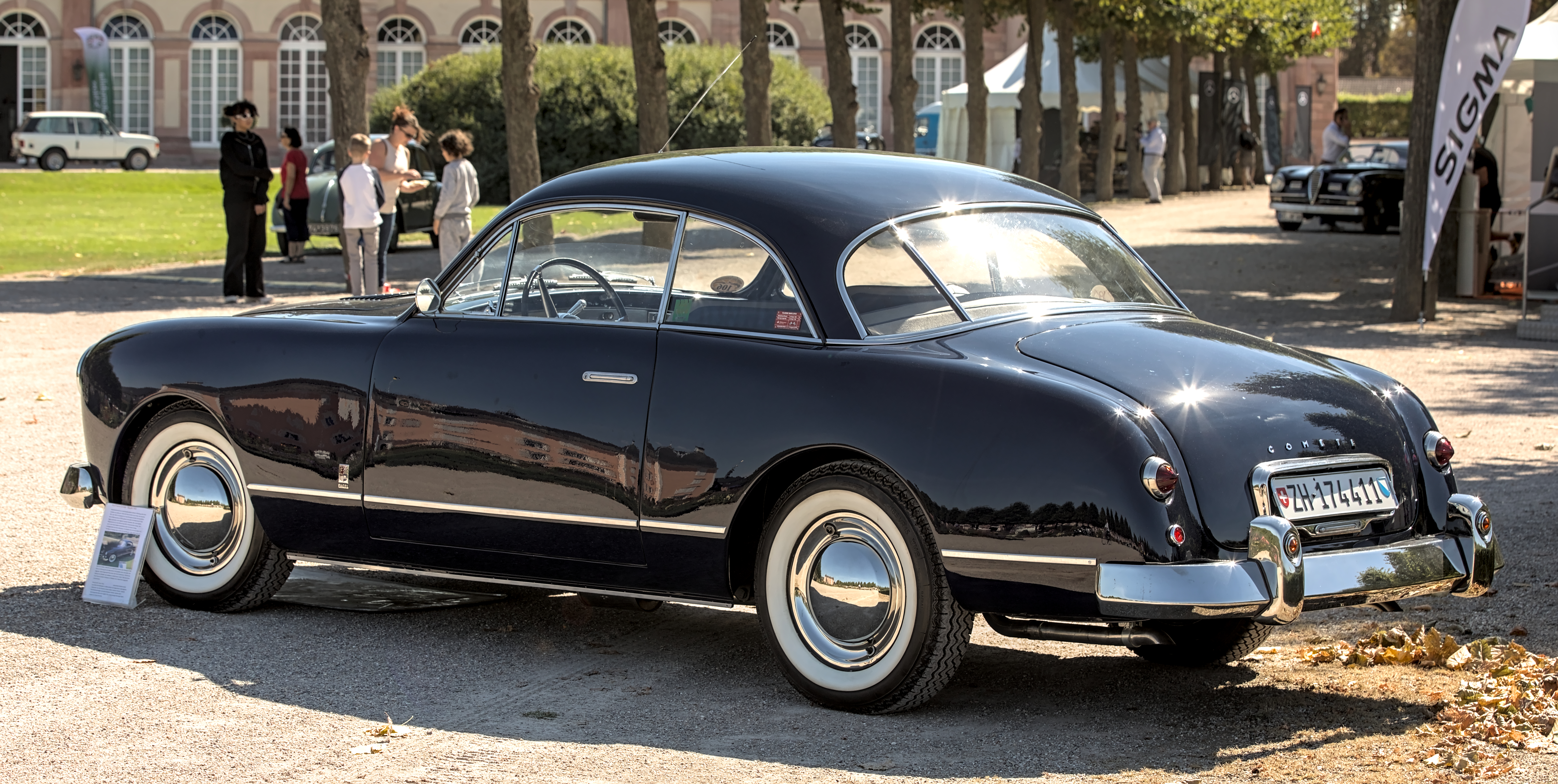
Ford Comète rear

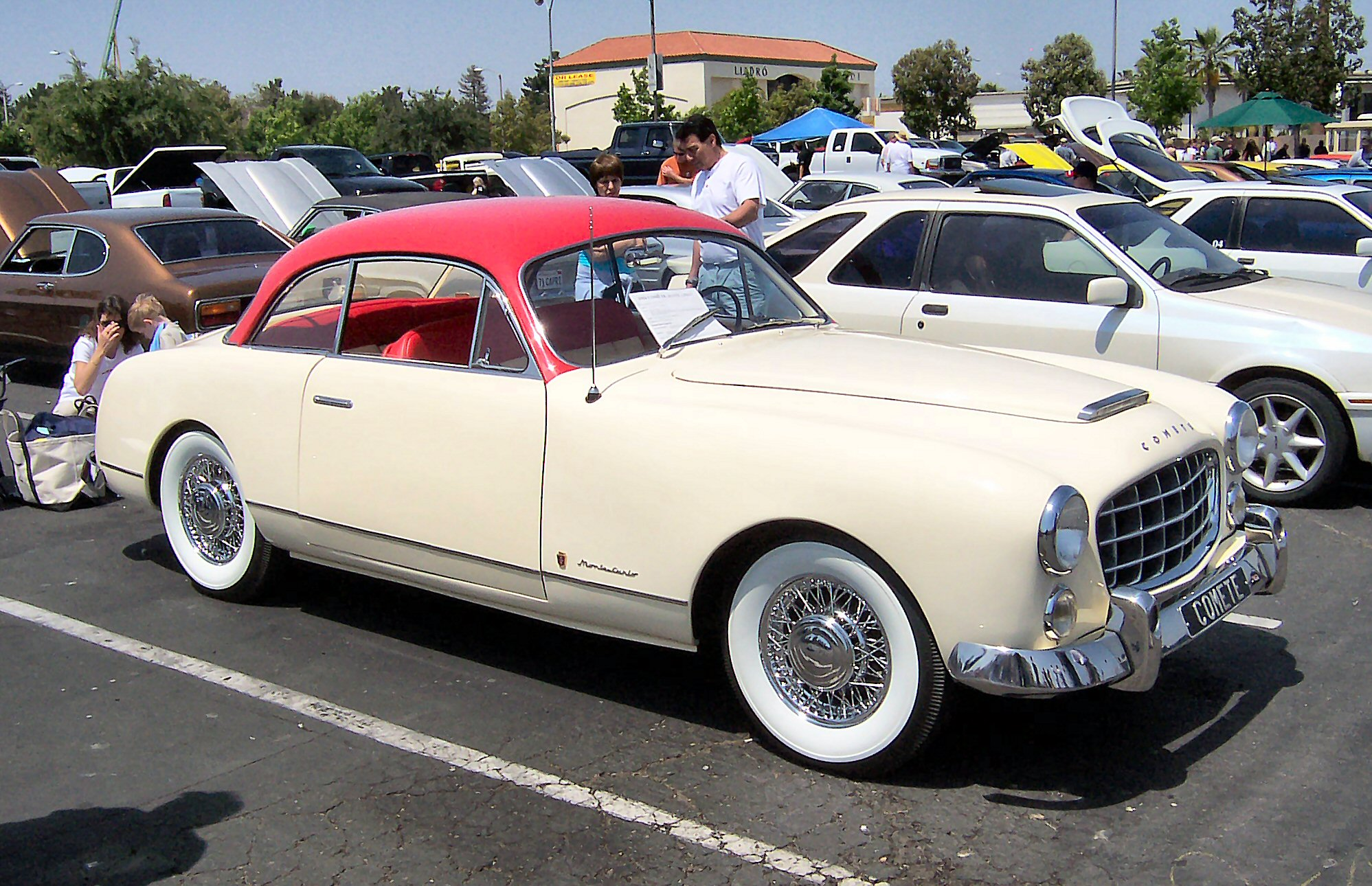
Ford Comète

== See also ==
- 1950 Ford
- Ford Zephyr Mark I
- Ford Taunus
