= J-P Wimille =

French automobile manufacturer

The J-P Wimille was a French automobile manufactured from 1946 until 1950. Powered by a rear-mounted 22 hp Ford V-8, it was an aerodynamic saloon designed by racing driver Jean-Pierre Wimille. No more than 20 were built. Some of the cars appeared after Wimille's death in the 1953 film "Les amours finissent à l'aube".

== Company history ==
The racing driver Jean-Pierre Wimille founded the company for the production of automobiles in Paris in 1946. The brand name was Wimille. In 1948, a vehicle was displayed at the Paris Motor Show. After Wimille's death in 1949, only a few examples were produced. Production ended in 1950. A total of about eight vehicles were built.

== Vehicles ==
The company produced two-seater, closed sports cars with mid-engine, as Wimille was enthusiastic about the mid-engine concept. The prototype from 1946 had a four-cylinder engine of the Citroën 11 CV with 1911 cc displacement and 54 hp. With this engine, the top speed was set at 150 km/h. Later, Ford supported the project, so that a V8 engine from the Ford Vedette with 2158 cc displacement and 60 to 66 hp was used.

Wimille models

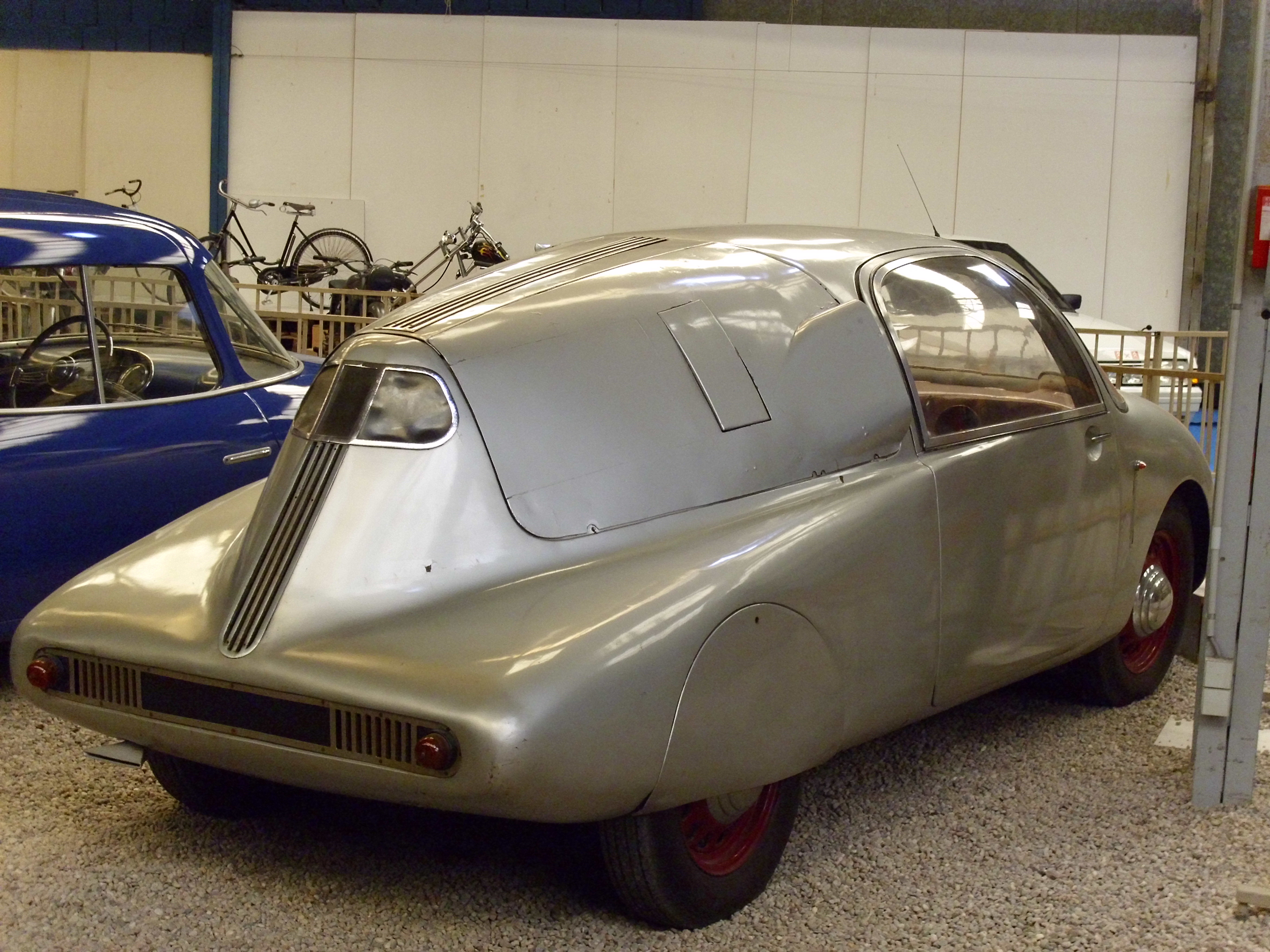
1946 back

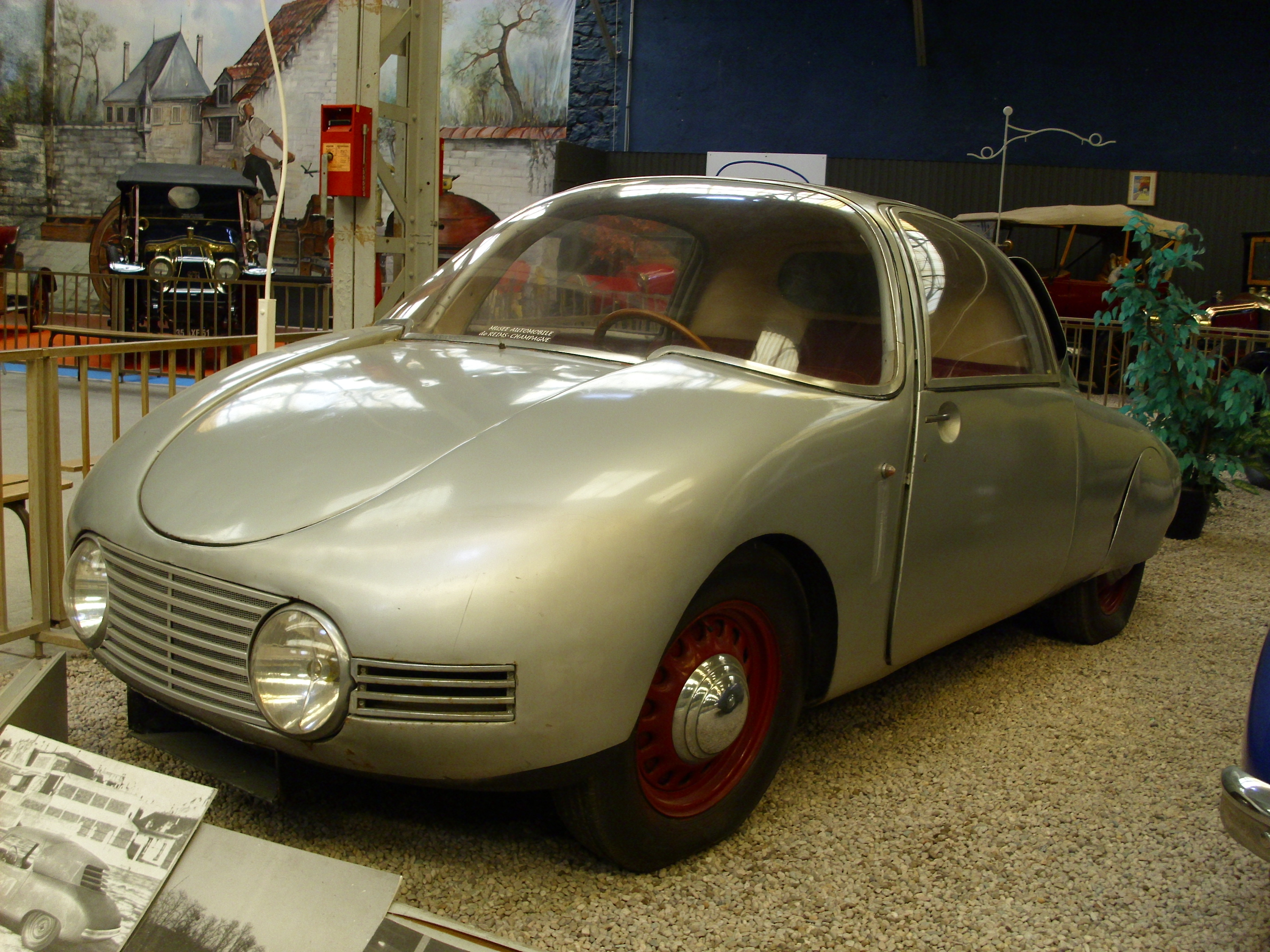
1946 front

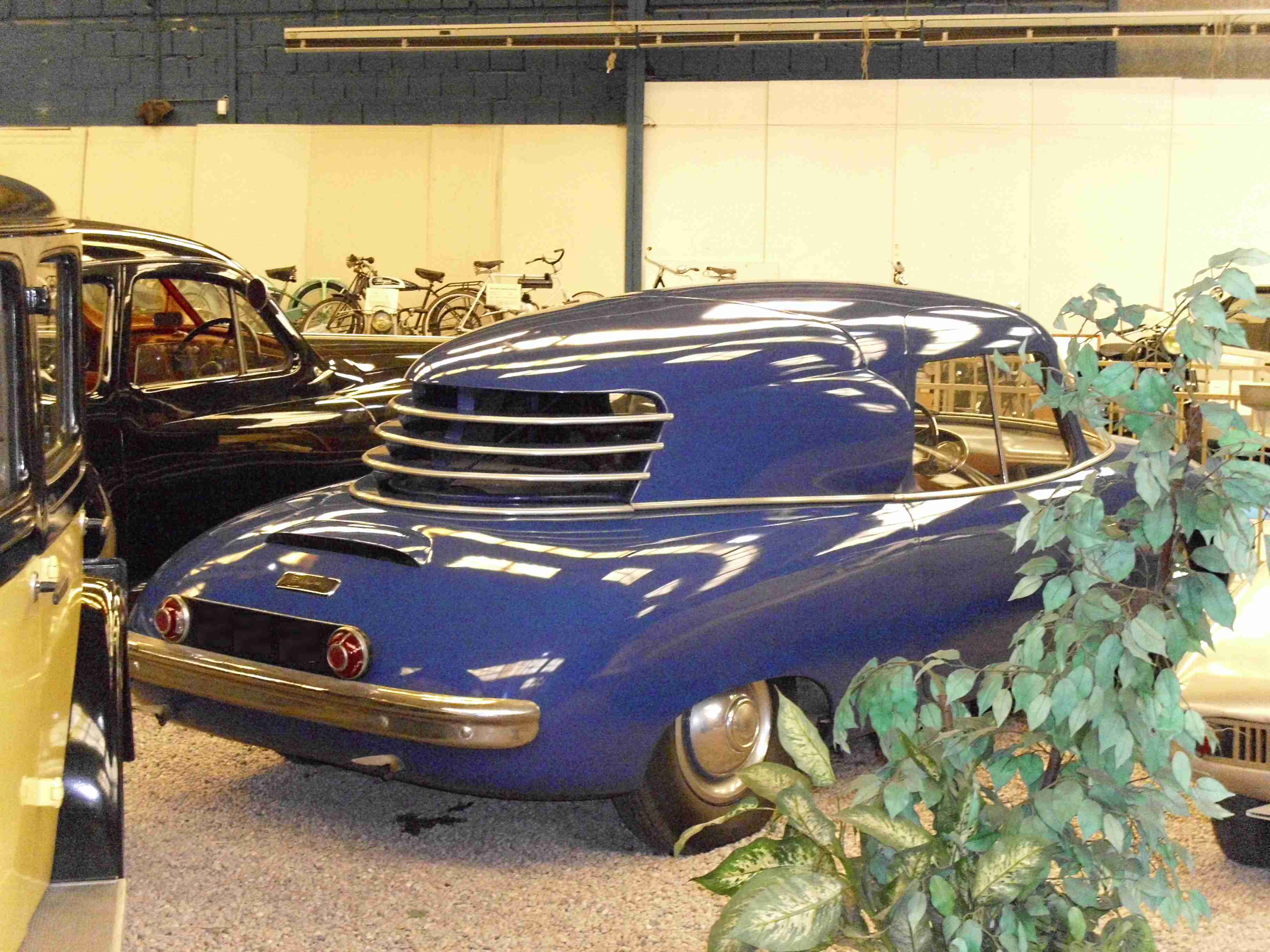
1947 back

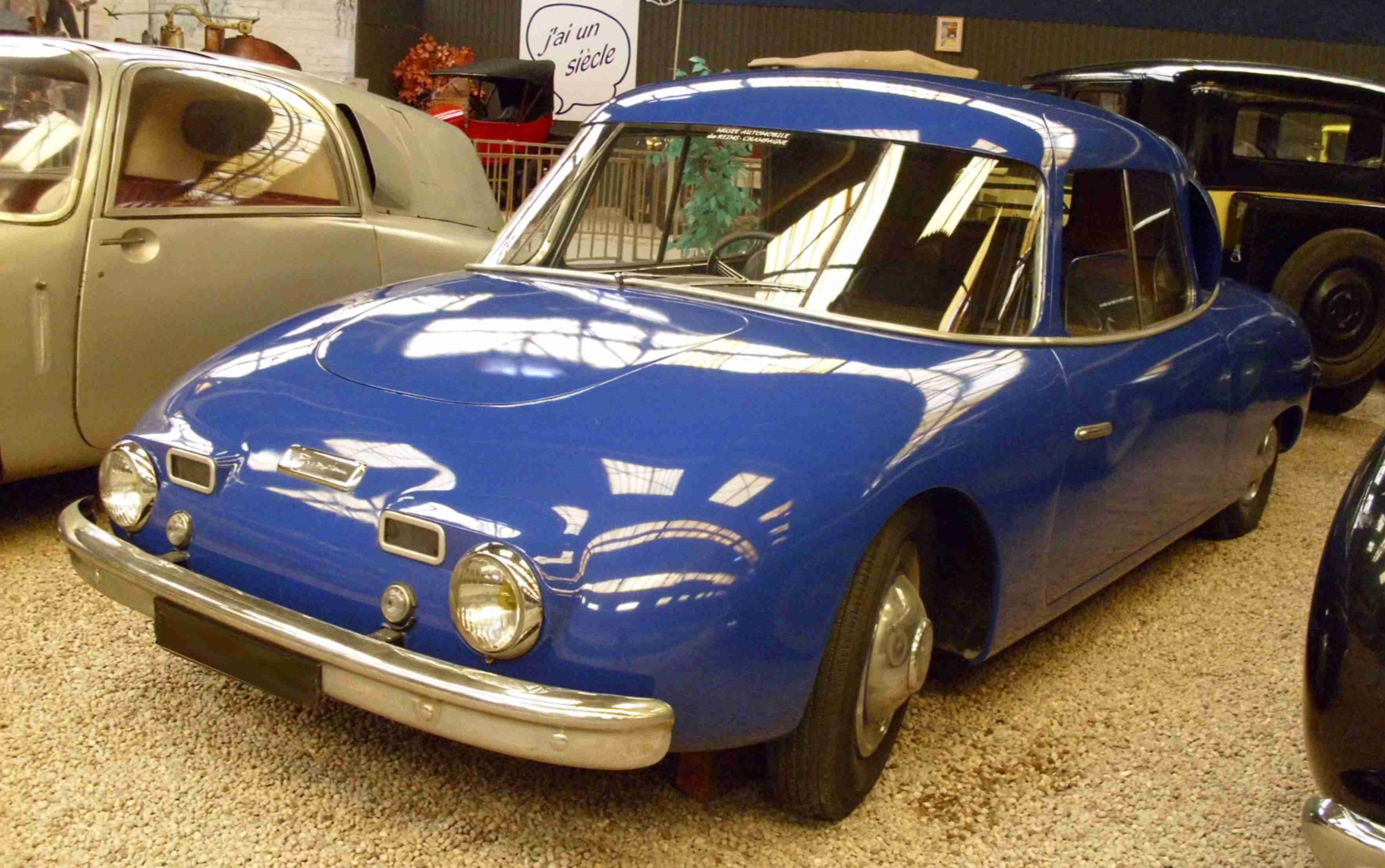
1947 front

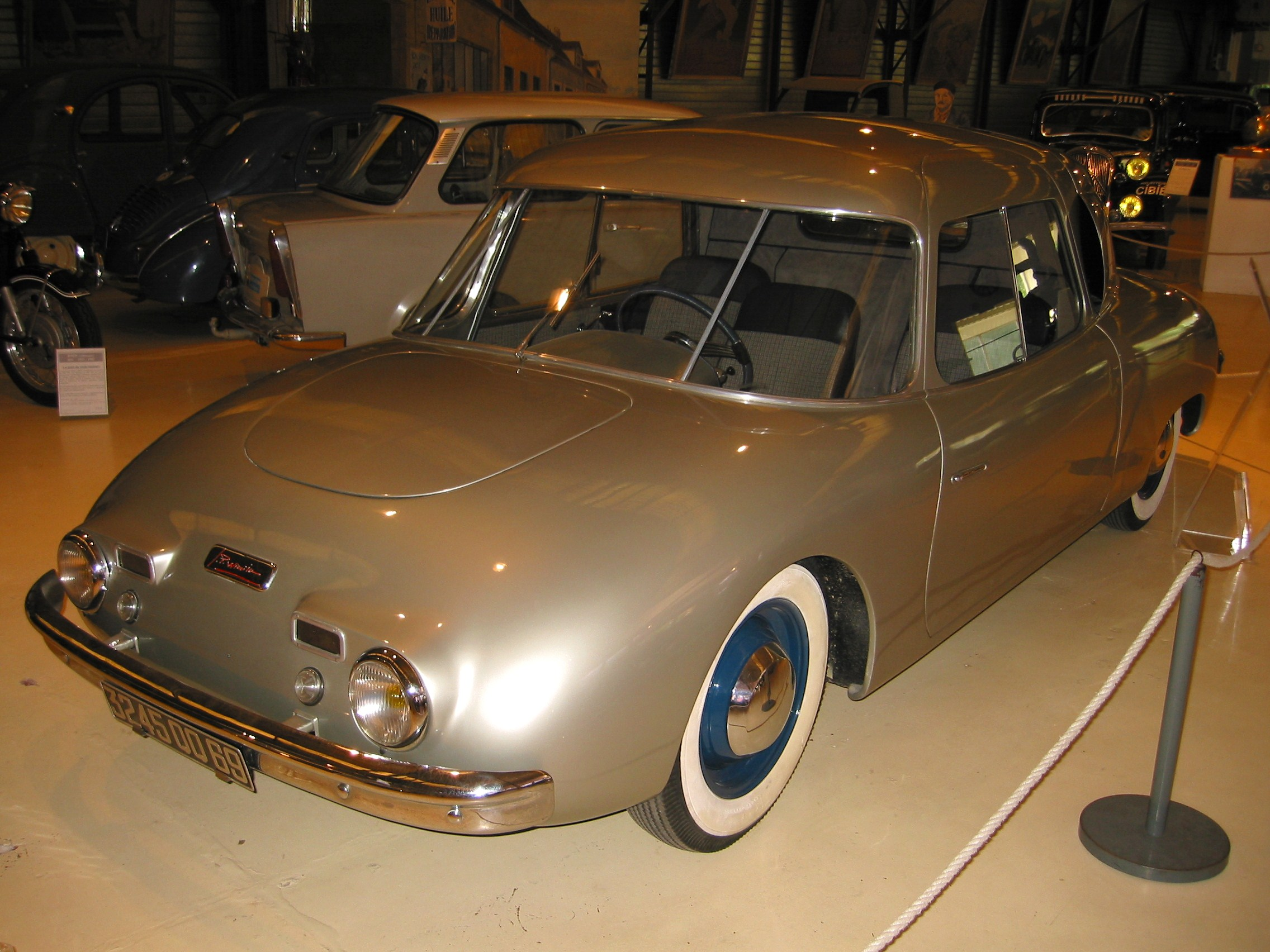
1948 front

== Literature ==
- Roger Gloor: Nachkriegswagen 1945–1960. Hallwag Verlag, Bern und Stuttgart 1986, ISBN 3-444-10263-1.
- Harald H. Linz, Halwart Schrader: . United Soft Media Verlag, Munich 2008, ISBN 978-3-8032-9876-8.
- George Nick Georgano (Editor-in-Chief): The Beaulieu Encyclopedia of the Automobile. Volume 3: P–Z. Fitzroy Dearborn Publishers, Chicago 2001, ISBN 1-57958-293-1. (English)
- George Nick Georgano: Cars. Encyclopédie complète. 1885 à nos jours. Courtille, Paris 1975. (French)
