= Enoch N'Dengila =

Congolese footballer

Personal information
- Date of birth: 5 February 1989 (age 37)
- Place of birth: Kinshasa, Zaire
- Height: 1.78 m (5 ft 10 in)
- Position: Striker

Youth career
- Troyes

Senior career*
Years	Team	Apps	(Gls)
2009–2010	Quimper	15	(0)
2010–2011	Poissy	15	(2)
2011–2013	Dijon	3	(0)
2013–2015	Avranches	41	(6)
2016	Le Mans	15	(3)
- * Club domestic league appearances and goals

Enoch N'Dengila (born 5 February 1989) is a former Congolese professional footballer who played as a striker.

== Career ==
He has spent his entire career in the French leagues, including a spell with Dijon between 2011 and 2013 during which he made three appearances in Ligue 2.

He joined Le Mans in January 2016, and made 15 league appearances before leaving in December to "take his life in a different direction".

=== Later career ===
In August 2020, N'Dengila played a few friendly matches for French club OFC Les Mureaux, although he never played any official matches for the club. During 2020, as well as in 2022 and 2023, N'Dengila played matches for French amateur club FC Novuus Chambourcy.

N'Dengila has also worked as a youth coach at his childhood club Poissy.
