= Ford Vendôme =

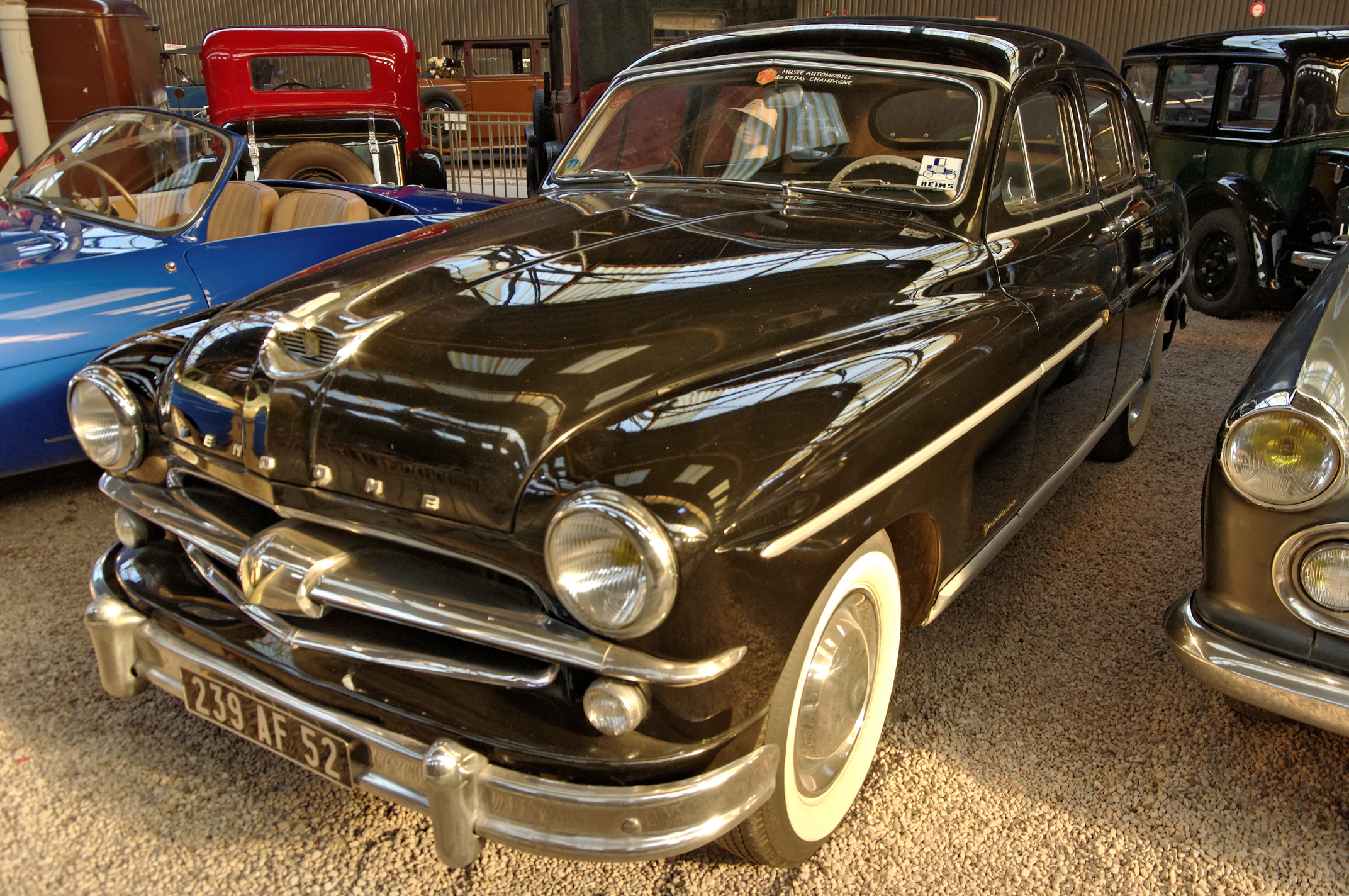

Overview
- Manufacturer: Ford SAF
- Production: 1953–1954

Body and chassis
- Class: Large car
- Body style: 4-door saloon/sedan
- Layout: FR layout
- Related: Ford Comete; Ford Vedette

Powertrain
- Engine: 3923 cc Mistral V8
- Transmission: 3-speed manual

Dimensions
- Wheelbase: 2,690 mm (106 in)
- Length: 4,670 mm (184 in)
- Width: 1,720 mm (68 in)
- Height: 1,570 mm (62 in)
- Curb weight: 1,350 kg (2,980 lb)

Chronology
- Successor: Simca Vedette Régence

The Ford Vendôme is a large car that was manufactured by Ford SAF at their plant in Poissy, France, from 1953 until 1954.

== Launch ==
Introduced in October at the 1953 Mondial de l’Automobile in Paris, the Vendôme would undoubtedly have been the star of the Ford stand were it not for the manufacturer's decision to fly in an eye catching futuristic prototype from Detroit called the X-100 which seems to have been the more effective show stealer.

Despite sharing the modern – if to modern eyes heavy looking – body of the Vedette, the Vendôme featured a more elaborate front treatment involving a greater quantity of chrome. Inside, the bench seats were covered by materials of two contrasting colours and the rear bench seat (though not the front one) featured a thick central foldable arm-rest. These, along with detailed differences on the instrument panel, differentiated the Vendôme. A distinguishing and, at the time in France, novel feature which only became apparent after dark was the inclusion of reversing lights which came on automatically when reverse gear was selected.

== Engine ==
The Vendôme used the well-tried formula of combining an existing model—in this case the Ford Vedette—with a larger engine in order to improve the performance. Fitting a larger engine in the existing engine bay was no problem, and for Ford there was little investment needed, since the engine used was the Flathead V8 side-valve engine of which millions had been made worldwide and which, in this “Mistral” form, was already powering Detroit's 1953 Ford Crestline and Ford's F-Series truck line. Maximum output in this form was listed as 93 bhp (69 kW; 94 PS) or 37% more than the 68 bhp (51 kW; 69 PS) of the Vedette. This translated into a claimed top speed of 148 km/h (92 mph) which in 1950s France was little short of eye watering for a large heavy six seater sedan. Acceleration was also impressive, even at low engine speeds, reflecting strong low-range torque. Fuel consumption was also eye-watering, however, and while drivers cruising below 80 km/h (50 mph) consumed fuel at little more than the rate achieved in the less powerful Vedette, there were reports of high speed cruising giving rise to a consumption figure of 25.0 litres per 100 kilometres (11.3 mpg_{‑imp}; 9.4 mpg_{‑US}).

== Driving experience ==
The effortless power would have provided a pleasing contrast with other cars available in France, especially in mountainous areas or when overtaking.

The car shared the independent front suspension incorporating MacPherson struts of the Vedette on which this configuration had first appeared. However, the larger engine resulted in a weight increase of more than 100 kg, all of it over the front wheels. It was more of a handful on twisty roads than the Vedette, and the front brakes on the Vendôme showed some tendency to overheating, though neither of these issues was serious enough, in the context of the standards of the time, to be considered dangerous.

== Commercial ==
Priced, in 1953, at 1,148,500 francs, the Ford Vendôme outperformed traditional French luxury cars of this size, such as the six-cylinder Hotchkiss Anjou 20.50 saloon/sedan, despite being listed at only two thirds of the price. While the six-cylinder Hotchkiss was withdrawn from sale at the end of 1953 (the much slower, less costly four-cylinder version lingered on only till 1954), approximately 3,000 Ford Vendôme found buyers during the 1954 model year. Unfortunately for the Vendôme, however, 1954 was also the year in which Henry Ford sold his French business to Simca. Simca persisted and succeeded with the Vedette and its successor, but operating in a country with high fuel taxes, were not persuaded to persist with a model featuring the larger fuel-hungry Ford developed V8 unit. The Ford Vendôme is therefore now rare.
