= Ford Abeille =

Ford Abeille (France)

Overview
- Manufacturer: Ford SAF
- Also called: Ford Vedette
- Production: 1952–1954
- Assembly: Poissy, France

Body and chassis
- Class: Mid-sized hatchback
- Body style: 5-door hatchback
- Related: Ford Vedette

Powertrain
- Engine: 2.2 L Aquilon s/v V8

The Ford Abeille (French for Bee, model code F492C) is a sedan with a two-piece opening tailgate at the rear and downmarket trim intended as a commercial variant of the Vedette that was produced and sold in the French market between 1952 and 1954. The bodystyle is similar to that of the 1949 Kaiser Traveler. In addition to the tailgate and durable interior, the rearmost side windows were covered from the interior (the glazing remained), almost all chrome elements were replaced with painted pieces, and the Vedette's grille was replaced with a simple mesh.

The Abeille had been preceded by a short-lived, simplified, "agricultural" version of the Vedette which was presented at the October 1951 Paris Salon. The Abeille, which was first shown in June 1952, had a payload of 500 kg (1,102 lb). The Vedette's 2.1-liter V8 engine was fitted with a different intake manifold and carburetor, lowering power but increasing fuel economy and longevity, as well as allowing for a lower tax rating of 12CV. For the abbreviated 1954 model year, the Abeille was updated and received the same grille as the regular Vedette, while the B-post was removed for a larger side opening.

Produced by Ford’s French subsidiary based on their earlier Vedette sedan which was itself an abandoned US project to make a cheap post-war car. It ended production after Ford decided to abandon its French factory in 1954 and sold it to Simca.
