= Silas Billong =

French footballer (born 1974)

Personal information
- Date of birth: 13 September 1974 (age 51)
- Place of birth: Lyon, France
- Height: 1.83 m (6 ft 0 in)
- Position: Defender

Senior career*
Years	Team	Apps	(Gls)
1994-1995	Saint-Priest		
1995-1996	Rodez AF		
1996-1997	Toulouse B		
1997-1998	SAS Épinal		
1998-1999	Mulhouse		
1999-2000	Limoges		
2000-2002	La Roche VF	59	(4)
2002-2003	Reims	27	(1)
2003-2005	Brest	25	(1)
2005-2006	Limoges		
- * Club domestic league appearances and goals

Silas Billong (born 13 September 1974) is a French former professional footballer who played as a defender. After his retirement from playing, Billong became a referee. His brother, Romarin, was also a professional footballer.

== Playing career ==
=== Early career ===
Born in Lyon, Billong began his footballing career with local side Saint-Priest, who he played with for a season before leaving to join Championnat National side Rodez AF. The following season, he was on the move again, this time joining Ligue 2 outfit Toulouse's reserve team, with whom he also only lasted one year before returning to the National with SAS Épinal.

=== Championnat National ===
After a year with SAS Épinal, Billong remained in the National by joining Mulhouse for the 1998-99 season, after which he dropped to the CFA with Limoges for a season, before returning back to the National on a more stable two-year contract with La Roche VF.

=== Reims ===
In 2002-03, having spent two seasons with La Roche, Billong would have his first and only taste of professional football with Ligue 2 side Reims, with whom he would make his professional debut in a season in which he made 27 league appearances and scored once.

=== Late playing career ===
Following his one season with Reims, Billong never again played professionally, instead dropping back to the National for two seasons with Brest, before playing one final season with Limoges, by then in the CFA 2.

== Refereeing career ==
Finding himself without a club in 2006, Billong decided to give up his playing career in favour of retraining as a referee, a career which had long interested him but which is very rare amongst former professional footballers. He started off refereeing lower division matches in the west of France, before gradually climbing up through the ranks. On the 10 August 2008, he oversaw his first CFA match between Bordeaux B and Vendée Fontenay. During the 2008-09 season, he was also called to referee his first National match, a fixture between his former side Rodez AF and FC Libourne. Starting in 2009, he moved up a level to Fédérale 3, therefore becoming a permanent referee at the National level.

On the 4 March 2011, the French Elite Football Referees Union announced in a letter to the French Football Federation (FFF) that they would delay the kickoffs of Ligue 1 and Ligue 2 matches that weekend, to protest the players' lack of respect and to exert pressure, demanding a pay raise. This would cause the FFF and the LFP to take the decision to remove all Fédérale 1 referees from their matches, and instead call National referees up to replace them. Consequently, Billong found himself taking charge of the 5 March fixture between Nice and Lens, which is his only Ligue 1 refereeing post to date.

== Personal life ==
Billong's brother, Romarin, was also a professional footballer who played for Lyon and Saint-Etienne and represented the Cameroon national team.
