= Roman Yalovenko =

Ukrainian footballer

Personal information
- Full name: Roman Ruslanovych Yalovenko
- Date of birth: 8 February 1997 (age 29)
- Place of birth: Warsaw, Poland
- Height: 1.82 m (6 ft 0 in)
- Position: Attacking midfielder

Team information
- Current team: Poissy

Youth career
- 2007: Dynamo-2 Kyiv
- 2008–2009: Dynamo Kyiv
- 2010: Lokomotyv Kyiv
- 2010–2013: Atlet Kyiv
- 2013: Lokomotyv-2 Kyiv
- 2013–2014: Atlet Kyiv

Senior career*
Years	Team	Apps	(Gls)
2015	Metalurh Donetsk	0	(0)
2015–2016	Stal Dniprodzerzhynsk	0	(0)
2016–2019	Shakhtar Donetsk	0	(0)
2019	Avanhard Bziv	1	(2)
2020–2021	Chornomorets Odesa	16	(4)
2021	Olimpik Donetsk	17	(3)
2022	Alians Lypova Dolyna	0	(0)
2022–	Poissy	4	(1)
- * Club domestic league appearances and goals as of 16 May 2022

Roman Ruslanovych Yalovenko (Ukrainian: Роман Русланович Яловенко; born 8 February 1997) is a Ukrainian professional footballer who plays as an attacking midfielder for Championnat National 1 club Poissy.
