= Ford Vedette =

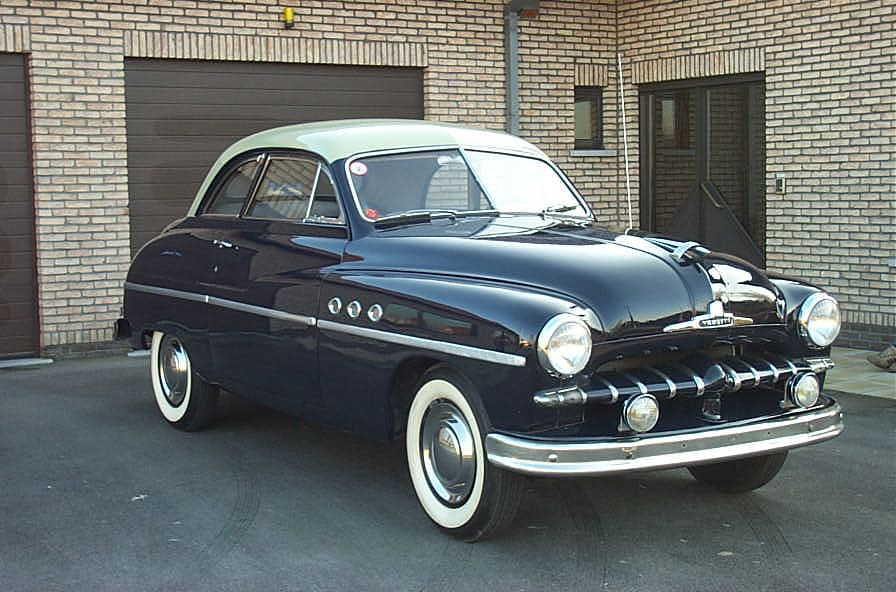

Overview
- Manufacturer: Ford SAF
- Production: 1948–1954
- Assembly: France: Poissy, Yvelines (Poissy Plant)

Body and chassis
- Class: Large car
- Body style: 4-door hatchback 4-door saloon 4-door landaulet 5-door estate 2-door coupé 2-door cabriolet
- Layout: FR layout
- Related: Ford Comète; Simca Vedette; Ford Vendôme; Simca Ariane; Chrysler Esplanada

Powertrain
- Engine: 2.2 L Aquilon s/v V8; 3.9 L Mistral s/v V8
- Transmission: 3-speed manual

Dimensions
- Wheelbase: 2,690 mm (105.9 in)
- Length: 4,500 mm (177.2 in) till 1952; 4,670 mm (183.9 in) from 1952
- Width: 1,720 mm (67.7 in)
- Height: 1,570 mm (61.8 in)
- Curb weight: 1,180 kg (2,601 lb)

Chronology
- Successor: Simca Vedette

The Ford Vedette is a large car formerly manufactured by Ford SAF in their Poissy plant from 1948 to 1954.

Originally conceived by Edsel Ford and Ford designer Eugene T. "Bob" Gregorie as a “light” Ford model, smaller than the 1942 Ford. However, Edsel Ford died in 1943, and following the war Ford corporate felt the light car project would pull sales from the full size Ford. Additionally, Henry Ford II felt that Gregorie’s planned 1949 Ford, which shared the same character lines as the Light Ford, was too large for its market, as was Gregorie’s proposed 1949 Mercury. To that end, the planned Ford and Mercury lines were pushed to Mercury and Lincoln, and a contest held to design a Ford that would be at once smaller than the Mercury, but larger than the Light Ford. To recoup the cost of Light Ford, that car was transferred to Ford France.

Introduced at the 1948 Salon de l'automobile in Paris, it was designed entirely in Detroit (resembling contemporary Mercury models) and featured the Poissy-made 2158 cc Aquillon sidevalve V8 engine of Ford's Flathead engine family, the same as in pre-war Matford cars. It was the only French car of its time with a V8 engine.

== First years of production ==
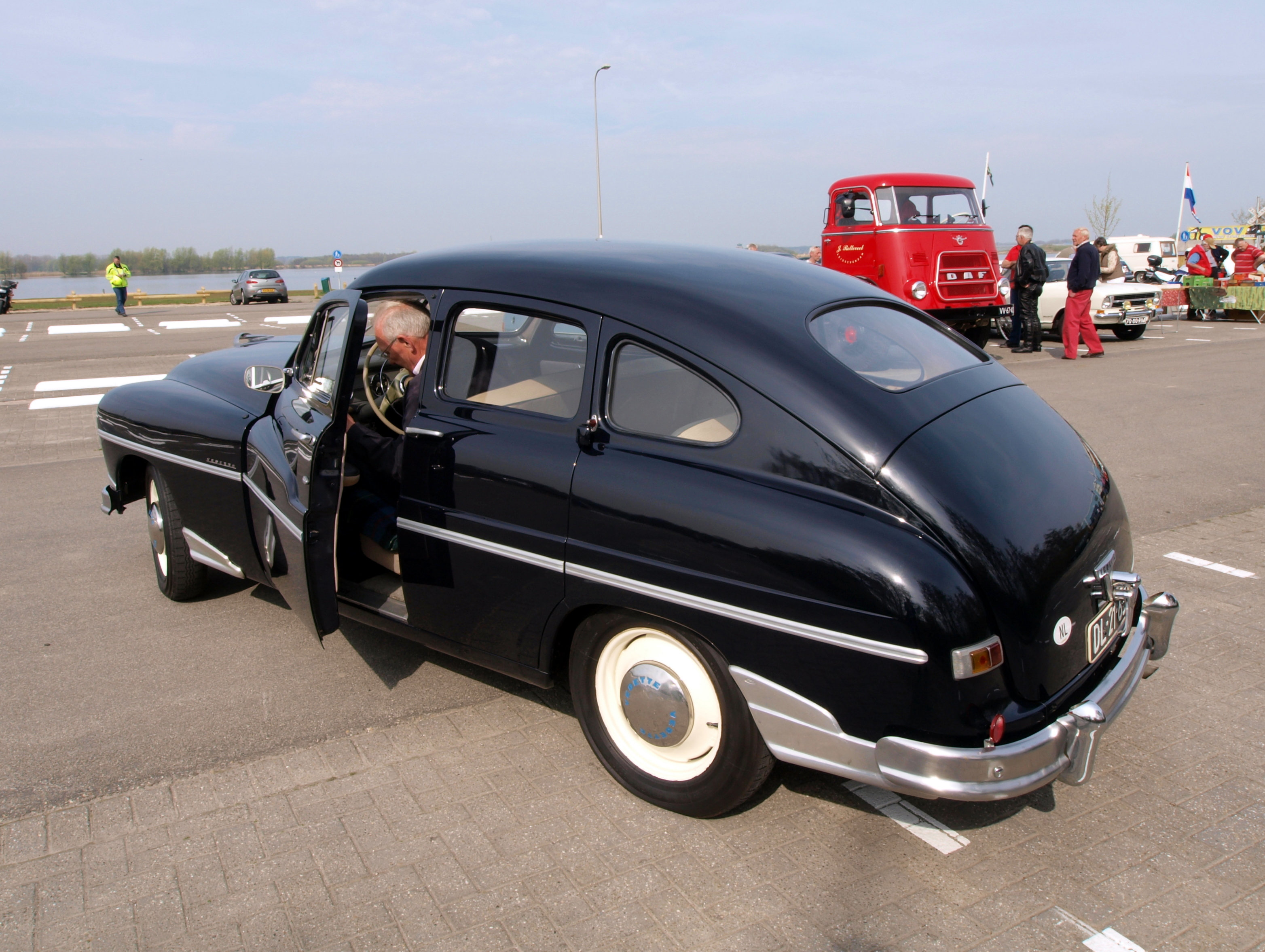
Ford Vedette Sedan 1952.

Because the Poissy factory could not resume complete automobile production immediately after World War II and had no stamping equipment, many vital components had still to be made by various subcontractors, which reportedly had an adverse effect on the quality of the car and contributed to its limited popularity. Over the six years in production, the Vedette was available in several body styles, ranging from the original four-door fastback (with rear suicide doors) through the later four-door saloon, a Sunliner two-door landaulet based on the saloon (with a roll-down roof over the entire cabin), a two-door Coupé and, based on it, the Cabriolet Décapotable (a two-door convertible).

== 1950s updates ==
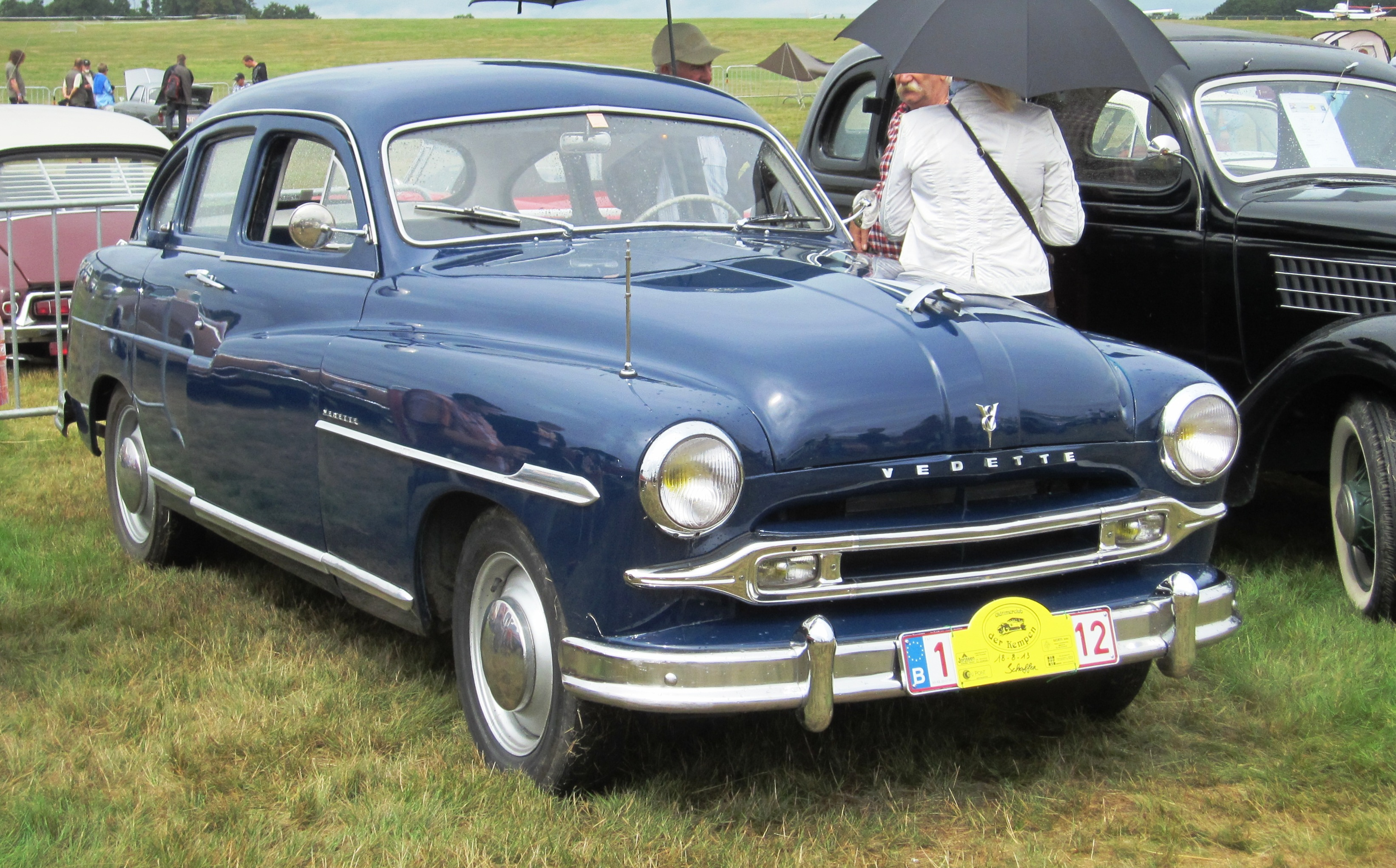
Post-1954 Ford Vedette sedan.

Under the direction of the new company president, François Lehideux, Ford France refreshed the car for 1950, and again in 1952, when it finally received a one-piece windscreen, new interior and bumpers, better brakes, lengthened rear overhang and trunk, and a cigarette lighter. The 1953 October Mondial de l’Automobile also saw a luxury version of the Vedette, the Ford Vendôme, fitted with the bigger 3923 cc Mistral V8 engine, previously used in Ford France trucks.

Also updated in 1953 was the five-door, five-seat Abeille (French for "bee") estate with a two-piece tailgate, advertised as both practical (with a payload of 500 kg (1,100 lb)) and comfortable. The Abeille, originally exhibited with little fanfare at the October 1951 Motor Show as a "farmer's car" (voiture agricole) and launched more formally as the "Ford Abeille" in June 1952, was a "no frills" development of the Vedette with which it shared its wheel base and engine, but the rear overhang and therefore the overall length were shorter by 220 mm (8.7 in) The interior surfaces of the Abeille were almost without exception of painted metal, and the front bench seat of the Vedette was replaced with two "rustic" seats apparently taken from a commercial van, but behind them the rear bench was easy to remove, allowing for the installation of a flat "false-floor" of timber planks, and facilitating the use of the car as a load carrier for farmers and small-scale traders. At the October 1953 Motor Show the standard Abeille was listed at 845,000 francs as against 935,000 francs for the least expensive version of the Vedette.

== Sale of the Poissy factory ==
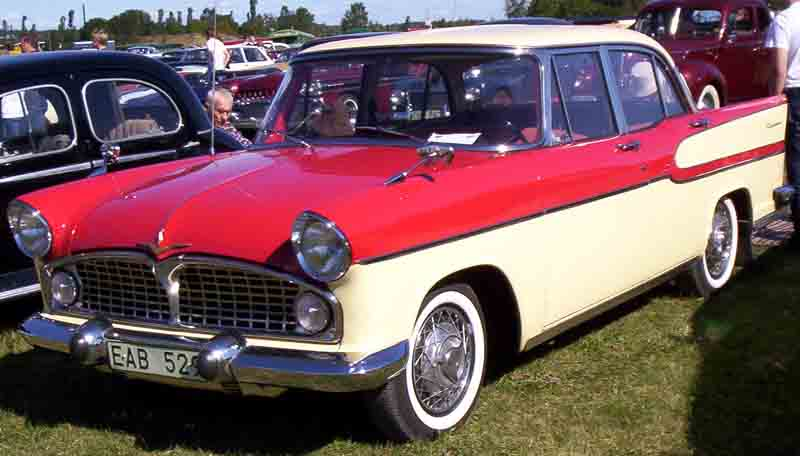
Ford Vedette ABXC Chambord (1958) in Sweden. The car debuted as the Simca Vedette in 1954 in France and Belgium, but in some export markets where the Simca brand had little history, it was badged as a Ford, despite the French business having been sold by Ford to Simca in 1954.

Facing unsatisfactory sales results, as well as disruptive strikes at the Poissy plant at the turn of the decade, Ford had been trying to dispose of the factory since shortly after the end of the war. An opportunity arose in 1954, when Henri-Theodore Pigozzi, the founder of the increasingly successful French automaker Simca, was looking for a new plant to expand its operations. Ford France was merged into Simca with both the Poissy plant and the rights to all models manufactured there — including a newly designed Vedette. The new car had debuted in France under the name of Simca Vedette, but was sold as the Ford Vedette in some markets (including Sweden, the Netherlands and Germany) at least until 1956.
