= Hôtel de Ville, Poissy =

Town hall in Poissy, France

Hôtel de Ville
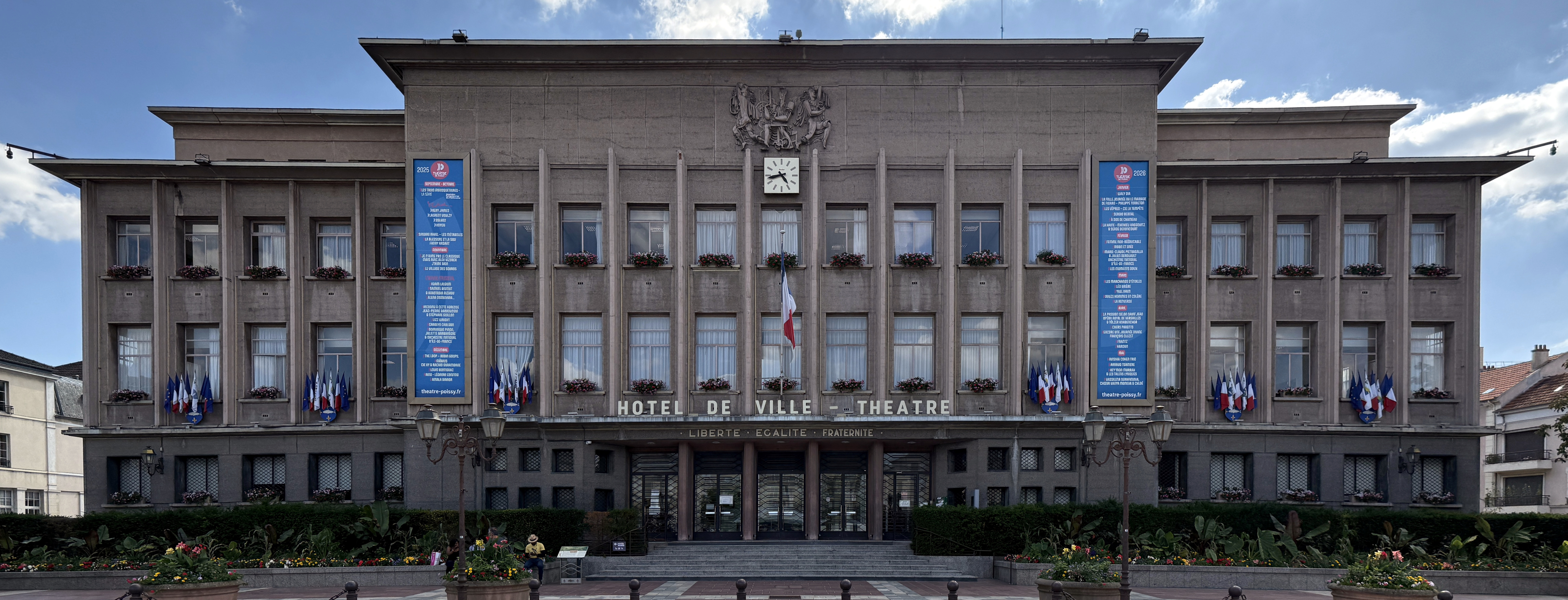
- The main frontage of the Hôtel de Ville in July 2025

General information
- Type: City hall
- Architectural style: Art Deco style
- Location: Poissy, France
- Coordinates: 48.9274°N 2.0427°E
- Completed: 1937

Design and construction
- Architects: Pierre Mathé and Henri Calsat

Monument historique
- Official name: Hôtel de ville
- Type: Inscrit
- Designated: 1996
- Reference no.: PA78000002

The Hôtel de Ville (French pronunciation: [otɛl də vil], City Hall) is a municipal building in Poissy, Yvelines, to the northwest of Paris, standing on Place de la République. It was designated a monument historique by the French government in 1996.

== History ==
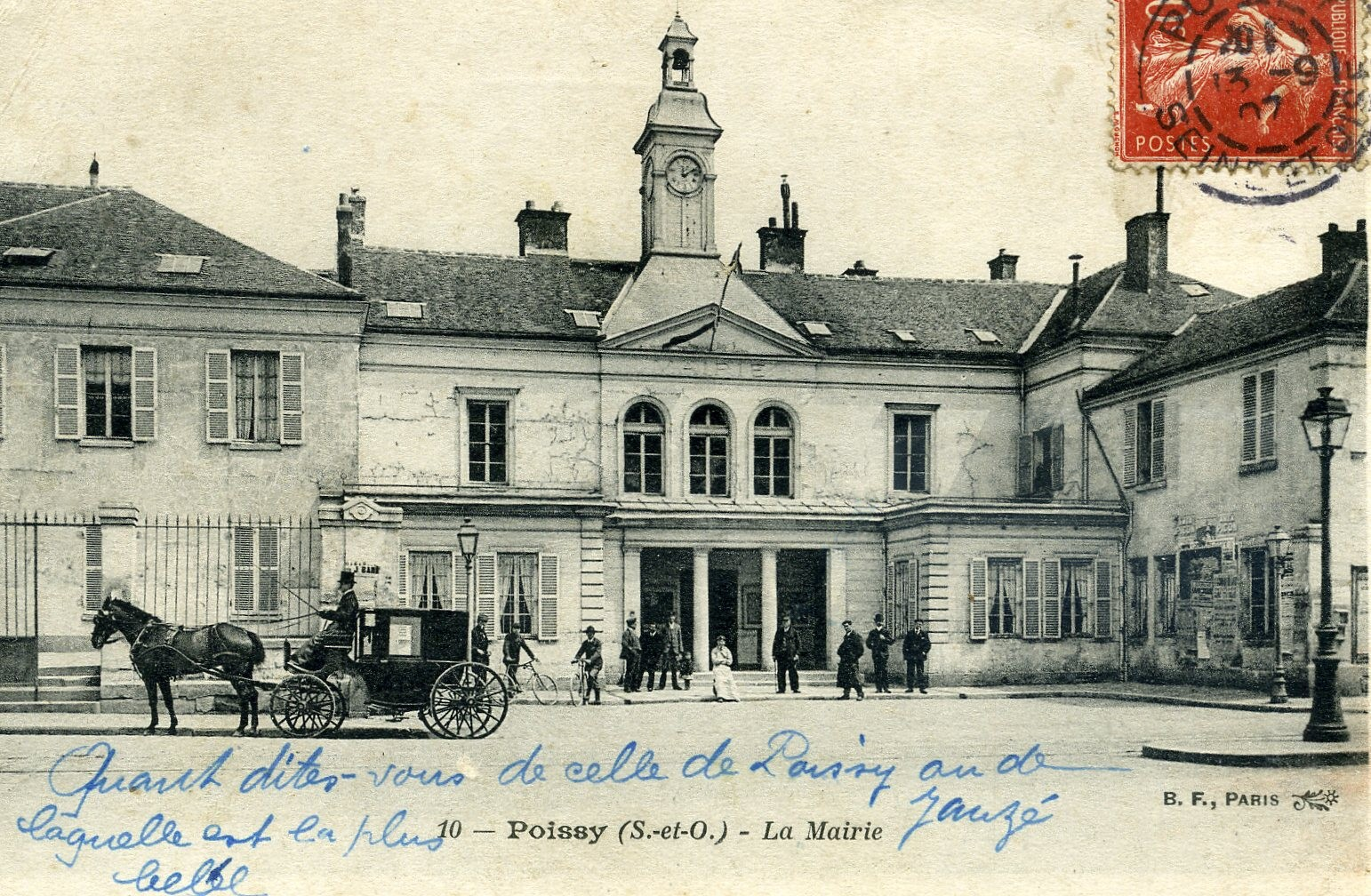
The old town hall

Following the French Revolution, the town council initially met at the home of the mayor at the time. This arrangement continued until 1810, when the council moved to a house opposite the local prison, Maison Centrale, and converted it into a town hall.

In the mid-1830s, after the first town hall was annexed by the French Army for the barracks used by an infantry company guarding Maison Centrale, the council needed to identify a new town hall. The building they selected was the former Couvent des Capucins (Convent of the Capuchins) on Rue de la Gare. The convent was established by Father Constance de Paris in 1620, and a chapel was erected there and then rebuilt in 1765. After the convent was confiscated by the state as biens nationaux (for the good of the state) in 1791, the friars were driven out and it was then used as a local events venue. It was acquired by the town council in 1837, and works were carried out, to a design by Sieur Didier, to convert it into a combined school and municipal office.

The design involved a symmetrical main frontage of five bays facing onto the street. The central section of three bays, which was slightly projected forward, featured an arcade formed by four columns supporting an entablature. There were three round headed windows on the first floor and, at roof level, there was a small pediment with a square clock tower surmounted by a belfry behind. The outer bays contained single storey pavilions on the ground floor and there were casement windows with cornices on the first floor.

In the 1930s, after the old town hall became cramped, the council led by the mayor, René Tainon, decided to commission a more substantial town hall together with a theatre attached. The site they selected was on Place à l'Herbe, which had previously been used as a cattle market. The initial design work was carried out by Florent Nanquette, although he was replaced before work started. The new building was designed by Pierre Mathé and Henri Calsat in the Art Deco style, built in concrete and glass and was officially opened on 12 December 1937.

The design involved a symmetrical main frontage of 19 bays facing onto Place de la République. The central section of nine bays, which was projected forward, contained five openings, separated by columns and containing glass doors. The first and second floors were fenestrated by casement windows and there was a tall parapet, decorated with a clock and a carving sculpted by Ossip Zadkine above. The carving depicted a worker, flanked by a woman carrying a violin and another woman carrying a theatre mask. The wings, of five bays each, were fenestrated in a similar style but had no parapets. Internally, the principal rooms were the Salle des Fêtes (ballroom), which was decorated by Armand Aristide, and the Salle des Mariages (wedding room), which featured a painting by Jean-Robert Pinet. The painting by Pinet depicted the arrival of the 15th century court writer, Christine de Pizan, in Poissy.

During the Second World War, German troops arrested eight members of French Forces of the Interior (FFI) in Poissy on 21 August 1944: they then surrounded the town hall, shot one of the FFI members in front of the town hall, and executed another five of them that evening. The town was eventually liberated by American troops, after extensive fighting, on 29 August 1944.

A mural by the Latvian artist, Theodore Brenson, which depicted the transition between the imaginary world of the theatre and the real world outside, and had been installed in the town hall foyer, was restored in 2016.
