= Centre hospitalier intercommunal de Poissy-Saint-Germain-en-Laye =

Coordinates: 48.8981179°N 2.0844941°E

Geography
- Location: Poissy, Saint Germain en Laye, Île-de-France, France

Organisation
- Care system: Public
- Type: Teaching

Services
- Emergency department: Yes
- Beds: 1209

History
- Opened: 1997

Links
- Website: http://www.chi-poissy-st-germain.fr/
- Lists: Hospitals in France

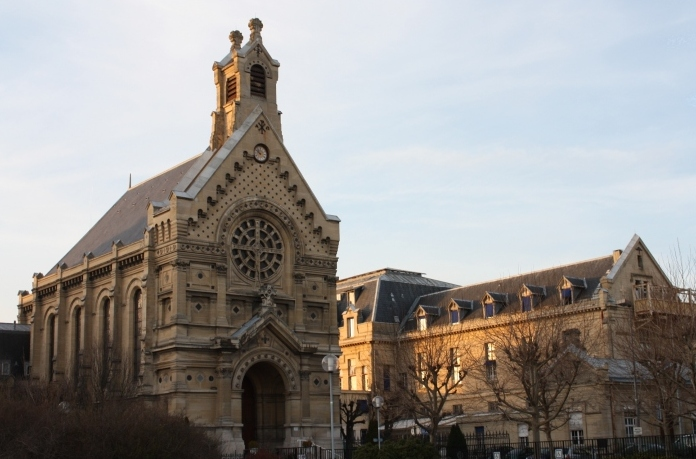
Centre hospitalier intercommunal de Poissy-Saint-Germain-en-Laye

The Centre hospitalier intercommunal de Poissy-Saint-Germain-en-Laye (CHIPS) is a hospital in Poissy and Saint Germain en Laye. As with all intercommunal hospitals in Île-de-France, it is independent of Assistance Publique – Hôpitaux de Paris. CHIPS is a teaching hospital of Versailles Saint-Quentin-en-Yvelines University.

== History ==
The Saint-Louis de Saint-Germain-en-Laye hospital has its roots in a poorhouse founded in 1228. In 1619, entrusted to the order of the Franciscan Recollects, it became a hôtel-Dieu, which later disappeared. It was replaced by a charity house in 1649, and replaced again by the Hôtel-Dieu de la Charité from 1670 onwards. The Marquise of Montespan founded a general hospital (also comprising an apothecary) for the confinement of beggars from the city, which became a hospice for the elderly in 1753. The two establishments combined in 1803 and a new building was inaugurated in 1881. It became a central public hospital in 1956, and the sisters of the charity left the following year.

In turn, Poissy hospital succeeds a poorhouse founded by Louis IX and run by sisters (Saint-Thomas de Villeneuve until 1735, then sisters of the charity) alongside the collegiate. A new hospital was inaugurated in 1856 that served as a hospice and was replaced in 1960s by the current hospital, situated on the plateau de Beauregard. The Saint-Louis hospice was closed in 1992.

In the 2000s, a project was launched to consolidate two sites in the municipality of Chambourcy, notably supported by the deputy mayor Pierre Morange. It was subsequently abandonded due to financial issues, and the modernisation of the two sites was instead prioritised. The new project, less costly, would see the construction of a new building in Poissy; the Poissy site would be geared toward emergencies, surgery, long-term hospitalisation and maternity, whereas the Saint-Germain site would be for short-term hospitalisation, consultations, outpatient surgery, and would also comprise a cancer centre. The construction of the new building began in January 2018, and was fully opened to the public in December 2020.
