= Fabien Raddas =

French-Guadeloupean footballer (born 1980)

Personal information
- Full name: Fabien Raddas
- Date of birth: 7 March 1980 (age 46)
- Place of birth: Poissy, France
- Height: 1.83 m (6 ft 0 in)
- Positions: Striker; attacking midfielder

Senior career*
Years	Team	Apps	(Gls)
2001–2002	AS Poissy	29	(9)
2002–2003	FC Rouen	22	(4)
2003–2004	Stade Brestois	12	(1)
2004–2007	AS Poissy	82	(21)
2007–2008	Paris FC	34	(4)
2008–2010	Stade Lavallois	61	(7)
2010–2011	AS Cannes	33	(2)
2011–2012	AS Beauvais	17	(0)
2012–2013	Mantes 78	26	(8)
2013–2015	Chambly	44	(7)
2015–2020	Poissy	140	(22)

International career
2007	Guadeloupe	10	(2)
- * Club domestic league appearances and goals as of 1 January 2021

Fabien Raddas (born 7 March 1980) is a French professional football player.

Born in Poissy, Raddas played basketball and football as a youth. He choose to pursue football with local side AS Poissy. Raddas spent most of his career in the lower-levels of French club football. He helped two clubs achieve promotion to Ligue 2 (FC Rouen and Stade Brestois 29), but he would only spend a single season playing at that level with Stade Lavallois.

He played for Guadeloupe national football team.

== Biography ==
In June 2013, he signed with FC Chambly Oise in the CFA and was promoted to the National division at the end of the season. He played for that same club for one year in the National division before returning in 2015 to the club where he began his career, AS Poissy. At the same time, he plays for AS Banque de France in corporate soccer.

Since June 2022, he has been a member of the Variétés Club de France, for which he has scored a total of seven goals.
