= Romarin Billong =

Cameroonian footballer (born 1970)

Personal information
- Full name: Aimé-Romarin Billong
- Date of birth: June 11, 1970 (age 56)
- Place of birth: Moundou, Chad
- Height: 1.78 m (5 ft 10 in)
- Position: Defender

Senior career*
Years	Team	Apps	(Gls)
1989–1995	Lyon	108	(5)
1995–1999	Saint-Étienne	96	(4)
1999–2000	West Ham United	0	(0)
2000–2002	Nancy	47	(3)
Total		251	(12)

International career
1997–1998	Cameroon	13	(0)
- * Club domestic league appearances and goals

Aimé-Romarin Billong (born June 11, 1970) is a Cameroonian former professional footballer who played as a defender. His brother Silas is also a former footballer.

Born in Moundou, Chad, Billong played for the Cameroon national team and a few clubs in France. In October 1999 he signed for Premier League side West Ham United to play under Harry Redknapp. However, he never made a first team appearance for the club.

He was a participant at the 1998 African Cup of Nations, playing in the group match against Burkina Faso and the quarterfinal against Congo DR. Billong also represented Cameroon during 1998 World Cup qualifiers, but he was not included in the 22-man squad for the final tournament in France.

He holds both Cameroonian and French nationalities.
