= AS Poissy =

French football club

- Full name: Amicale Sportive de Poissy
- Nickname(s): ASP; Les pisciacais Les jaune et bleu Les poissons Poissy
- Founded: 1904; 121 years ago
- Dissolved: 2023
- Ground: Stade Léo Lagrange; Poissy
- Capacity: 3,500
- Chairman: Olivier Szewezuck
- Manager: Laurent Fournier
- 2022–23: National 2 Group A, 6th of 16 (relegated)
- Website: https://www.aspoissyfoot.com
Home colours	Away colours	Third colours

AS Poissy (French: Amicale Sportive de Poissy) was a French football club based in Poissy (Yvelines). It was founded in 1904, and liquidated in 2023. They played at the Stade Léo Lagrange, which has a capacity of 3,500. The colours of the club were yellow and blue. AS Poissy played one season in Ligue 2, in 1977–78.

The AS Poissy training centre received the "Jeunes Excellence" Label in 2015, among 192 French clubs, and in 2016 the "Jeunes Élite" Label awarded by the French Football Federation. This quality label was awarded to only 76 French clubs.

Young and senior teams played the highest regional and national levels for many years. Many professional players played for the club like M'Baye Niang, Gérard Soler, Fabien Raddas or Diallo Guidileye.

== Honours ==
- Championnat National: 1977
- Division d'Honneur: 1971, 1982
- Coupe de la Ligue de Paris: 1948, 1953, 1971, 1988, 2007

== History ==
The club was founded in the year 1904 in Poissy. In 1968 the club merged with the AS Simca, keeping the AS Poissy name. The club reached the round of 16 of the Coupe de France in 1972.

The club gained promotion to the second tier of French football in 1977, remaining just one season. From 2015 to 2023 the club played in the fourth tier. In the summer of 2023 the club were administratively relegated to Régional 1 by the DNCG for financial reasons.

On 4 August 2023, the Court of Versailles order the liquidation by law of AS Poissy. A new club will be formed in Yvelines, named Poissy FC, which will not be allowed to enter competition above the level of Régional 3 (the eighth tier of French football).

== Stadium ==
=== Léo Lagrange's Stadium ===
The Léo Lagrange's Stadium is the first training center of AS Poissy Football. It is located at the exit of Poissy and contains two football fields, the Roger Quenolle Flame of Honour (3,500 places) hosting the games of the Senior's first team, and the Salif Gagigo Synthetic Field hosting the games and training of the training center (U15-U17-U19).

=== Cosec Stadium ===
The du cosec's stadium is the second training center of the AS Poissy Football. It is located at the entrance of Poissy and contains two synthetic football fields hosting the games and training of the pre-training center (U7 to U13), a natural lawn pitch where take place the training of the senior's first team, and a dirt field hosting various sporting events.

=== Terrasses de Poncy's Stadium ===
The Terrasses de Poncy in Poissy will host for the 2019–2020 season the male training and pre-training center of the football and handball teams of the Paris Saint-Germain Football Club. The centre will include a useful surface area of 74 hectares, 14 football fields and a 5,000 seats stadium that will accommodate, among other things, the PSG seniors reserve team.

== Identity ==
Pisciaceans play with a yellow jersey, blue shorts, and blue socks at home. While outside they play with a white set. The suppliers of the club was Nike, Marcron and since 2017 Jako. AS Poissy has many supporters and is a rival of Paris Saint Germain F.C., FC Mantois 78 and Athletic Club de Boulogne-Billancourt in the same League.

== Current squad ==
As of 17 April 2022

Note: Flags indicate national team as defined under FIFA eligibility rules; some limited exceptions apply. Players may hold more than one non-FIFA nationality.

No.	Pos.	Nation	Player
—	DF	(France) FRA	Wilfried Alledji
—	MF	(Ukraine) UKR	Roman Yalovenko
—	GK		Emma Carey

No.	Pos.	Nation	Player
—	MF	(France) FRA	Amadou Konaté

== Former coaches ==
- Roger Quenolle (1969–1983)
- Alain Laurier (1983–1986)
- Robert Buigues (1986–1987)
- Pascal Gressani (1988)
- Patrick Grappin (1989–1993)
- Camille Choquier (1990–1992)
- Thierry Bocquet (1992–1996)
- Patrice Ferri (1996–1999)
- Éric Dewilder (1999–2002)
- Patrice Ferri (2002–2004)
- Azzedine Meguellatti (2004–2006)
- Dominique Gomis (2006–2012)
- Thierry Bocquet (2012–2015)
- Nordine Kourichi (2015–2016)
- Kader Chehida (2016–2017)
- Laurent Hatton (2017–2019)
- Laurent Fournier (2019- )
