= Patrice Ferri =

French footballer (born 1963)

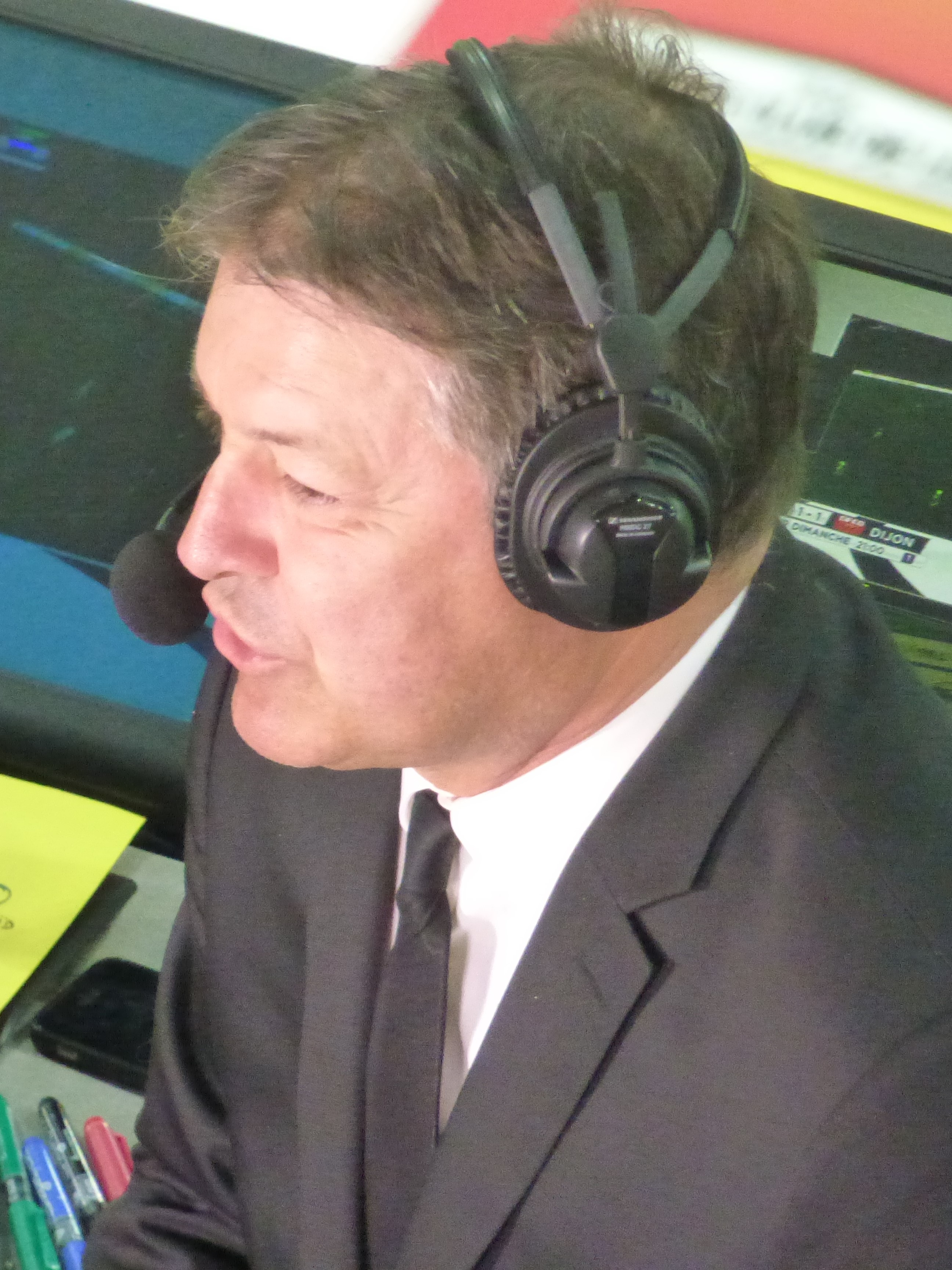

Personal information
- Date of birth: 19 July 1963 (age 63)
- Place of birth: Lyon, France
- Height: 5 ft 10 in (1.78 m)
- Position: Defender

Youth career
- 1981–1982: AS Saint-Étienne

Senior career*
Years	Team	Apps	(Gls)
1982–1988	AS Saint-Étienne	137	(10)
1988	RC Strasbourg	14	(1)
1988–1991	AS Cannes	74	(3)
1991–1992	Sporting Toulon Var	21	(0)
1992–1993	Olympique Lyonnais	15	(0)
1993–1995	Montreal Impact	39	(2)
1995–1996	AS Saint-Étienne	0	(0)
1996–1997	AS Poissy		
- * Club domestic league appearances and goals

Patrice Ferri is a retired French association football defender who played professionally in France and Canada.

In 1981, Ferri, then seventeen, signed an apprentice contract with AS Saint-Étienne. During the 1982-1983 season, he moved to the first team. In November 1988, Ferri briefly played for RC Strasbourg before moving to AS Cannes. In 1991, he transferred to Sporting Toulon Var for one season before spending the 1992-1993 season with Olympique Lyonnais. In 1993, Ferri moved to Canada and joined the Montreal Impact of the American Professional Soccer League. In 1993, he was selected as First Team All-League. In 1995, Ferri moved back to France, where he joined Saint-Étienne for one season. He finished his career with AS Poissy.
