= Poissy =

Commune of France

- Commune
- Coat of arms

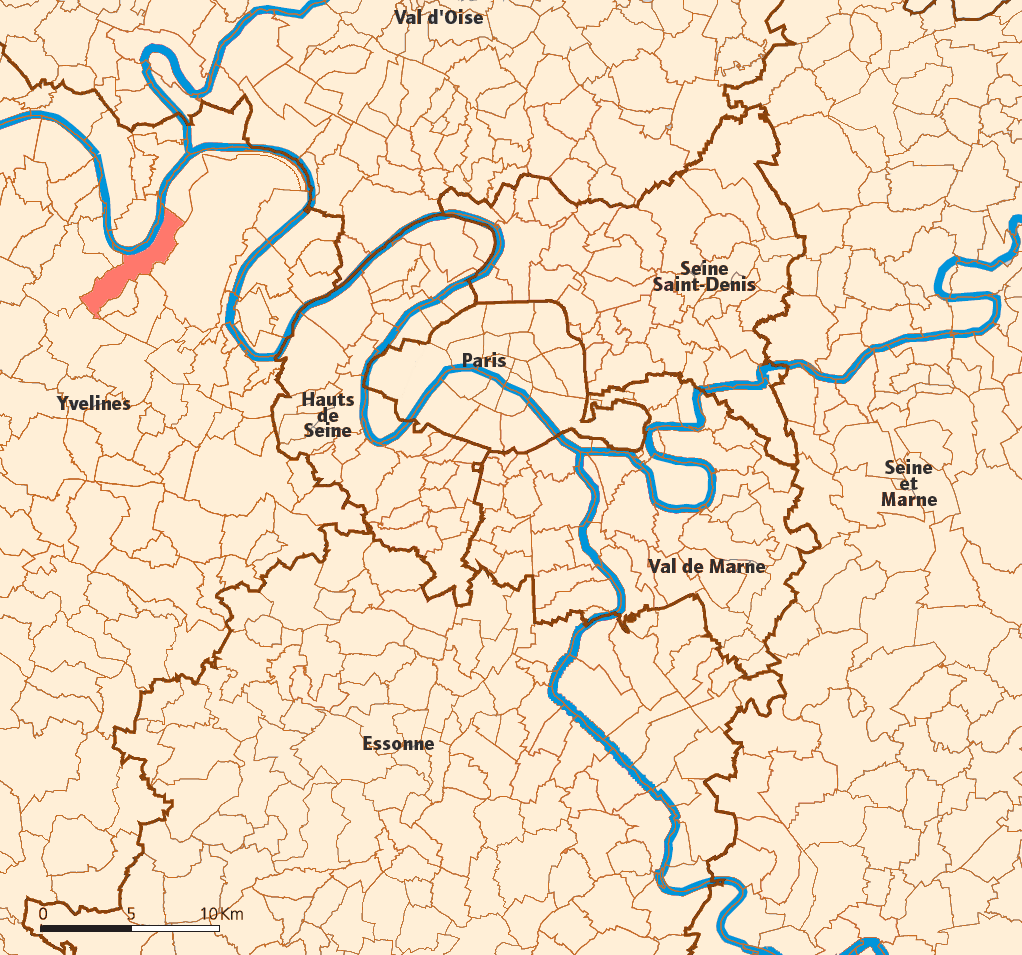
- Location (in red) within Paris inner and outer suburbs
- Location of Poissy
- Location within France Location within Île-de-France (region)
- Coordinates: 48°55′46″N 2°02′44″E
- Country: France
- Region: Île-de-France
- Department: Yvelines
- Arrondissement: Saint-Germain-en-Laye
- Canton: Poissy
- Intercommunality: CU Grand Paris Seine et Oise

Government
  - Mayor (2022–2026): Sandrine Berno Dos Santos
- Area^{1}: 13.28 km^{2} (5.13 sq mi)
- Elevation: 27 m (89 ft)
- Highest elevation: 171 m (561 ft)
- Lowest elevation: 17 m (56 ft)
- Population (2023): 40,983
  - Density: 3,086/km^{2} (7,993/sq mi)
- Demonym(s): Pisciacais (masculine); Pisciacaise (feminine)
- Time zone: UTC+01:00 (CET)
  - Summer (DST): UTC+02:00 (CEST)
- INSEE/Postal code: 78498 /78300
- ^{1} French Land Register data, which excludes lakes, ponds, glaciers > 1 km^{2} (0.386 sq mi or 247 acres) and river estuaries.

Poissy (French: [pwasi]) is a commune in the Yvelines department in the Île-de-France region in north-central France. It is located in the western suburbs of Paris, 23.8 km (14.8 mi) from the centre of Paris. Inhabitants are called Pisciacais in French. With about 41,000 inhabitants, Poissy is the 5th most populated commune in Yvelines.

Poissy is one of the oldest royal cities of Île-de-France, birthplace of Louis IX of France and Philip III of France, before being supplanted from the 15th century by Saint-Germain-en-Laye. In 1561, it was the site of a fruitless Catholic–Huguenot conference, the Colloquy of Poissy.

The area was known for the early car maker Automobiles Gregoire, and since then a number of companies including Simca and Peugeot, have produced vehicles at the Poissy Plant. From 1961 until 1991 the Simca Poissy engine was made there.

== Location ==
Poissy is located about 30 kilometres west of Paris, in the north-eastern part of the Yvelines, 8 kilometres west of Saint-Germain-en-Laye, and 23 kilometres north-west of Versailles, the departmental prefecture.

The city is limited to the east by the forest of Saint-Germain-en-Laye and to the west by the Seine.

== History ==
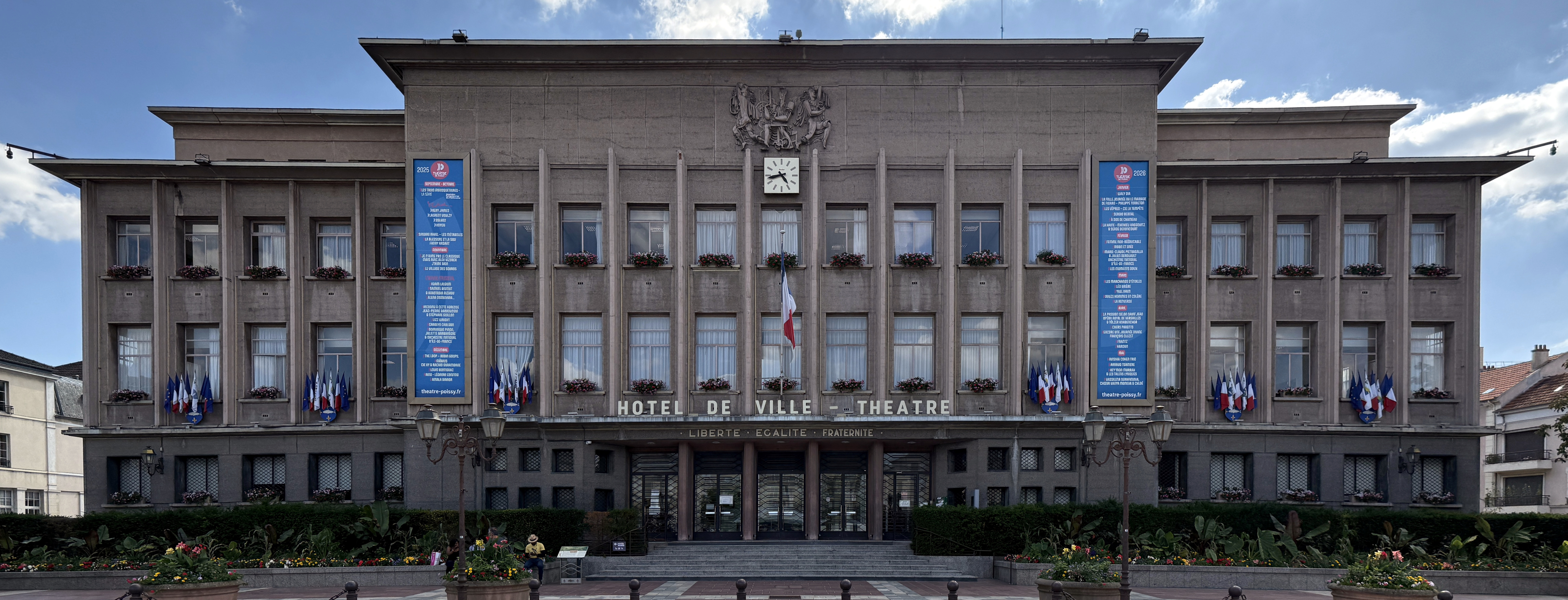
The Hôtel de Ville

The Hôtel de Ville was completed in 1937.

== Demographics ==
Historical population

Year	Pop.	±% p.a.
1793	2,807	—
1800	2,437	−2.00%
1806	2,500	+0.43%
1821	2,643	+0.37%
1831	2,850	+0.76%
1836	2,880	+0.21%
1841	3,925	+6.39%
1846	4,261	+1.66%
1851	4,300	+0.18%
1856	4,951	+2.86%
1861	5,101	+0.60%
1866	4,973	−0.51%
1872	5,047	+0.25%
1876	5,063	+0.08%
1881	5,600	+2.04%
1886	6,403	+2.72%
1891	6,432	+0.09%
1896	6,981	+1.65%
1901	7,406	+1.19%

Year	Pop.	±% p.a.
1906	7,959	+1.45%
1911	8,709	+1.82%
1921	10,135	+1.53%
1926	11,298	+2.20%
1931	12,386	+1.86%
1936	12,502	+0.19%
1946	13,375	+0.68%
1954	15,046	+1.48%
1962	28,548	+8.34%
1968	33,613	+2.76%
1975	37,497	+1.57%
1982	36,389	−0.43%
1990	36,745	+0.12%
1999	35,841	−0.28%
2007	37,109	+0.44%
2012	37,597	+0.26%
2017	37,388	−0.11%
2023	40,983	+1.54%

Source: EHESS and INSEE (1968–2023)

== Transport ==
Poissy is served by Poissy station on Paris RER line A and on the Transilien Paris-Saint-Lazare suburban rail line.

== Economy ==
=== Main companies ===
- Automobile:
  - Stellantis France
  - Wagon Automotive (équipementier automobile)
  - Mahle Aftermarket
  - Faurecia
  - Siemens VDO Automotive
- Rochas (Procter & Gamble) now Fareva
- Environnement SA
- Transport and logistics:
  - GEFCO (until 2014
  - Elidis
  - KDI Promet
  - Trapil
- Wattelez
- Casino cafétéria
- Groupe Derichebourg,

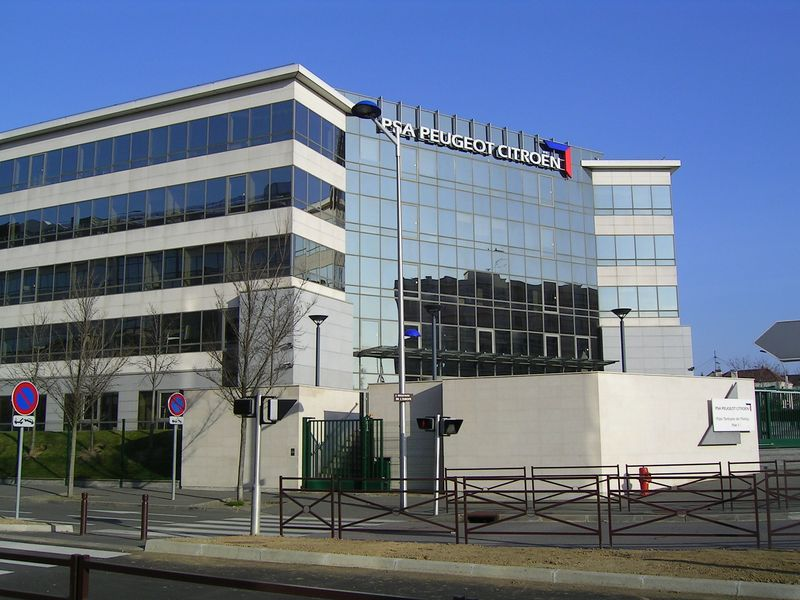
PSA Peugeot-Citroën

=== Technoparc ===
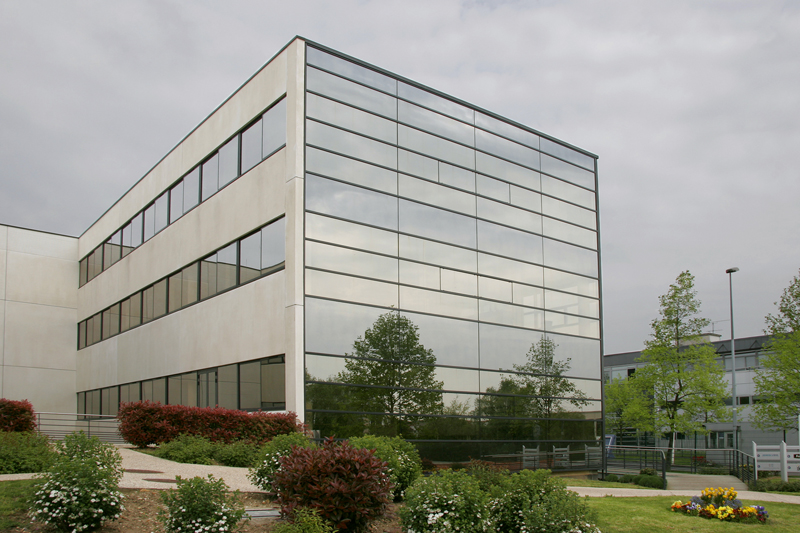
Technoparc

Technoparc is a Business Park created in 1990, with the intention to facilitate the economic diversification of the city. It occupies about 66 acres on the northeast of Stellantis plant, bordering the neighbouring commune Achères. The Park welcomes 150 companies employing a total of 2,000 employees. It also hosts The Charles-de-Gaulle High School and The Training Centre for the Employees in Pharmacy (ACPPAV) gathering 1,500 high school students and students. Two business incubator, a heliport, the Chamber of Commerce of Yvelines-Val d'Oise, two hotels, a sports centre and a municipal technical centre are also located there. Since 2024, the house and set of the reality competition Secret Story are located in the Technoparc.

== Highlights ==
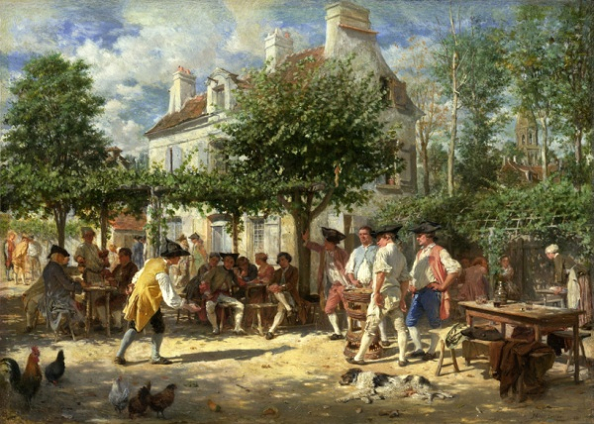
Dimanche à Poissy by Meissonier, 1851

- Villa Savoye, considered by many to be the seminal work of the Swiss architect Le Corbusier.
- The "Noyau de Poissy" is a liquor based on macerated or distilled apricot pits, a local tradition since early 18th century.

== Culture ==
=== Museums ===
- Musée du jouet, shows 800 games and toys dating between 1850 and 1950.
- Musée d'art et d'histoire.

=== Cultural facilities ===
- La salle Molière (theater);
- Cinema;
- Library Christine de Pizan;
- Library André-Malraux.

=== Poissy in film ===
- La Porteuse de pain (1963);
- La Demoiselle d'Avignon (1972);
- La Tribu (1990)
- Les Grands Ducs (1996);
- Le Ciel, les oiseaux et... ta mère ! (1998);
- Le Cerveau;
- From Paris with Love (2009);
- Turk's Head (2010);
- Serial Teachers (2013);
- Le Mystère des jonquilles (2014);
- French Blood (2015);
- Dheepan (2015);

== Education ==
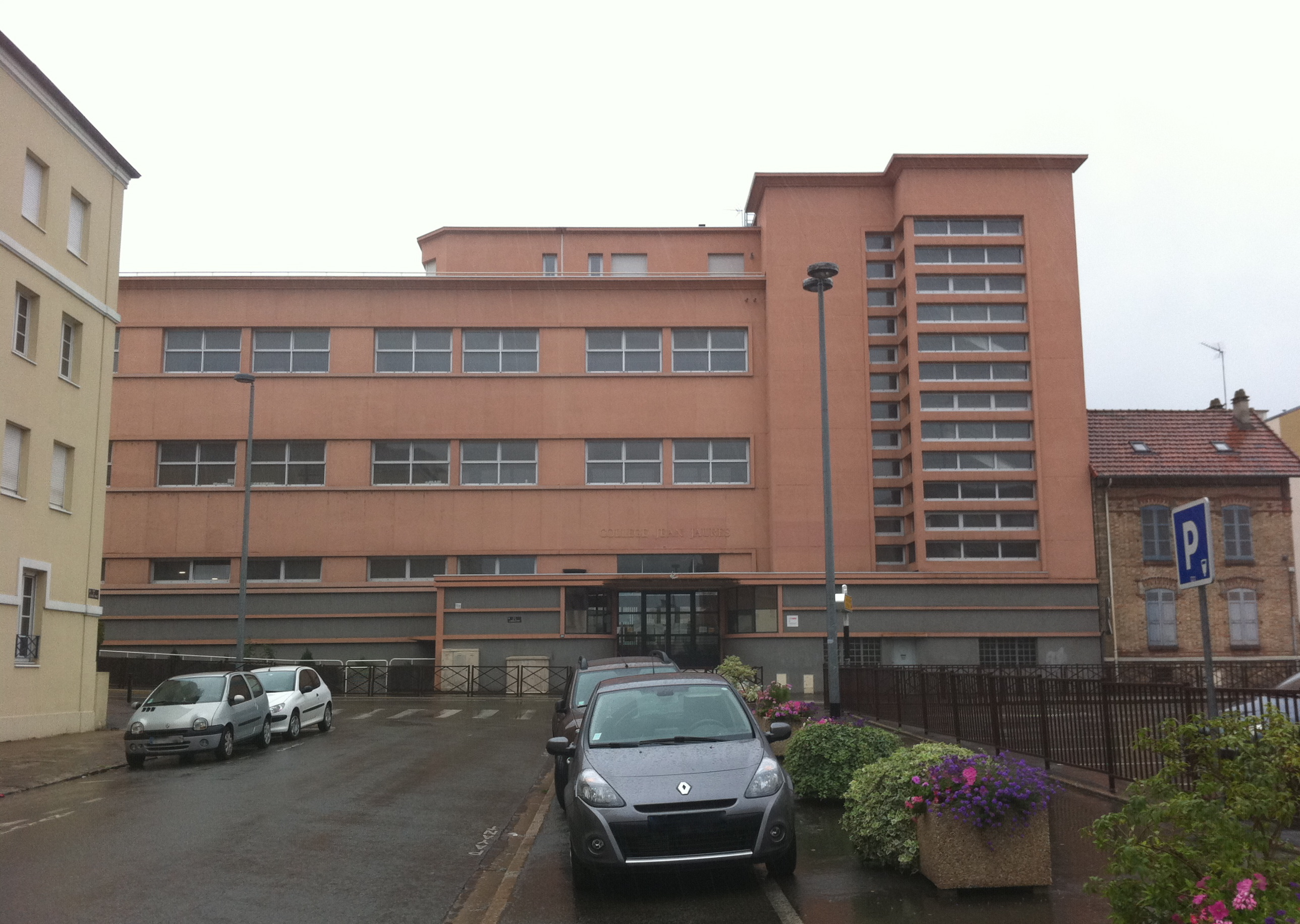
Collège Jean Jaurès

Poissy has ten public preschools, ten public elementary schools, two junior high schools, two senior high schools, a combined junior-senior high school, along with a private preschool and elementary school.

Public secondary schools:

- Collège les Grands-Champs
  - SEGPA les Grands-Champs
- Collège Jean Jaurès
- Lycée Adrienne Bolland
- Lycée Charles de Gaulle
- Collège et Lycée Le Corbusier

Private elementary schools:

- Institution Notre-Dame preschool and elementary school

== Hospital ==
- Centre hospitalier intercommunal de Poissy-Saint-Germain-en-Laye

== International Relation ==
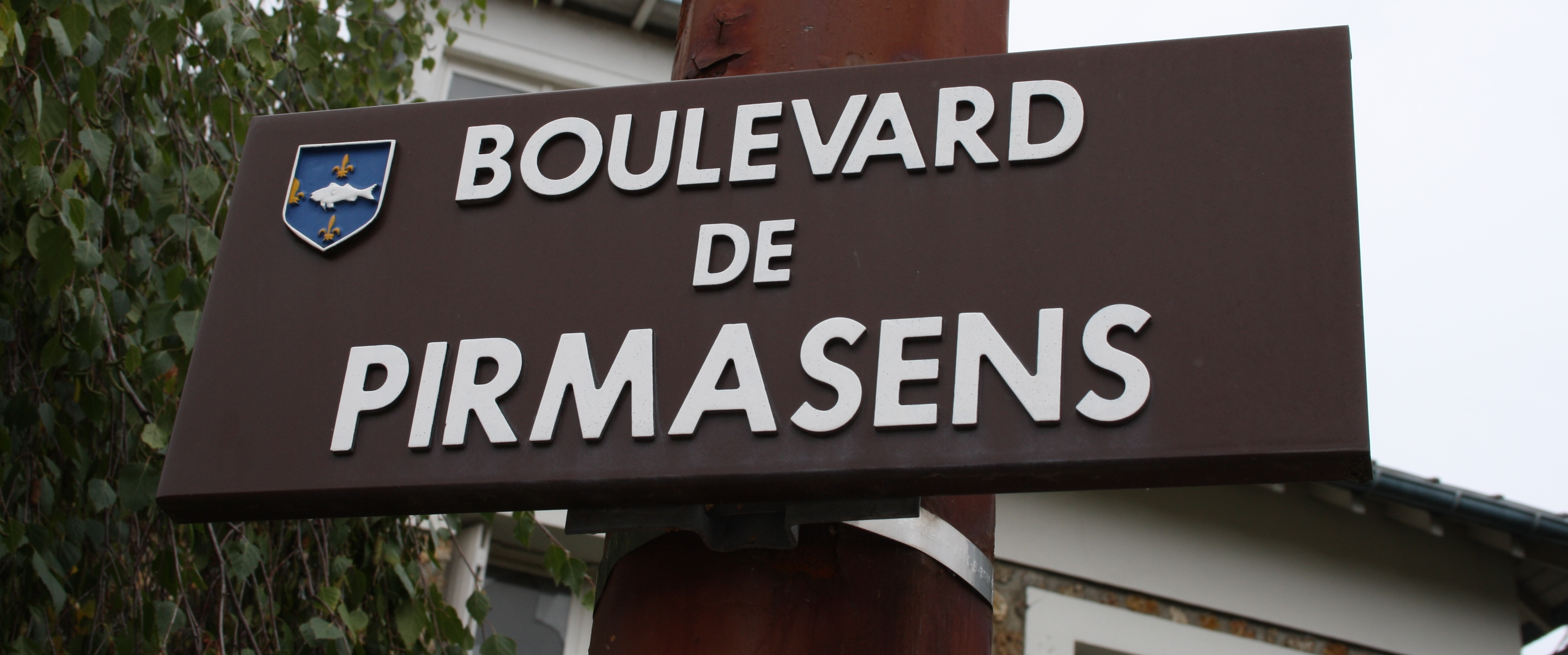
Boulevard de Pirmasens in Poissy

Poissy is twinned with:

- Pirmasens, Rhineland-Palatinate, Germany, since 1964

== People ==
- Saint Louis (1214–1270), king of France
- Ibrahim Diaw, handball player
- Florent Groberg, U.S. Army Medal of Honor recipient
- Matteo Guendouzi footballer
- Christophe Jaffrelot, political scientist and indologist
- Houssine Kharja, Moroccan football player born in 1982
- Catherine Lara, singer born in 1945
- Guillaume Lasceux (1740–1831), composer and organist
- Olivier Lombard, racing driver
- Ali Marhyar (born 1984), actor, film director and screenwriter
- Jean-Louis-Ernest Meissonier (1815–1891), painter, sculptor and mayor of Poissy
- Alexandre Müller (born 1997), tennis player
- Benjamin Franklin resided in Poissy for a time while envoy to France during the American Revolutionary War
- Jérôme Phojo, footballer
- Fabien Raddas, footballer
- Yohann Sangare, basketball player
- Carla Leite, basketball player

== Sport ==
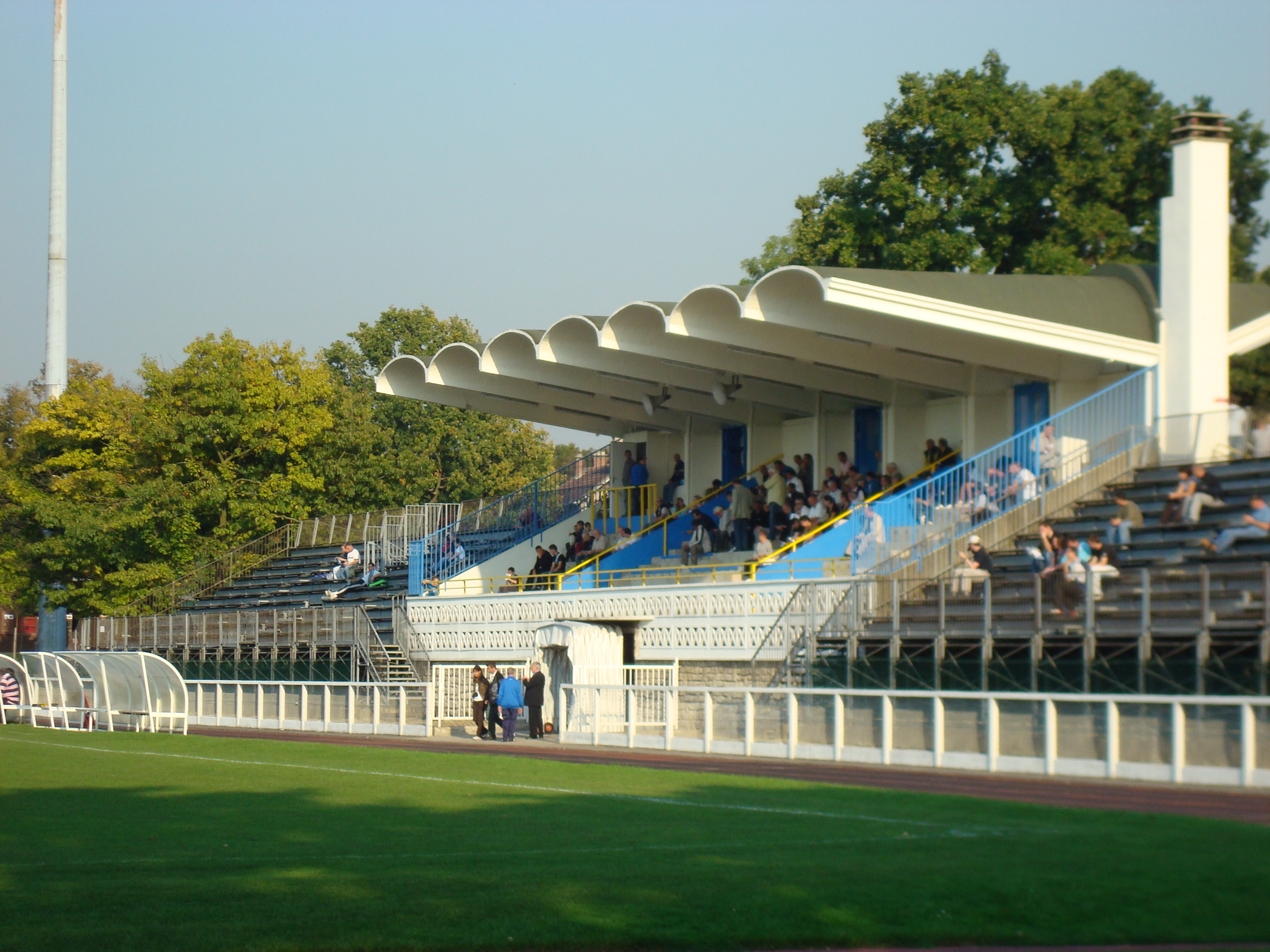
Stadium Léo-Lagrange

- Skatepark
- The golf of Béthemont
- Stadium Léo-Lagrange, built in 1945
- Swimming pool des Migneaux and swimming pool Saint-Exupéry
- AS Poissy

== See also ==
- Communes of the Yvelines department
