= Matford =

Defunct French car and truck manufacturer

- Type: Joint venture
- Industry: Automotive
- Founded: 1934
- Founder: Ford Motor Company; Mathis S.A.
- Defunct: 1940; 86 years ago
- Headquarters: Strasbourg, France
- Products: Automobiles, trucks
- Parent: Ford S.A. Française

Matford was a French automotive manufacturer established as a joint venture in 1934 by local firm Mathis and US-based Ford Motor Company. The name Matford derived from both companies' names. The company ceased activities in 1940.

== Overview ==
In the early 1930s, the Ford Motor Company was quickly expanding its European production, while Mathis S.A. had financial problems, but also a large, underutilized factory at Strasbourg (which, following frontier changes formalized in 1919, was now in France).

Ford were keen to increase production and the Mathis plant in Strasbourg seemed more suitable than their existing workshop in Asnières-sur-Seine. A joint venture between Ford and Mathis was created under the name of Matford S.A., formally created on 1 October 1934, and owned by Ford and Matthis in the proportion 60:40. The initial cars were locally assembled versions of contemporary American and British Ford models.

The intention had been expressed to produce the Matford models alongside those from Mathis but the last Mathis was actually made in October 1934, which was also the month in which Matford was formally founded. During 1935, under the energetic direction of Maurice Dollfus who had joined Ford in 1930, Ford poured massive amounts of capital into modernising the Strasbourg plant. There were high hopes for the Matford collaboration which, in 1934, was expected to last for fifty years.

In 1935 a range of V8-engined Matfords was put on the market which were very similar to the American Ford Model 48s with their V-8 3,622 cc (221 cu in) engines. A French version appeared in 1936 as the model that has come to be known as the Matford Alsace, with a choice of a 2,225 or 3,622 cc V8 engine: a cabriolet was also listed. The 1937 models were generally known at the time simply as the Matford 13CV and the Matford 21CV which followed the convention of the time by using the cars' fiscal horse power ratings as model names. Both featured a V-shaped windscreen and in 1938 a US style timber bodied estate car joined the range. The steel car bodies were purchased from the coachbuilders Chausson rather than being built inhouse.

Volume passenger car production ended in 1940 with the buildup of truck orders for the French army, though an unknown number were made during the German occupation, at least till 1942. Under the occupation, because of its proximity to the German border, the contents of the Matford Stasbourg factory were moved to Ford's Cologne plant, while a new Ford plant was opened at Poissy, near Paris, in 1940.

Ford's links with Mathis were severed. Ford's French business was restructured in 1940, now taking the name Ford Société Anonyme Française and this company used the Ford trademark. Émile Mathis, fearing persecution under German occupation, escaped to the United States where he spent the war, while Matford ceased to exist.

Matford cars achieved success at the Coupe de Dames (1936) and at Monte Carlo (1938).

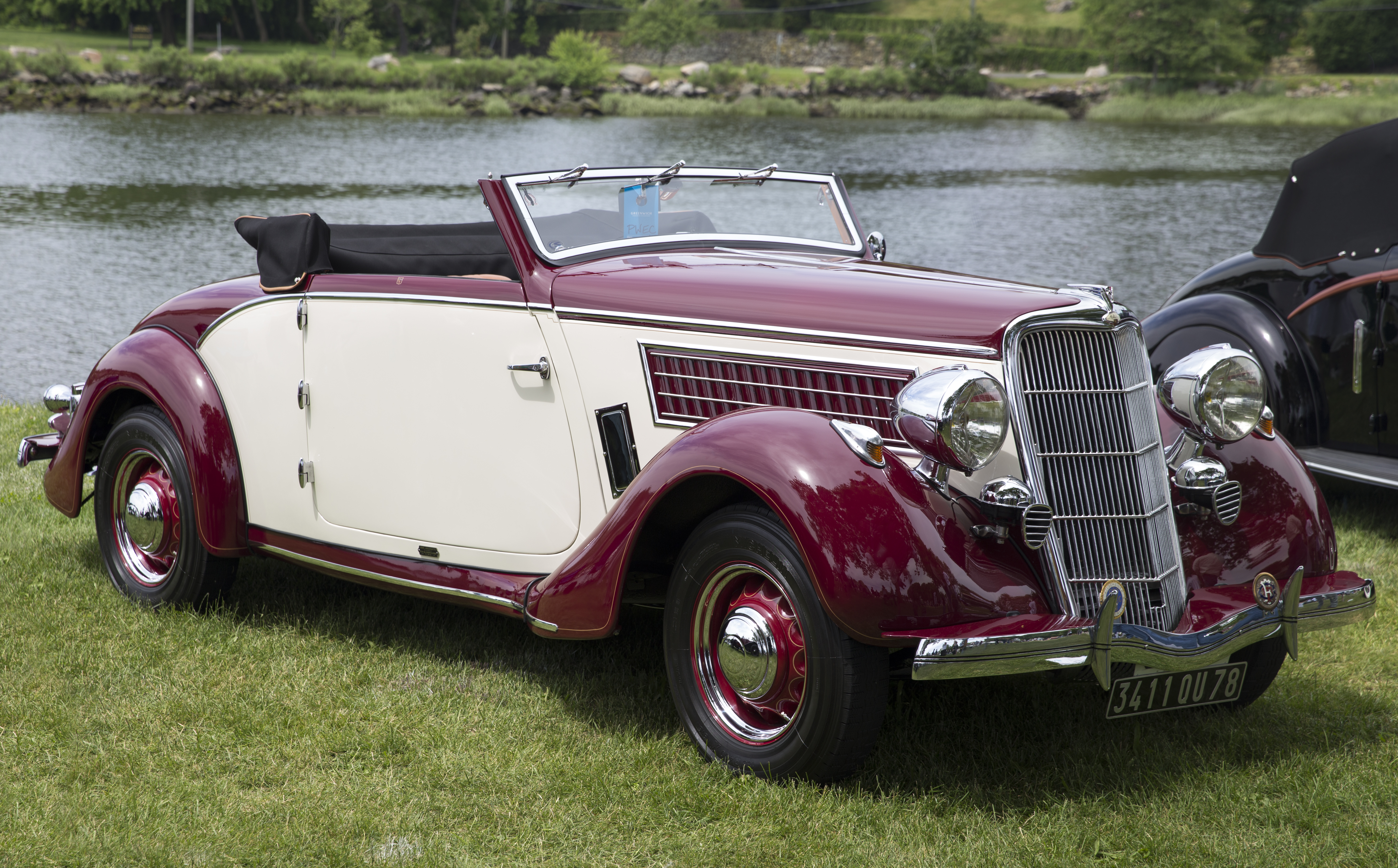
Matford V8-48 Roadster by Labourdette (1935)

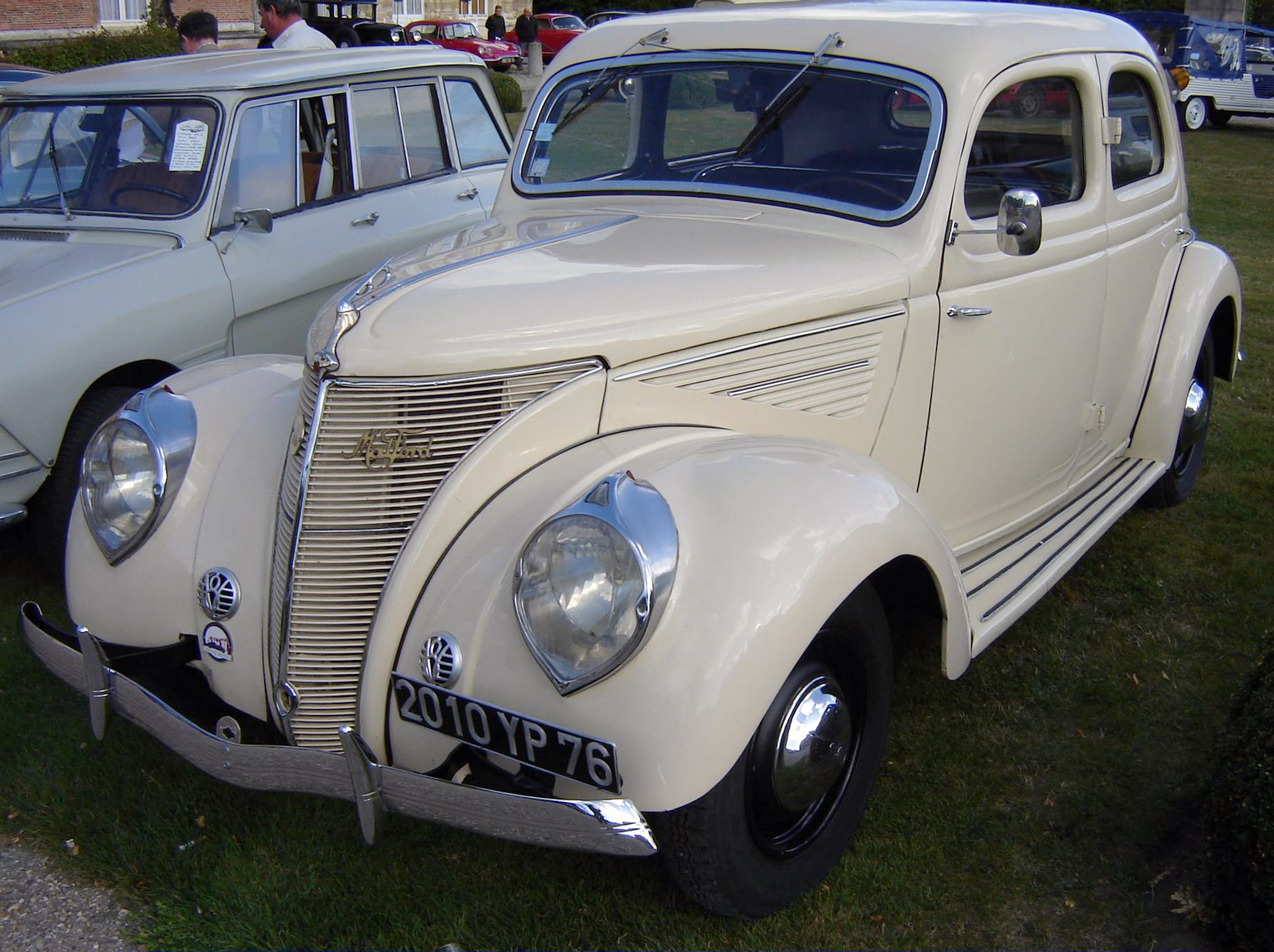
Matford Alsace V8 sedan (1936)

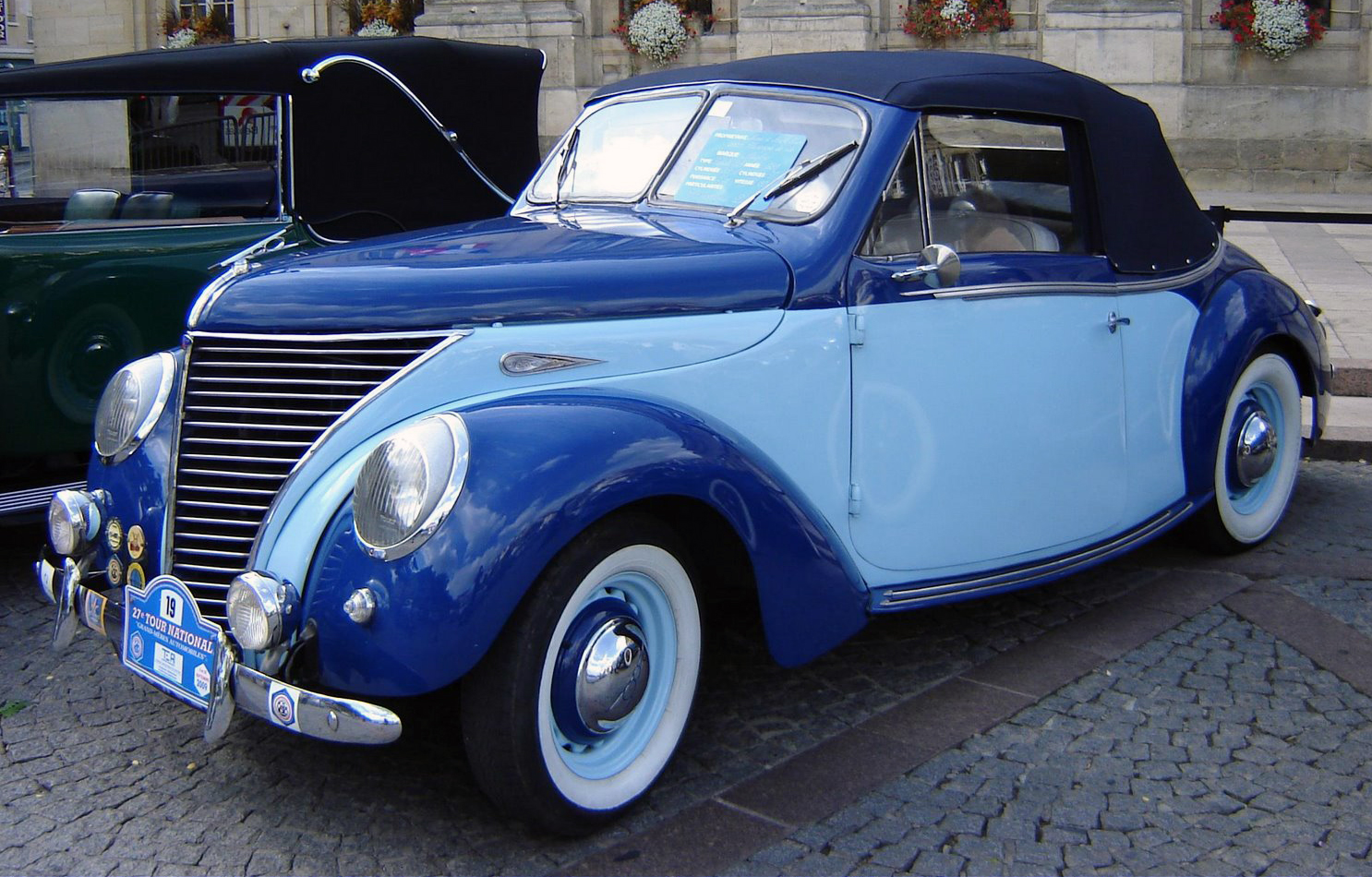
Matford F81A Cabriolet (1938)

== See also ==
- Front wheel drive
- Tracfort

== Bibliography ==
- Beaulieu Encyclopedia of the Automobile. Editor G.N. Georgano. London. 2000. ISBN 1-57958-293-1
