= Chausson =

Chausson may refer to:

- Chausson (surname)
- Société des usines Chausson, defunct French bus and car parts manufacturers
- Chausson (recreational vehicle), French manufacturer of recreational vehicles
- Chausson (martial arts), French martial art
- Ernest Chausson, a French romantic composer
- Chausson aux pommes, a French viennoiserie. Alternative flavour included Chausson au Citron
