= Stellantis Poissy Plant =

French car manufacturing and assembly plant

Coordinates: 48.9425°N 2.0500°E

Location of the Stellantis Poissy plant in the Île-de-France

The Stellantis site in Poissy (Yvelines, France) has an automobile production plant, a digital production plant and a "Green Campus", bordering the River Seine and served by the railway and the A13 Paris - Normandie motorway. Together with the R&D Centres at Carrières-sous-Poissy and at Vélizy, it is one of three major establishments that the company runs in the department.

The Poissy plant was commissioned by Ford France in 1937 and opened in 1940 a few weeks before the German invasion. When, in 1954, Ford sold their business to Simca, the Poissy plant was included in the deal. Less than ten years later Simca closed their existing plant at Nanterre, leaving Poissy as their only significant auto-production facility. Ownership passed again in 1963, this time to Chrysler who in that year acquired a controlling interest in Simca.

In 1978, Peugeot acquired Chrysler's European business. Former Simca models were rebadged as Talbots and continued to be produced at the Poissy plant during the early 1980s. However, the mid-range hatchback that had been designed to sustain the Talbot brand was rebadged ahead of its 1985 launch as the Peugeot 309. That is the name under which it was sold, and since that time the plant has concentrated on the production of small Citroën and Peugeot badged models.

== History ==
The construction of the Poissy plant was the project of Maurice Dollfus, Ford's dynamic boss in France. In 1932, governments had responded to economic contraction by raising tariff barriers, and Ford had responded to the need to source vehicles locally by entering into an agreement, in 1934, with the Strasbourg-based Mathis company to produce Ford-designed cars, which would be branded as Matfords, in an extended Strasbourg plant. Ford brought cash to the deal, and a fractious partnership ensued, Mathis having found themselves obliged to abandon production of their own cars in October 1934. For Dollfus the Poissy plant, commissioned in 1938, would provide a route away from the by now bitterly litigious Matford relationship. Construction began on a large 240,000 m2 site bordering the River Seine in Poissy at the start of November 1938 and progressed remarkably rapidly, with the plant formally completed on 1 May 1940. Located a short distance downstream from Paris along the (here fully navigable) River Seine, Poissy was near to Asnières, which was home to Chausson, at that time a car body producer and principal supplier to Ford France. The site was also adjacent to the main railway line connecting Paris with Le Havre.

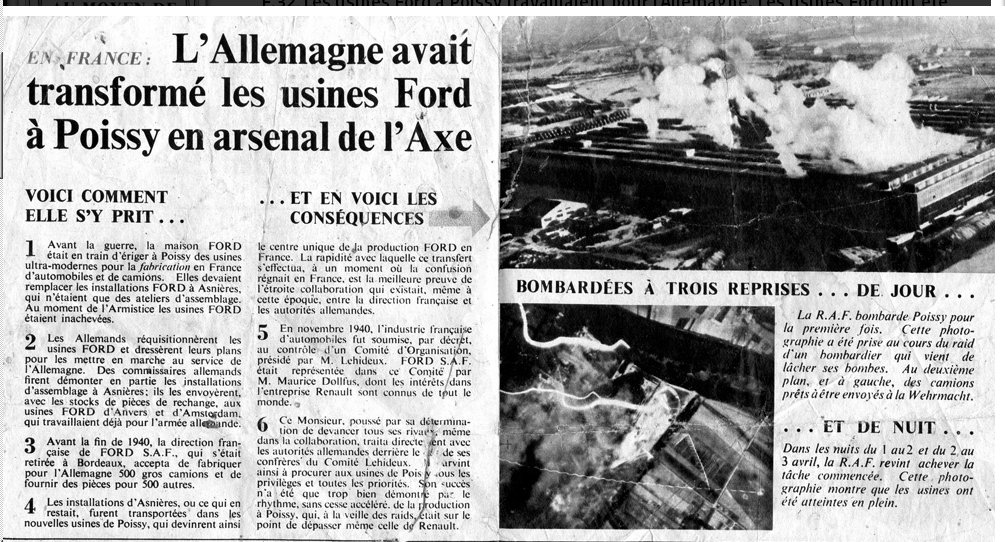
British propaganda showing the bombing of the Ford plant in 1942.

The principal product to be produced at Poissy was to be closely based on the Matford “Alsace” V8, itself a version of the existing US 3622 cc Ford Model 48 but with a restyled rear. The overall silhouette of the car closely resembled that of the Ford Pilot which was produced for a few years by Ford of Britain from 1947. The other car to be built at Poissy was the Matford Alsace V8 13CV, which had a smaller 2158 cc engine. It looked virtually identical to the larger engined car, though was actually slightly shorter. These cars had started life in 1935 as products of the Matford joint venture, but the cars produced at Ford's new Poissy plant would presumably have been badged as Fords. The plant became operational in the late Spring of 1940, and there was therefore very little time in which to produce anything before the débacle of May 1940. On 14 June 1940, Poissy was occupied by the German Army; under conditions of occupation, the plant concentrated on light trucks. As the war dragged on, there was a move, in 1943, to crate up Ford's newly completed Poissy plant for shipment to the company's Cologne location, but this was blocked, apparently due to the intervention of a recently resigned but still influential former Vichy government minister called François Lehideux. Seven years later, in 1950, Lehideux replaced Maurice Dollfus at the top of Ford's French operation.

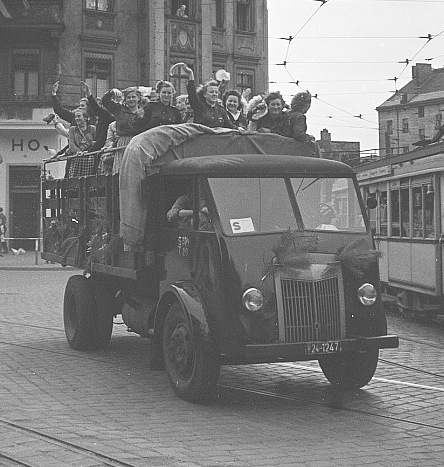
Matford F11W or similar (ca 1942-1944)

Poissy was liberated by the Americans on 26 August 1944 after several days of bombardment and civilian casualties, notably on 18 August. Ford's boss, Maurice Dollfus was promptly arrested on suspicion of collaboration and transferred to Drancy. However, his release came quite quickly and the plant switched to supporting the allied war effort. Initially, the government mandated Poissy to produce the light trucks that it had produced before the war, and in 1946 production commenced of the Ford F698W 5 ton truck known as the “Poissy”. Also in 1946, Poissy reverted to producing the smaller engined 2,225 cc V-8 engined Matford based model, albeit with improved suspension and brakes. The car was known in France as the Ford 13CV, although subsequently it is also called more formally the Ford F-472 and, after the first 300 had been produced, the Ford F-472A. The 4,270 cars produced in 1947 were well short of Ford's ambitions for the new plant ten years earlier, but with basic materials in short supply and customers short of money, in the late 1940s none of the French auto-makers experienced a rapid return to pre-war volumes.

In much of industry, including the auto-industry, the immediate post-war years were characterised by industrial unrest, and Ford's Poissy plant was badly affected. Nevertheless, in October 1948 the North American designed Ford Vedette, still powered by the company's familiar V8 2158 cc engine, made its first appearance at a Paris Motor Show: this quickly became Poissy's principal model and during the early 1950s it certainly sold better than the aged Ford F-472A had. Nevertheless, François Lehideux who took over from Maurice Dollfus in January 1950 was known to be dissatisfied with aspects of the new car. Sales volumes were disappointing, and although the engine was produced in-house and final assembly took place at the Poissy plant, other components and sub-assemblies were bought in which was believed to make production vulnerable to supplier problems. Scope for improvement was limited by shortage of investment cash and the limited market for cars with engines above 2 litres in size in a country where the tax regime heavily penalised larger engines. Nevertheless, a new V8 model for Ford of France was pencilled in for 1954.

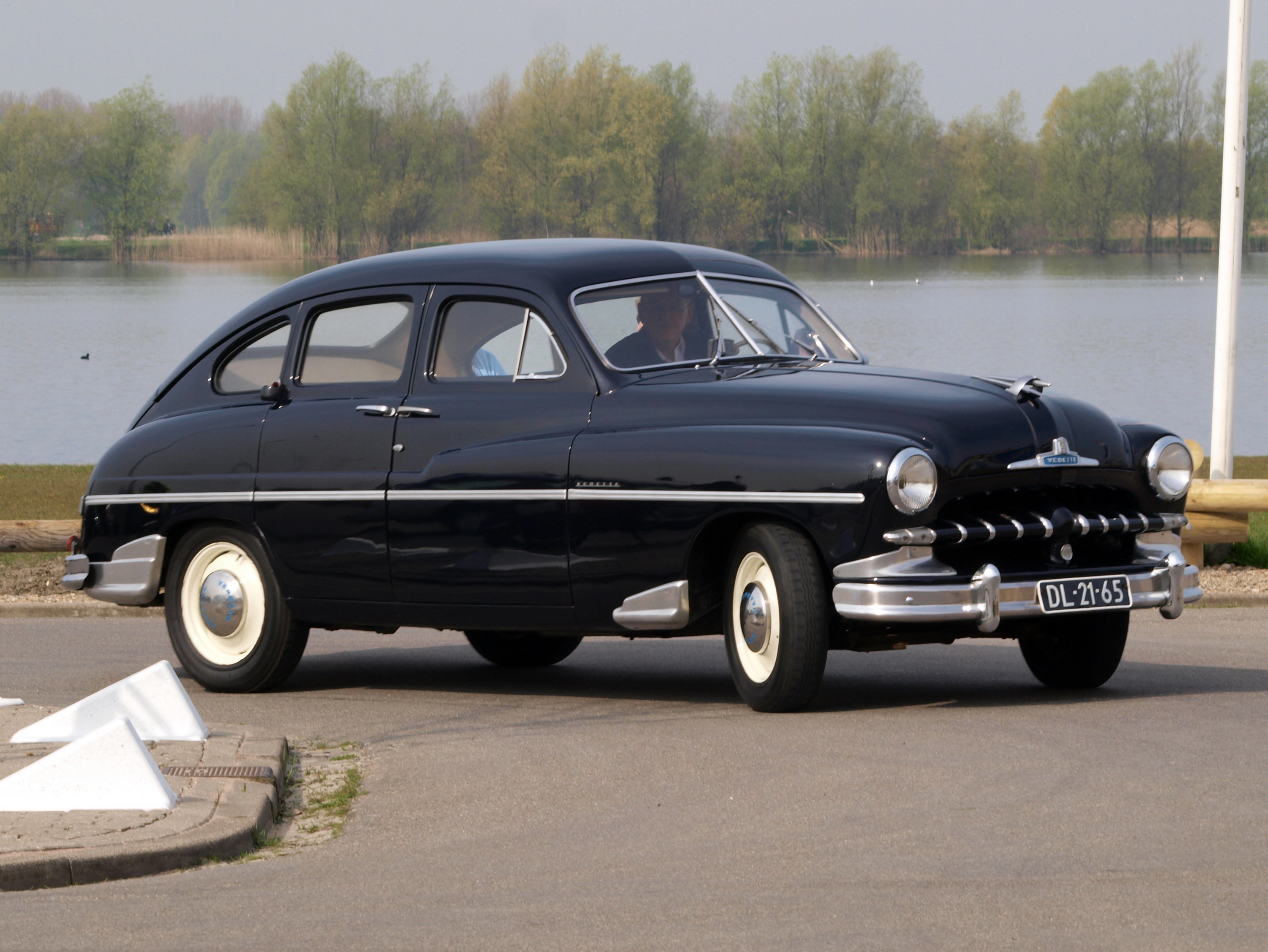
Ford Vedette (1952)

In the late 1940s, politics in Europe remained highly polarised and Henry Ford would have been aware of the continuing popularity of the French Communist Party, routinely winning 25% of the votes in national elections till the mid-1950s, buoyed both by the delicate state of the French economy and by the prominent role played by communists in the French Resistance. The strikes that afflicted Ford's Poissy plant, and the poor industrial relations tradition of Renault’s plant at nearby Boulogne-Billancourt will have done nothing to reassure Ford about the future direction of the French economy, and it became known that Ford were looking to sell their French manufacturing business, of which the Poissy plant was the principal fixed asset. Henri Pigozzi, the Turin born boss of Simca must have taken a more positive view of the outlook for the French auto-industry, and in 1954 Ford sold their French manufacturing business to Simca along with rights to the new model that it was about to launch. Poissy's new model would be sold with a wide range of names, and in many export markets it would be badged as a Ford during its first few years, but in retrospect it is remembered as the Simca Vedette. In France it was sold with Simca badging right from the start.

The Simca acquisition triggered a major expansion at the Poissy site. During 1955, new factory buildings were constructed so that by the end of the year, more than half of the site had been built on.

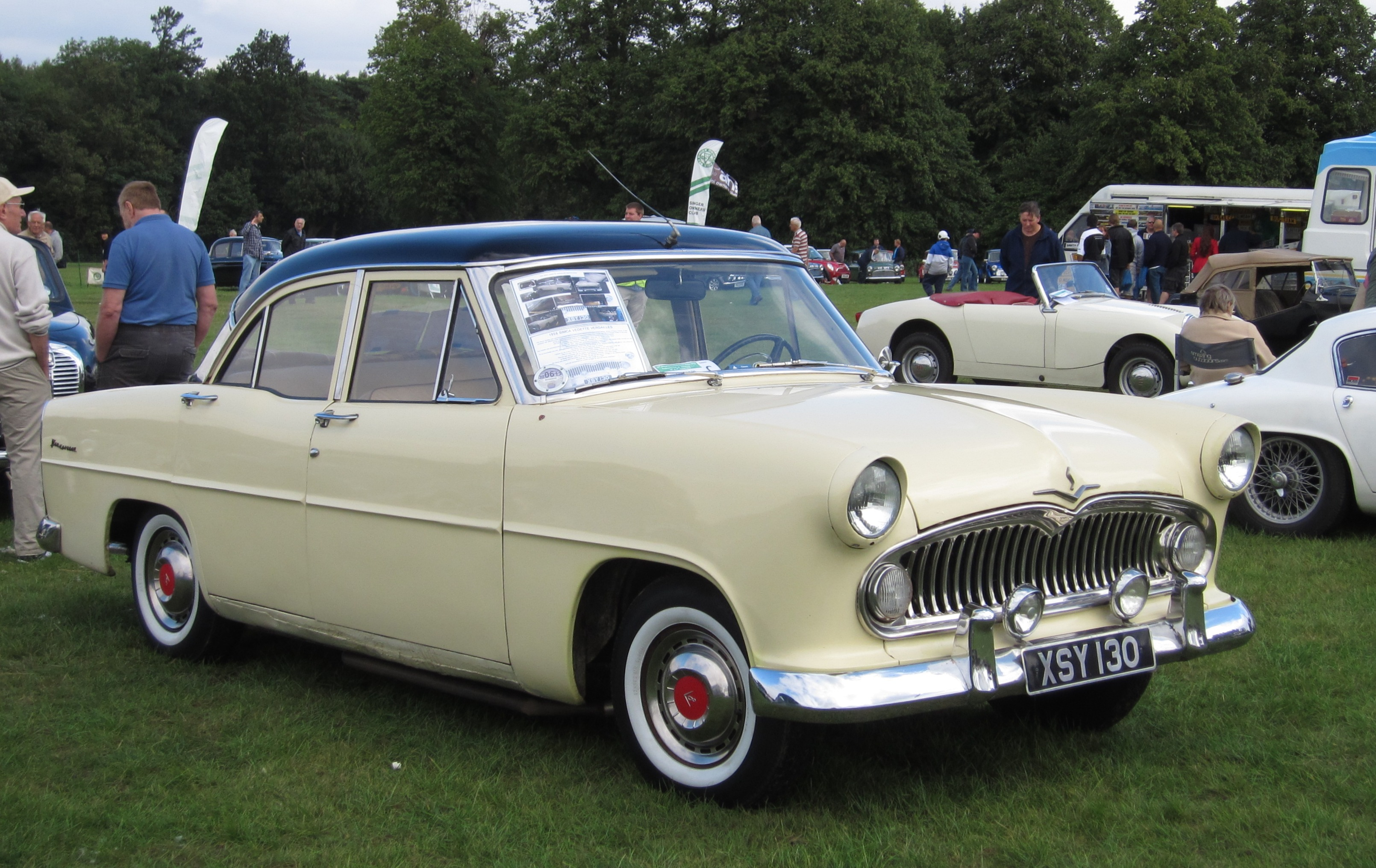
Simca Vedette (1956)

During the early 1950s, the economy finally started to grow again, and the Simca Vedette made a strong start, with 42,439 produced in 1955 and 44,836 in 1956. These figures probably fell well short of expectations when the site was acquired in 1937, but it was still a fourteenfold increase over the 3,023 cars produced in 1947. Unfortunately the Suez Crisis struck at the end of 1956, and the resulting fuel shortages placed the emphasis back on very small cars. Sales of the V8 Simcas recovered a little by the end of the decade, but production volumes never again approached those of 1956. Simca responded rapidly by adding to their range the Simca Ariane which was a big car with a small engine, also produced in Poissy, which during the ensuing six years clocked up over 160,000 sales. However, by now, the large car market in France was increasingly dominated by the Citroën DS which was in a lower car tax bracket than the V8 Simcas and had, after a slow start, caught the spirit of the new age.

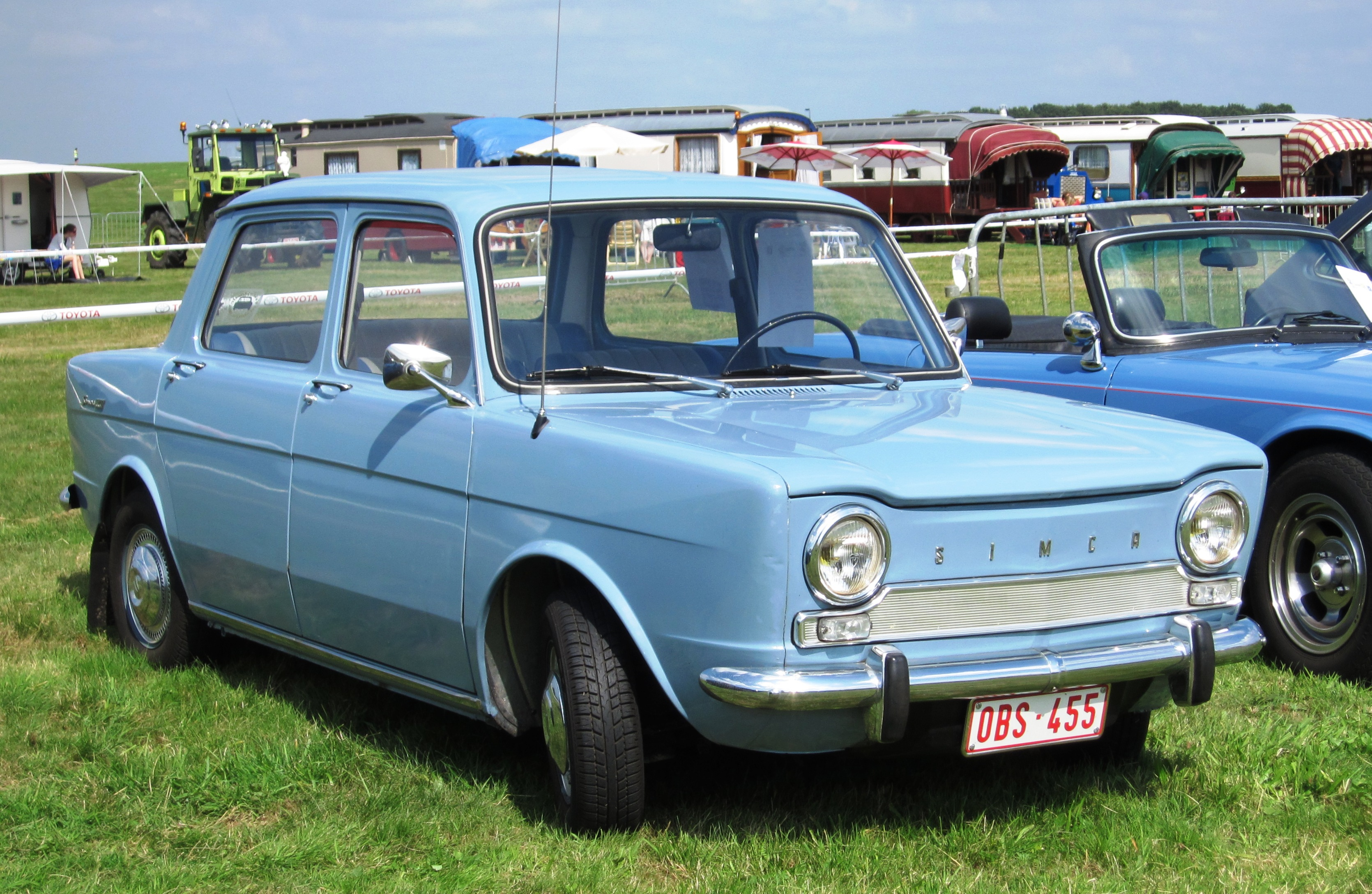
Simca 1000 (1961). The Simca 1000 was the first Poissy product to exceed the million units threshold.

By 1961, it was not lack of customer demand that was squeezing Vedette production, but Simca's own preparations for a return to small car production. Poissy's large site had always been underutilised, and the Simca 1000 was intended to make far better use of Poissy's potential capacity than either Ford or Simca had hitherto achieved. With more than 100,000 Simca 1000s produced every year from 1962 to 1973, Simca succeeded in this. Nevertheless, there would still be capacity to spare at Poissy, and in 1961 Simca sold the plant at Nanterre which they had used since 1934. After this, Poissy was Simca's only large scale production facility in France.

As part of the deal by which the Ford business had been sold to Simca in 1954, Ford had acquired a 15% stake in Simca. However, the Ford shares were sold to Chrysler in 1958. The Chrysler stake in Simca was increased and became a controlling one in 1963. Between 1963 and 1978, Poissy was owned by Chrysler, and Chrysler's Pentastar emblem started to appear on the cars produced there, replacing Simca's "dove" emblem. The Simca name would nonetheless remain on French market cars, such as the Simca 1307 launched in 1975, for several more years, even after exported cars came only with Chrysler badges.

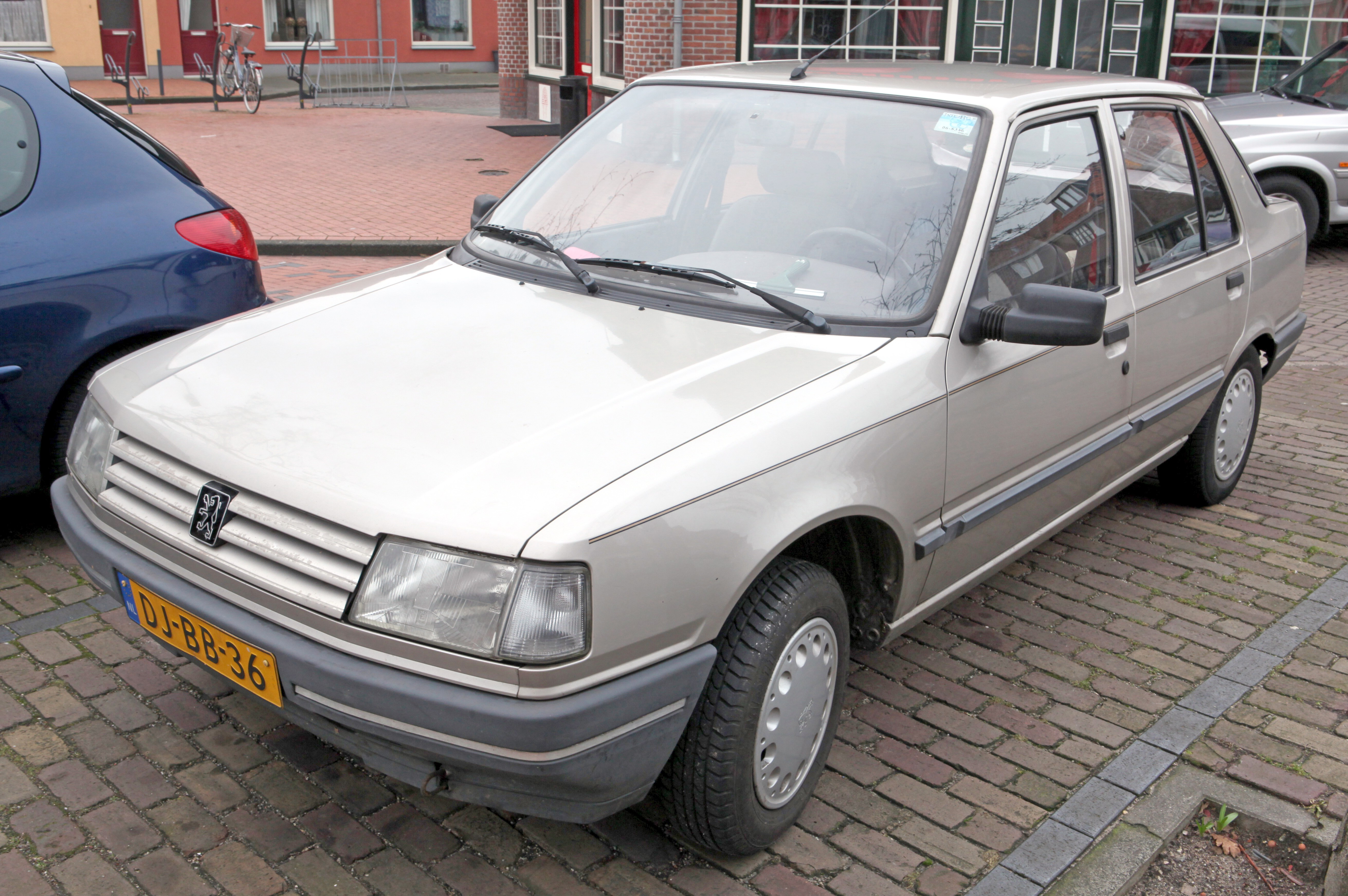
Peugeot 309 (1985)

Late in the 1970s, Chrysler withdrew from Europe in response to financial pressures on the parent company, and on 10 August 1978 the entire business was sold to PSA Peugeot Citroën. Poissy continued for the time being to produce the cars designed as Simcas, but these were now rebadged as Talbots. The Simca brand disappeared in 1980, although Peugeot continues to own the name. It appeared at the time that Peugeot intended to produce three ranges, Peugeot, Citroën and Talbot, in parallel, maximising commonality for the components that few customers studied while maximising the differences in terms of body design and interior fittings. However, the reintroduced Talbot brand had not, in its 1980s incarnation, had time to generate huge amounts of brand loyalty, and the next new model from Poissy, scheduled to replace the Talbot Horizon, was first postponed and then turned up in 1985 badged as the Peugeot 309 - with Poissy producing left-hand drive models and the former Rootes Group factory at Ryton near Coventry producing the right-hand drive versions. This followed Peugeot's decision to discontinue the Talbot brand on passenger cars, although it survived until 1994 on commercial vehicles.

1986 saw Poissy produce its last Talbot-badged car, and the plant's next significant new model was Peugeot’s mainstream small family car, the Peugeot 306, which went into production there at the end of 1992 in left-hand drive form, with Ryton once again producing the right-hand drive versions. Between 1992 and 2002, the Peugeot 306 was Poissy’s top product, and the plant manufactured 1,685,470 of them.

From 2002, the emphasis switched to the company’s "Platform 1" small cars, the Peugeot 206 and 207 along with their Citroën counterparts such as the Citroën C3 and the Citroën DS3. The plant has also become a major supplier of parts and sub-assemblies to other PSA group plants, and has grown to a point where it has an annual production capacity of 400,000 cars. The 206 was also produced at Ryton until Peugeot closed the plant down in December 2006, switching production to Slovakia before it was finally discontinued in 2010.

== Current production ==
- DS 3 (2018–present)
- Opel Mokka (2020–present)

== Connections ==
=== Railway ===
The site of Stellantis is remotely connected with Poissy station, served by trains of RER A and Transilien Line J.

=== Bus ===
The site of Stellantis is also served by many bus lines:

- Mantois: 5433, 5437, 5438, 5448, 5458
- Poissy - Les Mureaux: 6590 6591 6592 6593 6594 6595

== Bibliography ==
- Nicolas Hatzfeld, Poissy, une légende automobile, E.T.A.I., 2002, (ISBN 2-7268-8520-9), 222 p.
