= Maurice Dollfus =

French businessman (1885–1972)

Maurice Dollfus (26 October 1883 – 25 May 1972) was appointed to head up Ford of France in 1930. Four years later he negotiated an agreement with Mathis which led to the creation of the Matford joint project in 1934 in order to enable Ford to grow its French business at a time of increased protectionism and at an acceptable cost. When the Matford partnership fell apart it was Dollfus who created Ford’s new plant at Poissy which was ready to produce cars in 1940 and which allowed the company an impressive annual production capacity (that would never be reached while Ford owned the plant) of 100,000 cars.

Like many industrialists Dollfus was arrested in September 1944, suspected of collaboration in the fevered period of retribution that directly followed the Liberation, and he was transferred to Drancy (where he met Sacha Guitry). However he was quickly released and in 1945 received from the Americans an award reserved for companies that had contributed to the allied victory.

After 1945 he continued to lead Ford in France, obtaining from the Americans a ready developed new model that became the future Ford Vedette. However, aged 66 he quit Ford in January 1950 after presiding over the difficult gestation period of the Vedette, during which the company was troubled by serious industrial strife as well as the huge challenges that faced all auto-makers in France during the later 1940s. Dollfus was succeeded at Ford by François Lehideux, who was both a former Renault plant manager and a former minister under the Vichy regime.
