= Mathis Vega 42 =

Vega 42
- Type: Radial engine
- National origin: France
- Manufacturer: Société Mathis Aviation
- Designer: Émile E. C. Mathis / Raymond Georges
- First run: 1938

The Mathis Vega 42 was a 42-cylinder 6-bank in-line radial piston engine, designed and built in France, by Société Mathis Aviation in the late 1930s, with development continuing during and after WWII.

== Design and development ==
Émile E. C. Mathis had begun designing and producing motor-cars from 1910. Société Mathis Aviation, formed in 1937, began designing aircraft engines, initially with the large and complex Vega.

The Vega (and the similar Vesta) had a 2-piece Aluminium-alloy crankcase, 7 Aluminium-alloy cylinder blocks, with one-piece Aluminium-alloy heads and steel cylinder liners. A 6-throw crankshaft ran in 7 plain bearings.

Development continued after the war, culminating in the 119.4 L (7,290 cu in) 3,700 kW (5,000 hp) Vesta 42, which did not reach the hardware stage before Mathis closed its doors.

== Operational history ==
The Vega engines were run on test-beds, and some sources indicate the engine was flown 100 hours in a test bed aircraft during 1939, but no details of flight testing survive.

== Variants ==
Vega 42A
Initial version of the engine first run in 1938, rated 1,700 kW (2,300 hp) at 3,000 rpm. Two examples and a full-scale mock-up are reported to have been built.
Vega 42B
An improved variant, under development in 1940. Completed and unfinished engines were hidden from invading German forces, in the Pyrenees.
Vega 42D
An enlarged capacity version which became the Vesta 42.
Vega 42E
Post WWII development rated at 2,100 kW (2,800 hp) for take-off.
Vesta 42
An enlarged Vega, developed from 1942, with similar configuration, but 158 mm (6.22 in) bore, 145 mm (5.71 in) stroke and 119.4 L (7,290 cu in) displacement, rated at 3,700 kW (5,000 hp).

== Specifications (42E-00) ==
Data from Old Machine Press: Mathis Vega 42-Cylinder Aircraft Engine, Aircraft engines of the World 1946

=== General characteristics ===
- Type: 42 cylinder in-line radial engine (6 7-cylinder banks)
- Bore: 125 mm (4.92 in)
- Stroke: 115 mm (4.53 in)
- Displacement: 59.3 L (3,620 cu in)
- Length: 1,520 mm (59.84 in)
- Diameter: 1,070 mm (42.13 in)
- Dry weight: 1,180 kg (2,600 lb)
  - Maximum Brake Mean Effective Power (b.m.e.p.) 13.4 kg/cm^{2} (191 psi)

=== Components ===
- Valvetrain: 1 exhaust and 1 inlet valve per cylinder driven by 7x single overhead camshafts (SOHC)
- Supercharger: Gear-driven single-stage driven at 5.53:1, with automatic boost control.
- Fuel system: 1x Zenith 160 2-barrel downdraught carburetor
- Fuel type: 100/130 Octane aviation gasolene
- Oil system: Pressure feed at 690 kPa (100 psi), dry sump using 25.1 cs (0.00418 min) viscosity oil
- Cooling system: liquid-cooled
- Reduction gear: Epicyclic bevel reduction gear at 0.42:1

=== Performance ===
- Power output: Take-off:2,100 kW (2,800 hp) at 3,200 rpm at 1.2 m (3 ft 11 in) +8.6lb boost

Normal:1,700 kW (2,300 hp) at 3,000 rpm at 2,000 m (6,600 ft)
Cruising:1,300 kW (1,700 hp) at 2,500 rpm at 2,000 m (6,600 ft)

- Specific power: 35 kW/L (0.77 hp/cu in)
- Compression ratio: 6.5
- Specific fuel consumption: 0.292 kg/kW (0.48 lb/hp) per hour, cruising
- Oil consumption: 0.011 kg/kW (0.018 lb/hp) per hour, cruising
- Power-to-weight ratio: 0.57 kg/kW (0.93 lb/hp)

== See also ==
- Armstrong Siddeley Deerhound
