= Armstrong Siddeley Deerhound =

Deerhound
- The Armstrong Siddeley Deerhound
- Type: inline-bank radial engine
- National origin: United Kingdom
- Manufacturer: Armstrong Siddeley
- First run: 1935
- Major applications: Armstrong Whitworth Whitley
- Number built: 11

The Armstrong Siddeley Deerhound was a large aero engine developed by Armstrong Siddeley between 1935 and 1941. An increased capacity variant known as the Boarhound was never flown, and a related, much larger, design known as the Wolfhound existed on paper only. Development of these engines was interrupted in April 1941, when the company's factory was bombed, and on 3 October 1941 the project was cancelled by the Air Ministry.

== Design and development ==
The Deerhound I was a triple-row, 21-cylinder, air-cooled radial engine design with the unusual feature of inline cylinder banks. Unlike earlier Armstrong Siddeley engines the Deerhound used overhead camshafts to operate its poppet valves, using one camshaft for each bank of three cylinders.

Flight testing began in 1938 using an Armstrong Whitworth Whitley II, serial number K7243, during which cooling problems were encountered with the rear row of cylinders. This problem was solved by a 'reversed-flow' cooling system, in which a large air duct at the rear of the cowling took in air and directed it forward to exit behind the propeller. The project suffered a severe setback when the Whitley crashed on takeoff in March 1940, fatally injuring its crew. The accident was attributed to an incorrect elevator trim setting and was not related to the engines. A single prototype Deerhound III was built and ran, and survived until the late-1970s before being scrapped. Development work on the early engines was cancelled by the Air Ministry on 23 April 1941, but running of the Mk III was allowed to continue until 3 October 1941; at this point all records were ordered to be handed over to Rolls-Royce.

A projected increased capacity variant known as the Boarhound was planned but never built, and a related much larger design, the Wolfhound, existed on paper only. The latter engine featured six banks of four cylinders, a displacement of around 61 litres (3,733 cu in) and a projected takeoff power rating of 2,600–2,800 horsepower (1,900–2,100 kW).

== Armstrong Siddeley in-line radial engines ==
The Hyena arrangement of cylinder banks arranged as a radial engine was continued with further designs, but with little commercial success. Only the Deerhound and Hyena were built.

Hyena
15 cylinders (5 banks of 3 cyl.)
Terrier
14 cylinders (7 banks of 2 cyl.)
Deerhound
21 cylinders (7 banks of 3 cyl.)
Wolfhound
28 cylinders (7 banks of 4 cyl.)
Boarhound
24 cylinders (6 banks of 4 cyl., same format as the later Junkers Jumo 222)
Mastiff
36 cylinders (9 banks of 4 cyl.)

== Variants ==
Deerhound I
1,115 hp (831 kW): four built.
Deerhound II
1,500 hp (1,118 kW), capacity enlarged to 41 L (2,509 cu in) by increasing bore 5.31 in (135 mm) and stroke 5.51 in (140 mm): six built.
Deerhound III
1,800 hp (1,342 kW), major redesign by Stewart Tresilian: one engine built.

== Applications ==
This engine's sole aircraft application was in a modified Armstrong Whitworth Whitley which was used as a testbed.

== Specifications (Deerhound I) ==
Data from Lumsden.

=== General characteristics ===
- Type: 21-cylinder, 3-row air-cooled radial engine with 7 inline banks
- Bore: 5.26 in (134 mm)
- Stroke: 4.95 in (126 mm)
- Displacement: 2,259.75 cu in (37.03 L)

=== Components ===
- Valvetrain: Overhead camshaft
- Supercharger: Fully supercharged
- Fuel type: 87 Octane avgas
- Cooling system: Air-cooled
- Reduction gear: Epicyclic 0.432:1

=== Performance ===
- Power output: 1,115 hp (831 kW) at 1,500 rpm

== See also ==
Comparable engines

- Armstrong Siddeley Hyena
- BMW 803
- Dobrynin VD-4K
- Isotta Fraschini Zeta
- Junkers Jumo 222
- Lycoming R-7755
- Mathis Vega 42
- Wright R-2160 Tornado

Related lists

- List of aircraft engines
