= Chausson (surname) =

Chausson is a French surname. Notable people with the surname include:

- Anne-Caroline Chausson, French BMX and mountain bike racer
- Ernest Chausson (1855–1899), French composer
- Jacques Chausson (c. 1618–1661), French writer
