= Émile Mathis =

French businessman

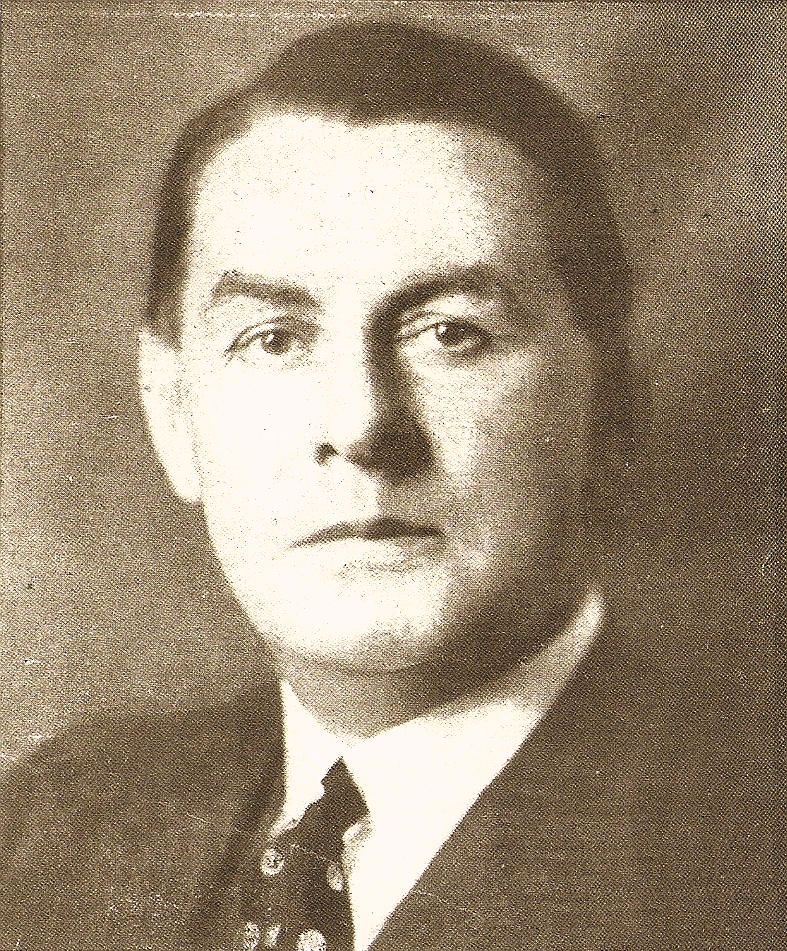
- Émile Mathis in 1931
- Born: Émile Mathis; 15 March 1880
- Died: 3 August 1956 (aged 76)

Ernest Charles "Émile" Mathis (15 March 1880 – 3 August 1956) was a French businessman who founded the car firm Mathis in 1910. (Before the frontier moved in 1919, he would have considered himself a German businessman and the car firm was a German business.)

The son of a Strasbourg hotelier, Mathis was born in Strasbourg, which at the time was in Germany. Between 1902 and 1904, he worked for the car firm Lorraine-Dietrich, with Ettore Bugatti. In 1904, Mathis and Bugatti designed the Hermes car, which for some reason was known as the "Burlington" when sold in England. Mathis founded his own car company in 1910 and the following year was a protagonist of the small, multi-cylinder engine, probably inspired by Bugatti.

In 1907, Mathis developed a large factory in Strasbourg, where his cars were later made.

During the Great Depression, Mathis looked for a partner for his firm and eventually chose Ford of America in 1934. The firm was briefly known as "Matford" (Mathis + Ford).

Following the outbreak of the Second World War, as the German army invaded France, Mathis escaped to America, where he lived and worked throughout the war. He returned to Europe in 1946.

Mathis died after falling out of a hotel window in Geneva in 1956.

== Literature ==
- Pierre Haas: Émile Mathis - Passionnément automobile, Portraits célèbres d'Alasce, Éditions Vent d'Est (2013) ISBN 979-10-90826-19-9
