= Mathis (automobile) =

Former French automobile manufacturer

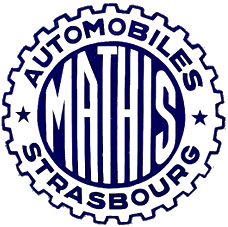
- Industry: Manufacturing
- Founded: 1905
- Founder: Émile Mathis
- Defunct: 1946; 80 years ago
- Headquarters: Strasbourg (France)
- Products: Automobiles

Mathis S.A. was an automobile manufacturer in Alsace that produced cars between 1910 and 1950. Founder Émile Mathis (1880–1956) was born in Strasbourg and died in Geneva.

== Hermès-Simplex ==
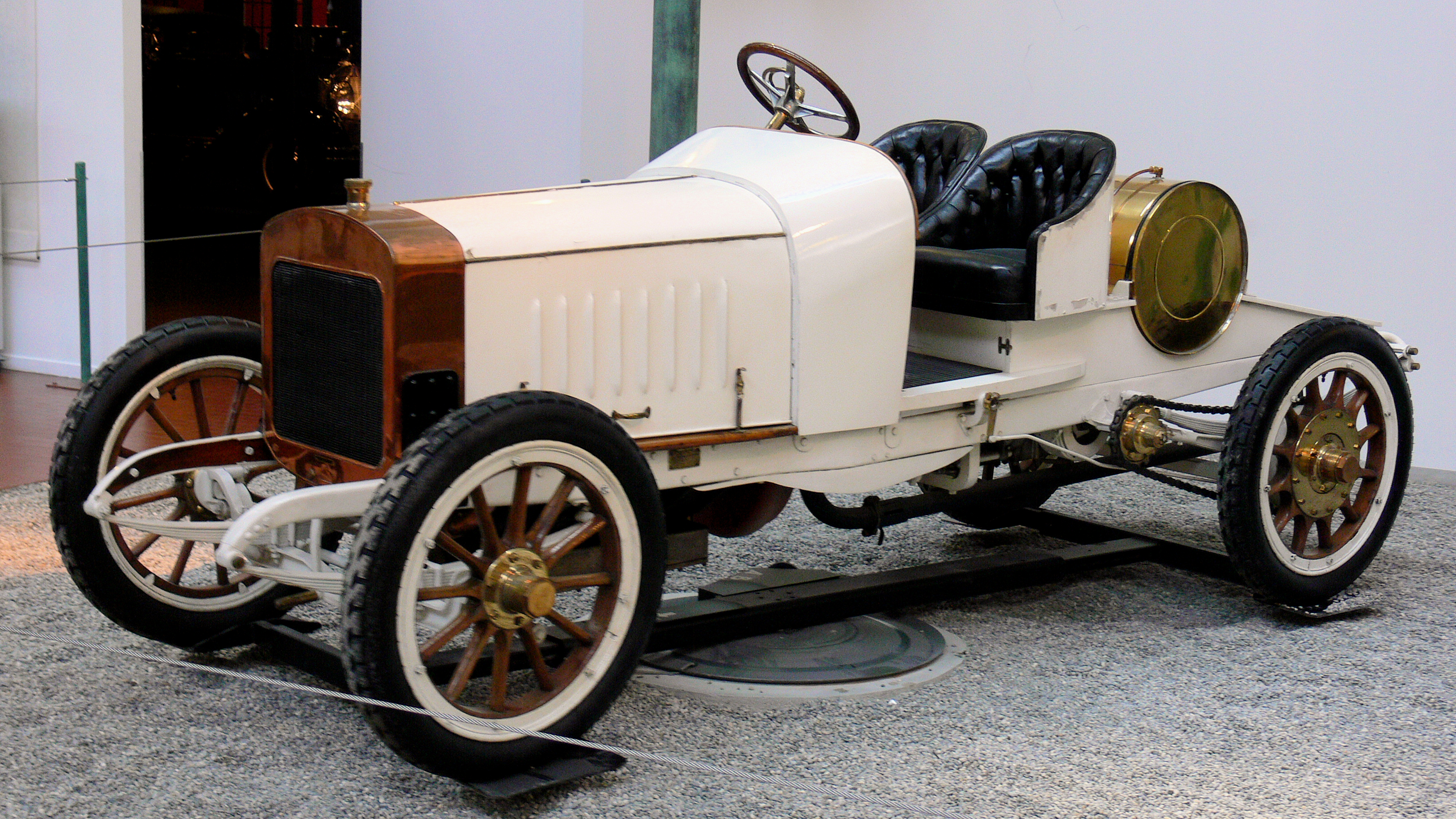
Hermès designed by Ettore Bugatti

Émile Mathis was a leading car dealer in Strasbourg, Alsace, handling Fiat, De Dietrich and Panhard-Levassor, among other makes from his Auto-Mathis-Palace. Two models were designed for him by the young Ettore Bugatti. Made at his Graffenstaden factory he marketed them under the brand Hermes with 28, 40, or 98 hp engines. They were Mercedes-like cars with chain drives. Designer and racing-driver Dragutin Esser then created two cars of 2025 cc and 2253 cc which were built under license from Stoewer.

== Mathis ==
The Mathis 8/20 PS was first offered in 1910 but the first real success came just before World War I with two smaller models: Babylette had a 1.1 L engine and Baby had a 1.3 L engine. There was also a Mathis-Knight model.

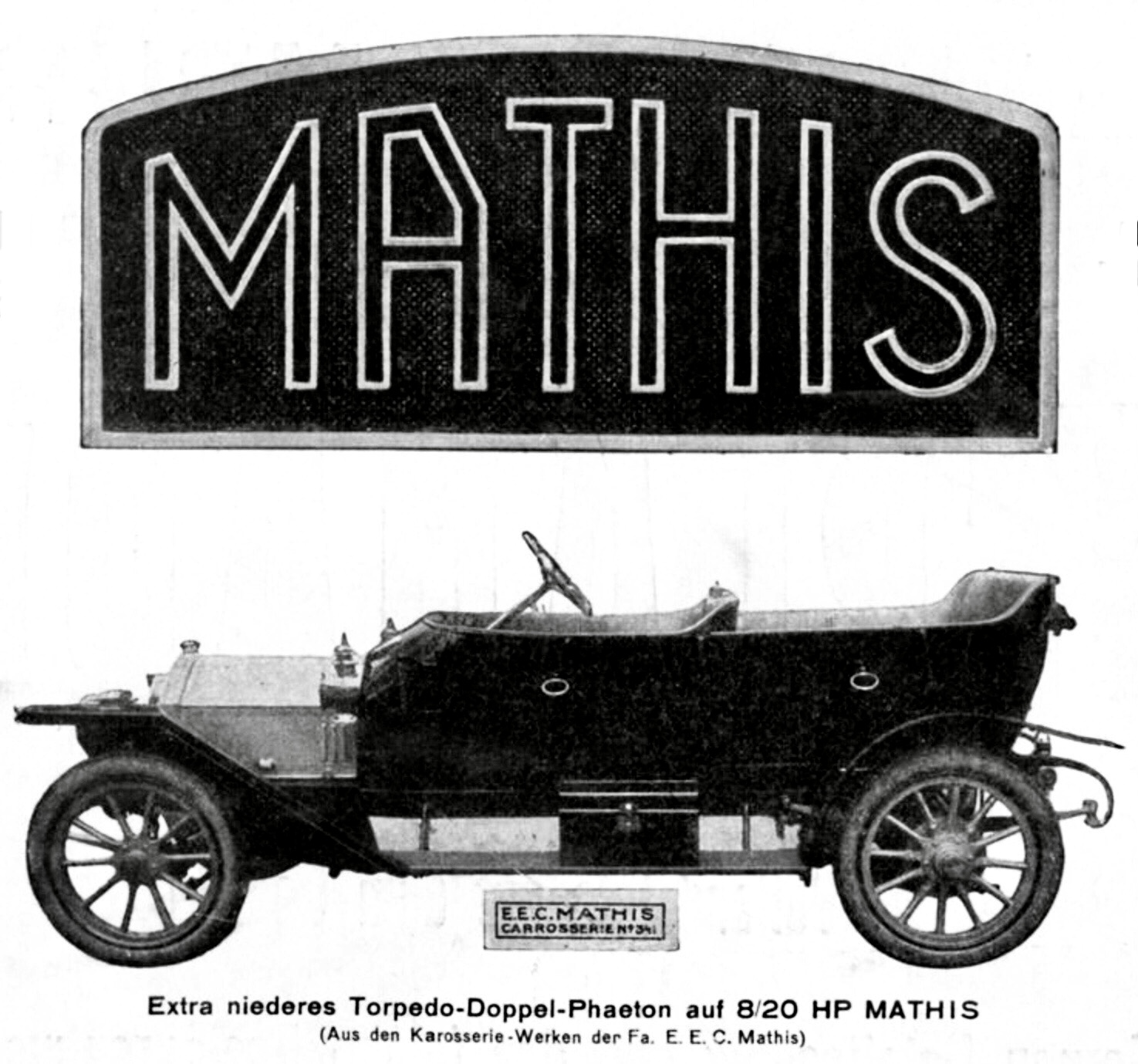
Mathis 8/20 HP (1911).

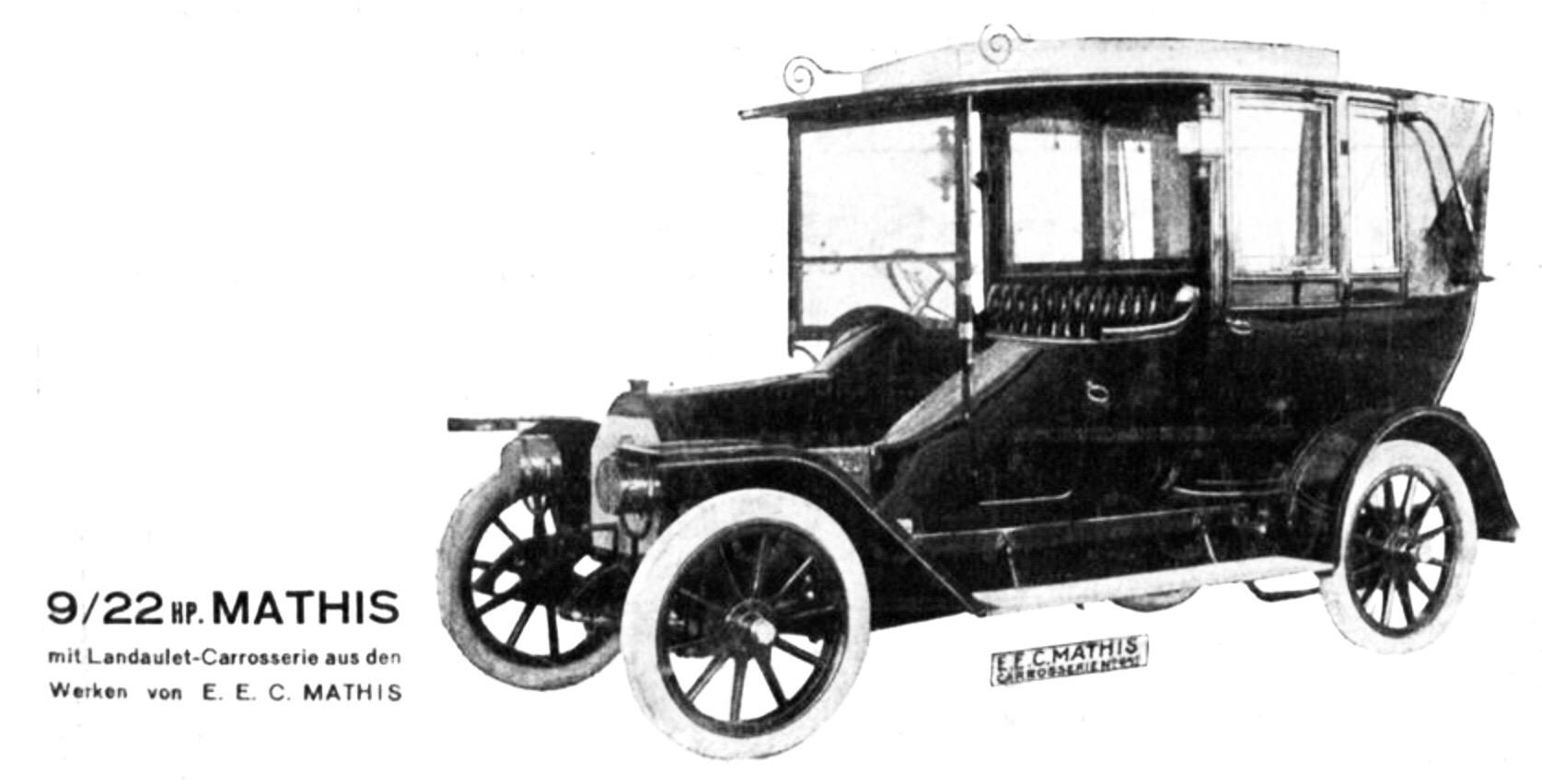
Mathis 9/22 HP (1912).

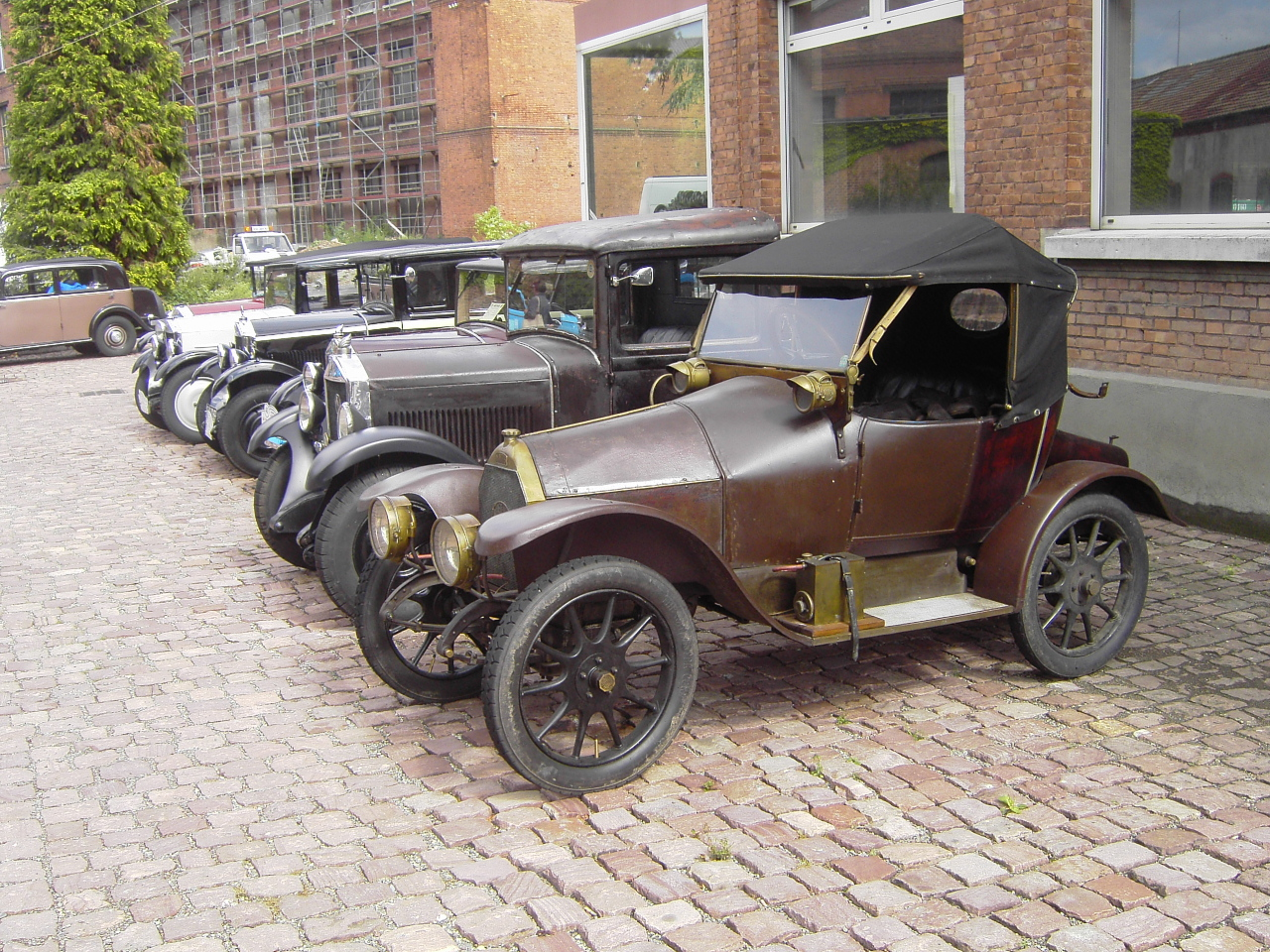
1913 Babylette

During World War I, Mathis was sent by the German government (Alsace was then part of Germany) to Switzerland to buy tires and after one of these trips, he went to France and remained there. After the war, Alsace became part of France and he was able to return to his factory.

After the war, the firm's production increased quickly and soon became No.4 in France making more than 20,000 cars in 1927. Mathis attempted to compete with Citroën. The SB model of 1921 was followed by a six-cylinder model (1188 cc) in 1923 and an eight-cylinder in 1925. From 1927, Mathis followed a one-model policy. MY has a side-valve four-cylinder engine (1.2 L). Not surprisingly, the next year saw the Emysix, with a 2288 cc six-cylinder.

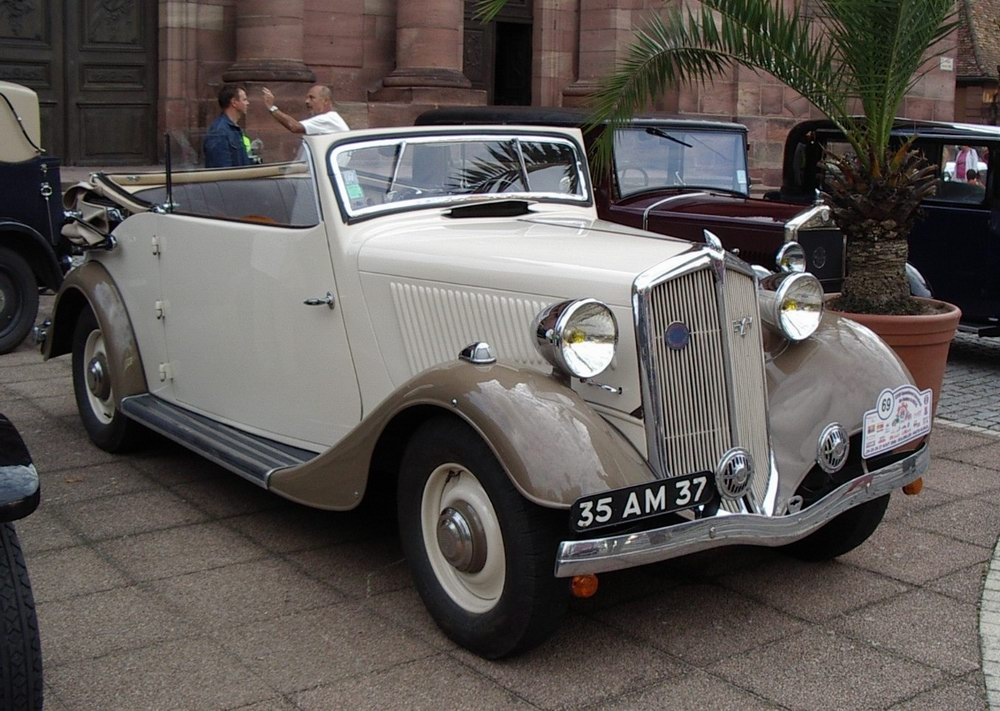
EY4 Emyquatre cabriolet

=== Matam, Durant ===
In 1930 there was an unsuccessful attempt to co-operate with William Crapo Durant (the founder of General Motors in 1908). Their ambitious plan was to make 100,000 cars in Durant's Lansing, Michigan plant. However, Durant ran out of money before production could begin so Mathis stayed in France. The American company was Matam, Mathis-America.

=== Depression ===
A short-lived model named FOH in 1931 had a 3 Litre straight-eight-cylinder engine. More modern and successful was the 1445 cc Emyquatre in 1933, which possessed a synchromesh gearbox, hydraulic brakes and independent front suspension. Emyhuit (obviously, an 8-cylinder) came too late to prevent Mathis from a fast decline. The Mathis factories were closed.

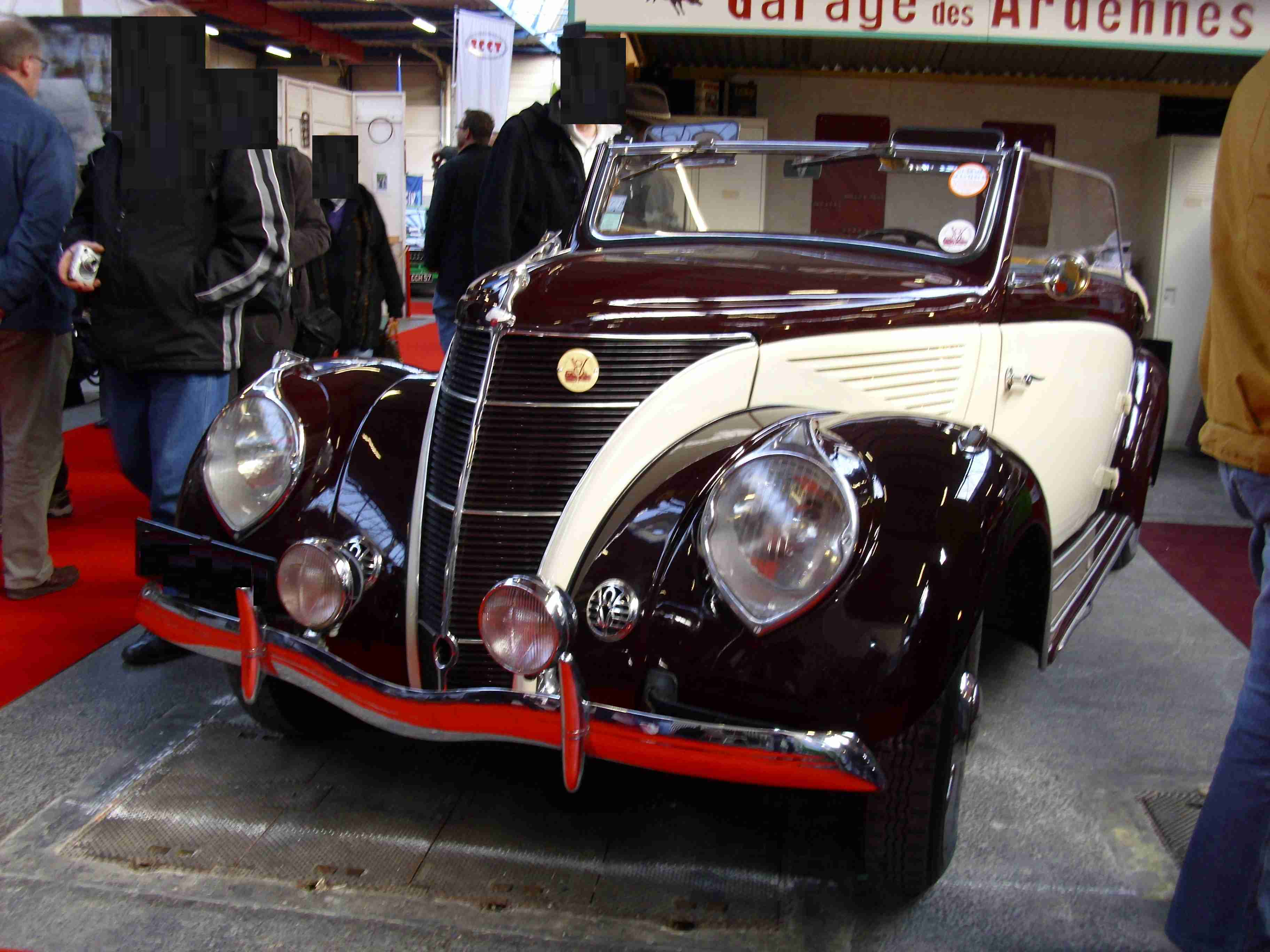
Matford 1939

=== Ford and Matford ===
Automobiles Ford S.A. Française's operations became uneconomic with the sudden erection of tariff barriers in 1932 against imported components, mainly from Britain. Ford and Mathis entered protracted and uncomfortable negotiations. In 1934 a joint venture of Ford and Mathis emerged (Matford SA Française, Strasbourg). Matford, which copied the style of contemporary British Ford models, soon became one of the biggest competitors - the original Mathis factory closed down in 1935. The last models featured a V-shaped windscreen. Matford ceased production in 1939.

=== Second World war ===
Émile Mathis regained his Strasbourg factory just before World War II, but by now it was clear that he would not be able to remain so close to a part of the Franco-German frontier which was expected to be a major zone of protracted conflict. Matthis, as an Alsatian, had been conscripted into the German army during the First World War but in 1916 had deserted from the German army (with a large amount of cash) while on a mission to buy trucks in Switzerland, and had then joined the French army. French defeat in June 1940 therefore found Émile Mathis high on the "wanted" list of the victorious Germans, but he was careful to get away in time and spent the rest of war in the United States with his company Matam.

The plant at Poissy that opened in 1940 was not a Matford plant but a Ford of France plant, although the Ford 472A produced in it was little changed from the prewar Matford joint venture product.

=== Post-war ===
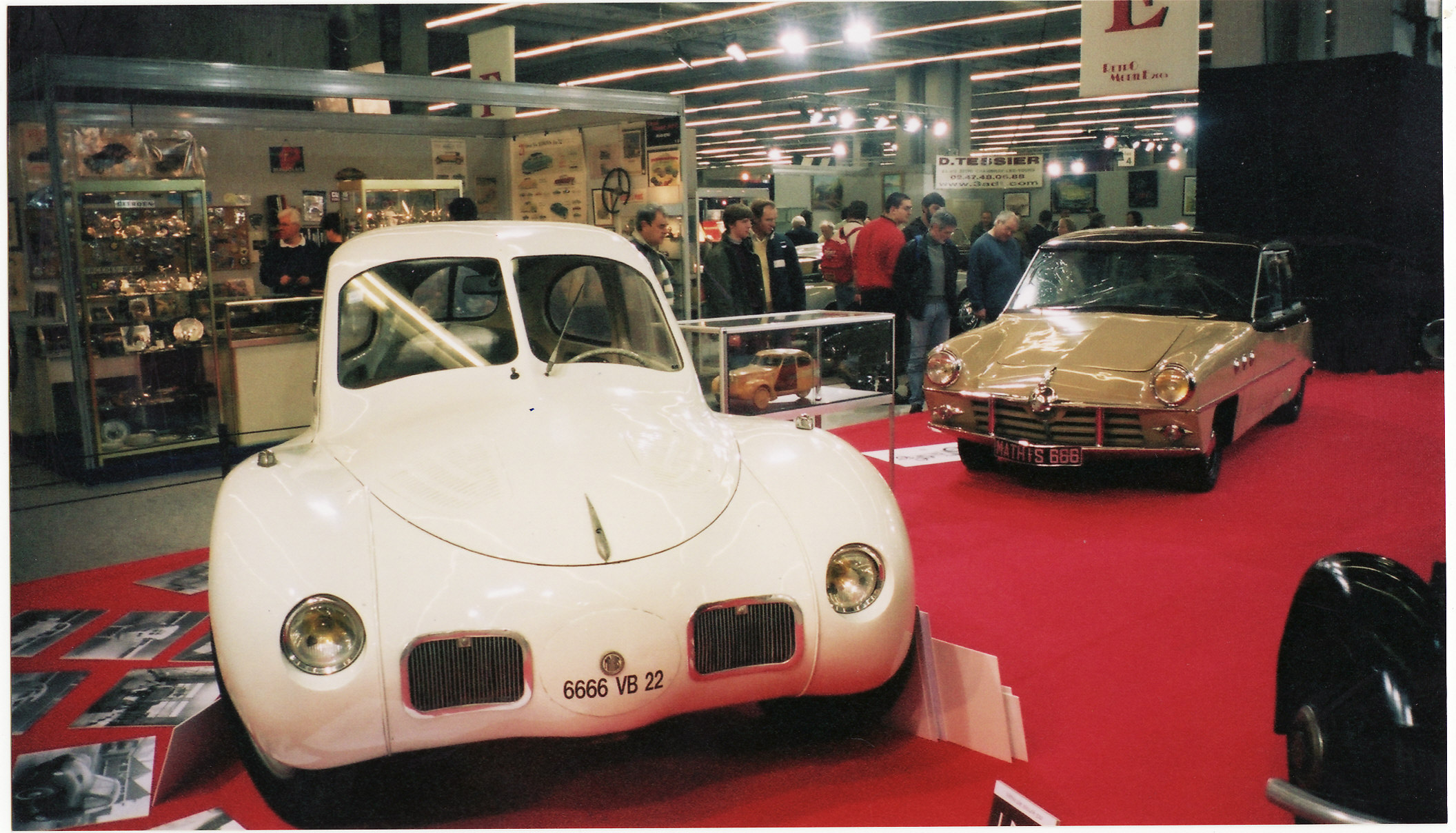
1945 VL 333 prototype by Andreau

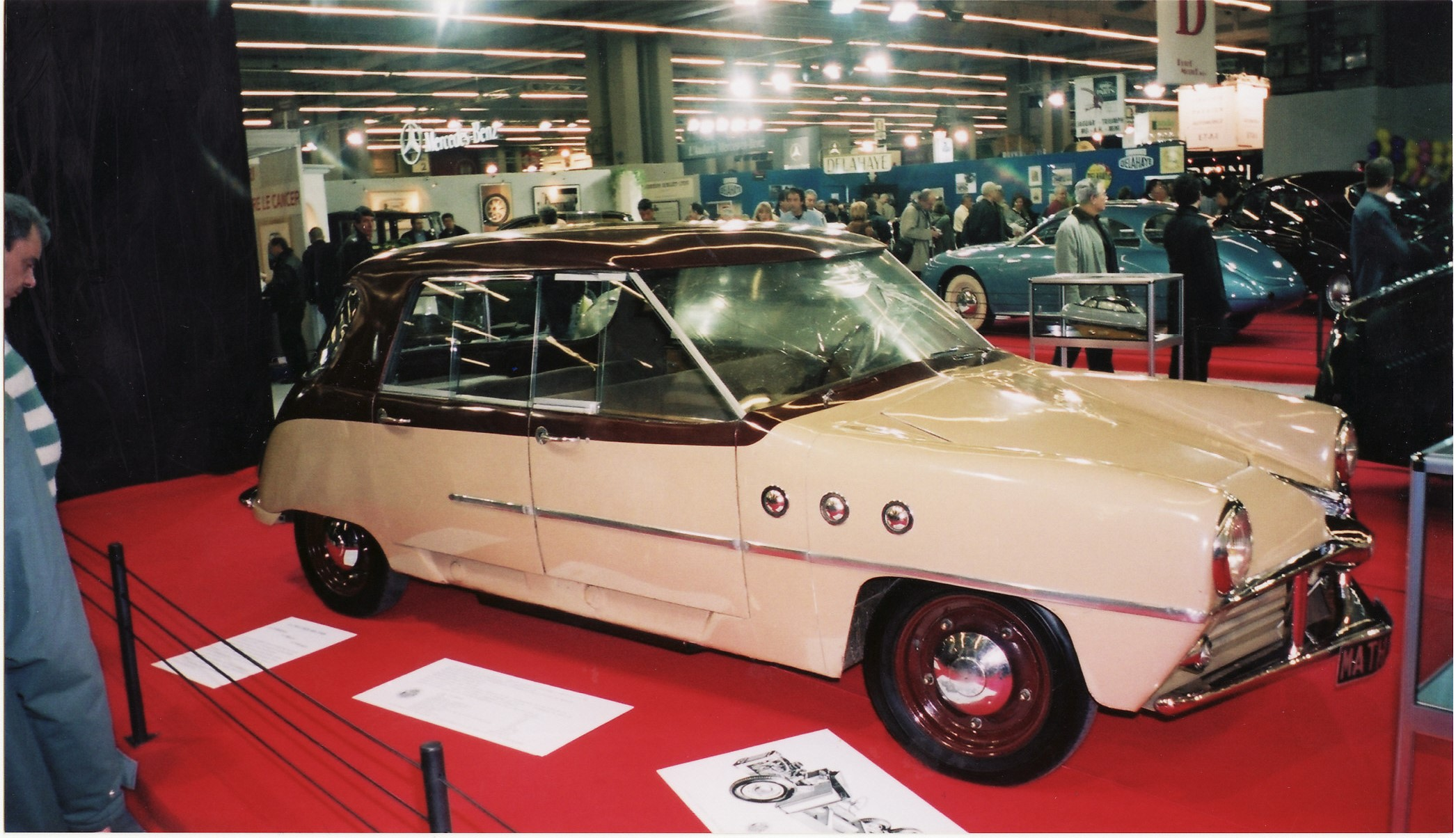
1949 VL 666 prototype

Mathis was left with his Strasbourg plant which was still relatively new but which had been largely destroyed by bombing. Mathis concentrated, initially, on rebuilding the plant, and this project seems to have been more or less completed by 1948.

Having spent the war in United States, Mathis was not well connected with the post-Vichy political class. After the war the company was not one of the automakers included in the Pons Plan. The Pons Plan reflected government determination to structure the French auto-industry according to priorities identified by politicians and civil servants: exclusion from it created great difficulties in obtaining necessary permissions and materials. Nevertheless, Mathis tried to find new projects: these included the "flattened egg-shaped" 700 cc three-wheeler (Mathis VL333) first exhibited in 1945. When this failed to find favour with the authorities he switched tack, producing a front-wheel drive prototype with a flat-six (2.8 L) engine, and an eyecatching "panoramic" style windscreen. These post-war projects failed, and the factory was only kept going by making engines for light aircraft and components for Renault. The Mathis company closed in 1950.

== Aero-engines ==
Mathis introduced a range of aero-engines intended for the Post-war light aircraft industry but few designs evolved past the prototype stage, with the notable exception of the Mathis G4. Mathis aero-engines that reached production, prototype or advanced design stages are listed here:

- Mathis G4
- Mathis G4R
- Mathis G7
- Mathis G7R
- Mathis G8
- Mathis G8R
- Mathis G14R
- Mathis G14RS
- Mathis Vesta 42
- Mathis Vesta 42B
- Mathis Vesta 42E
- Mathis 175H

The plant was eventually bought by Citroën in 1954. Émile Mathis died in Geneva, 3 August 1956.

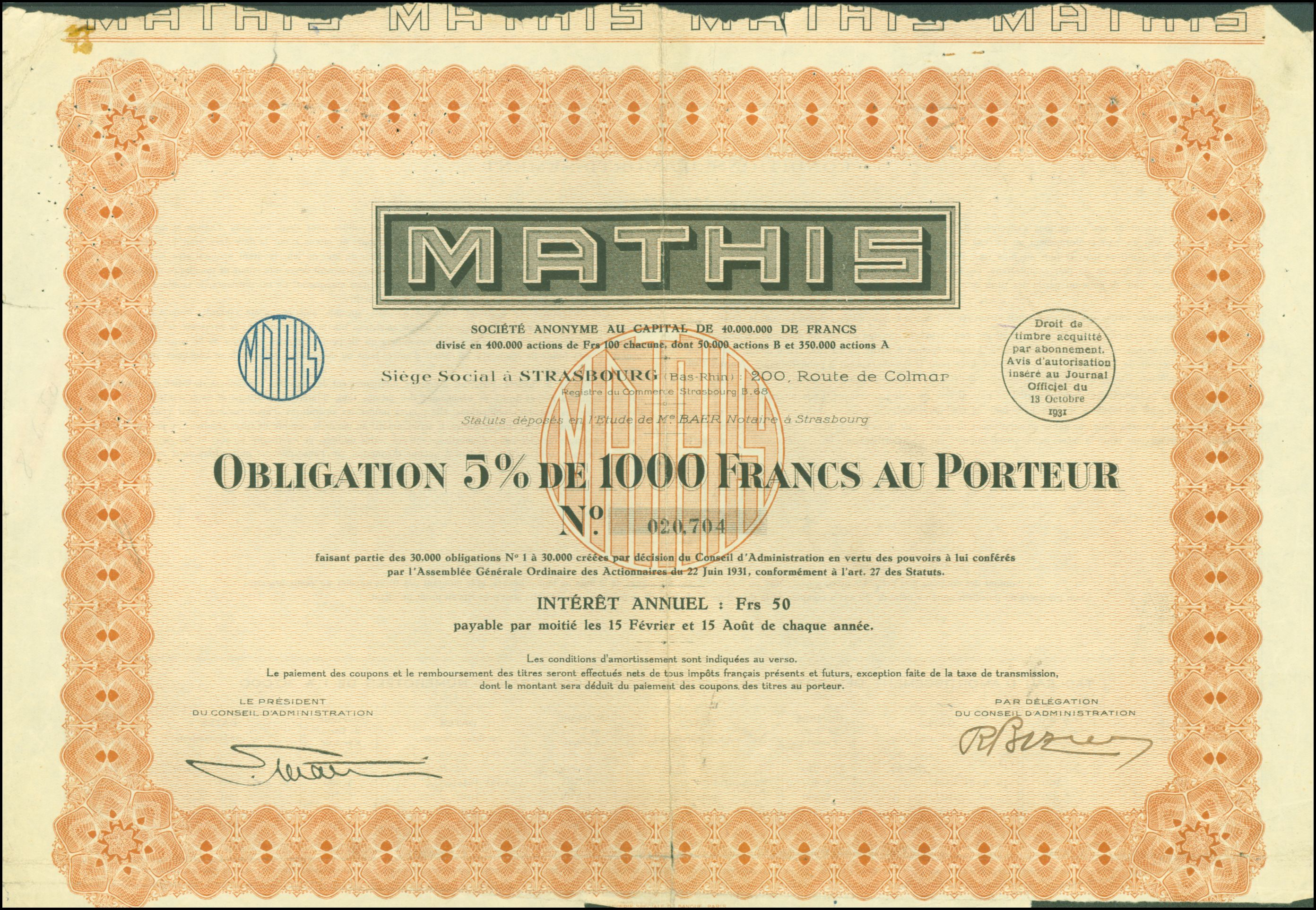
Bearer Bond issued October 1931
