= Ford SAF =

Automobile manufacturer

Ford France
- Formerly: Ford SAF (1916–1954)
- Type: Subsidiary
- Industry: Automotive
- Founded: 1916; 110 years ago
- Founder: Percival Perry
- Fate: Closed as manufacturer in 1954, continued as an importer
- Headquarters: Nanterre, France
- Parent: Ford Motor Co.
- Website: ford.fr

Ford France (formerly, Ford SAF, Ford Société Anonyme Française) is the French subsidiary of the American automaker Ford Motor Company, which existed as a manufacturer under various names between 1916 and 1954, when Ford sold the manufacturing business to Simca.

After 1954 the residuum was renamed "Ford France" and became an importer of models such as the British-built Ford Anglia and the West German-built Ford Taunus.

== Automobiles Ford (1916–1934) ==
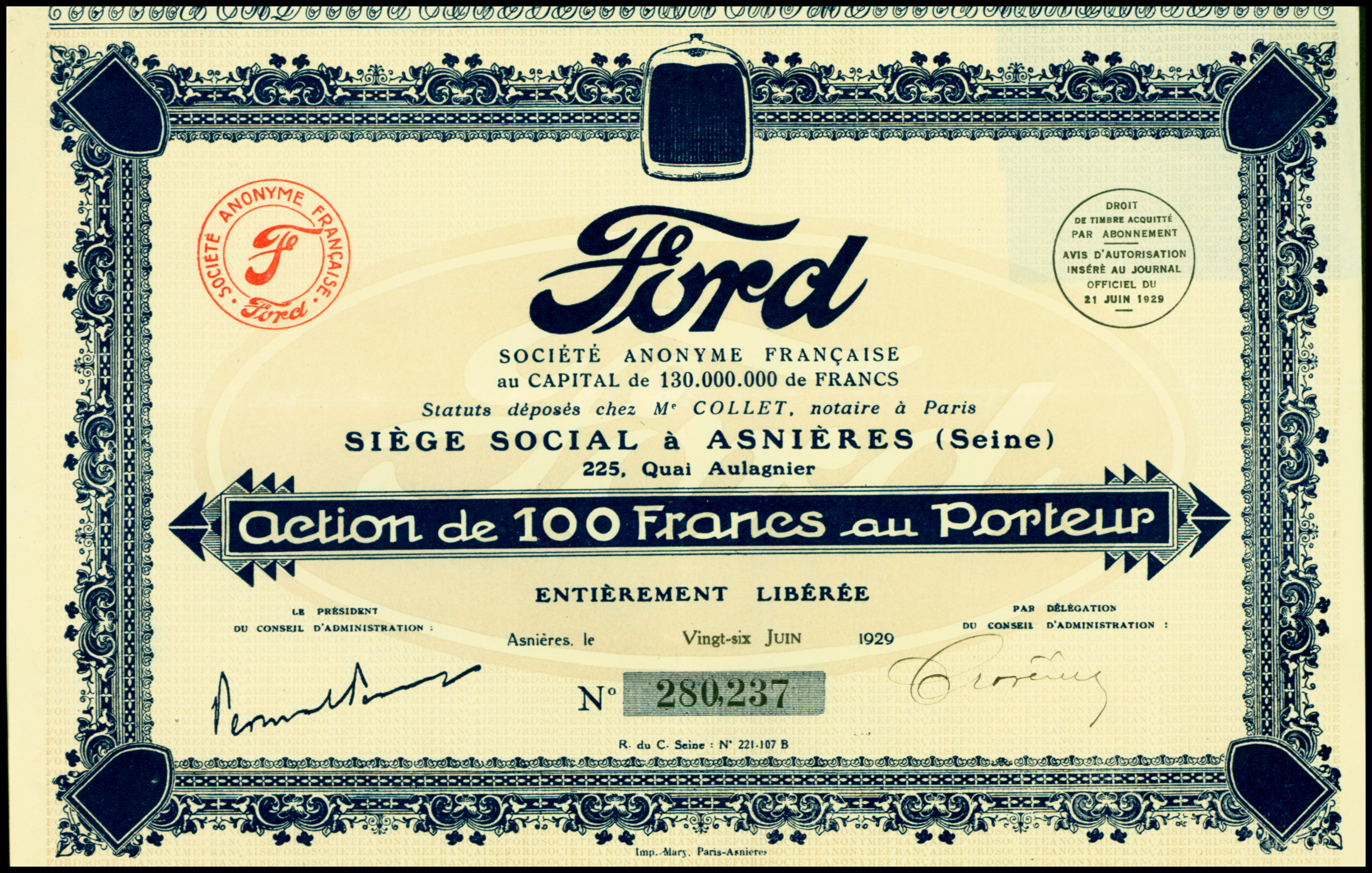
Share of the Ford S. A. Française, issued 21. June 1929

The company was formed in Bordeaux as Société Française des Automobiles Ford in 1916 by Percival Perry, the head of Ford of Britain. Like other European Ford subsidiaries, Automobiles Ford initially assembled the Ford Model T and this continued at Bordeaux until 1925 and then at a workshop in the quai Aulagnier in Asnières-sur-Seine near Paris until 1927.

Model As were made from 1927 to 1931 and Model Ys from 1932 to 1934. The company also imported the US-built V8-powered Ford Model B, but import taxes made them very expensive and so not very popular in France.

== Matford (1933–1942) ==
In 1934 Maurice Dollfus, the head of Ford Société Anonyme Française (SAF), was looking for a larger manufacturing plant and reached an agreement with Emile Mathis to enter into a joint venture with the Mathis company forming Matford in Strasbourg and Asnières. The new company name was Matford SA. Ownership was split 60%/40% with Ford having the larger share. The new company was controlled directly by Dearborn which was important to Maurice Dollfus, the president of Ford France, who was keen to avoid finding himself reporting to Percival Perry, President of Ford of Britain in Dagenham, England.

Relations between Mathis and Ford became difficult during the later 1930s with Ford, as the majority investor in the Matford partnership, insisting that development and production of the by now aging Mathis model range be discontinued.

Ford had commissioned a new plant of its own at Poissy in 1937, with the stated intention of pulling out of the Strasbourg based Matford project. By the time the Poissy plant came on line in 1940, France had been invaded. Poissy itself was occupied by German troops on 14 June 1940. Ford's new plant there would spend its first years controlled by German automakers operating from Ford’s Cologne plant. Production was dedicated primarily to trucks and military vehicles, initially using existing French designs. After 1943 the plant began assembling "German" Fords for Cologne. Meanwhile, a small number of 13CV Matford V8 passenger cars, now branded as Fords, continued to be produced, at least until 1942.

== Ford SAF (1945–1954) ==
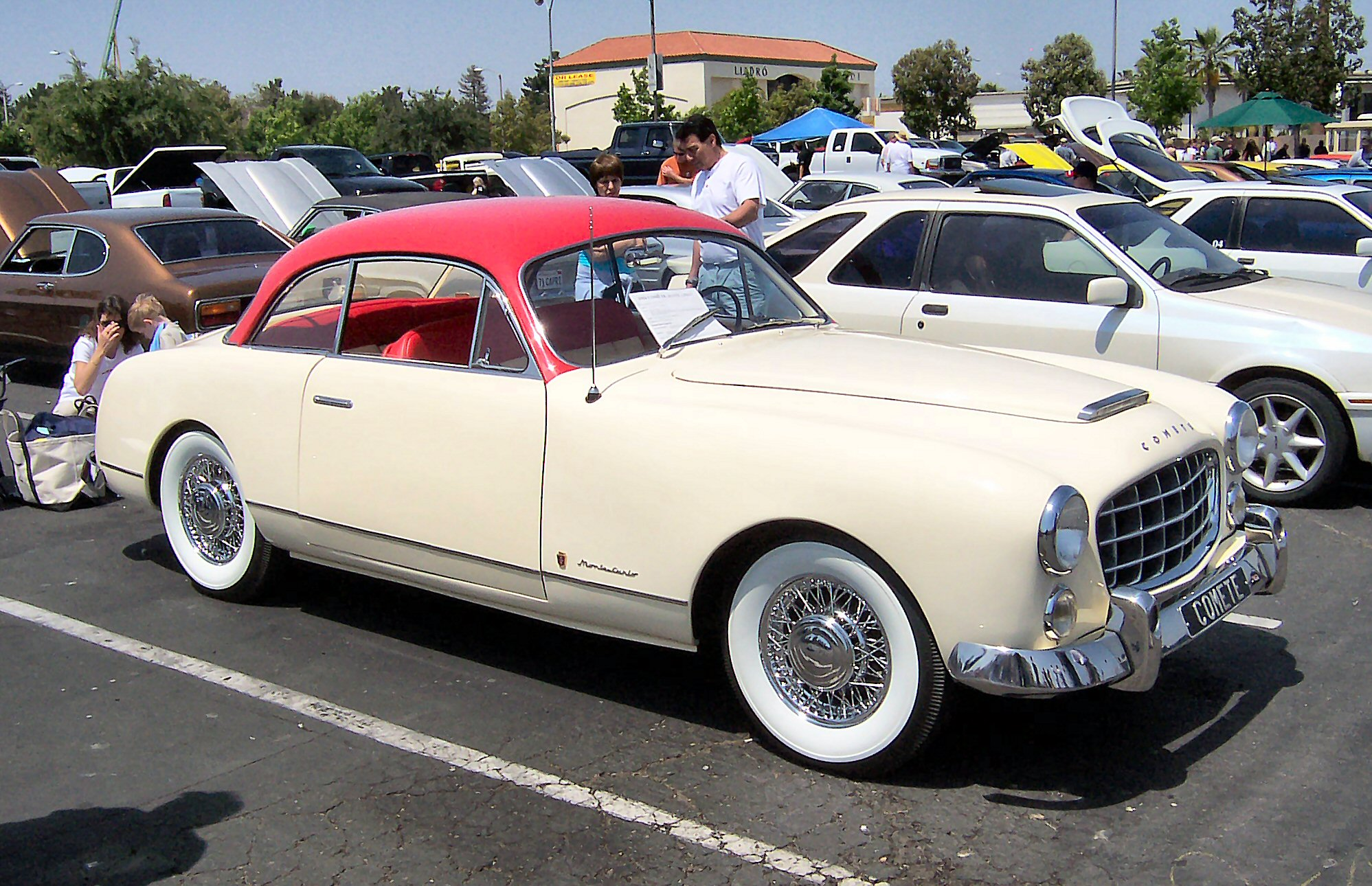
The two-door V8 Ford Comète, launched in 1954, never achieved commercial success in its home market as the taxation system penalised cars with engines larger than two litres

After the war the company re-introduced the smaller 2,225 cc V8-engined Matford model, but it no longer carried the Matford name. The car was known in France as the Ford 13CV, although subsequently it is also called more formally the Ford F-472 and, after the first 300 had been produced, the Ford F-472A. The car’s handling had been criticised in the 1930s, and vehicles produced from 1946 benefitted from anti-roll bars at both ends as well as hydraulic brakes, which combined to make it easier to control through corners. In addition to the familiar four-door sedan/saloon, chassis with front half bodies were also made available to coachbuilders, who built a number of coupé, cabriolet and station wagon adaptations. The 13CV was valued by customers for its interior space, comfort, style and performance. However the car’s fuel consumption also put it at a competitive disadvantage against the market leading Citroën 11CV. That coupled with a post-war France tax policy intended to heavily discourage cars with engine sizes above 2-litres put a damper on sales.

In 1947 the company produced 3,023 of its 13CVs, which in 1948 increased to 4,270 units. The Citroën was far more plentiful, as it was being produced at more than three times the 1948 production rate of the 13CV. These production volumes were far below those envisaged when the Poissy plant was planned, and ever since the end of the war Ford’s French boss, Maurice Dollfus had been negotiating with US Management to be permitted to adapt a prototype developed in Dearborn in 1941. This model, launched in October at the 1948 Paris Motor Show as the Ford 12CV Vedette now replaced the F-472A. The Vedette was joined in 1952 by its upmarket counterparts, the Vendôme, and Comète sports coupé, cars that were not shared with any other Ford subsidiary. In November 1954 Ford merged the entire French operation to Simca at first keeping 15.2 per cent of the company but selling this share as well in 1958. Apart from the plant, Simca also acquired plans for a new Vedette, with the 2351 cc V8, which was made until 1961 (with a substantial modernisation for 1958) as Simca Vedette (although still marketed in some markets as Ford for some time).

The Poissy factory has an interesting later history - after the incorporation of Ford SAF into Simca, it was also a subject of Simca's takeover by Chrysler in the 1960, and during the 1970s it manufactured the first (and, as it later turned out, only) French-made car to bear the Chrysler brand, the Chrysler 180. At the end of the decade, Chrysler in turn divested its European operations (including Poissy) to PSA, which first rebranded the Poissy production to Talbot. Finally, in the second half of the 1980s, the Talbot brand was axed and Poissy became one of the most important production sites for the Peugeot brand and continues to be today.

== See also ==
- Ford France (cycling team)
