= Chausson (recreational vehicle) =

French recreational vehicle constructor

Chausson is a French recreational vehicle constructor since 1903 who are part of Groupe Trigano. The vehicles are sold in 15 European countries The vehicles are made in France. The plant at Tournon-sur-Rhône employs 835 persons. Its motorhomes are based on Ford and Fiat vehicles.

During the past, it was part of the larger Société des usines Chausson, bus manufacturer and contractor with several automobile brands.

== Gallery ==
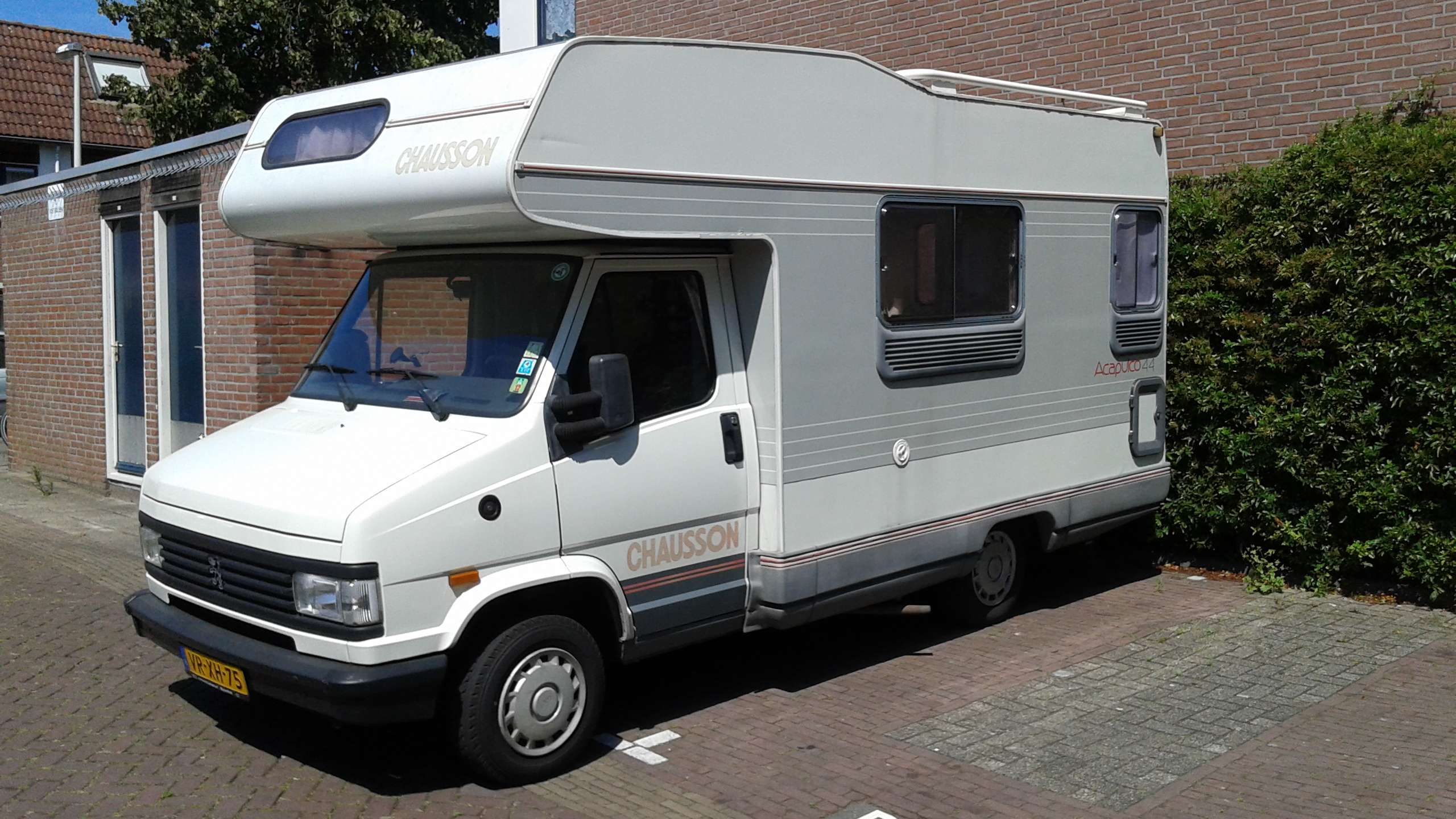
1984 Chausson Acapulco 44 Peugeot

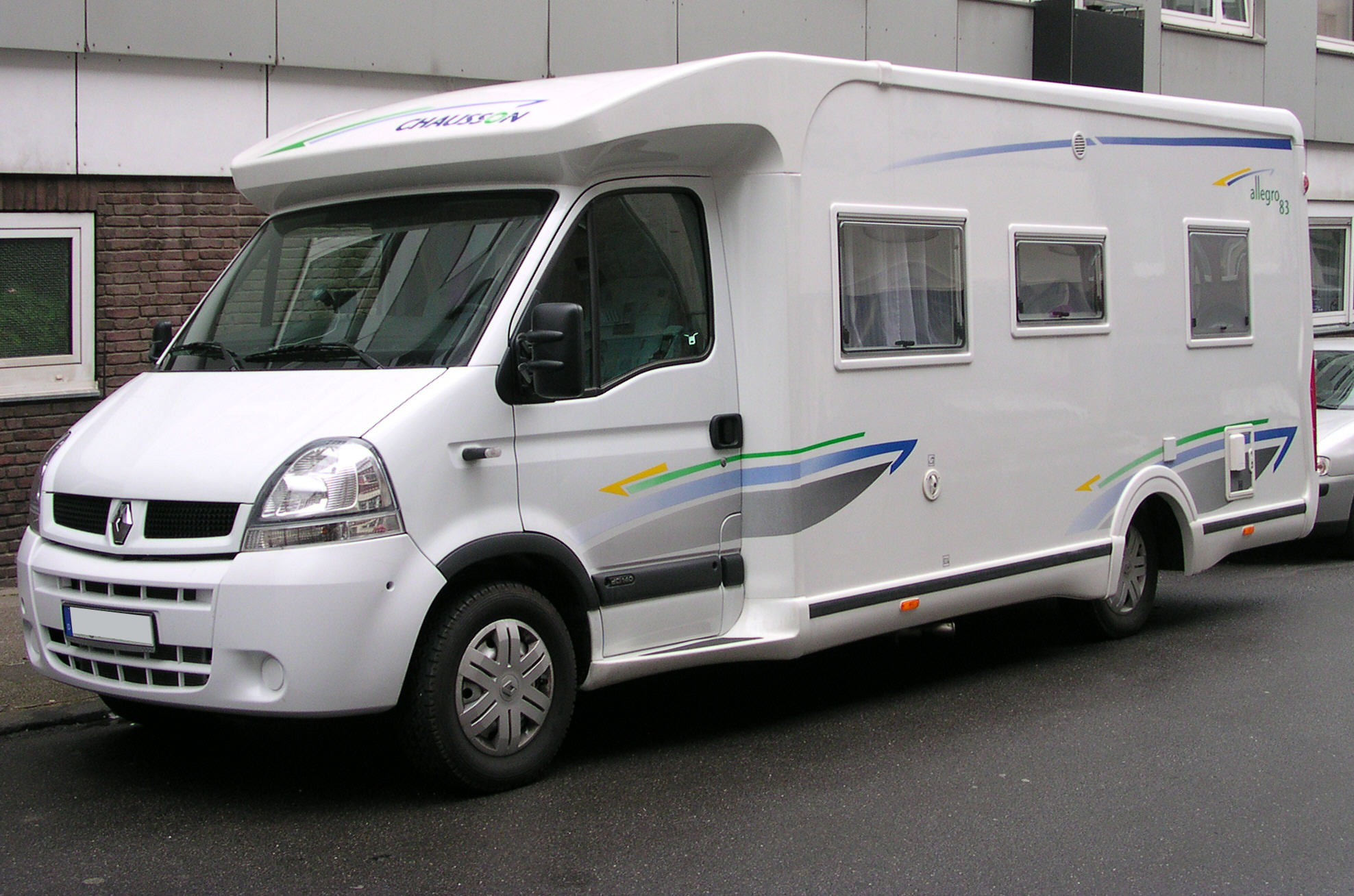
Chausson Allegro 83 Renault

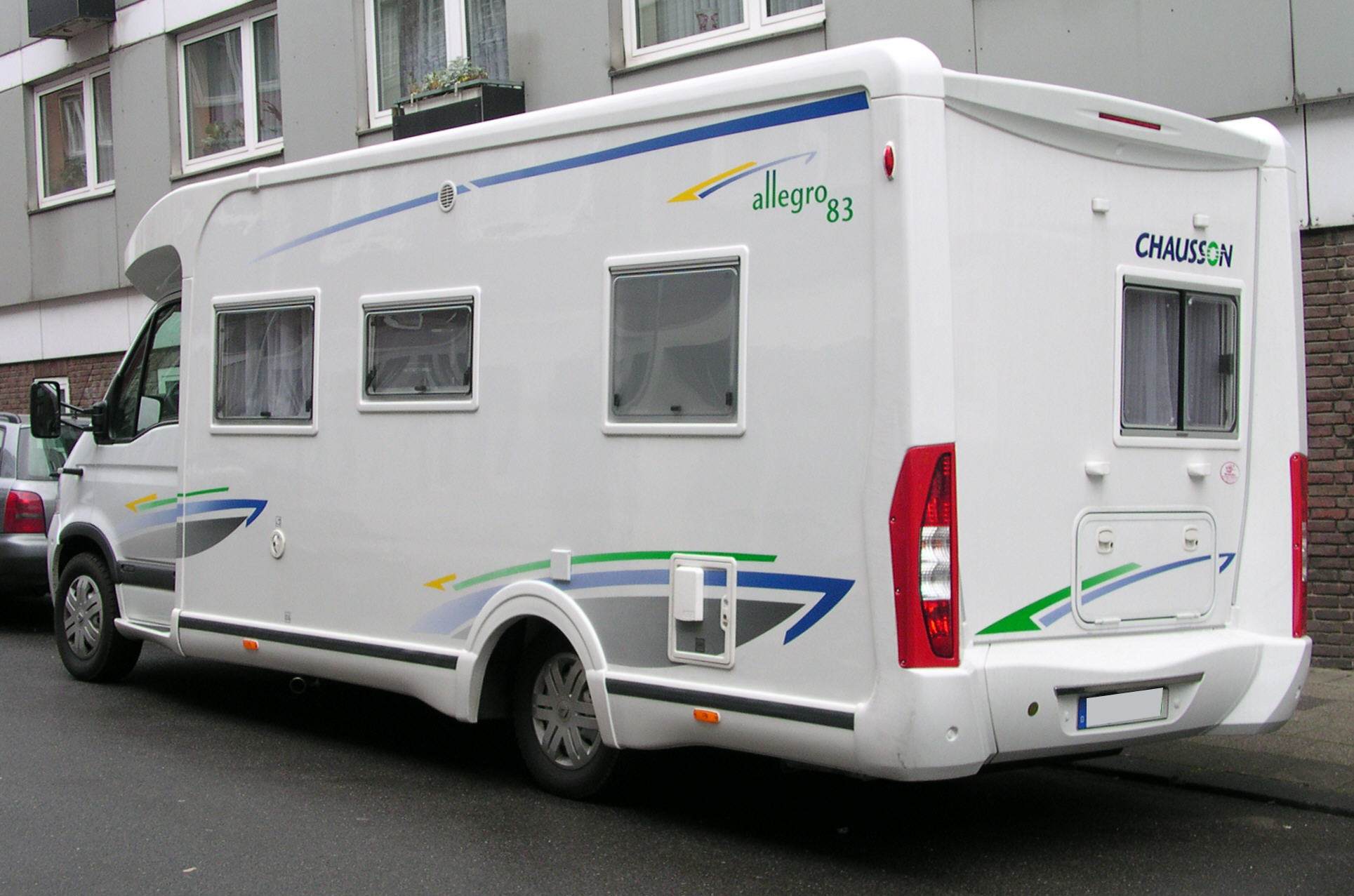
Chausson Allegro 83 Renault

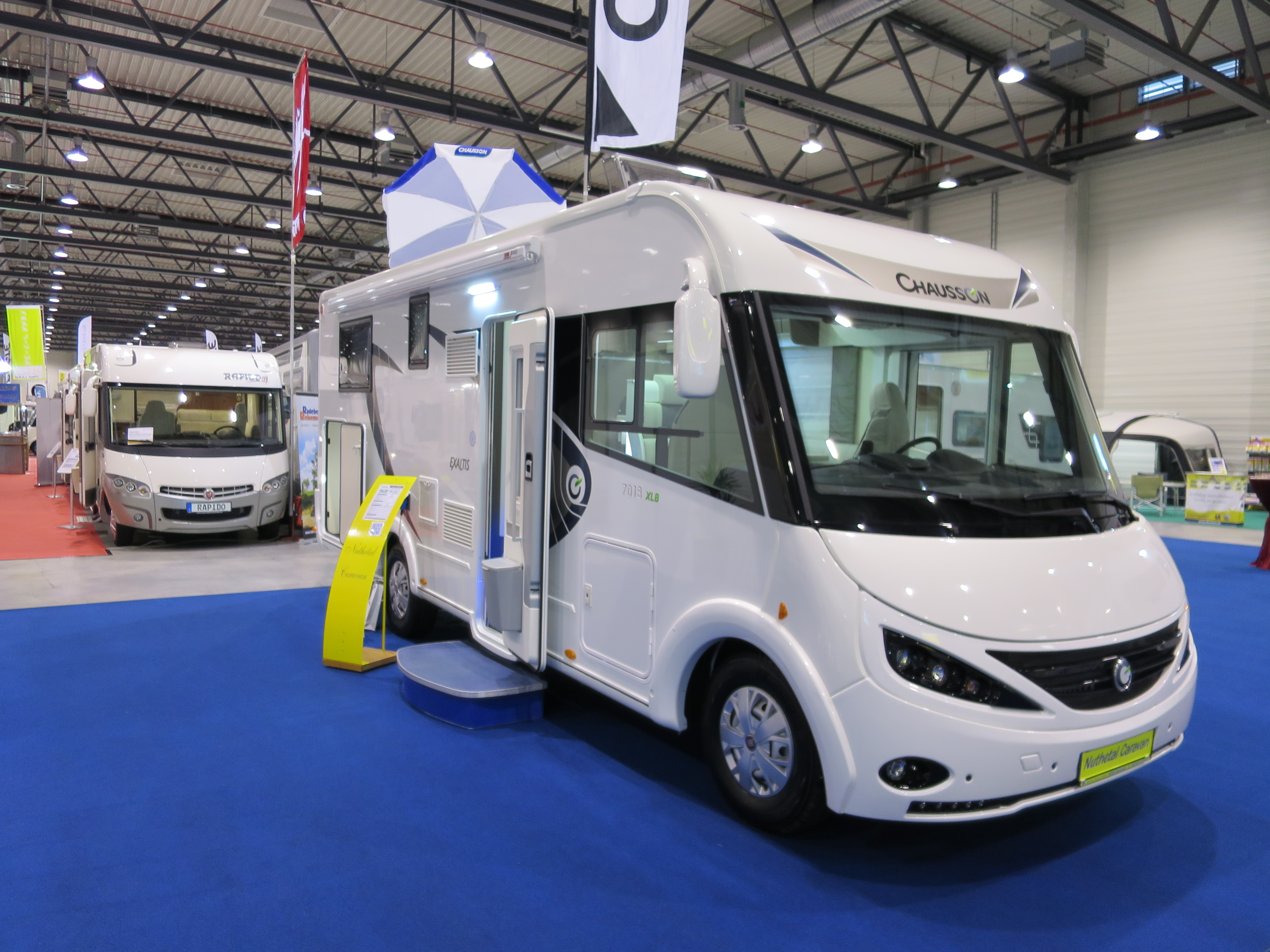
2017 Chausson Extalis
