= Telematics 2.0 =

Telematics 2.0 is the name for the Internet of things-based telematics technology for the automotive industry. Telematics 2.0 utilises smartphone-based sensors rather than the black box devices used in the traditional pay as you drive insurance industry. Telematics 2.0 solutions reached the consumer market in 2012/3 with solutions being offered by leading auto insurers such as AIG and AssetFENCE in the US.

A commercial pilot of SafeDrive was run 2013 in Sweden, where the shortcomings of the smartphone as measurement probe were handled by digital signal processing.
