= Automotive industry in France =

France was a pioneer in the automotive industry and is the 11th-largest automobile manufacturer in the world by 2015 unit production and the third-largest in Europe (after Germany and Spain). It had consistently been the 4th-largest from the end of World War II up to 2000. It is 16% of sales of French manufactured products.

France is home to two major automaking companies:

- Stellantis (owner of the Peugeot, Citroën, DS and Opel/Vauxhall marques which were originally part of the PSA Group).
- Renault Group (owner of the Renault, Alpine, Dacia marques and 43% of Nissan) the 3rd-largest automaker in Europe and the 10th-largest of the world in 2015.

Additionally, Toyota operates a factory in France for production of small-class passenger vehicles.

Lower volume French automotive manufacturers include:

- Bugatti, a luxury marque of Bugatti Rimac headquartered in Molsheim.
- Venturi, a small sports car manufacturer and Formula E team sponsor.
- Aixam and Mega, microcar marques of Polaris Industries headquartered in Aix-les-Bains.
- Microcar and Ligier, microcar marques of DrivePlanet headquartered in Abrest.

The France-based Renault Trucks is a major producer of commercial vehicles and is owned by Volvo. Both PSA and Renault produce a large number of vehicles outside France. French automotive manufacturers were long dominant in francophone Africa, but beginning in the 1970s the Japanese were making inroads due to lower prices and the availability of suitable light offroad cars and trucks.

French-designed cars have won the European Car of the Year and World Car of the Year awards numerous times. The Citroën DS took third place in Car of the Century award and has been named the most beautiful car of all time by Classic & Sports Car magazine.

== 18th and 19th centuries ==
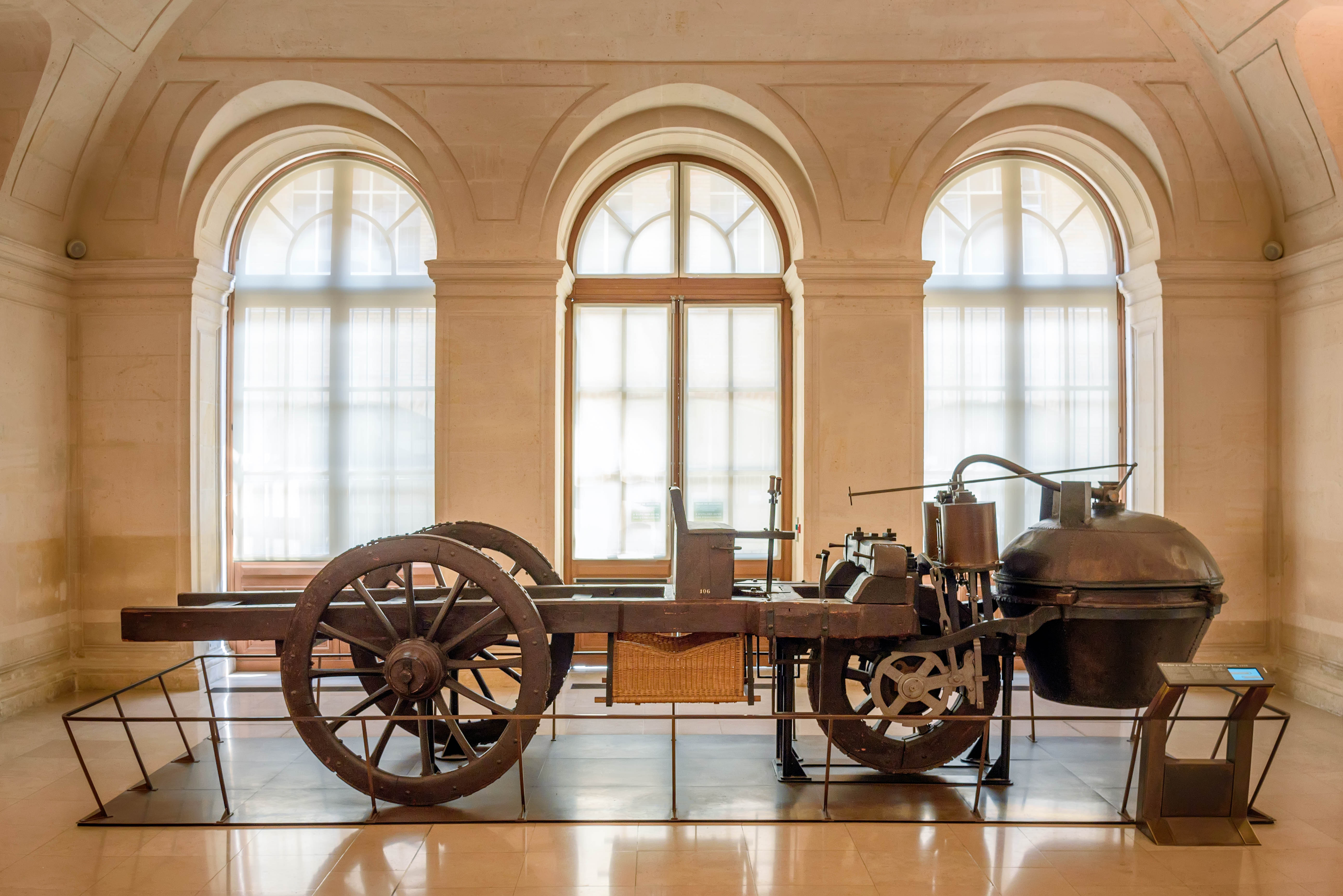
Joseph Cugnot's 1770 Fardier à Vapeur, the world's first automobile

1769 – Nicolas-Joseph Cugnot builds the first self-propelled mechanical vehicle.

1807 – François Isaac de Rivaz invents a hydrogen-powered internal combustion engine.

1859 – Jean Joseph Étienne Lenoir develops an internal combustion engine.

1884 – Edouard Delamare-Deboutteville is credited in France with building the first gasoline-powered automobile.

1885 – Amédée Bollée begins manufacturing steam-powered vehicles.

1887 – Léon Serpollet begins building steam-powered vehicles.

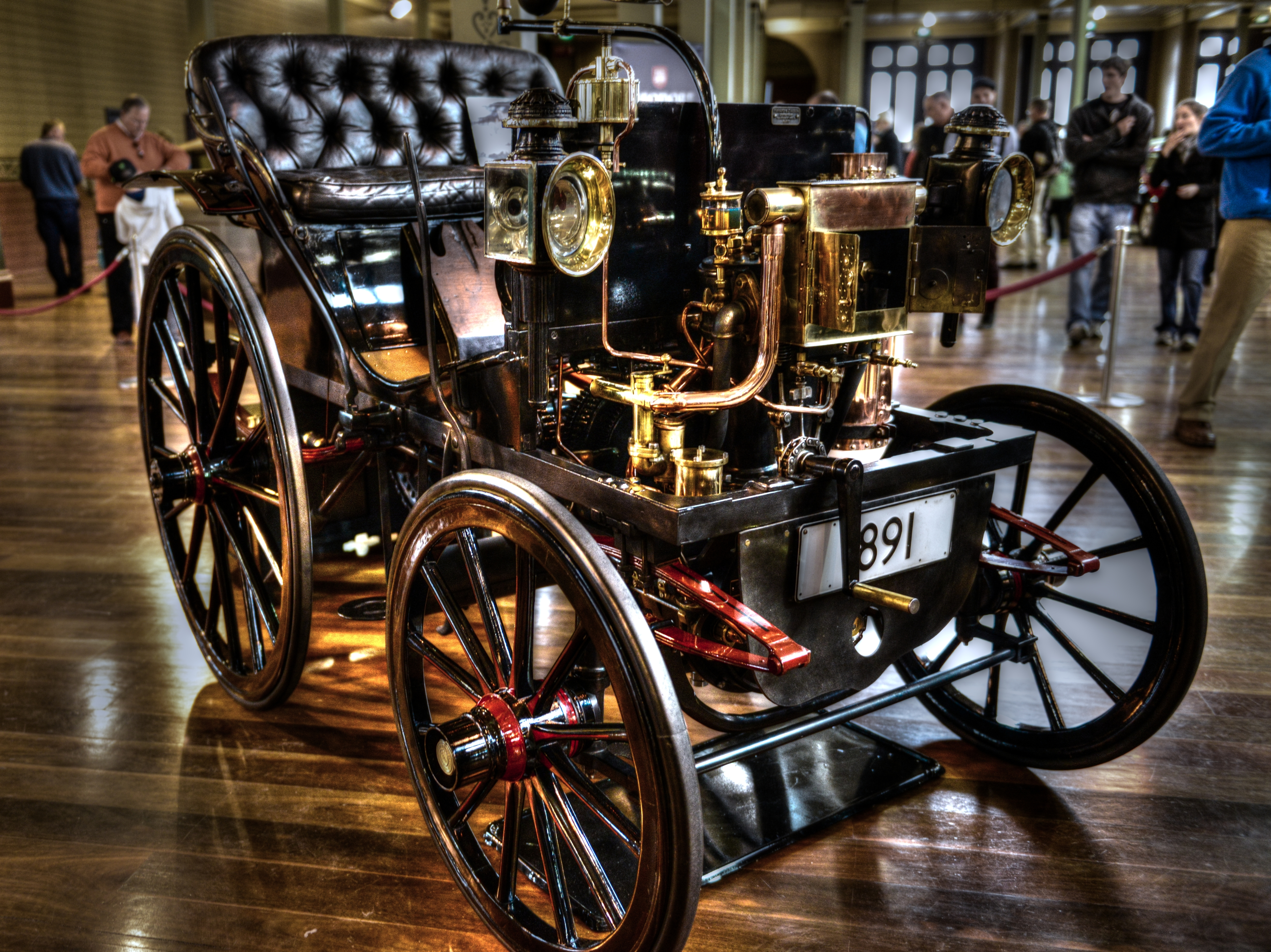
1891 Panhard & Levassor

1887 – Panhard et Levassor established as a car manufacturing concern by René Panhard and Émile Levassor, with the first car produced in 1891.

1890 – Armand Peugeot produces a four-wheeled car powered by a Daimler gasoline fueled internal combustion engine.

1894 – Albert de Dion and Georges Bouton produce a single cylinder gasoline-powered engine and in 1898 produced a four-wheeler. They had previously built steam-powered vehicles beginning in 1883.

1894 – Delahaye is founded by Emile Delahaye. The company is bought by Hotchkiss et Cie in 1954 and discontinues auto production.

1896 – Armand Peugeot starts to build and fit his own engines to his cars.

1896 – Léon Bollée builds gasoline-powered cars.

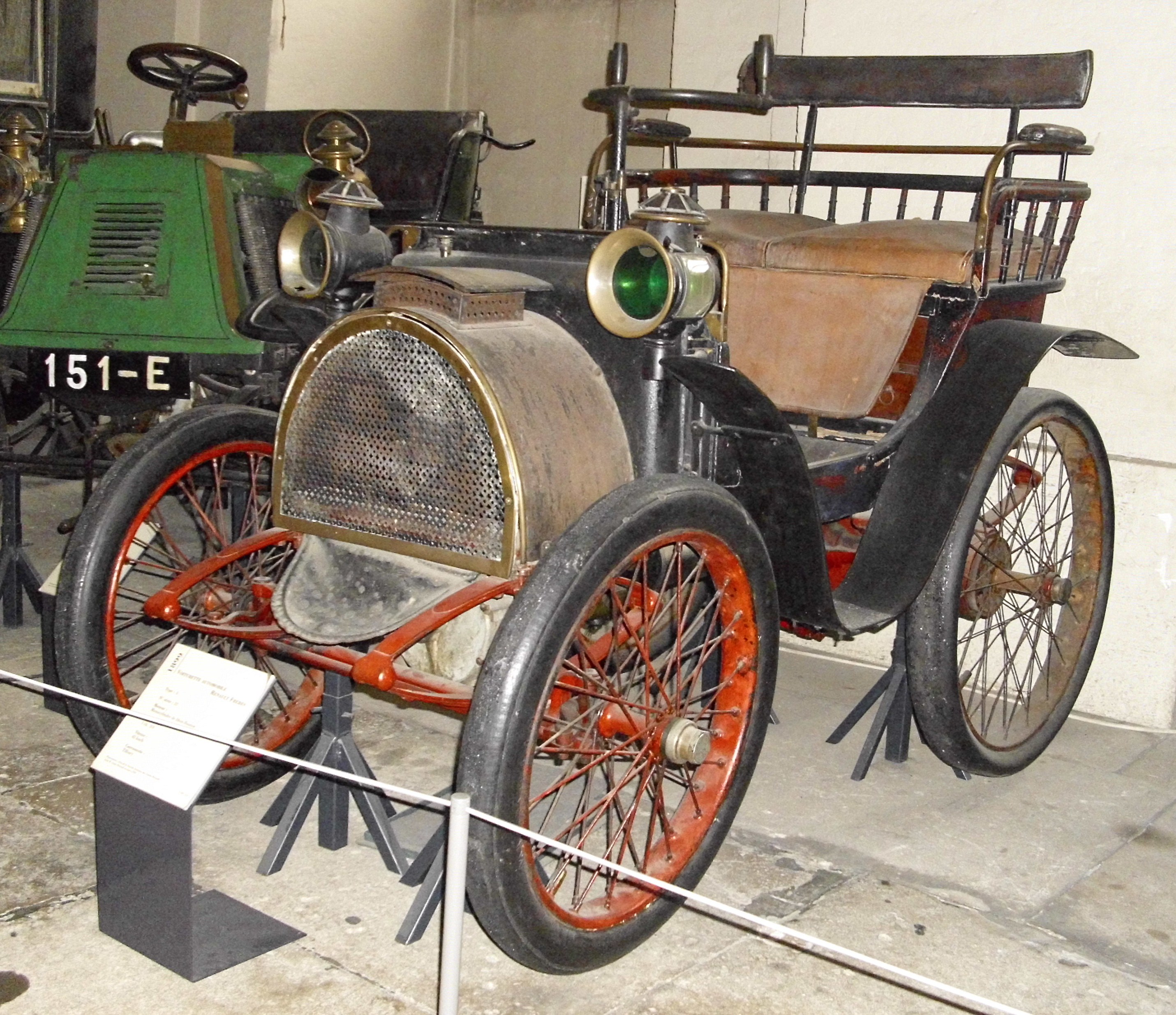
1899 Renault Type A

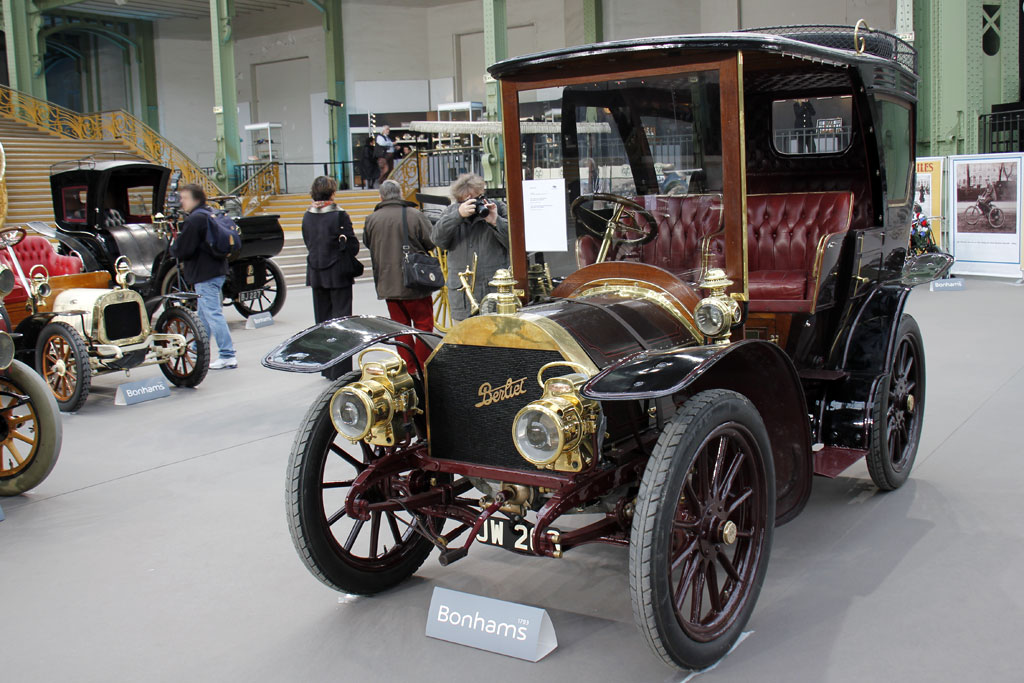
1903 Berliet 20CV Demi Limousine

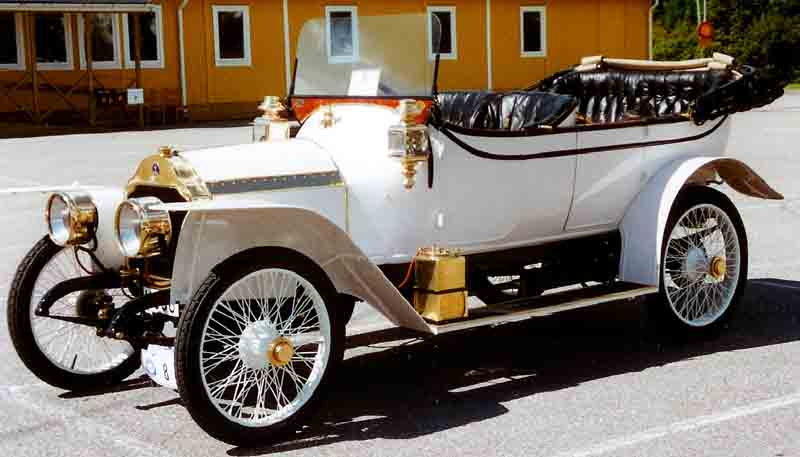
1912 Lorraine-Dietrich 12 HP Torpedo

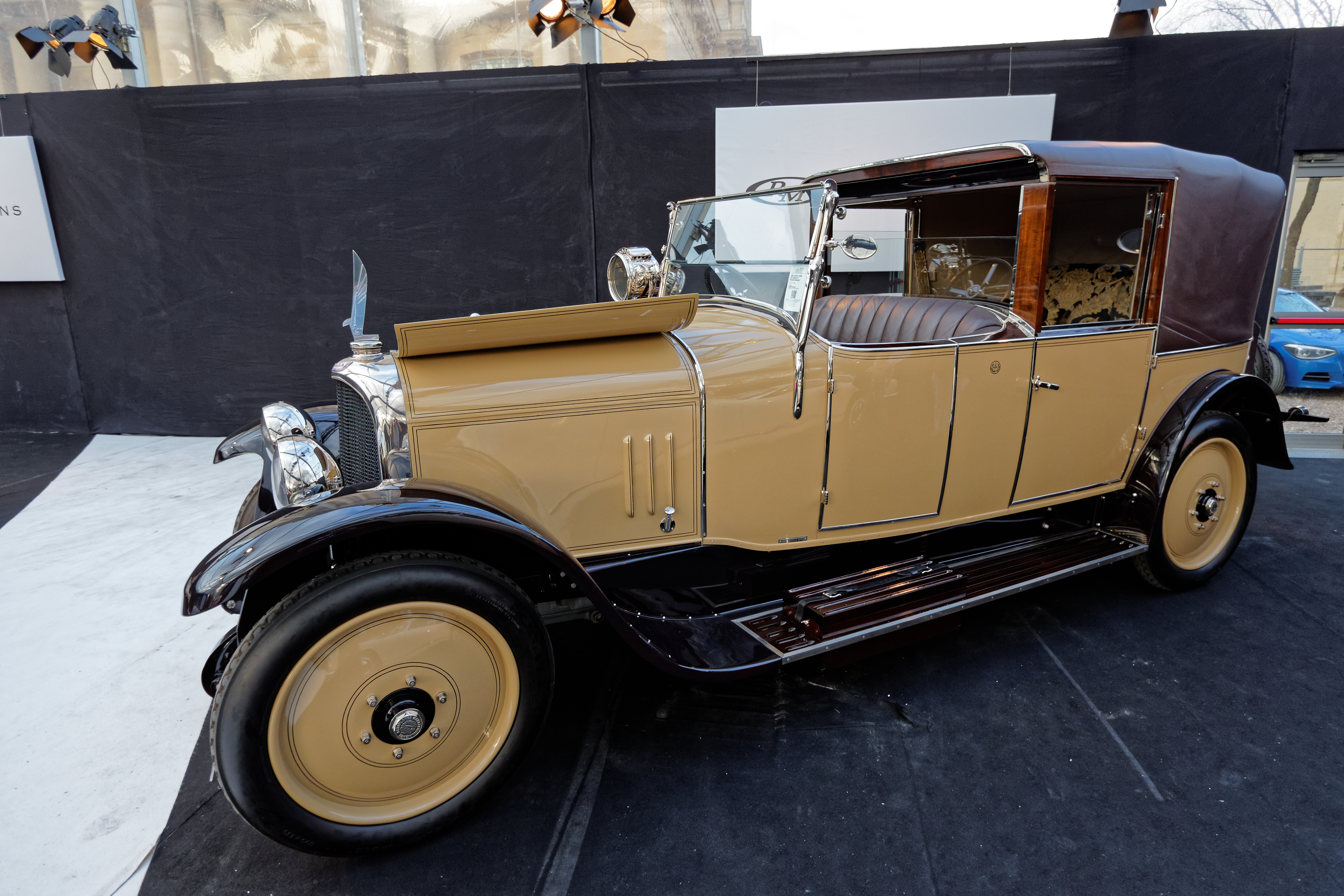
1925 Avions Voisin C3 Cabriolet Transformable

1898 – The Renault brothers, Louis, Marcel and Fernand, sell their first car.

== 1900–1950 ==
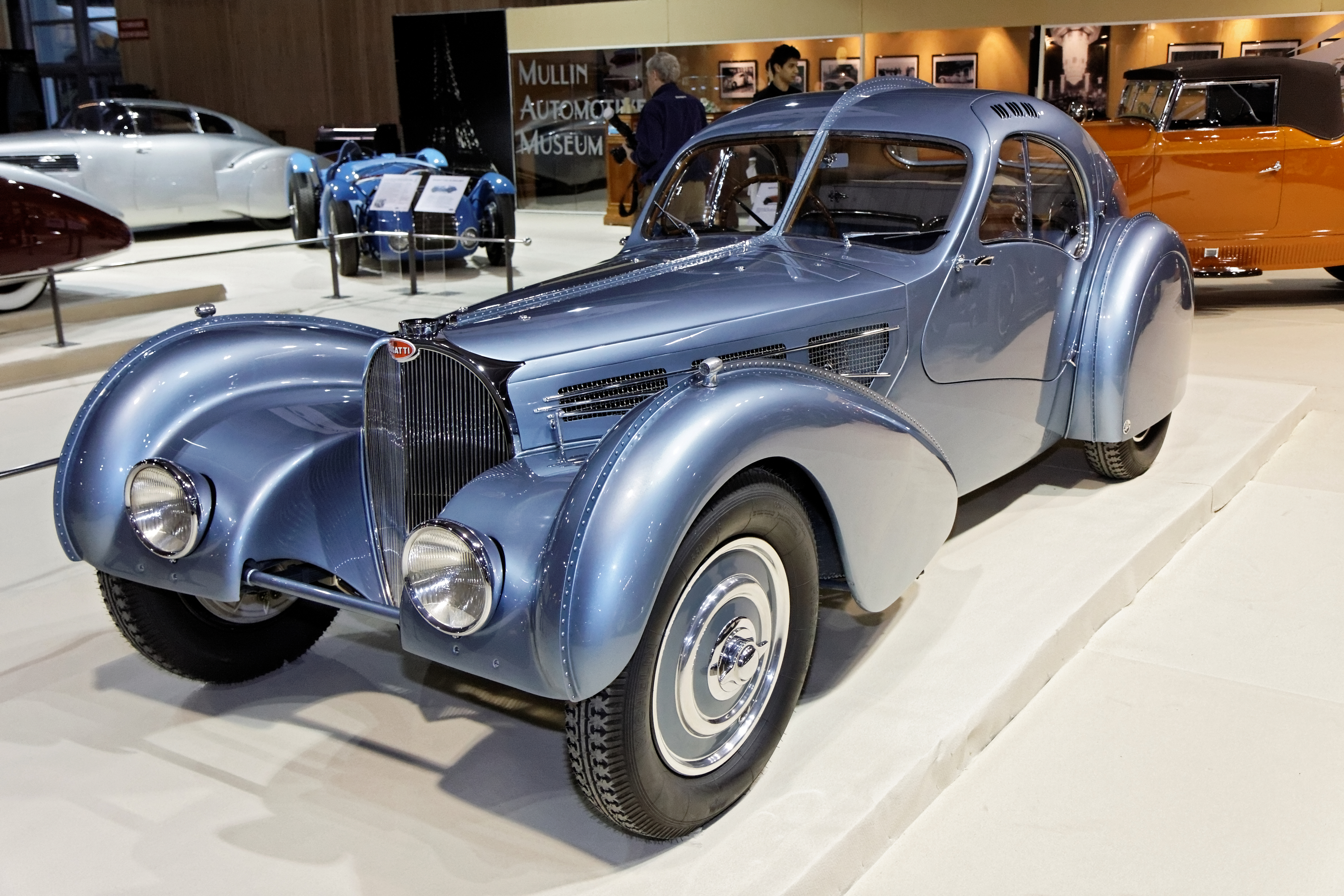
1936 Bugatti type 57SC Atlantic

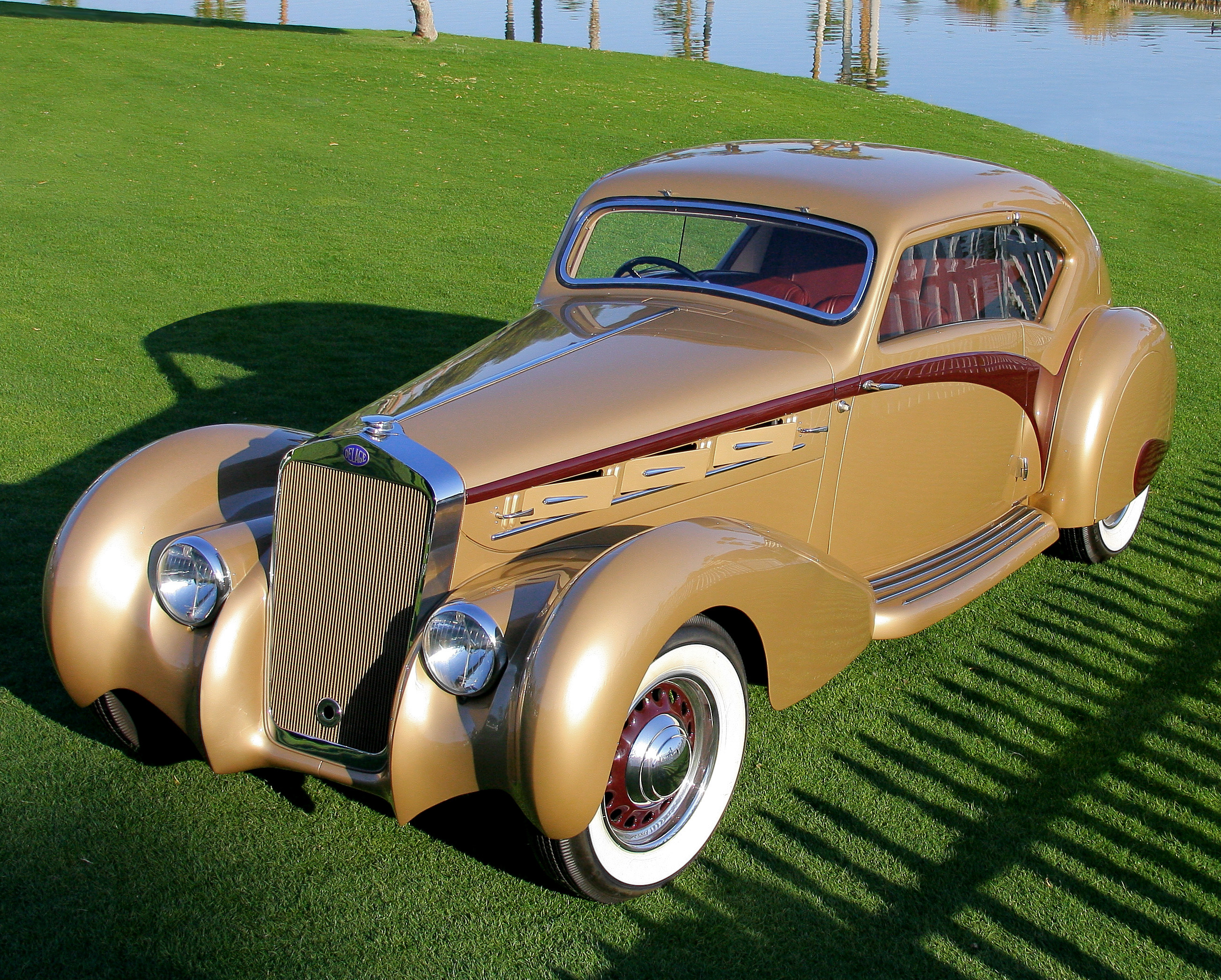
1937 Delage D8 120 Aerosport Coupe

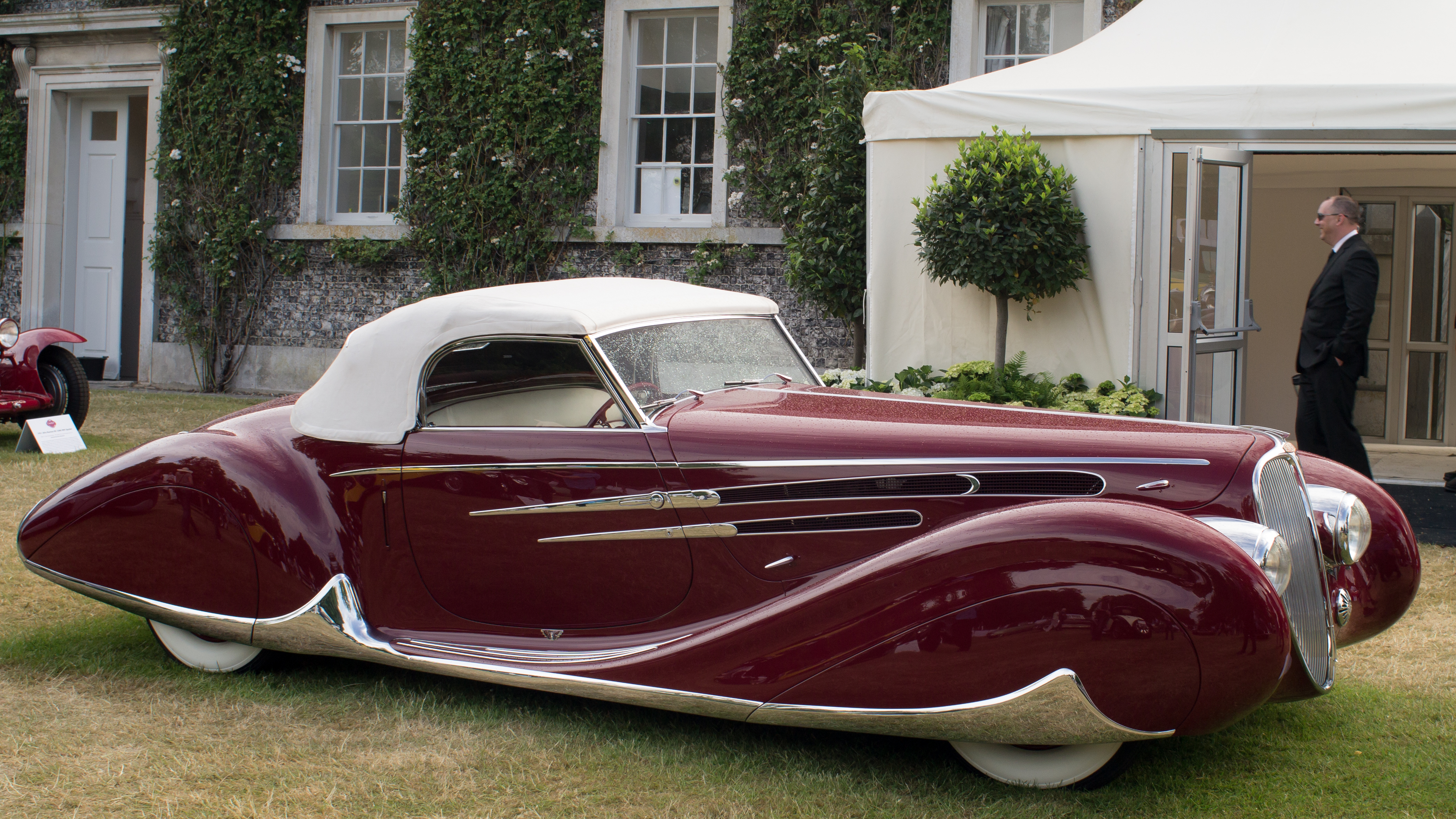
1939 Delahaye Type 165 Cabriolet

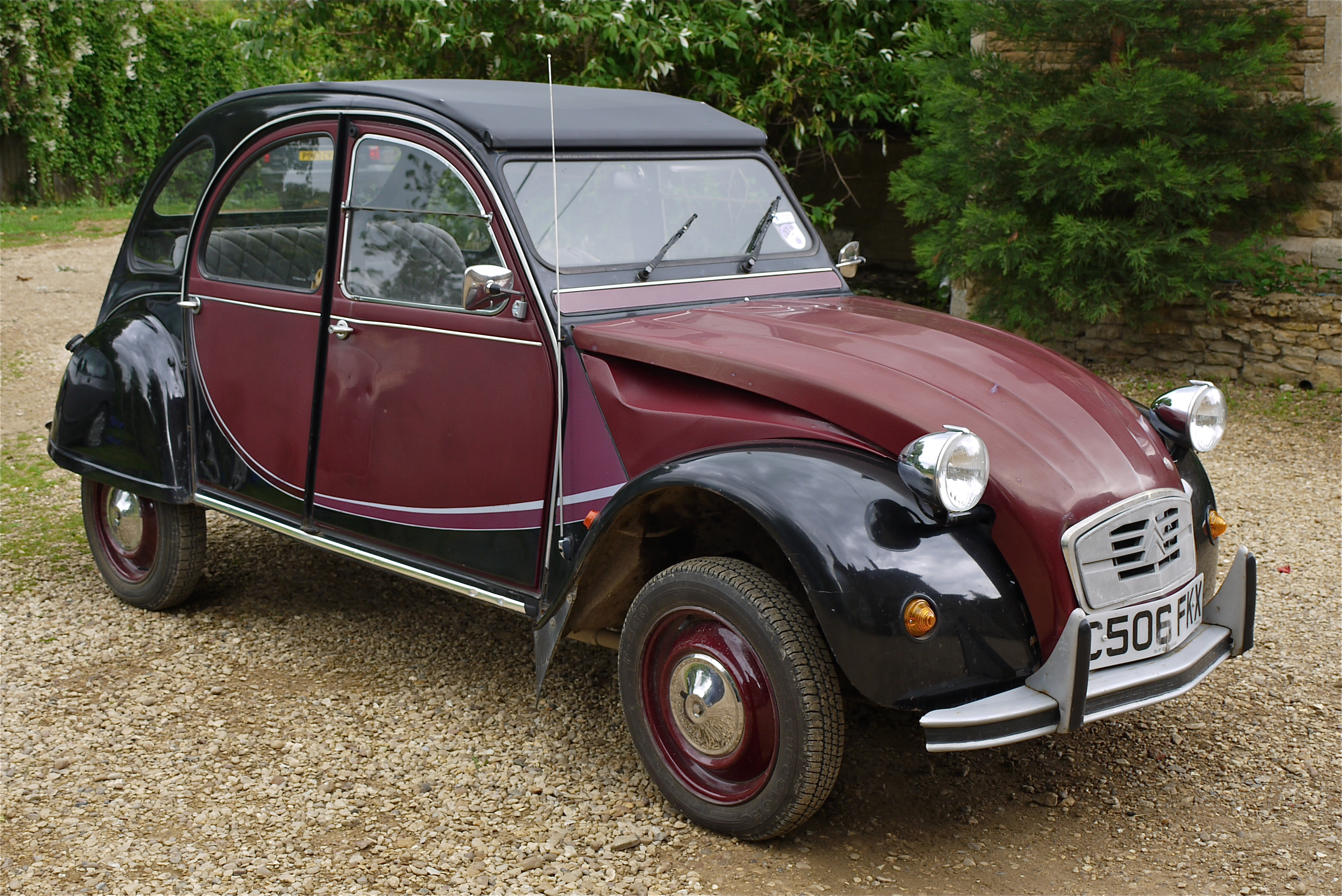
Citroën 2CV

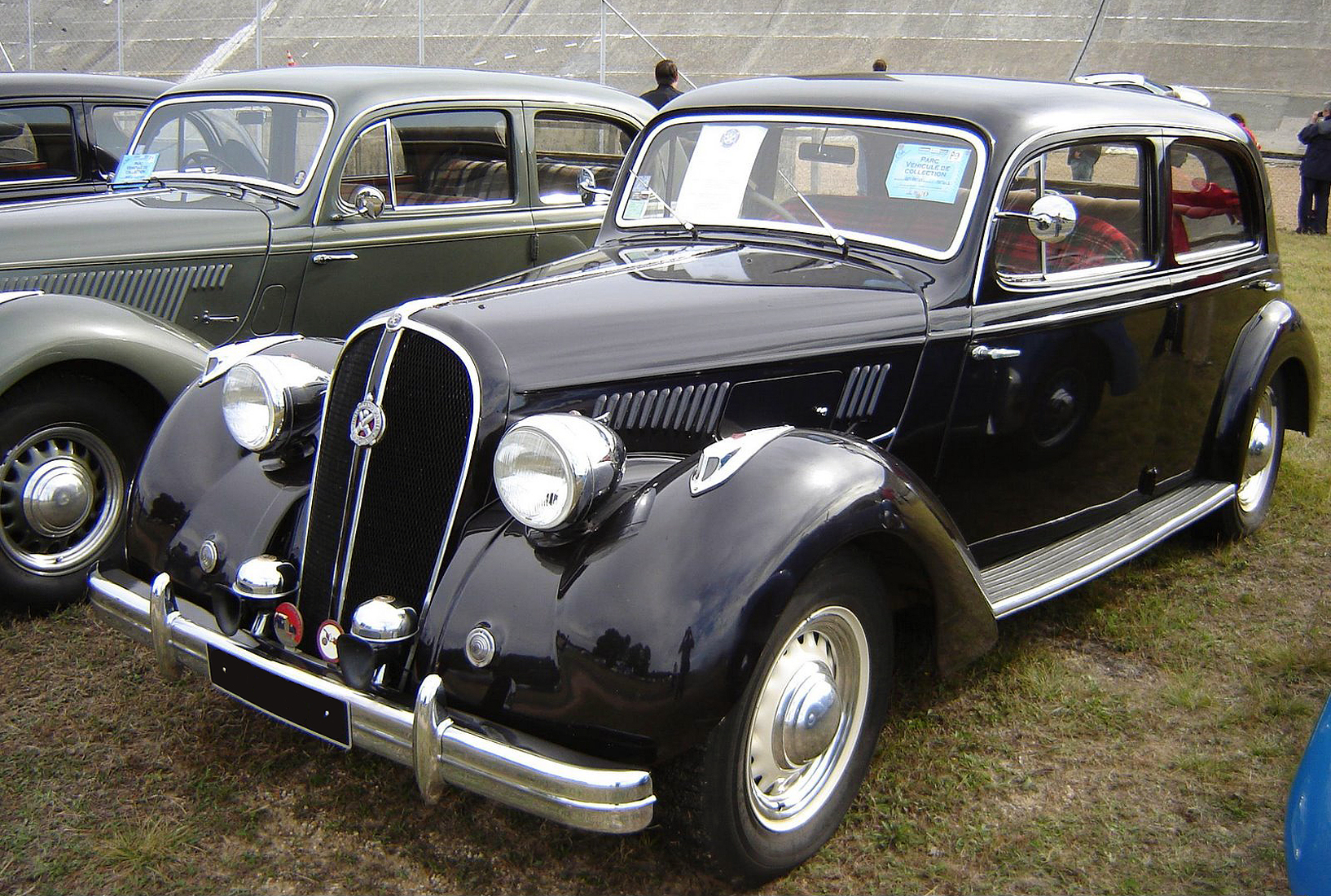
Hotchkiss Artois

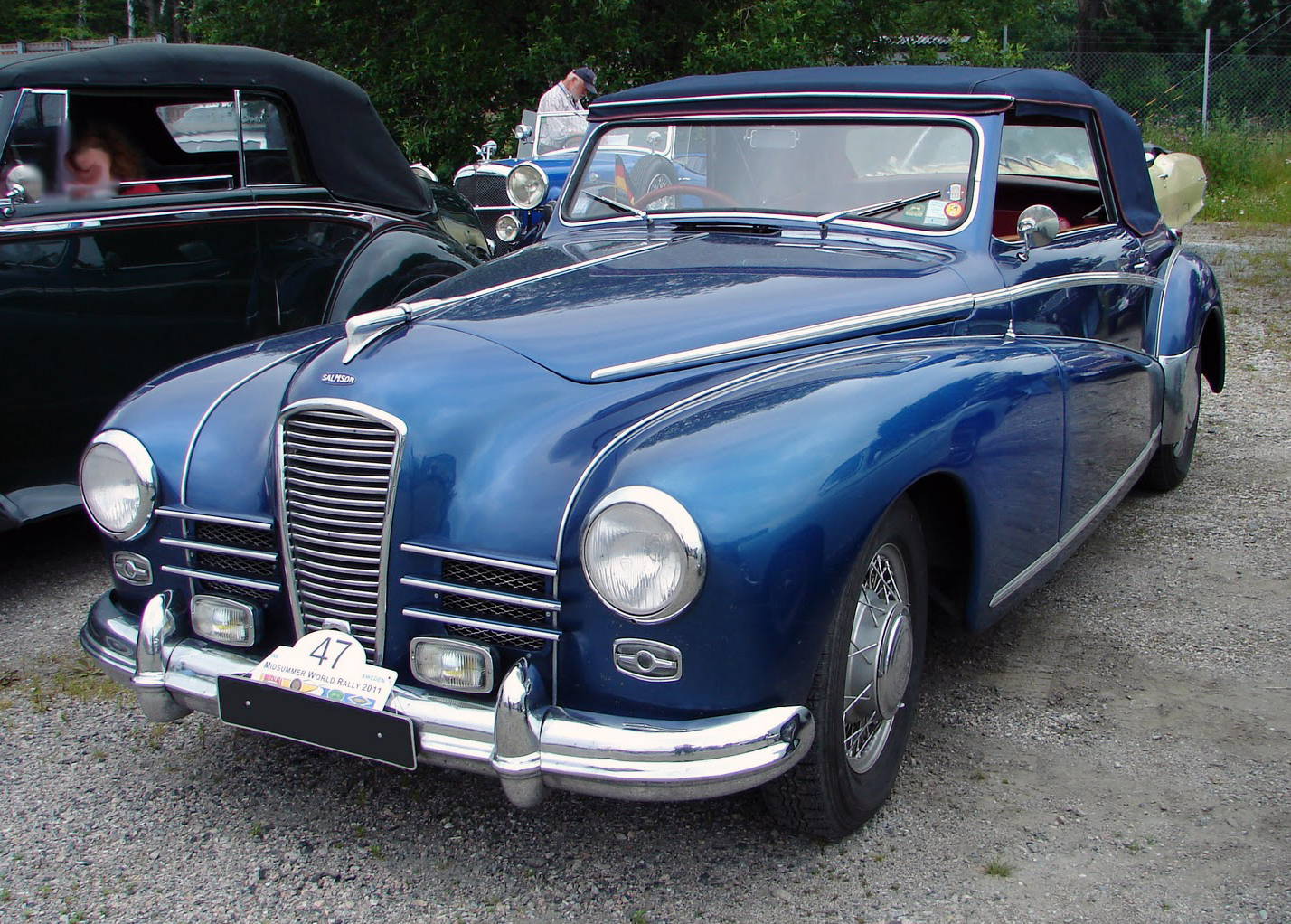
Salmson Cabriolet G72

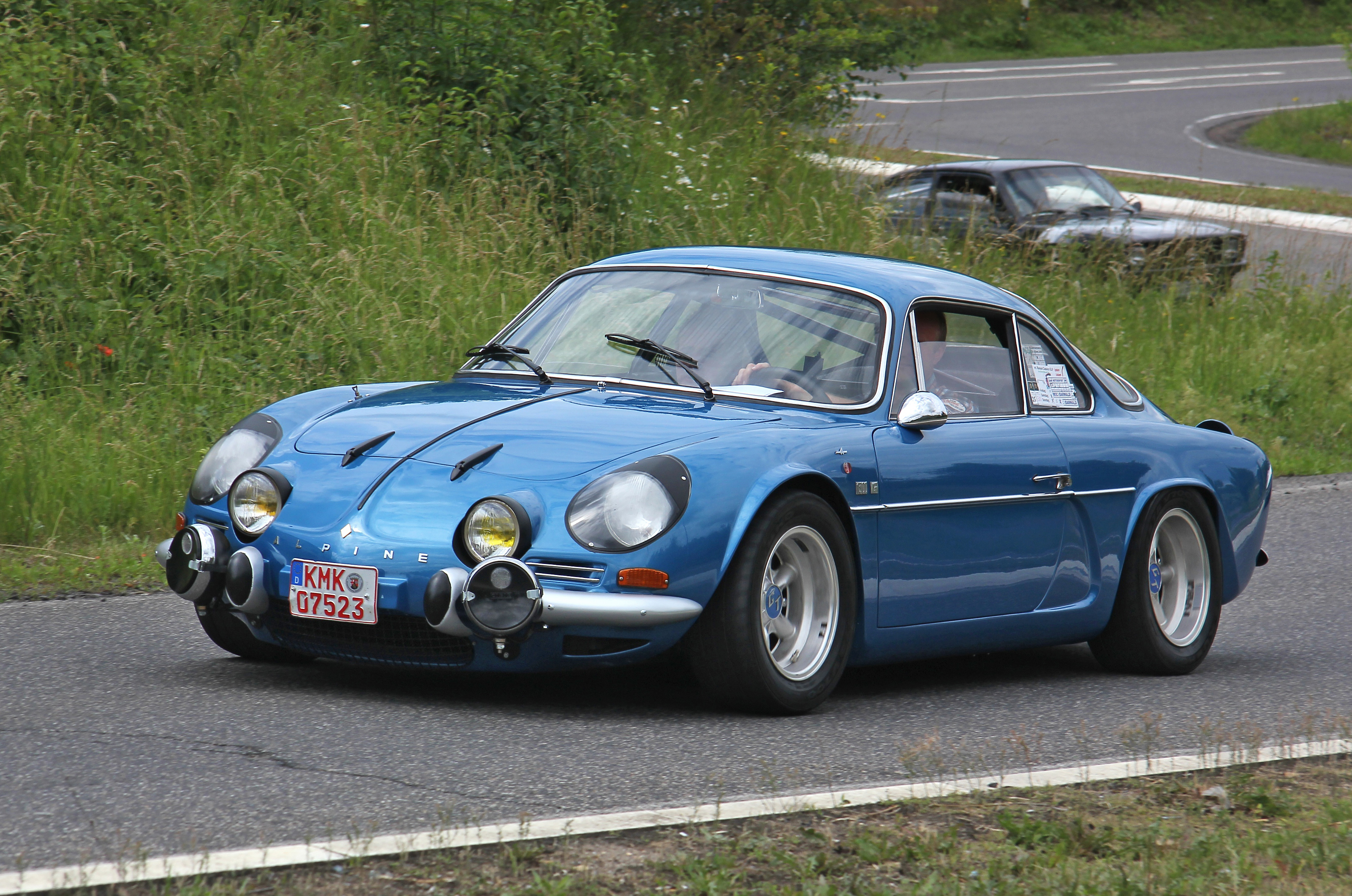
Alpine A110

1903 – France remains the world's leading automaker, producing 30,124 cars (nearly 49% of the world total) as against 11,235 cars produced in the USA.

1903 – Hotchkiss et Cie is founded. The company is bought by Peugeot in 1950, but discontinues auto production by 1955.

1905 – Delage is founded by Louis Delage. The company is bought by Delahaye in 1935 but ceases auto production in 1954.

1910 – Ettore Bugatti started the Bugatti company in Molsheim (then in Germany, now in France). Production ends in 1956.

1911 – The French branch of Hispano-Suiza is founded. Auto production is ended in 1938.

1919 – Avions Voisin is founded by Gabriel Voisin. Production ceases in 1939. After the war, Voisin designed a microcar, the Biscuter.

1919 – Citroën founded by Andre Citroën.

1920 – Darracq (founded 1896) merges with Sunbeam and Talbot, creating what eventually became Talbot-Lago in 1935. The company is bought by Simca in 1959.

1921 – Amilcar is founded. The company merges with Hotchkiss et Cie in 1937 and ceases production in 1939.

1921 – Salmson begins auto production. In 1957, the company is bought by Renault.

1922 – Leon Paulet begins auto production.

1929 – French annual automobile production peaked at 253,000 passenger cars, a level that would not be matched till after the Second World War.

1933 – With French passenger car production at 140,635 units, France lost its place as Europe's top automobile producer to Great Britain 220,775. The French roads nevertheless reflected three decades during much of which the French auto-industry had led the world, with a "car parc" of 1,448,000, ahead of Britain which had 1,210,880 cars registered and of Germany with only 510,680 cars.

1934 – Simca established by Henri Pigozzi to build Fiat cars.

1934 – Citroën introduces the Traction Avant, featuring front wheel drive and unitary construction. Citroën becomes bankrupt and is taken over by the Michelin Tire Company.

1934 – Matford begins building Ford cars, but ceases in 1939. In 1947, the company is reorganized as Ford SAF and sells cars under the Ford name.

1936 – While the British and German economies powered ahead during the 1930s, growth in the French economy was at best tentative, with a period of destructive strikes and economic paralysis during the middle years of the decade. In Germany the Hitler government treated the German auto-industry to a central role in a radical economic strategy driven by what can be seen as a Keynesian approach to "fiscal stimulus". In 1936 France fell from second to third place among Europe's auto-producing nations, recording production of 204,000 cars, while Germany's production amounted to 213,117 passenger cars.

1945 – Renault becomes state owned and is called Régie nationale des usines Renault (RNUR).

1945 – The Pons Plan reflected government determination to structure the French auto-industry according to priorities identified by politicians and civil servants. A select group of auto manufacturers is favored. A punitive fiscal horsepower tax is imposed on larger engines leading to the demise of most of the Grandes Routières such as Bugatti, Delage, Delahaye, Hotchkiss et Cie, Salmson and Talbot-Lago by the mid-1950s.

1946 – Renault introduces the Renault 4CV model.

1948 – Citroën introduces the Citroën 2CV model, a small front-wheel drive saloon marketed as a "people's car" in the same vein as Germany's Volkswagen Beetle.

1948 – Peugeot introduces the Peugeot 203 model.

== 1950–2000 ==
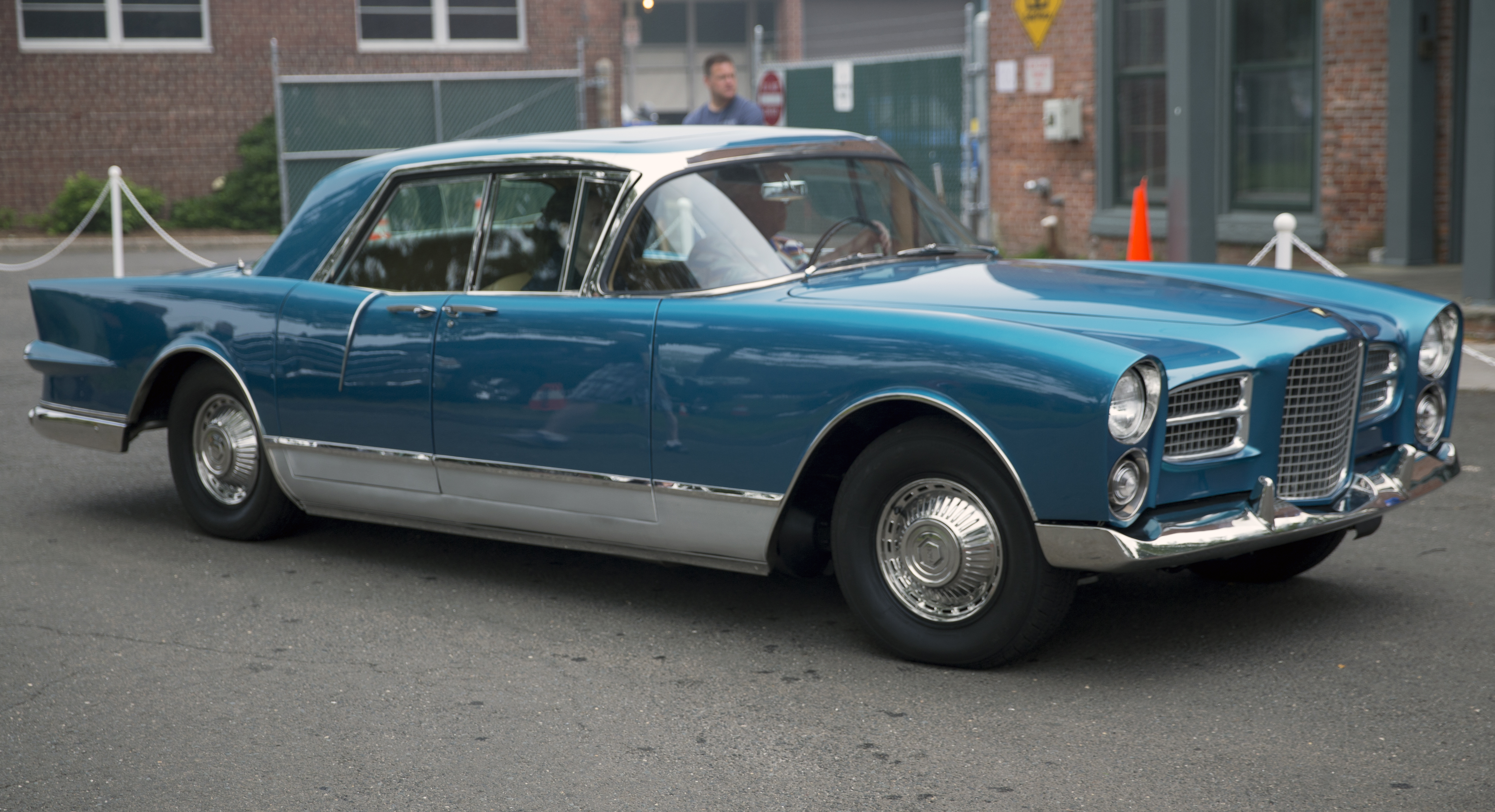
Facel Vega Excellence

1954 – Facel Vega established.

1954 – Simca acquires Ford SAF.

1955 – Citroën introduces the Citroën DS model, equipped with disk brakes and self-leveling suspension.

1955 – Alpine (car maker) is founded by Jean Rédélé and develops a series of sports cars. Launch of the Citroën DS, flagship saloon car in the Citroën range.

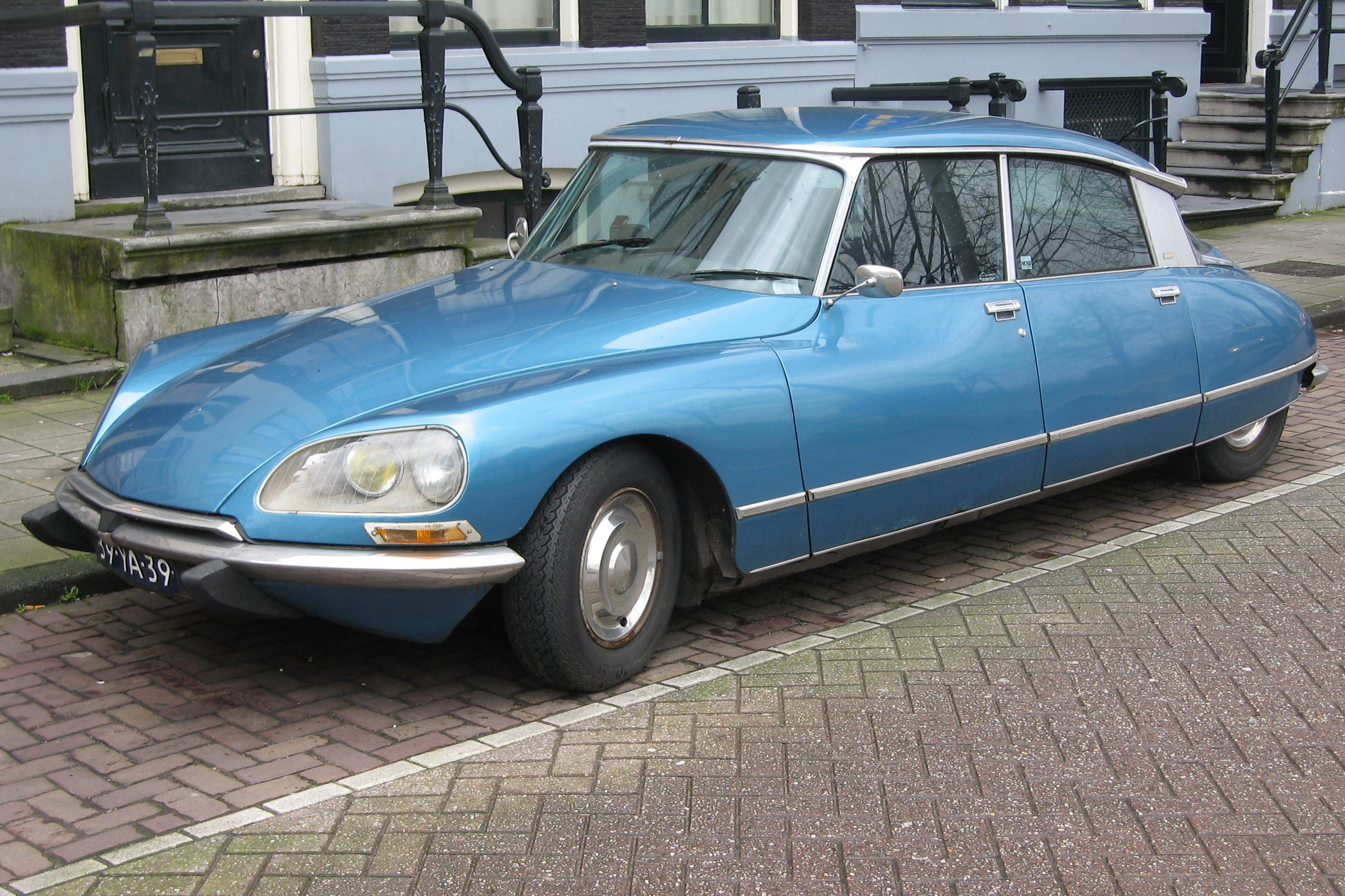
Citroën DS

1957 – End of Citroën Traction Avant production after 23 years.

1960 – Launch of the Peugeot 404 saloon models.

1961 – Launch of the Renault 4, a small estate car which is aimed at the lower end of the market dominated in France by the Citroën 2CV, as well as foreign competitors like the Volkswagen Beetle and BMC's new Mini.

1963 – American automotive giant Chrysler takes a 63% ownership stake in Simca.

1964 – Closure of Facel Vega after just 10 years of car production due financial problems.

1965 – Matra begins automobile production. Citroën takes over Panhard, phasing out the marque on passenger cars. The Renault 16, a large family hatchback (the first production car with that bodystyle), is launched and voted European Car of the Year.

1968 – Citroën takes over Italian sports and luxury car maker Maserati. Peugeot launches the 504, a large rear-wheel drive family saloon, which is voted European Car of the Year.

1969 – The Renault 12 medium-sized saloon and estate range is launched, but it missed out on the European Car of the Year award, which goes to the Fiat 128 from Italy.

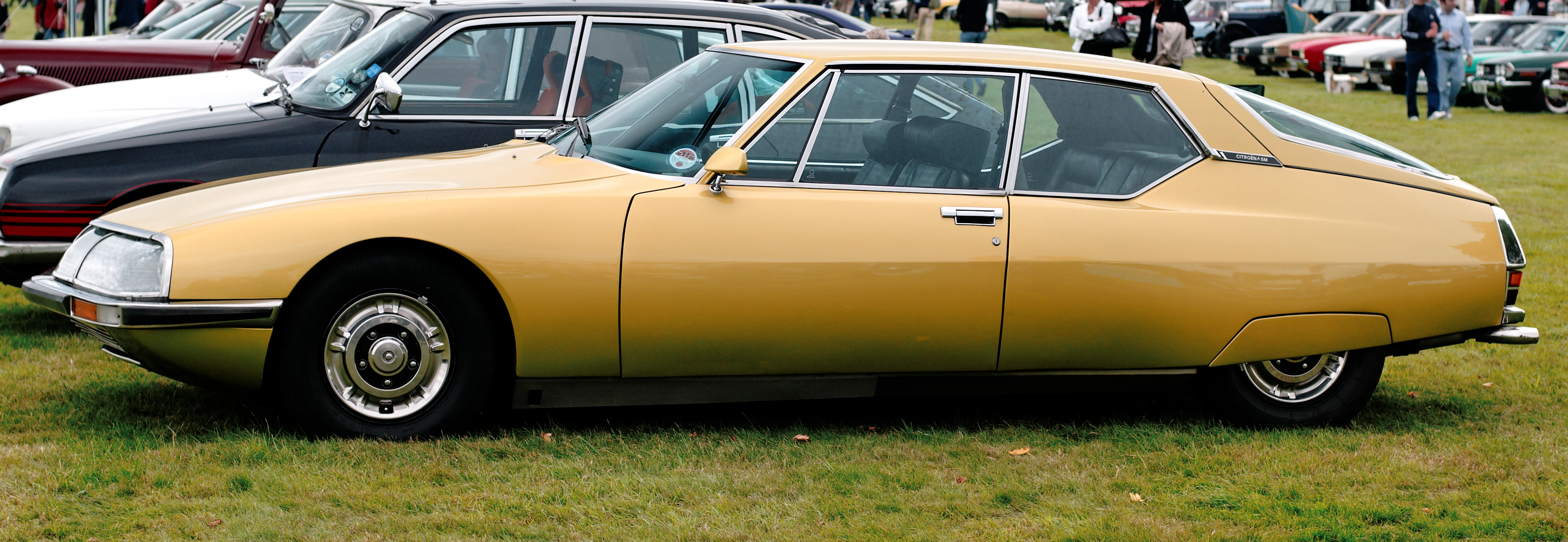
Citroën SM

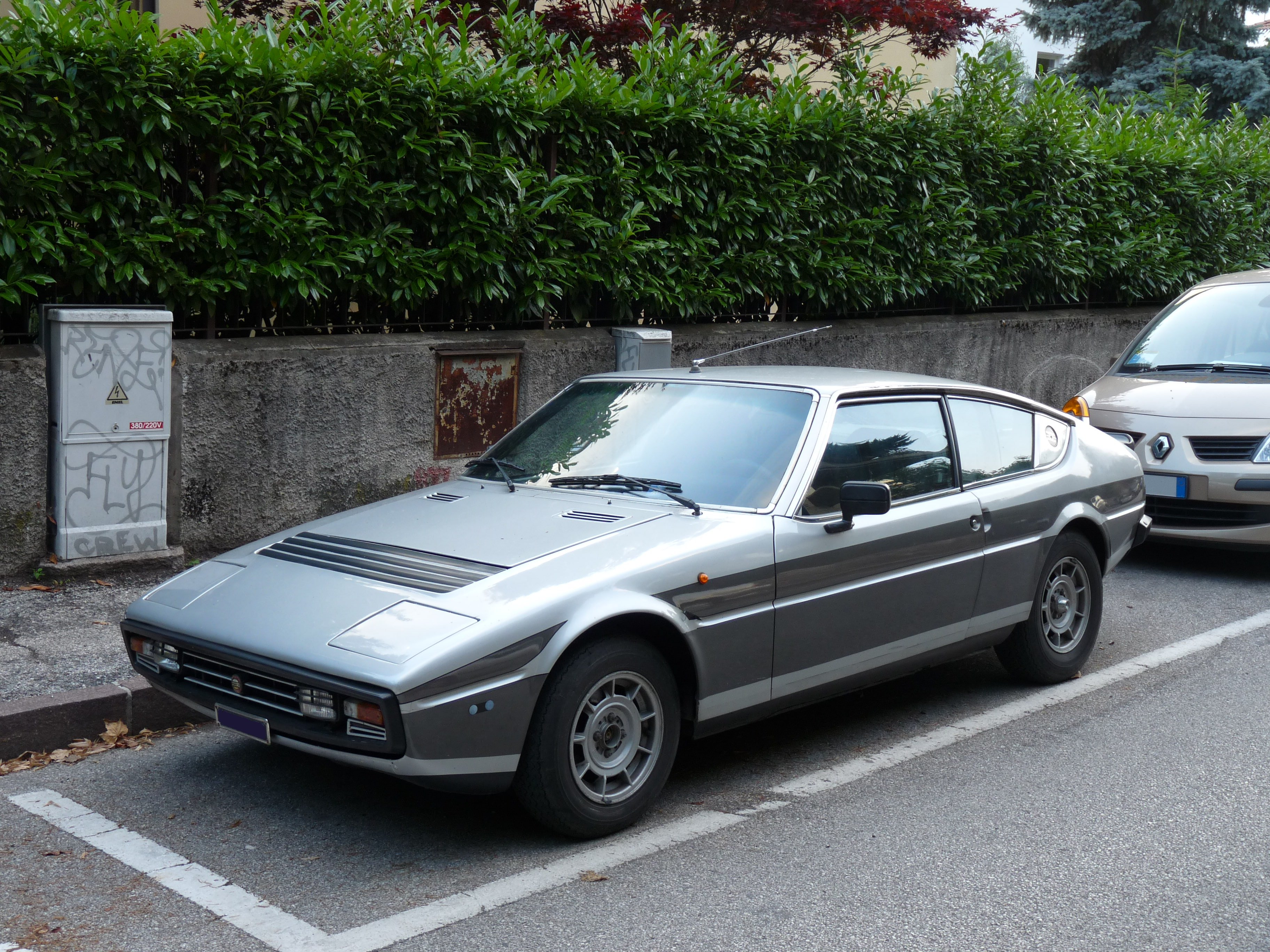
Matra Bagheera

1970 – Citroën introduces the Citroën SM, a large coupe featuring a self-leveling suspension, self-centering speed-sensitive power steering, hydropneumatic brakes, and engine technology from Maserati. It also launched the new GS family car, which is voted European Car of the Year. Chrysler launches a new French-built, British-designed flagship saloon model, the 180.

1972 – Launch of the Renault 5, France's first small hatchback. It features a three-door bodystyle and front-wheel drive.

1973 – Launch of the Chrysler 2 Litre, a larger-engine version of the 180 model.

1974 – Despite its new CX (successor to the 19-year-old DS) being voted European Car of the Year, Citroën files bankruptcy. Maserati is then sold to Alejandro de Tomaso. Peugeot launches its first hatchback model, the three-door 104, which is launched two years after the original saloon.

1975 – The Simca 1307 (sold in Britain as the Chrysler Alpine) is launched and is voted European Car of the Year, making use of a hatchback bodystyle and front-wheel drive. Citroën is saved from collapse by merging into Peugeot. Renault moves into the luxury car market with its 20/30 range, which unusually for this sector of car features a hatchback and front-wheel drive. Launch of the Citroën LN, which features a 652cc two-cylinder engine and a three-door hatchback based on the Peugeot 104. The last Citroën DS is built after 20 years and more than 1.4 million sales worldwide.

1976 – Renault launches a new small family hatchback model, the R14, which is similar in concept to the Volkswagen Golf from West Germany.

1978 – PSA Peugeot Citroën takes over Chrysler's European division, the former Rootes Group in Britain and Simca in France. Shortly before the sale is completed, the new Horizon mid-sized hatchback is voted European Car of the Year. Launch of the Renault 18 saloons and estates, which feature front-wheel drive and will eventually replace the long-running R12 models. Renault begins financial involvement with American Motors. Citroën launches the Visa, a small five-door hatchback. Peugeot launches the 305 saloon, which will eventually replace the smaller 304.

1979 – Peugeot launches the 505 saloon, replacement for the 504, which will remain in production for a few years in Europe. The Simca marque is discontinued after 45 years by the company's new owner Peugeot, who revive the Talbot badge for the entire former Chrysler Europe model range. The Citroën GS is updated after nine years to become the GSA, and gains a hatchback.

1980 – Demise of the Renault 12 after 11 years in production and the Renault 16 after 15 years. New to the Renault range is the Renault Fuego coupe, which is similar in size and price to cars like the Ford Capri. Peugeot launches the Talbot Solara, a saloon version of the Alpine hatchback, and a new flagship saloon, the Tagora, which was actually developed by Chrysler as a replacement for the 180/2 litre models.

1981 – The Renault 9, a small family saloon, is voted European Car of the Year on its launch. Launch of the Talbot Samba, a reworked version of the Peugeot 104, which is built at the former Simca factory in Poissy.

1982 – Citroën launches the Citroën BX, which will eventually replace the smaller GSA.

1983 – Peugeot launches the new 205 supermini, styled by Italian designer Pininfarina. Renault has a new competitor in the mid-sized hatchback sector with the new 11. French production of the Peugeot 504 ends after 15 years. At the end of the year, Renault replaces its 20/30 flagship models with the R25.

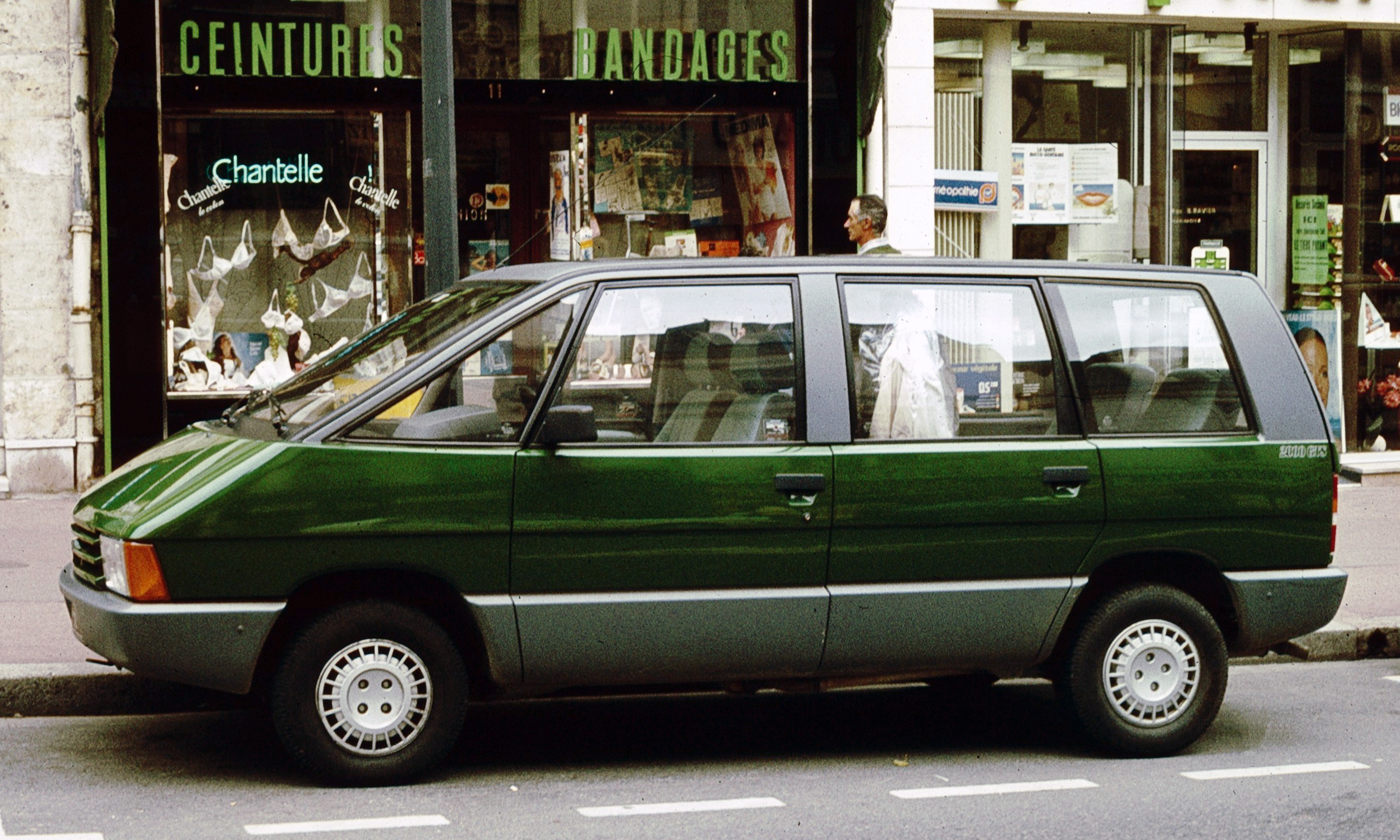
The original Renault Espace

1984 - Renault launches the Espace - Europe's first volume multi purpose vehicle. The R5 receives a complete redesign but its styling is still recognisable as an update of the 1972 original.

1985 – The Peugeot 309 goes into production, built at the former Rootes factory near Coventry, England, rather than in France. Peugeot had scrapped plans to sell the car under the Talbot marque, which will now be phased out on passenger cars.

1986 – Georges Besse, Chairman of Renault, is murdered by the communist terrorist group Action Directe. End of Talbot Samba and Alpine production, as Peugeot begins to phase out the Talbot brand, which will be retained for commercial vehicles only. Renault replaces the 18 saloon and estate with the Renault 21 saloon and Nevada/Savanna seven-seater estate. French production and sales of the Renault 4 finish after 25 years, but it is set to continue production in Argentina until the early 1990s. The Citroën GS/GSA is finally discontinued after 16 years in production.

1987 – Peugeot launches the 405, also built in Britain, which is voted European Car of the Year. Citroën has a new entrant in the supermini market with its AX. A year after the end of French and British production, the last Talbot Horizon models are built in Spain and Finland, signalling the end of the Talbot brand on passenger cars.

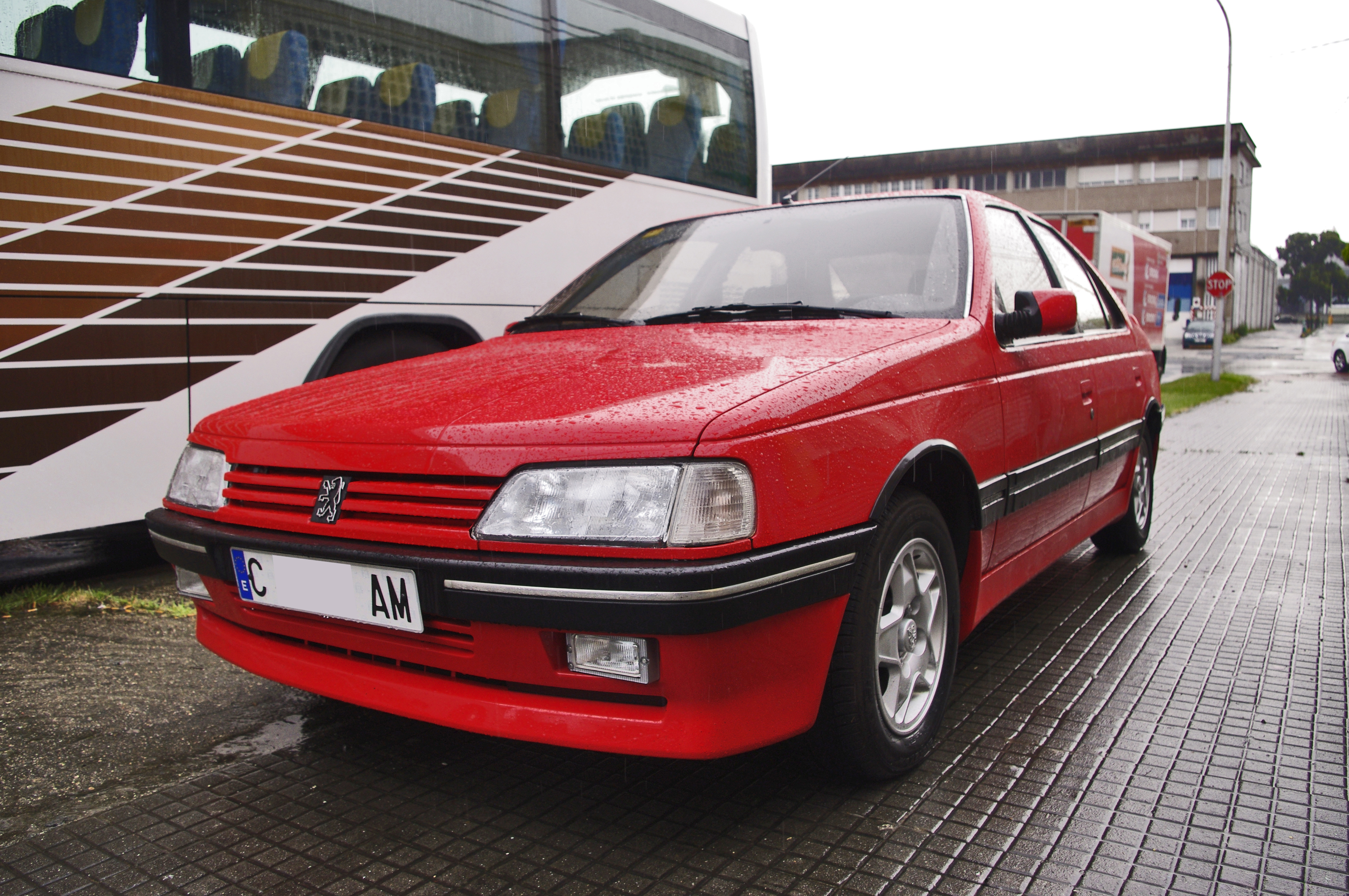
Peugeot 405

1988 – Citroën 2CV production in France ends after 40 years, along with the Visa after 10 years. 2CV production is to continue in Portugal until 1990. Renault replaces the 9/11 range with the R19. Launch of the Peugeot 405 in estate form.

1989 – The Citroën CX saloon is discontinued after 15 years and replaced by the XM, which is voted European Car of the Year. The last Peugeot 305 models are built.

1990 – Launch of the Renault Clio, a new small hatchback, which will eventually replace the R5. It is voted European Car of the Year. Citroën ends production of the 2CV after 42 years, the last two of which saw the car produced in Portugal.

1991 – Peugeot partly replaces its hugely popular 205 with the slightly smaller 106, while Citroën re-enters the medium-sized hatchback market with its ZX, the first of two replacements for the ageing BX. The final versions of the CX are built after a production run of 17 years, with the estate model being axed two years after the saloon, to make way for the new XM estate. Peugeot launches a new entry-level model, the 106.

1992 – PSA Peugeot Citroën establishes joint venture with Dongfeng Motor Corporation in China. Renault enters the city car market with the Twingo, which is only built for left-hand drive markets. Renault replaces the eight-year-old R25 with the Safrane as its new top-of-the-range model.

1993 – Peugeot replaces the 309 with the 306, which also partly replaces the smaller 205 (which is still in production in its tenth year). Citroën launches the Xantia, replacement for the BX hatchback. At the end of the year, Renault discontinues the R21 after nearly eight years on sale and replaces it with the Laguna.

1994 – The last versions of the Citroën BX are produced after a 12-year run, when the estate model is finally replaced by an estate version of the Xantia hatchback.

1995 – Renault launches the Mégane, a medium-sized range of hatchbacks, saloons, coupes, cabriolets and estates. Renault also launches an estate version of the Laguna to replace the Nevada/Savanna. Launch of the Eurovan, a venture between PSA and Fiat, which will be sold as an MPV with Peugeot, Citroën, Fiat and Lancia badges. Peugeot replaces the long-running and hugely successful 405 with the 406, although it is initially only sold as a saloon.

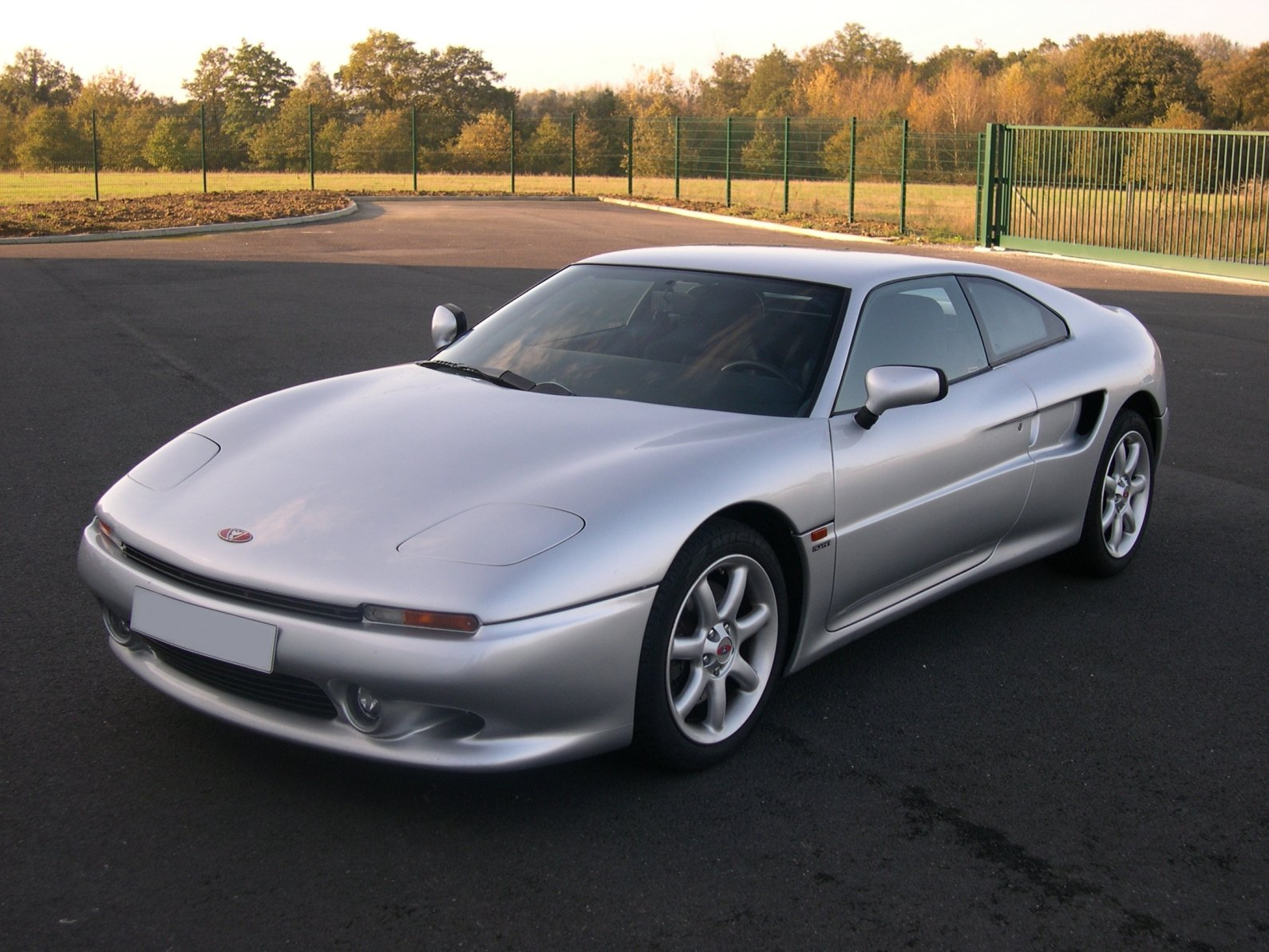
Venturi Atlantique

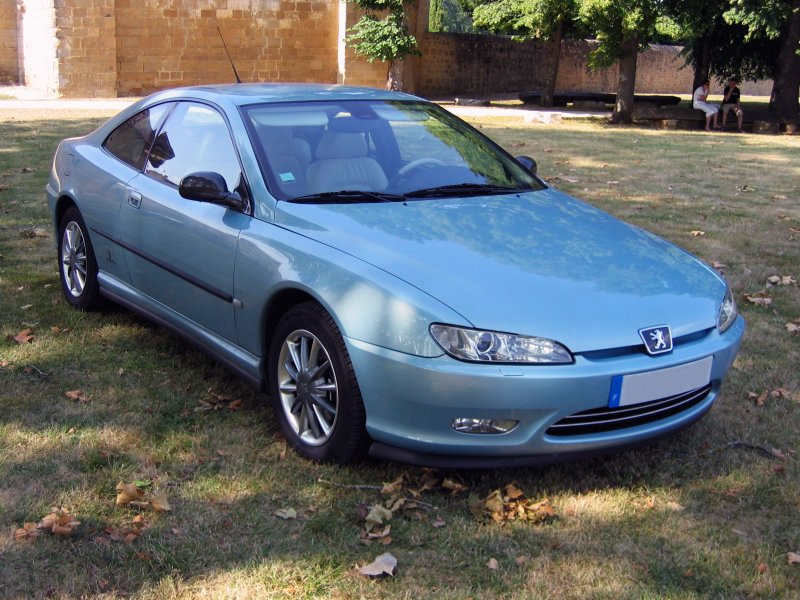
Peugeot 406 coupe

1996 – Renault is privatized and its new Scénic version of the Megane hatchback is launched to compete in the new compact MPV sector, winning the European Car of the Year award. Production of R5 is finally ended after nearly 25 years, although the last few years of production were concentrated in Slovenia rather than France. Peugeot facelifts the 106 supermini to keep it competitive with a host of newer rivals, while Citroën makes use of the 106 design for its new Saxo, which replaces the AX. Peugeot re-enters the coupe market after more than a decade away with the 406 Coupe.

1997 – Smart assembly plant opened in Hambach, Moselle by German carmaker Mercedes-Benz to produce two-seater microcars. Peugeot's 406 range is completed with the launch of an estate model.

1998 – Volkswagen AG obtains the rights to the Bugatti name. They later build an auto plant in Molsheim which will later produce the Bugatti Veyron. Demise of the Peugeot 205 after 15 years. Its replacement is the 206, which is built in both France and Britain.

1999 – Renault obtains a controlling interest in Japanese automaker Nissan. Renault buys 99% ownership in Romanian automaker Dacia, which has produced its version of the Renault 12 for the last 30 years. Launch of the Citroën Picasso, a compact MPV similar in the style to the Renault Scénic, which is based on the floorpan of the Xsara hatchback.

2000 – Demise of the Citroën XM after 11 years, following a sharp fall in sales since the mid 1990s. The Peugeot 206 CC is launched - the first French car to feature a folding steel roof, which enables it to double as a coupe and convertible. The second generation Renault Laguna is introduced at the end of the year, being one of the first mass production cars to feature a "keyless" entry and ignition system.

== 2000 – present ==
2000 – Renault buys 70% of South Korean Samsung Motors and forms a new subsidiary Renault Samsung Motors (now 80% owned). Launch of the Renault Laguna II, which is one of the first mass-produced cars in the world to feature keyless entry and ignition.

2001 – Toyota starts production at its Western European assembly line for the Toyota Yaris in Valenciennes. Peugeot's new Peugeot 307, replacement for the long-running 306, is voted European Car of the Year.

2001 – Renault Trucks is sold to Volvo.

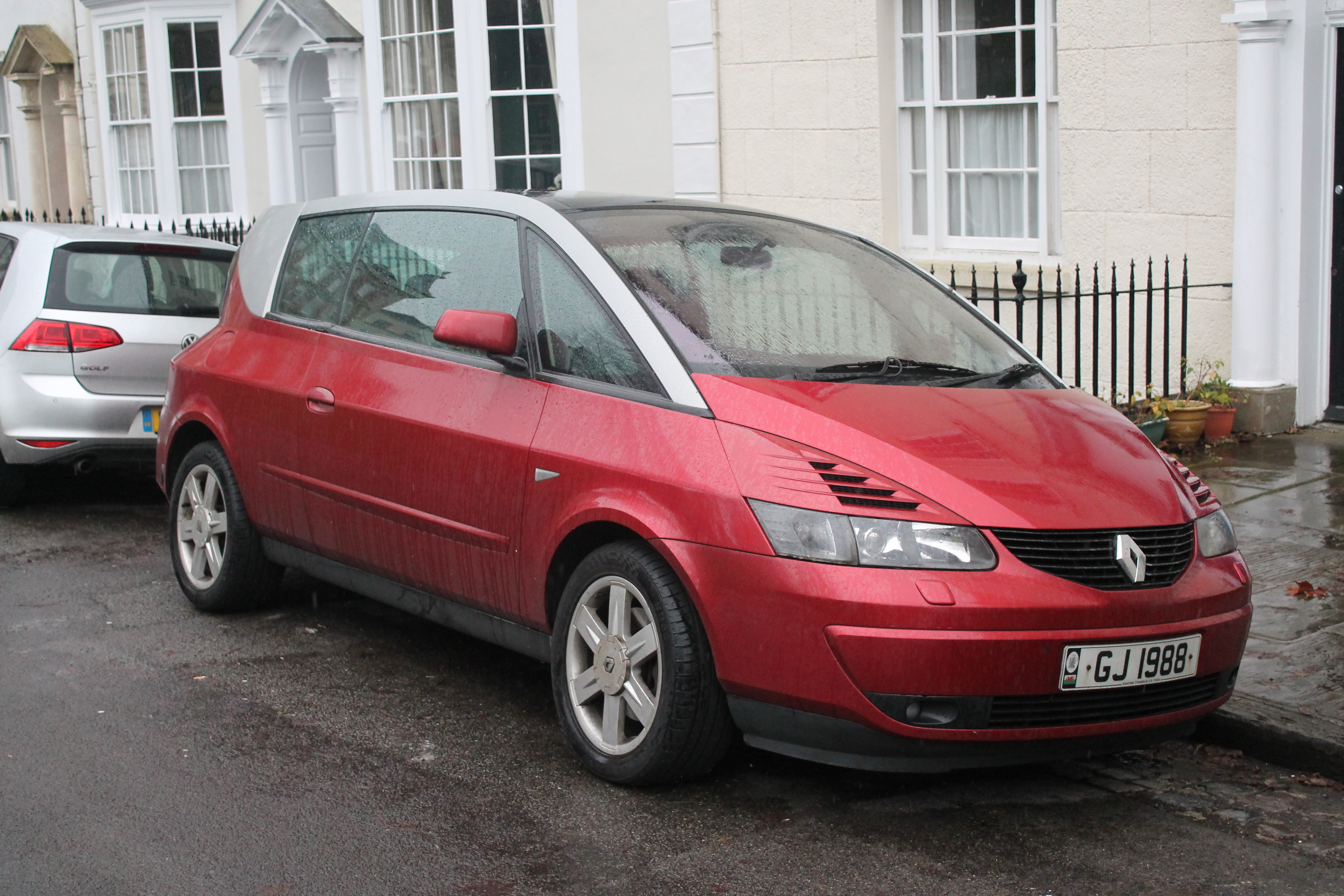
Renault Avantime

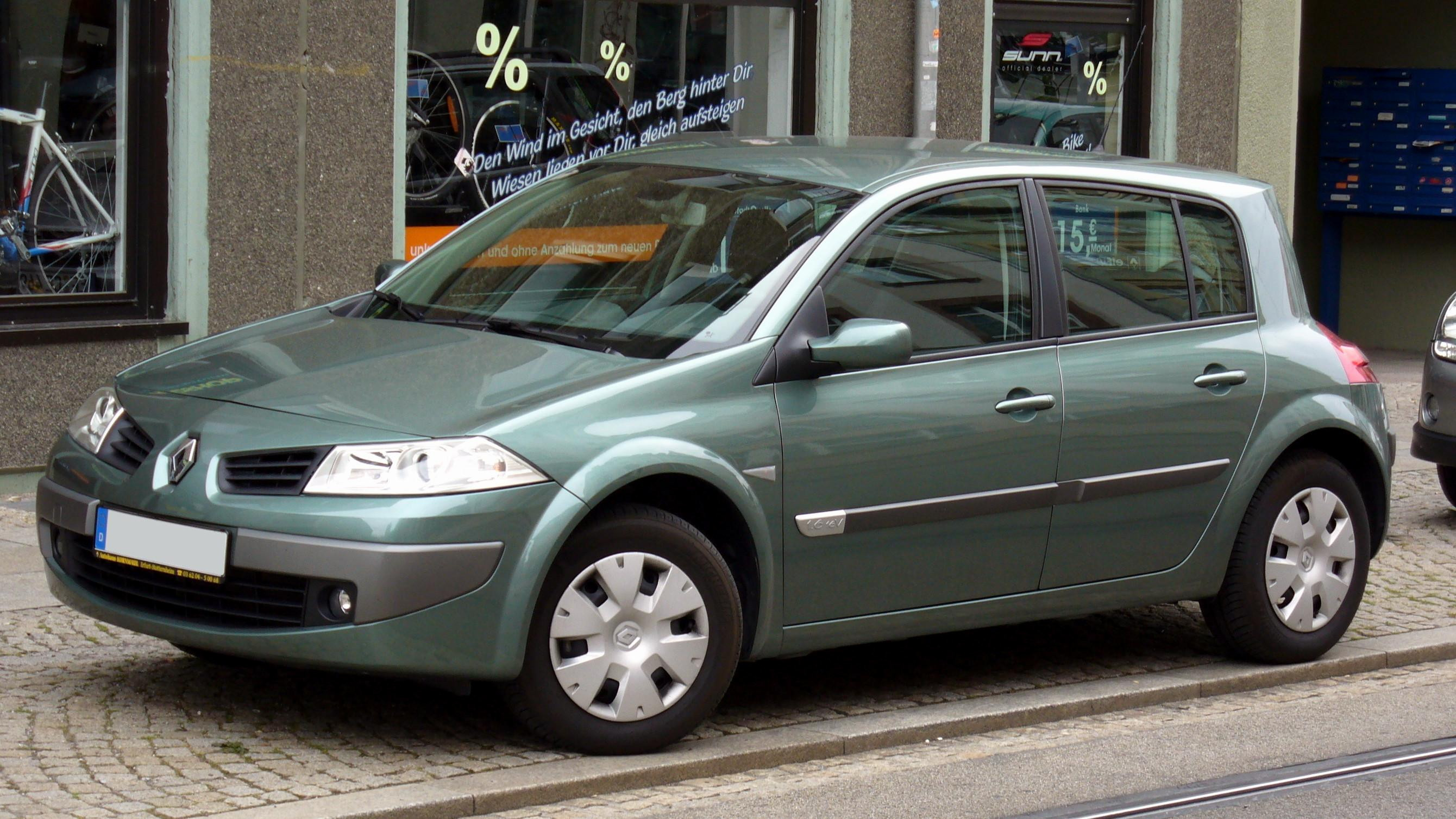
Renault Mégane, 2003 European Car of the Year

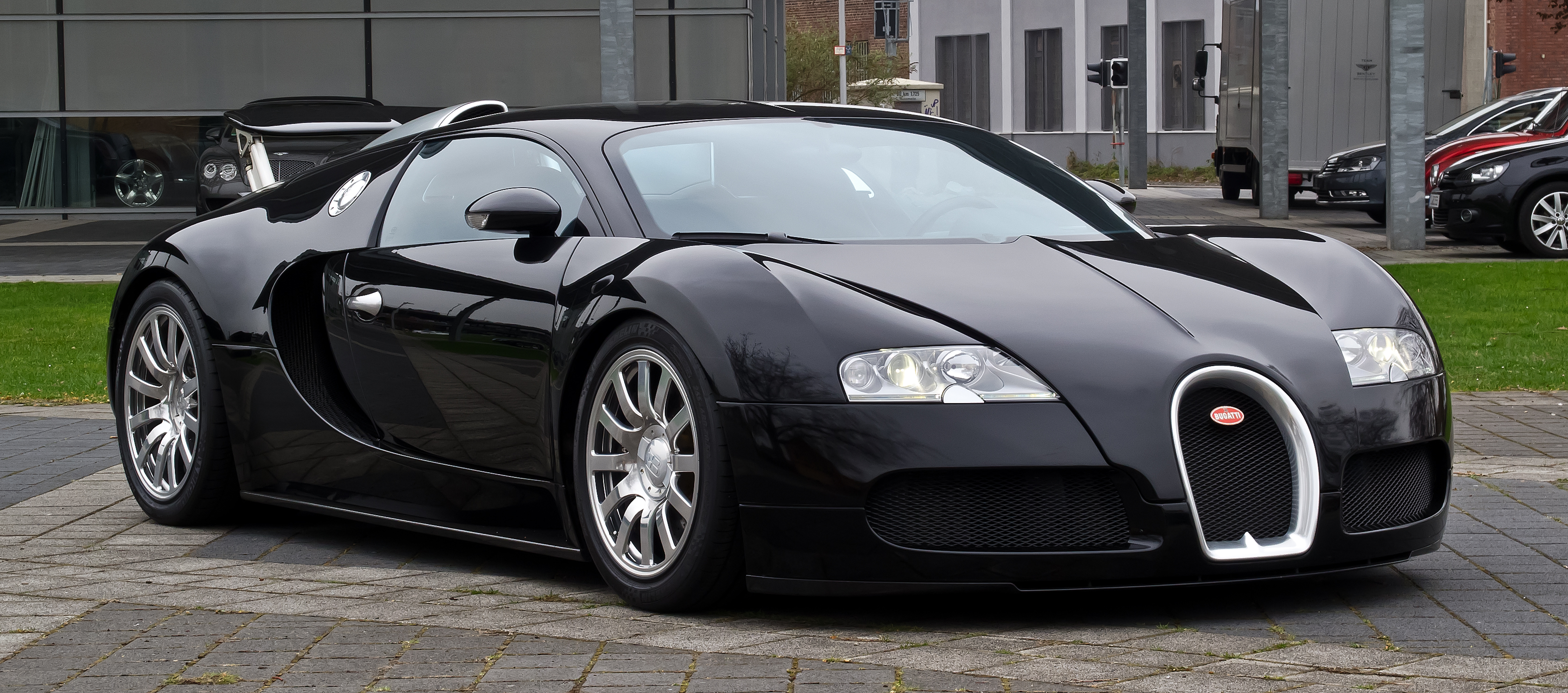
Bugatti Veyron

2002 – The Renault Megane II is launched and voted European Car of the Year. The five-door Citroën C3 is launched, the first of two new cars which will replace the Saxo.

2003 – End of Peugeot 106 production after 12 years. It had been on sale since 1991, with a facelift in 1996. The Citroën Saxo is also discontinued following the launch of the three-door Citroën C2.

2004 – Replacement of the Peugeot 406 by the Peugeot 407. Citroën replaces the Xsara hatchback with the Citroën C4.

2005 – The Renault Clio III is launched and voted European Car of the Year, with the second generation model being renamed the Clio Campus and now being produced in Slovenia. Launch of the Citroën C1 and Peugeot 107, which are built in a Czech factory as part of a venture with Toyota.

2006 – Launch of the Peugeot 207, which will eventually replace the 206. The new car is produced in France. Peugeot closes its factory near Coventry, England, which it bought from Chrysler 28 years ago. The Picasso and seven-seater Grand Picasso versions of the Citroën C4 are launched, but the hugely successful Xsara Picasso remains in production alongside it.

2007 – The Renault Twingo, France's longest-running current production model, is replaced by an all-new model after 15 years. The new Twingo is only produced in Slovenia. The Peugeot 307 is replaced by the Peugeot 308.

2008 – Renault obtains a 25% interest in Russian automaker AvtoVAZ.

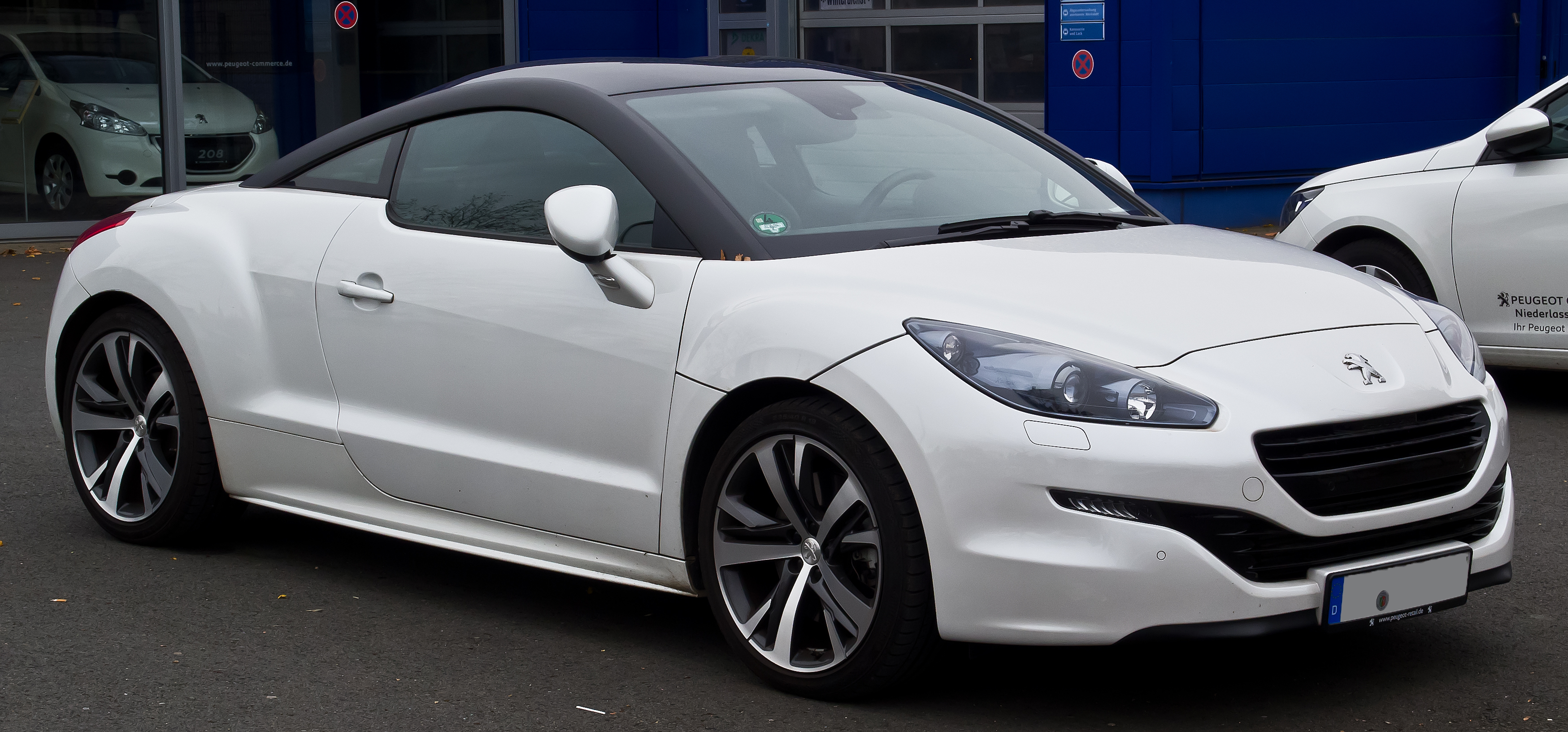
Peugeot RCZ

2010 – Demise of the Peugeot 206 after 12 years in production, the last four of which took place in Slovakia. Peugeot replaces its 407 and 607 saloons with a single model, the 508. Launch of the second generation Citroën C4 family hatchback, which also spawns a more luxurious version called the DS4.

2012 – Launch of the Peugeot 208, replacement for the 207. End of Citroën Xsara Picasso production after 13 years, marking the end of the last volume production passenger car in France from before the year 2000.

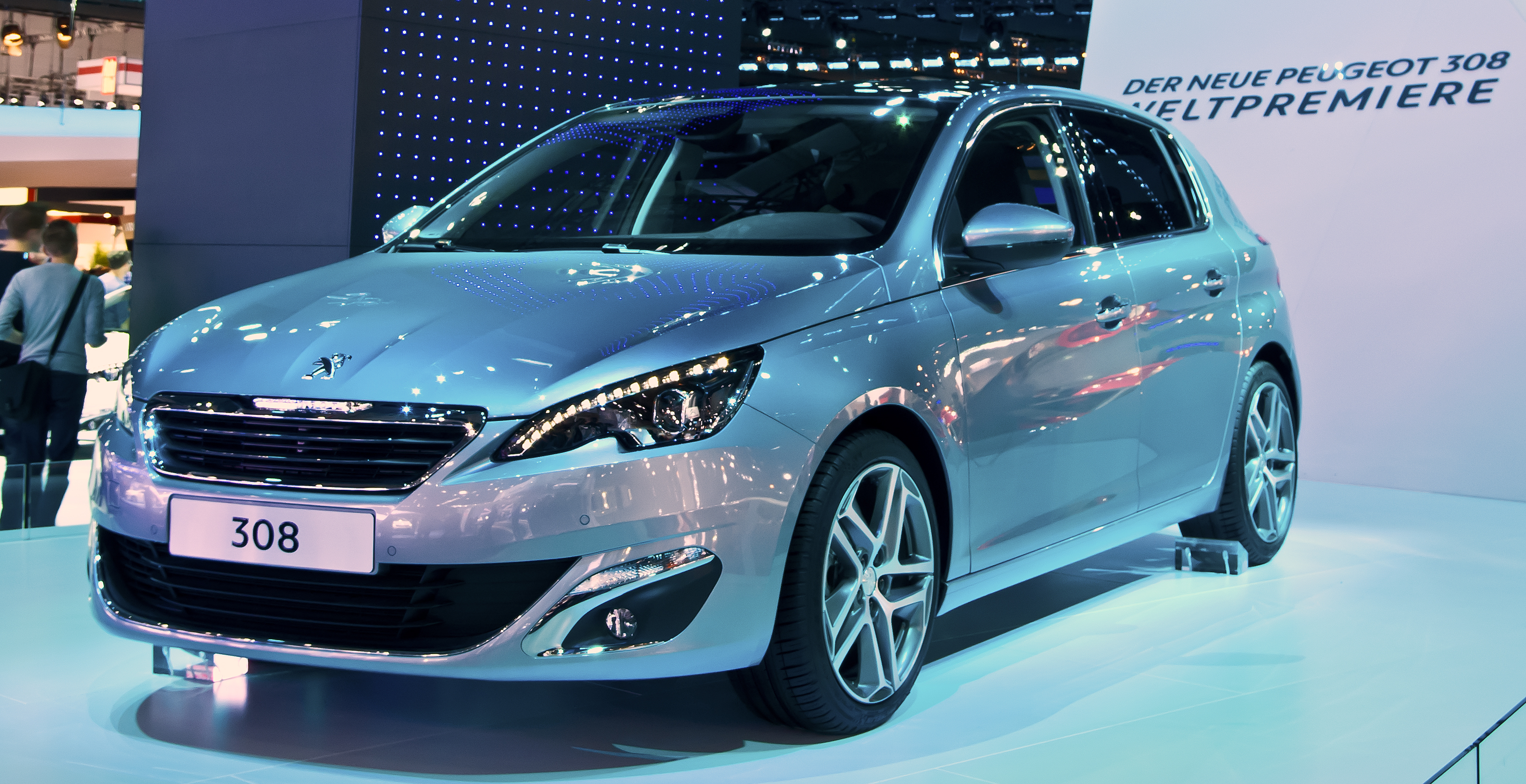
Peugeot 308, 2014 European Car of the Year

2013 - Launch of the second generation Peugeot 308, which is voted European Car of the Year.

2014 – Replacement of the Peugeot 107 with the Peugeot 108, which once again is part of a Peugeot-Toyota venture, built in the Czech Republic alongside the new generation Citroën C1 and Toyota Aygo. Launch of the Renault Twingo III, which features a switch to rear-wheel drive and a rear-mounted engine, the first Renault in half a century to feature such a mechanical layout.

2021 – PSA Group completed the merger with Italian-American automaker Fiat Chrysler Automobiles, thus leading up to the establishment of Stellantis, headquartered in Amsterdam, Netherlands. This merger also leading up to the reunion between Maserati and Citroën after 46 years.

2022 – Renault announces sale of AvtoVAZ stake to the Central Research and Development Automobile and Engine Institute (NAMI), following Russia's invasion of Ukraine.

== Production data ==
Vehicle production in France:

Year	Unit production
1950	357,000
1960	1,369,000
1970	2,750,086
1980	3,378,433
1990	3,768,993
1999	3,180,193
2000	3,348,361
2001	3,628,418
2002	3,601,870
2003	3,620,066
2004	3,665,990
2005	3,549,008
2006	3,169,219
2007	3,019,144
2008	2,568,978
2009	2,049,762
2010	2,227,742
2011	2,242,928
2012	1,967,765
2013	1,740,220
2014	1,821,464
2015	1,970,000
2016	2,082,000
2017	2,227,000
2018	2,270,000
2019	2,202,460
2020	1,316,371
2021	1,351,308
2022	1,383,173
2023	1,505,076
2024	910,243

Total worldwide motor vehicle production by Renault in 2010 (excluding Nissan) was 2,716,286, of which 2,395,876 were passenger vehicles. This ranked tenth among all vehicle manufacturers. Total motor vehicle production by PSA Peugeot Citroën in 2010 was 3,605,524, of which 3,214,810 passenger vehicles. This ranked eighth among all vehicle manufacturers.

== Gallery ==
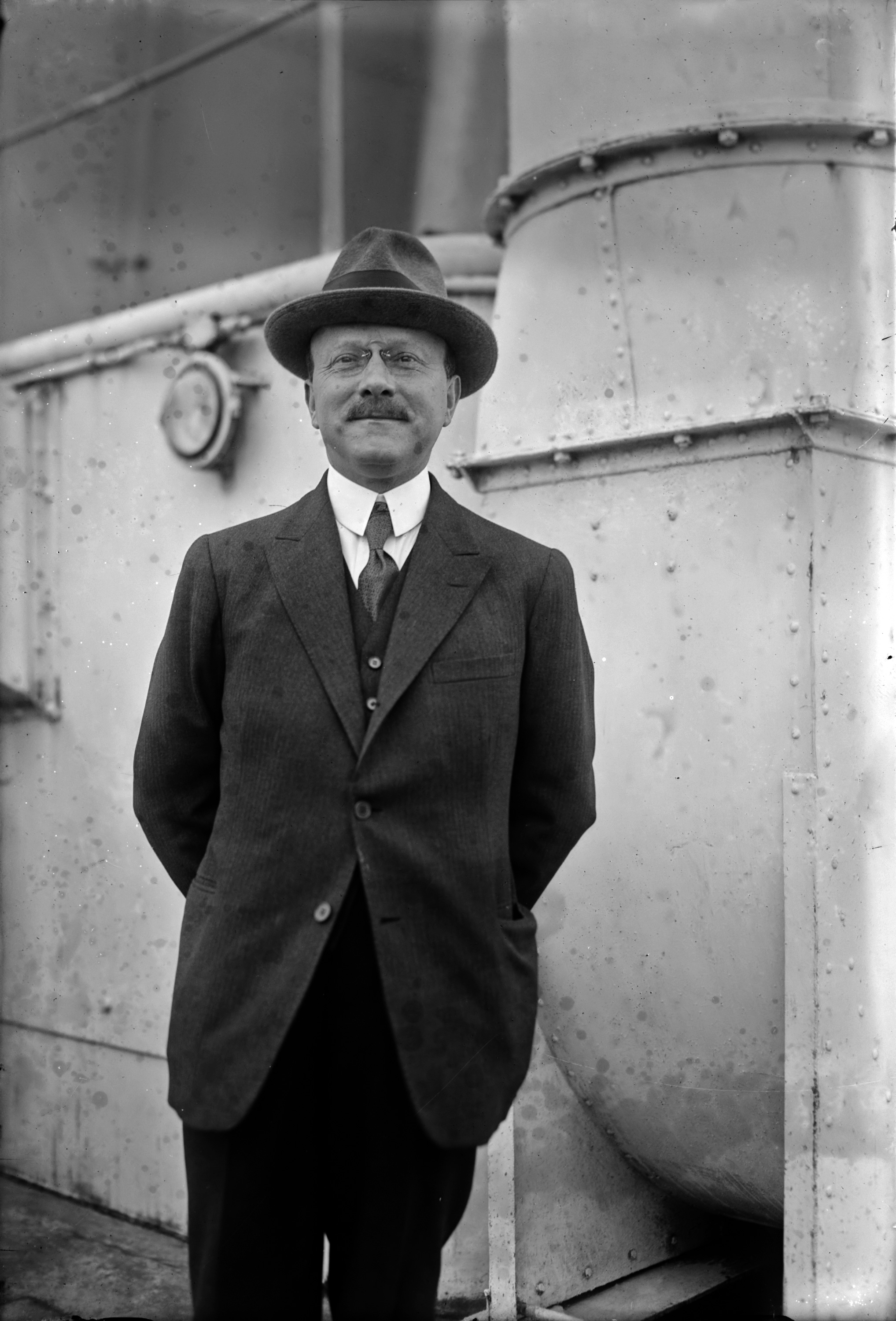
André Citroën

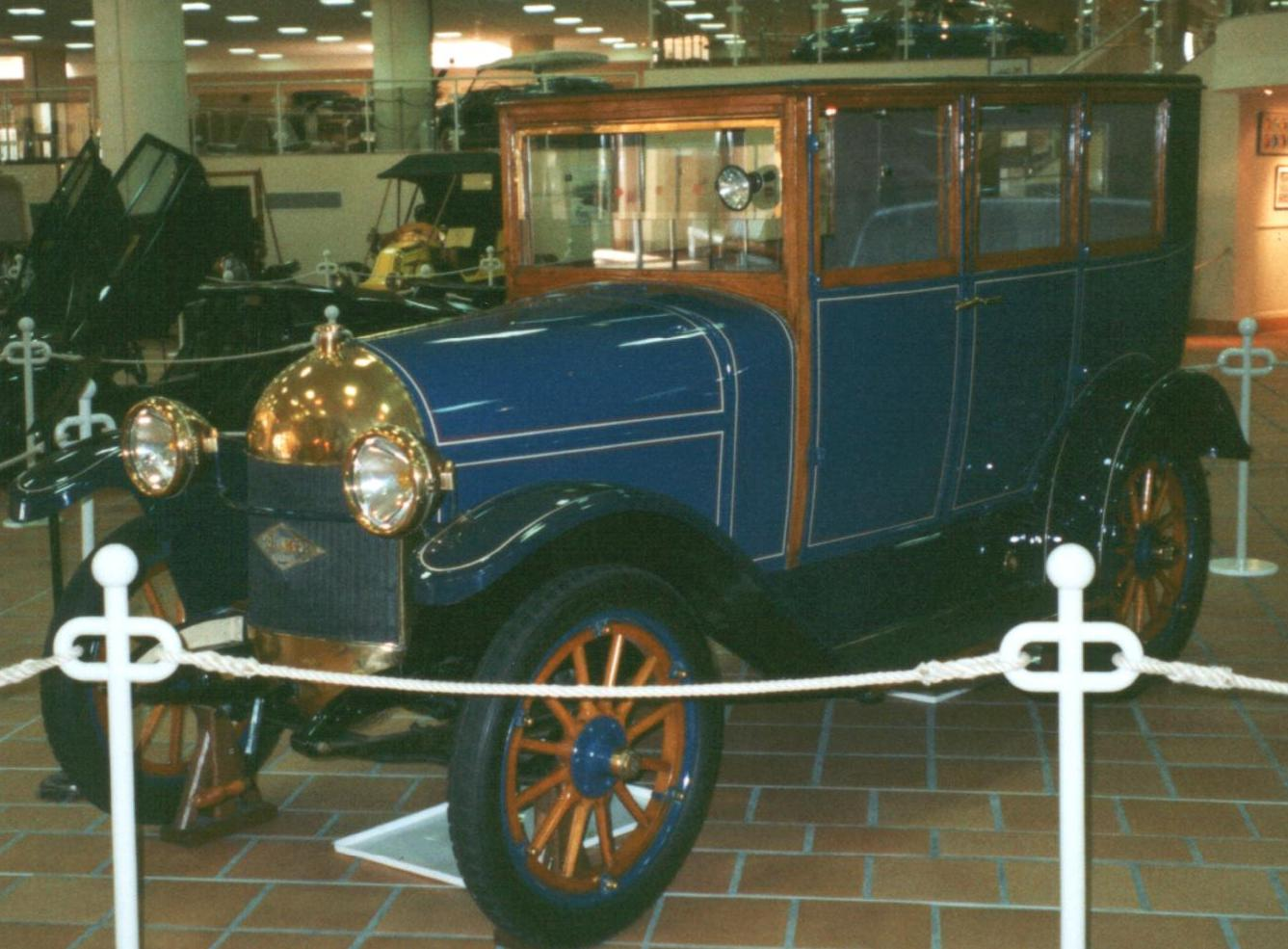
Bellanger 24 CV Type A1 (1921)

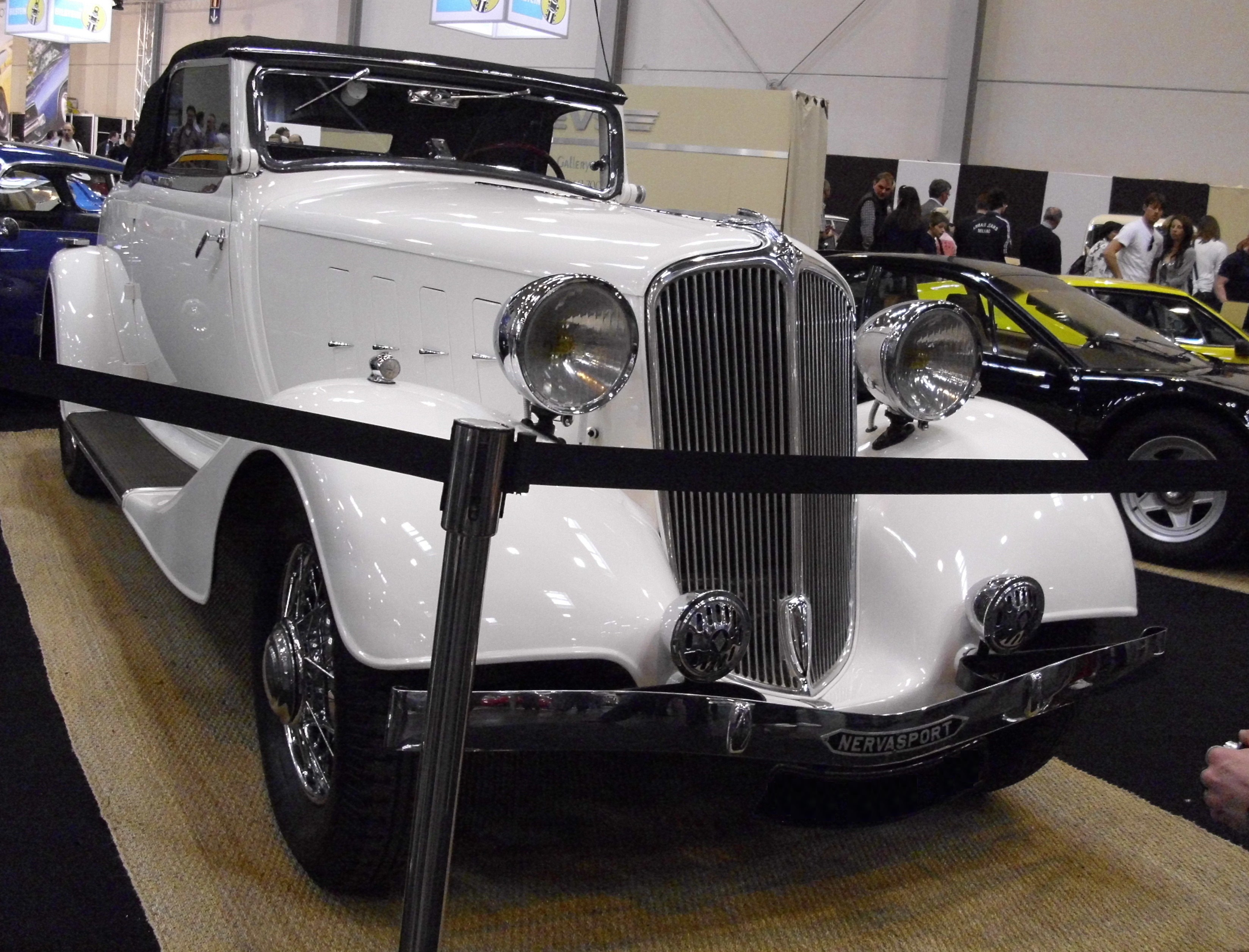
Renault Nervasport (1932)

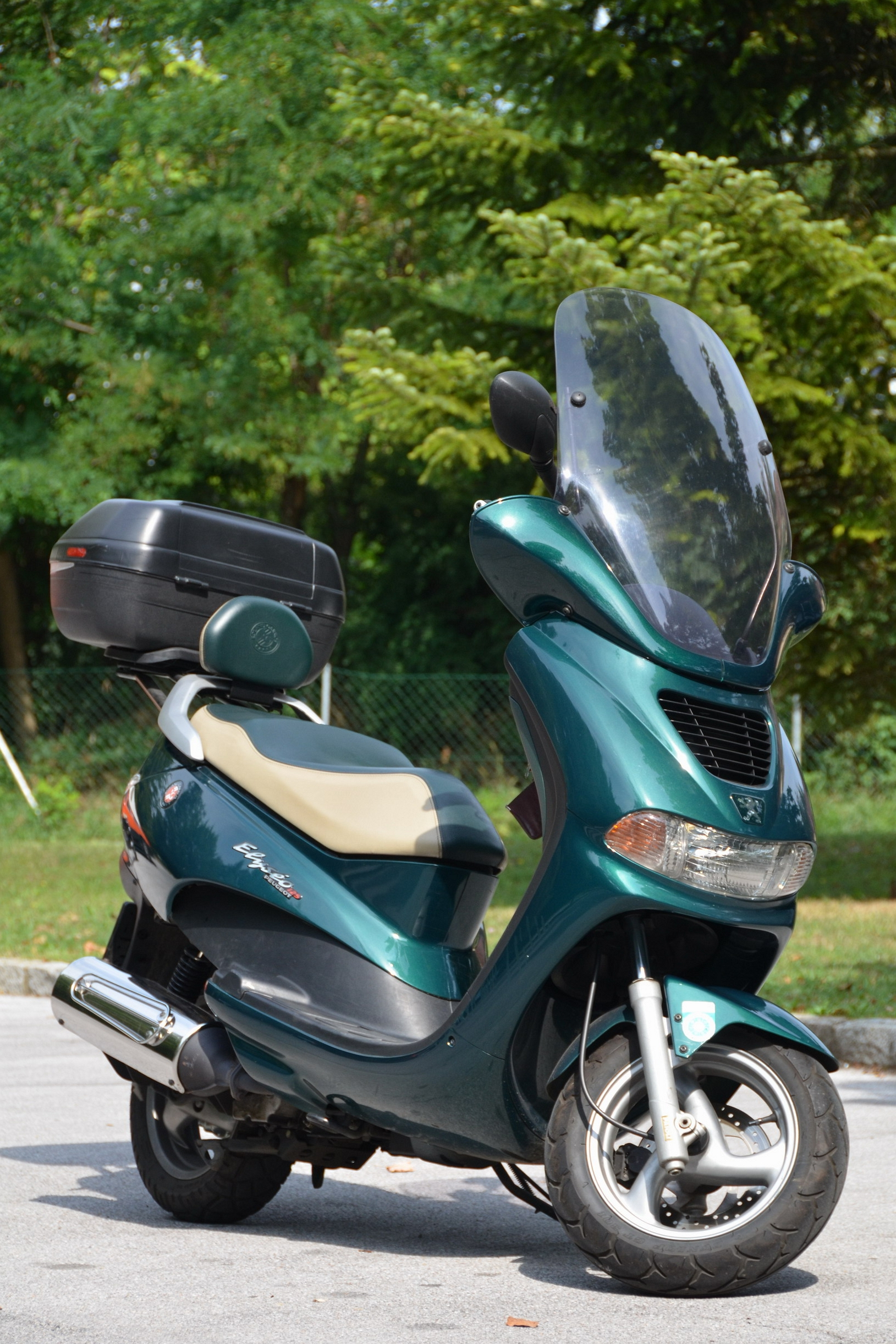
Peugeot Elyséo 125, 'Roland Garros' (2002)

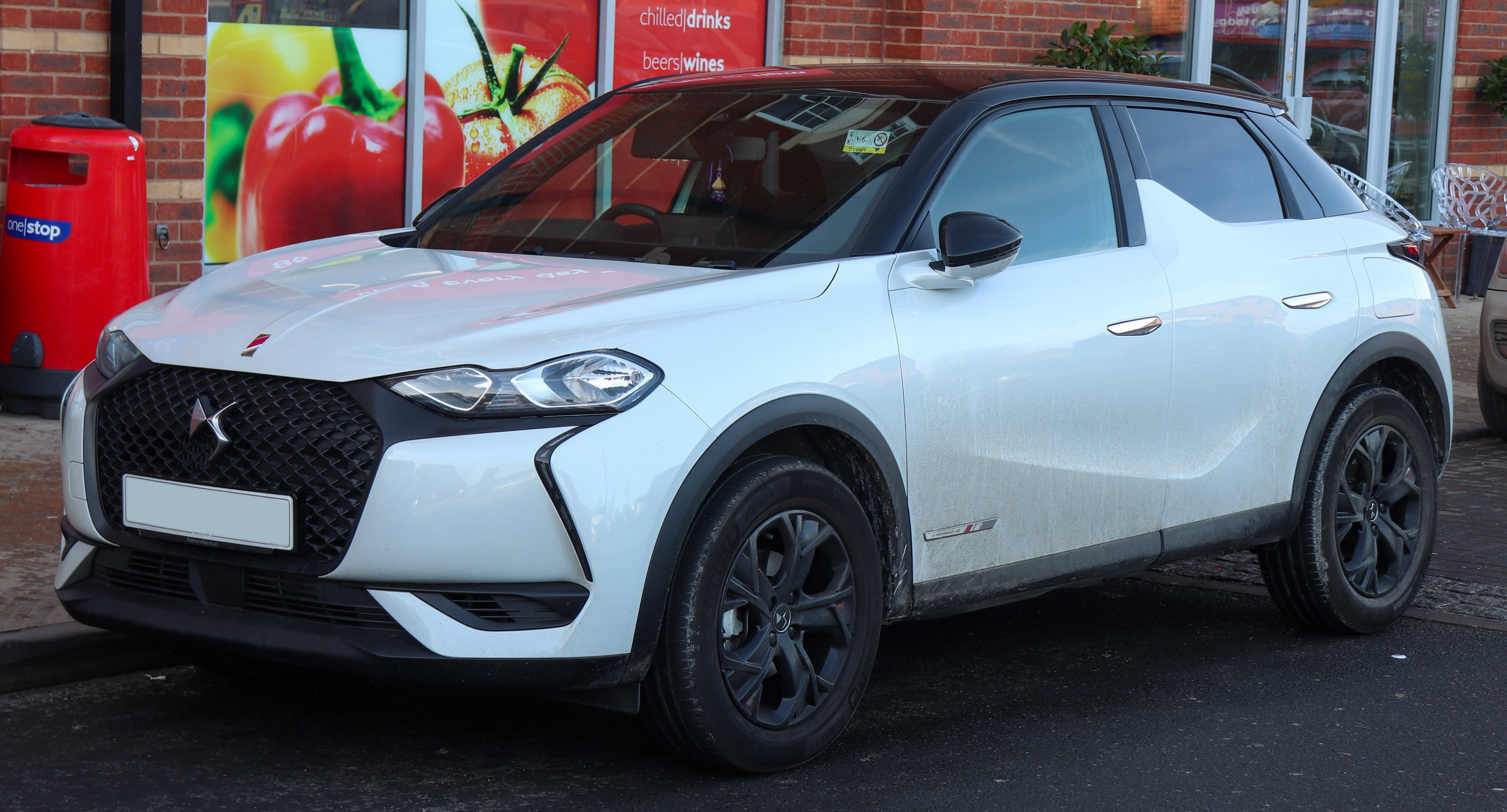
DS 3 Crossback

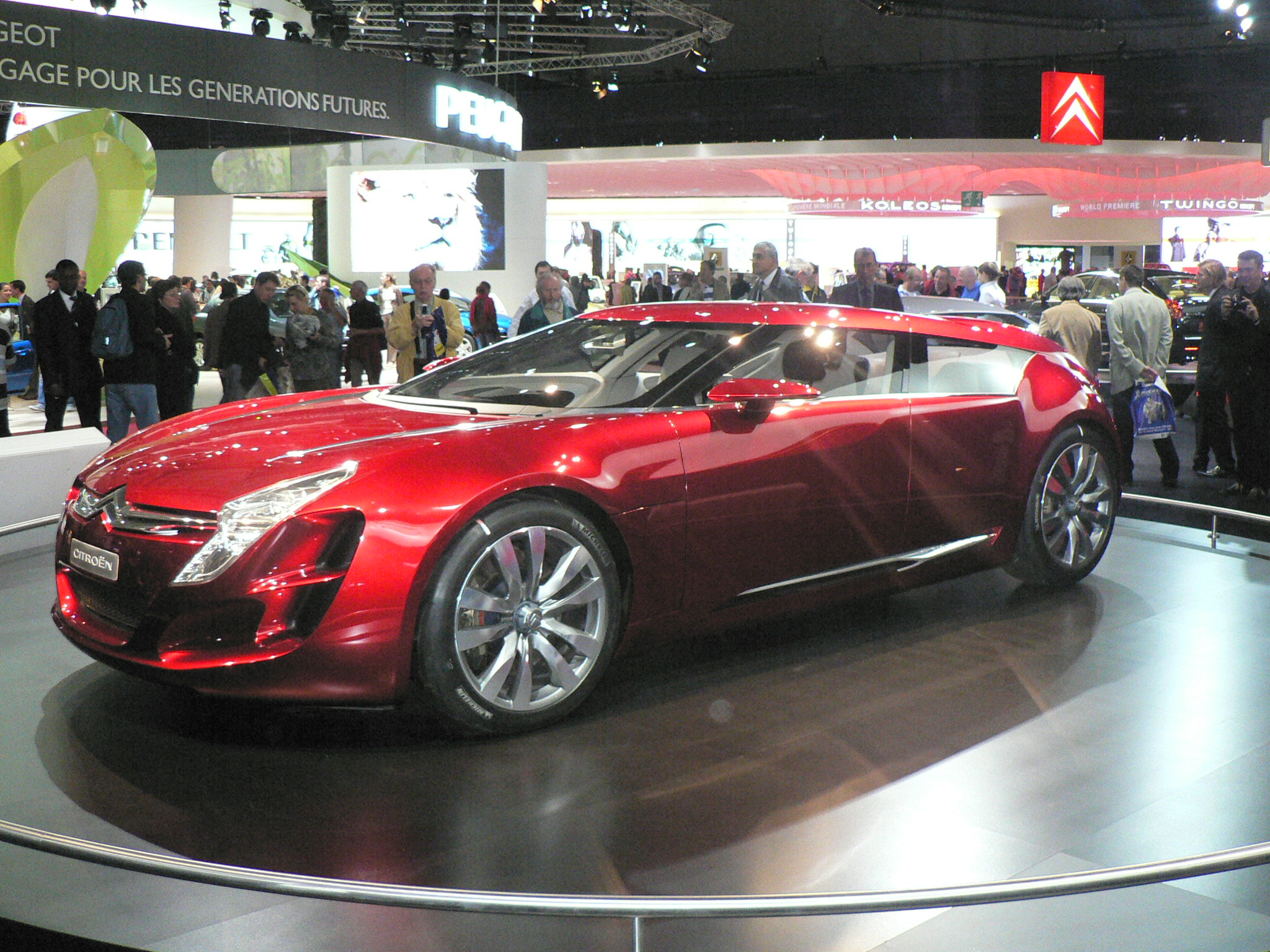
Citroën C-Métisse

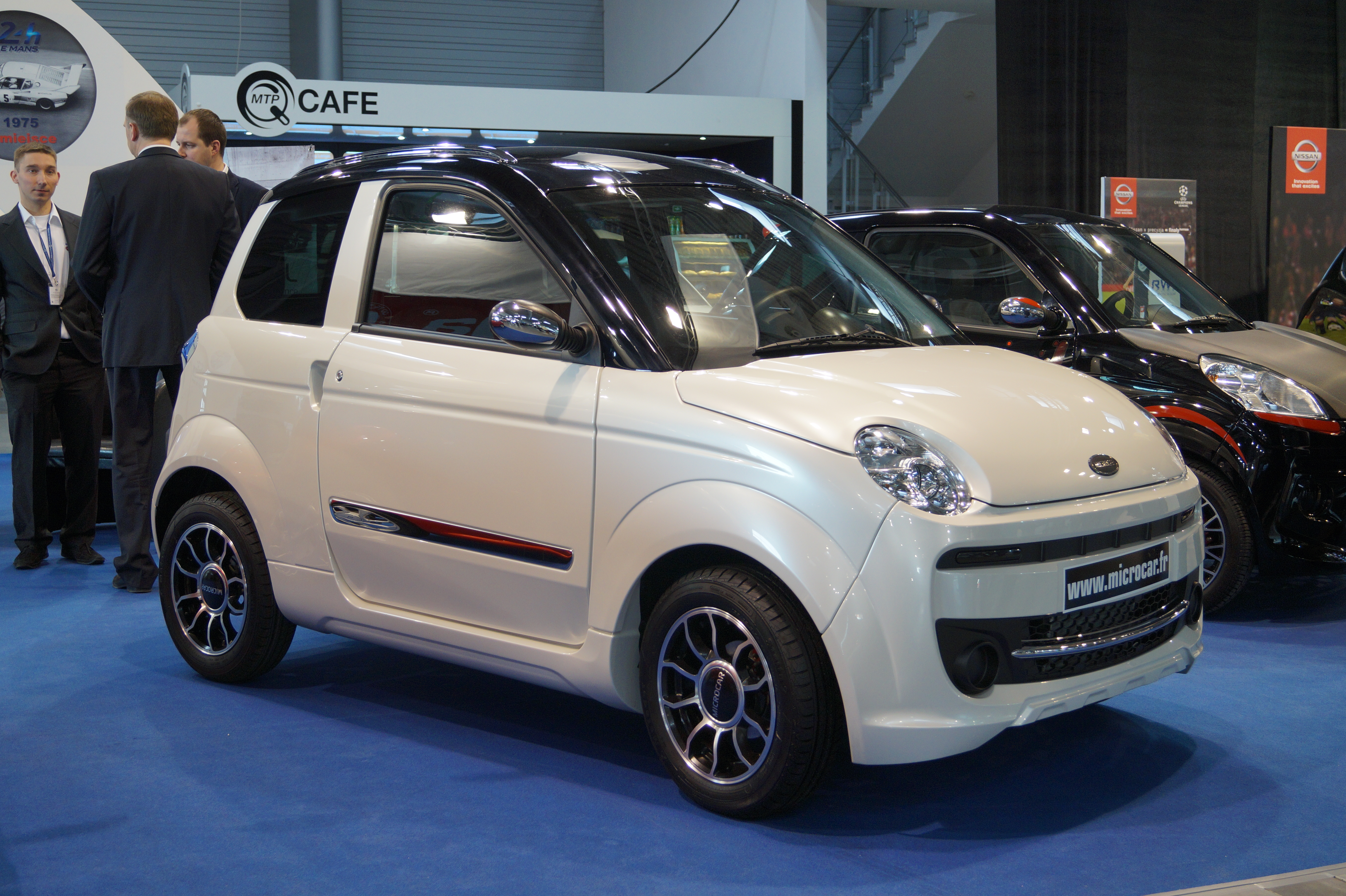
Microcar M.Go 3 Dynamic

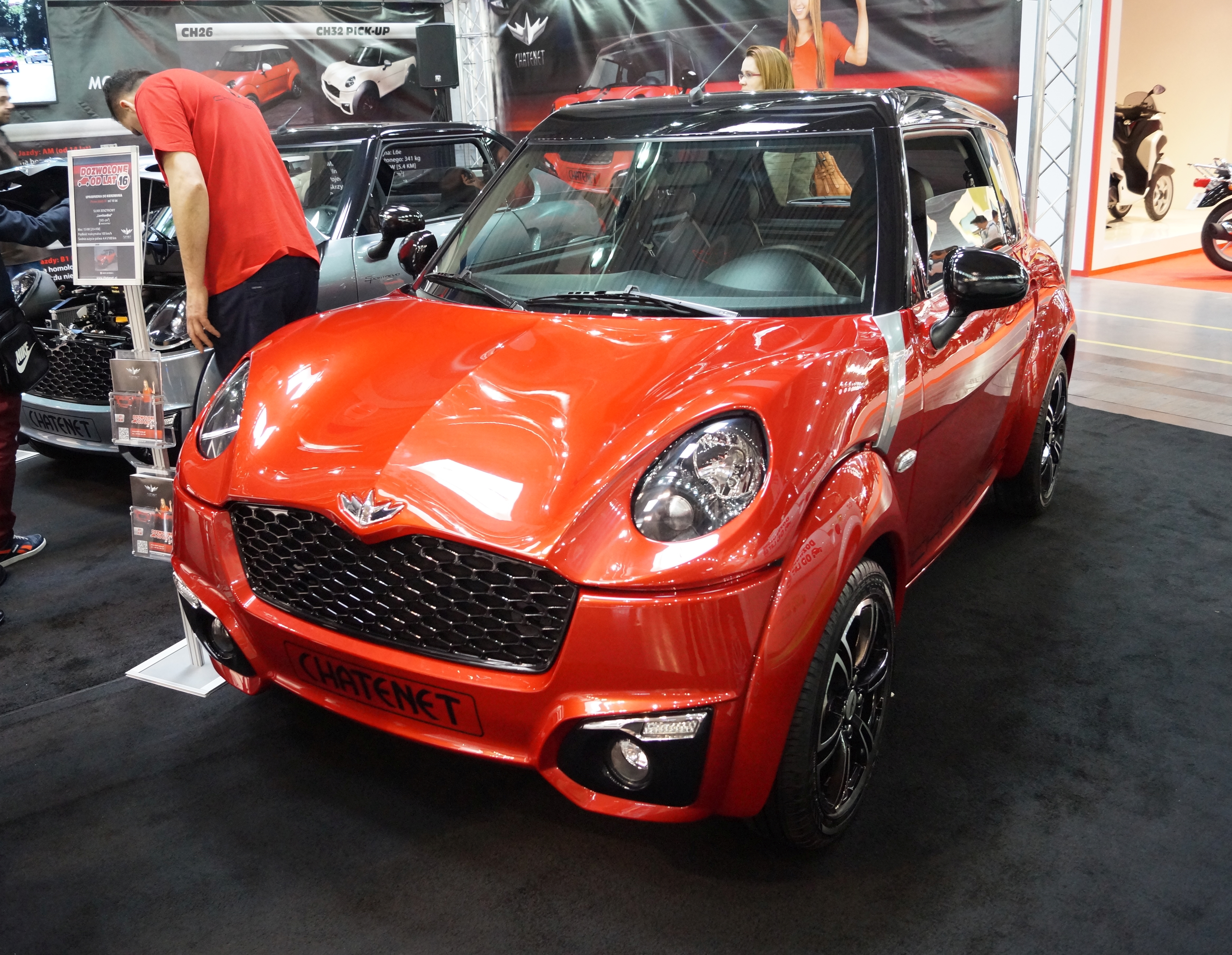
Chatenet CH30

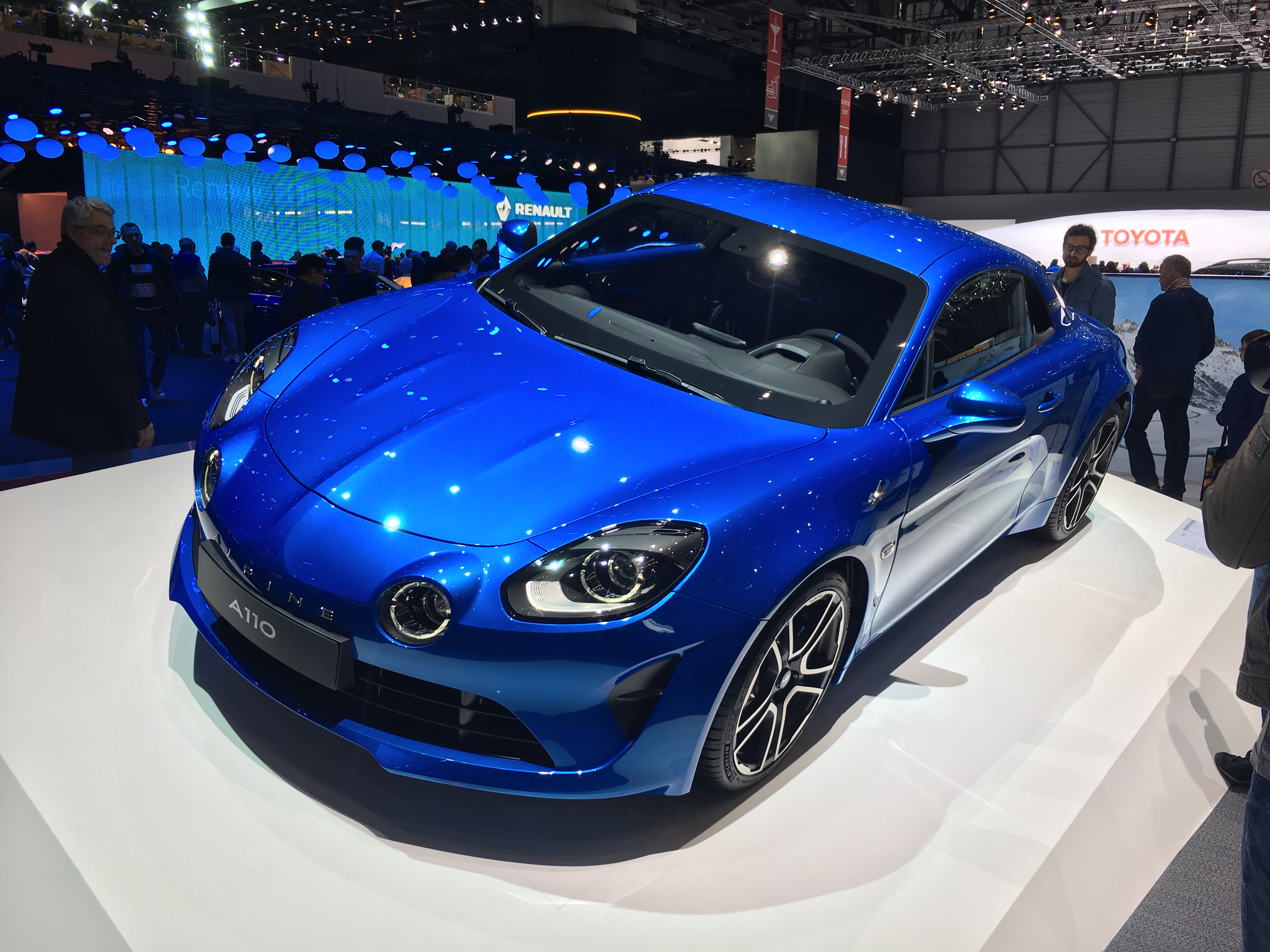
Alpine A110 (2017)

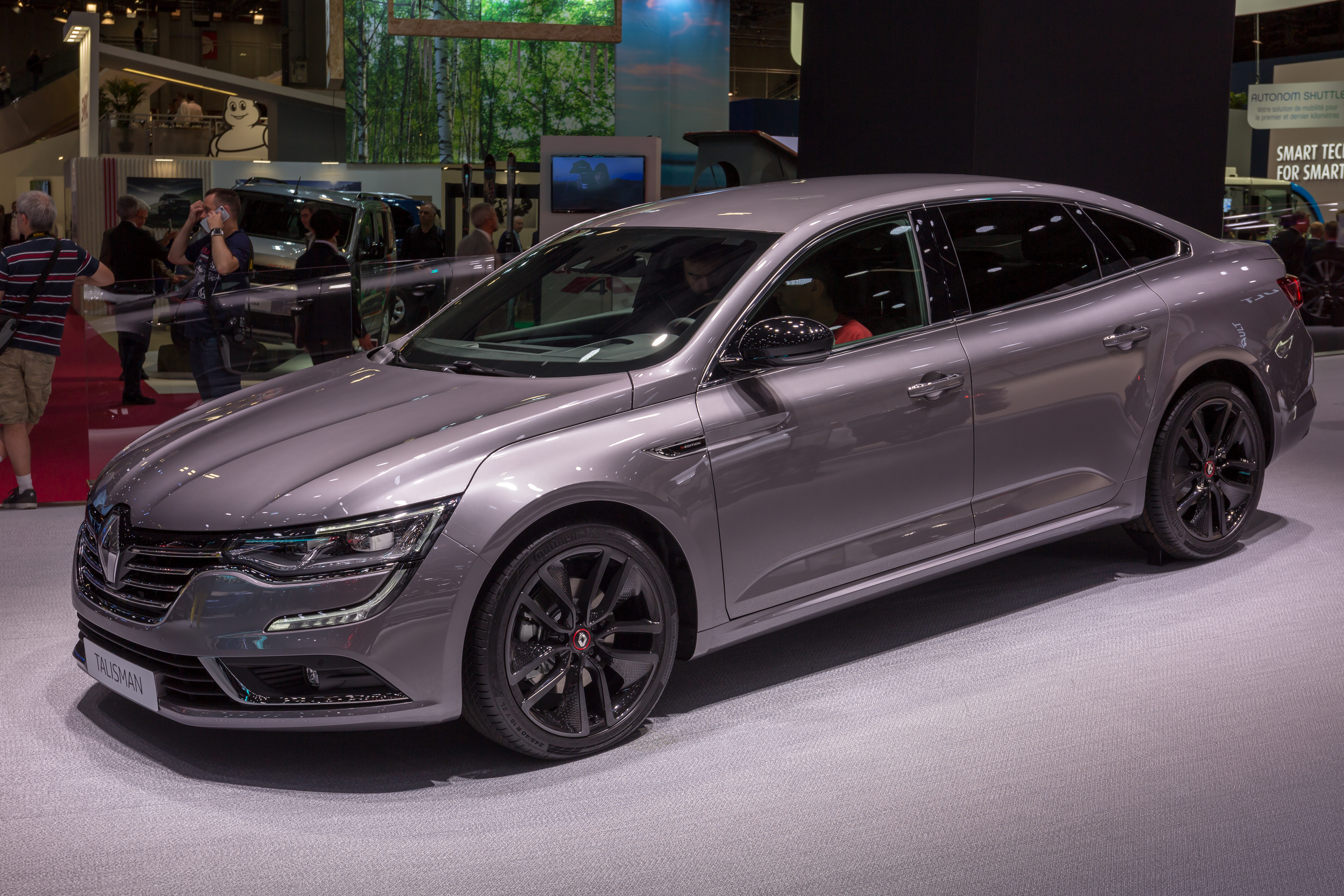
Renault Talisman

== See also ==
- List of automobile manufacturers of France
- French bicycle industry
