= Delage D8 =

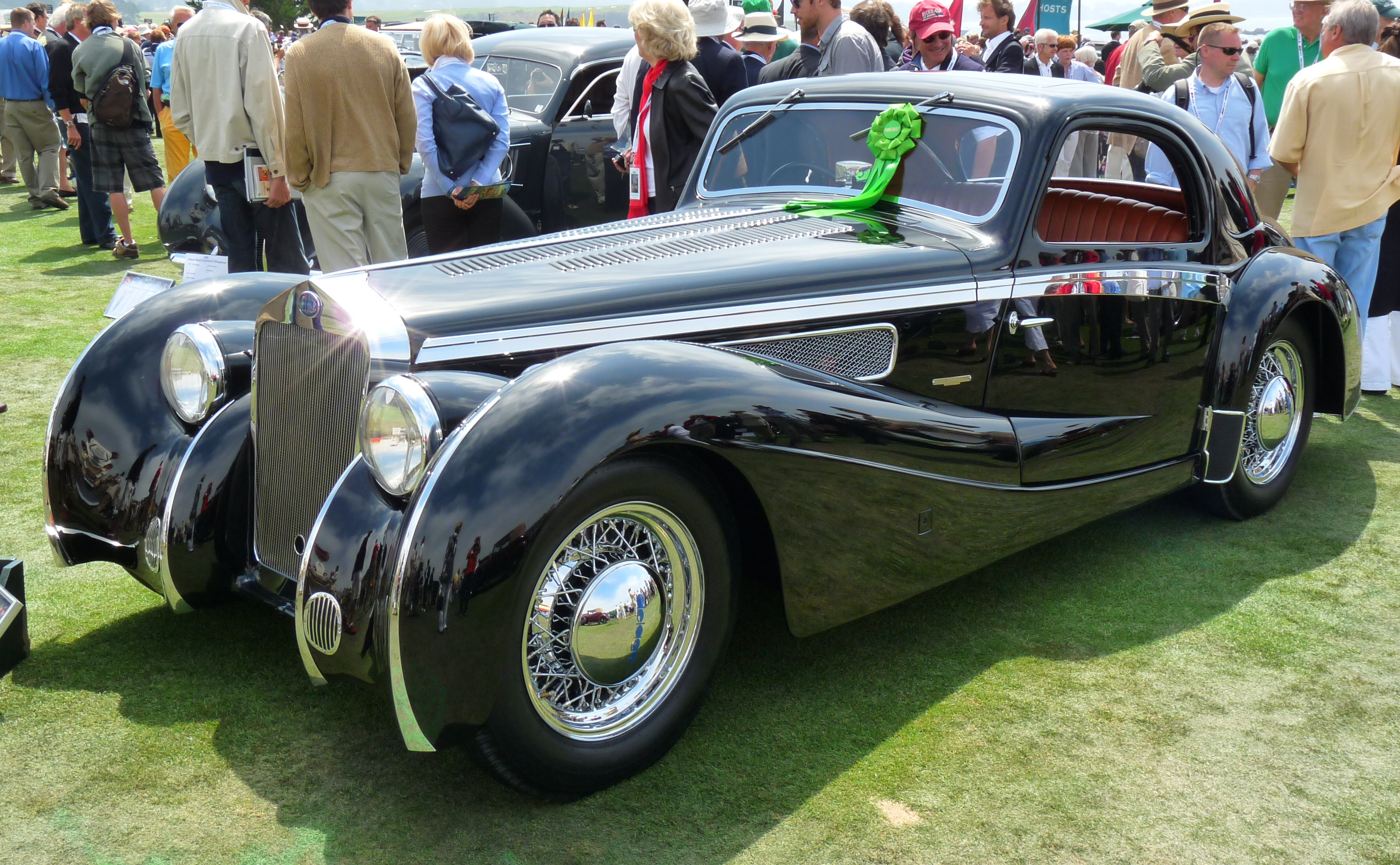
- 1937 Delage D8-120 S Aérosport by Letourneur et Marchand

Overview
- Manufacturer: Delage
- Also called: Delage D8-15 (1933-34); Delage D8-85 (1934-35); Delage D8-105 (1934-35); Delage D8-100 (1936-40); Delage D8-120 (1937-40)
- Production: 1929–1940

Body and chassis
- Body style: coupé, cabriolet, sedan/saloon or roadster bodies

Powertrain
- Transmission: 4-speed manual 4-speed Cotal pre-selector (initially optional, subsequently standard equipment)

The Delage D8 was an eight-cylinder luxury car produced by Delage between 1929 and 1940.

The 4061 cc engine with a bore of 77 mm, and a stroke of 109 mm of the original D8 placed it in the 23CV car tax band which also defined its position high up in the market hierarchy.

Delage provided rolling chassis to be bodied and fitted out by prestigious carroussiers such as Letourneur et Marchand and Chapron operating (in most cases) in the Paris area. The result was that the D8 appeared, throughout its life, in a wide variety of (frequently) elegant coupé, cabriolet, sedan/saloon or roadster shapes.

== Chronology ==
The D8 was introduced late in 1929 as a replacement for the opulent Delage GLS, but in view of the range of body types (and, subsequently, of engine sizes) with which it was offered it can also be seen as a replacement for some versions of the Delage DM.

It was launched when the European economy was still reeling from the aftermath of the 1929 stock market crashes – though cars at this level were never intended to sell in large numbers. By taking sales from other top end auto-makers such as, in particular, Bugatti, the D8 became one of the best known products of what subsequently came to be known as a "golden age" for low-volume expensive and luxurious cars in France.

== Chassis ==
Two versions of the D8 were launched: the "D8 Normale" and the short-wheelbase "D8 S".

The "D8 Normale" was offered in three different wheelbase lengths: 3,167 mm (124.7 in), 3,467 mm (136.5 in), and 4,066 mm (160.1 in) – which would accommodate body lengths of more than 5 meters. The short-wheelbase "D8 S" was optimized for manoeuvrability and handling in sports car applications.

Both versions were produced until 1933.

== Engine ==
The "Delage D8" was powered by a straight 8 engine which was a first both for Delage and for the French auto-industry. The 4061cc engine featured an overhead centrally positioned camshaft and a listed maximum output of 102 hp (76 kW) at 3,500 rpm for the "D8 Normale" and 120 hp (89 kW) in the "D8 S" version. Power was delivered to the rear wheels through a four speed manual gear-box featuring synchromesh on the upper two ratios.

Although performance varied according to vehicle weight, top speed listed for the "D8 Normale" was 120 km/h (75 mph), with 130 km/h (82 mph) listed for the "D8 S".

== Brakes and suspension ==
The drum brakes operated on all four wheels. The suspension was traditional, involving rigid axles front and back with semi-elliptic leaf springs and "friction dampers".

Delage D8

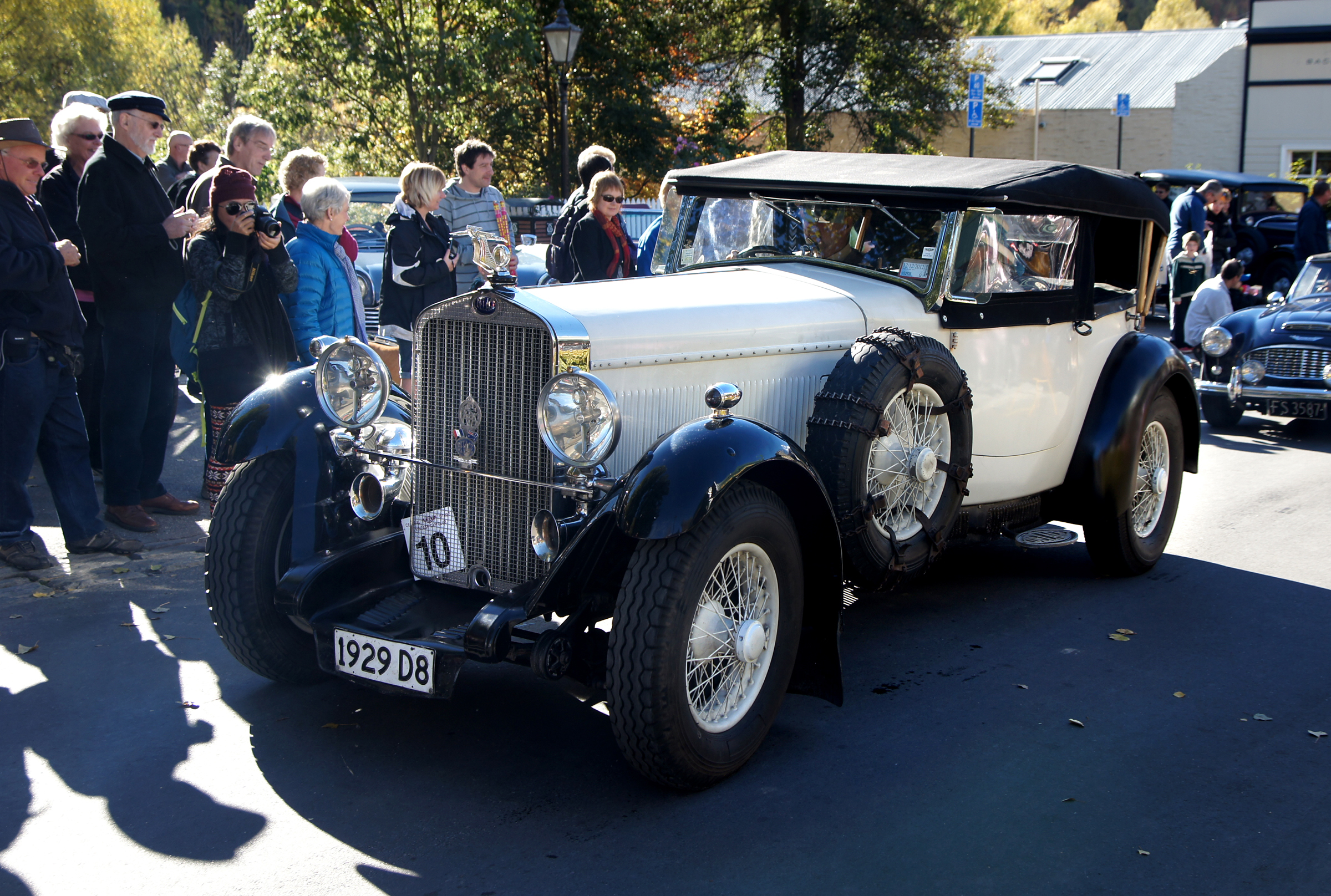
1929 Delage D8

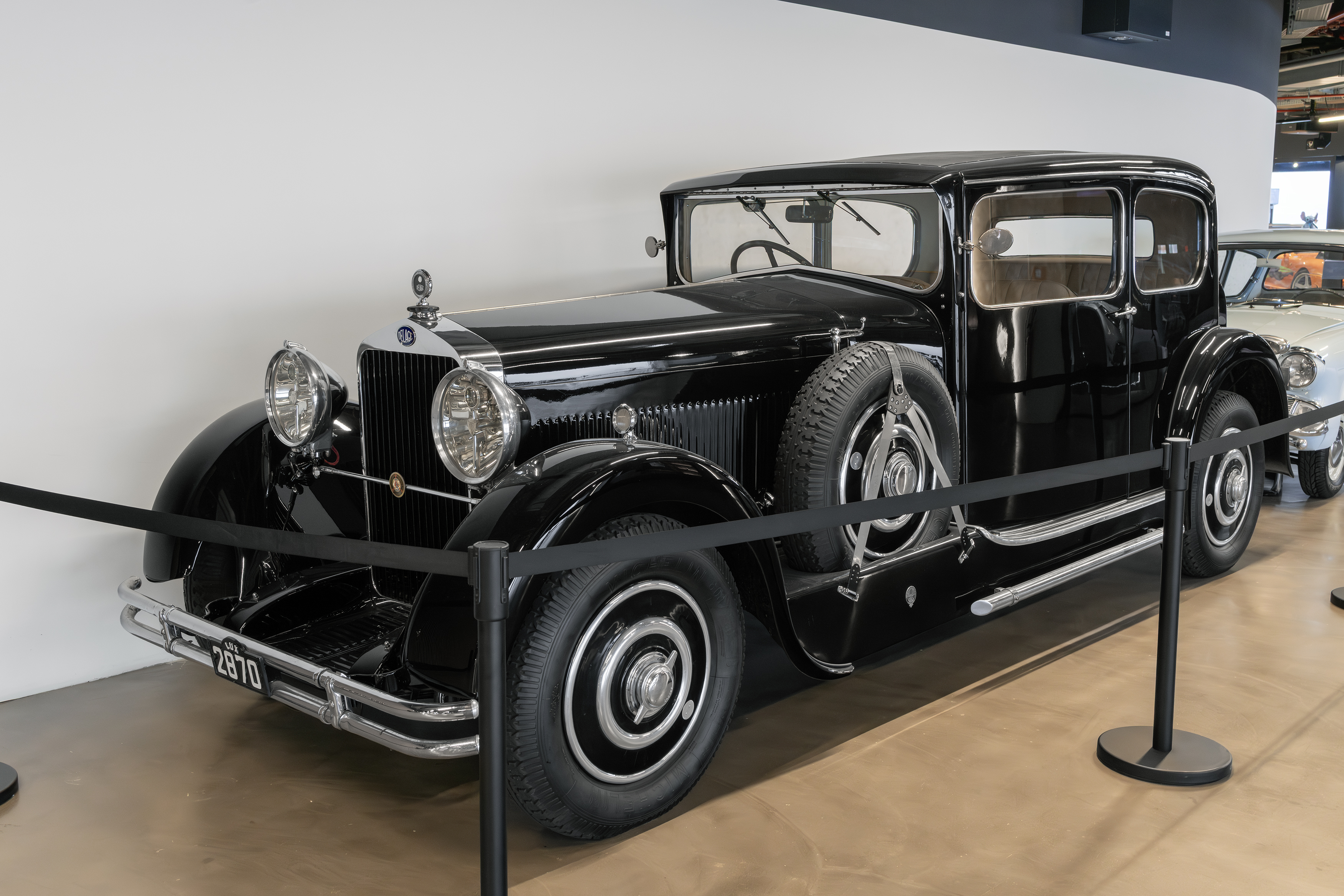
1930 Delage D8

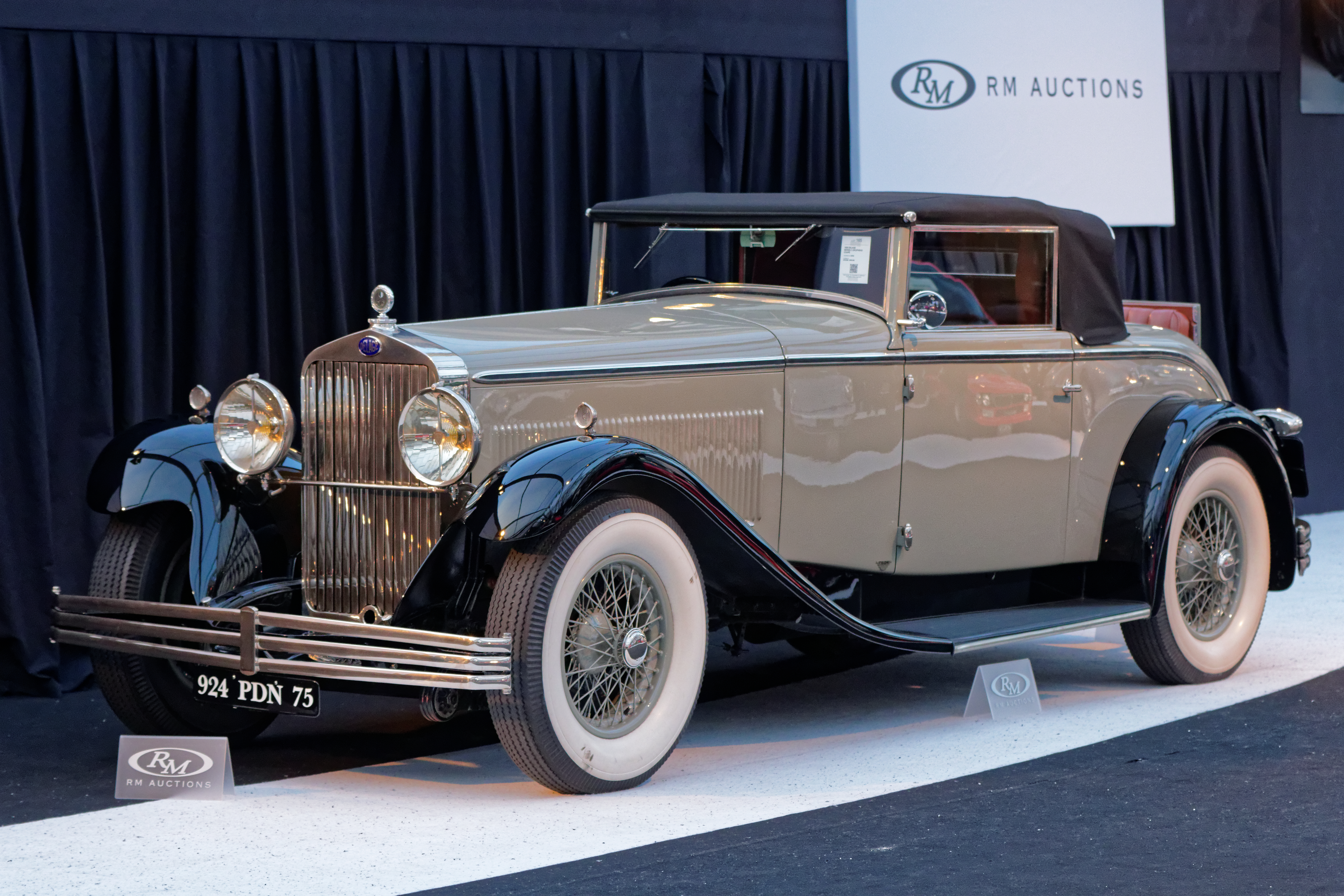
1930 Delage Type D8 C Figoni spider cabriolet (chassis 33 783)

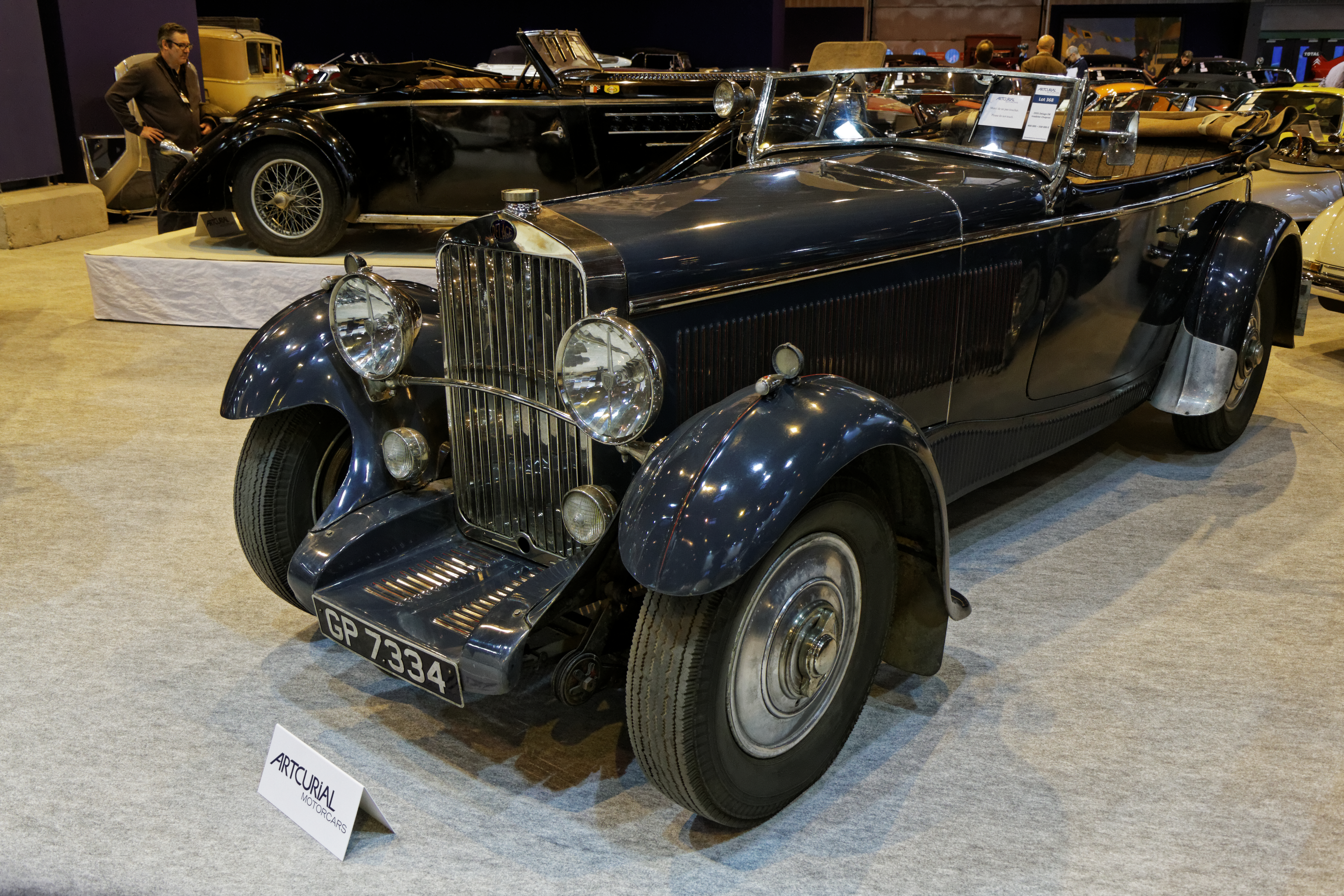
1931 Delage Type D8 Chapron torpedo Sport (chassis 34 785)

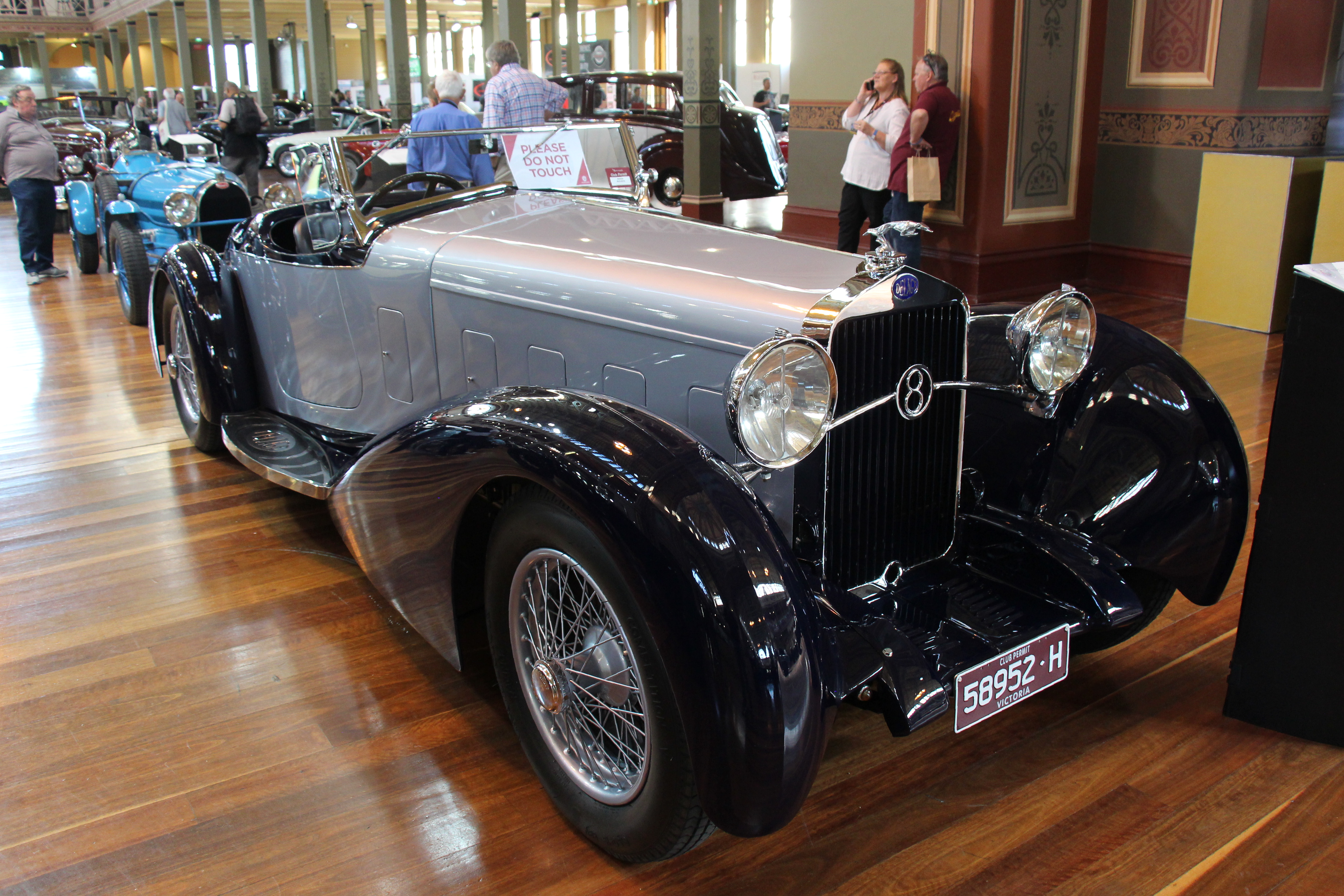
1931 Delage D8 S Roadster

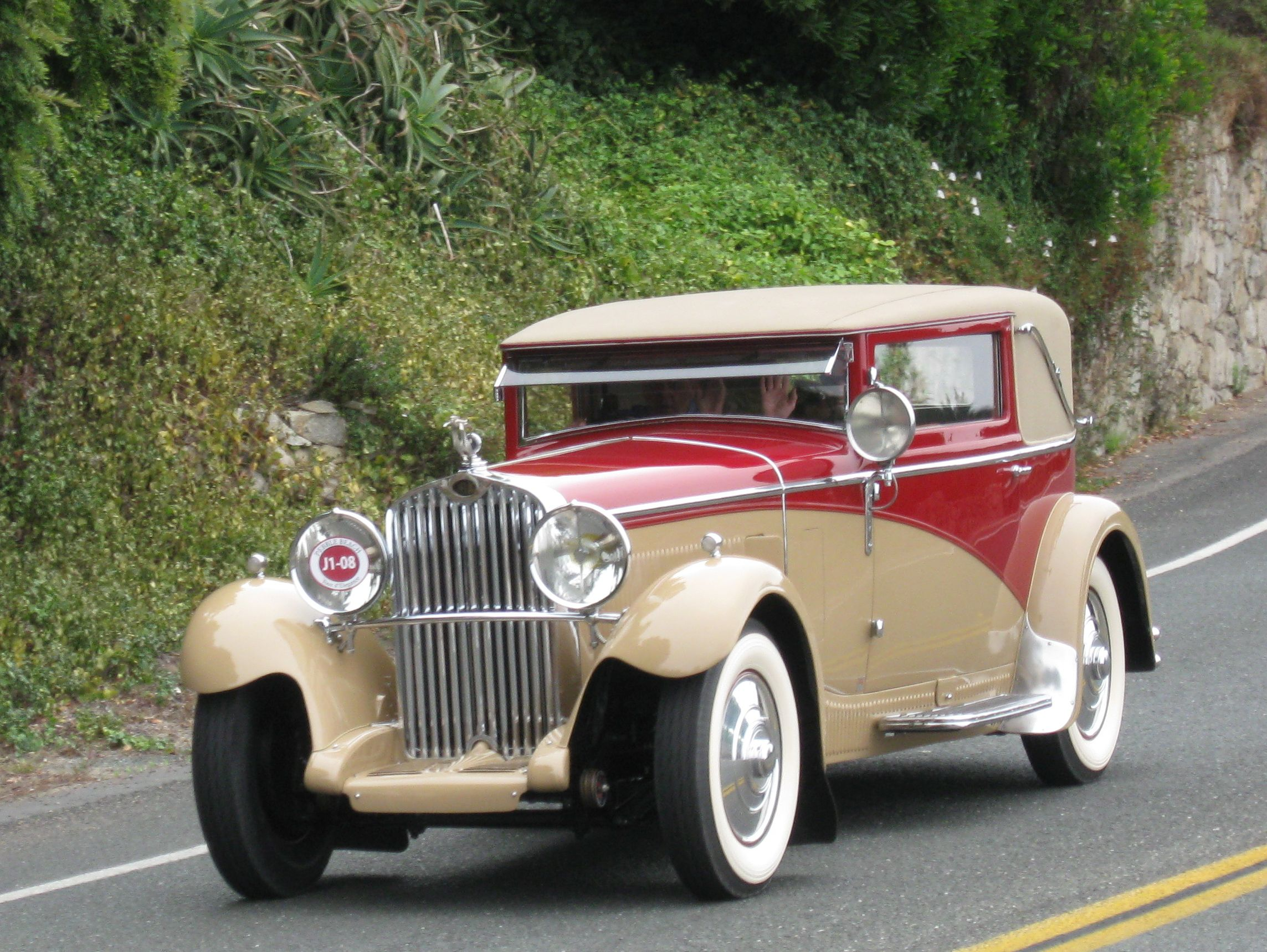
1931 Delage Type D 8 Chapron "Faux-Cabriolet" coupe Victoria (chassis 33 321)"

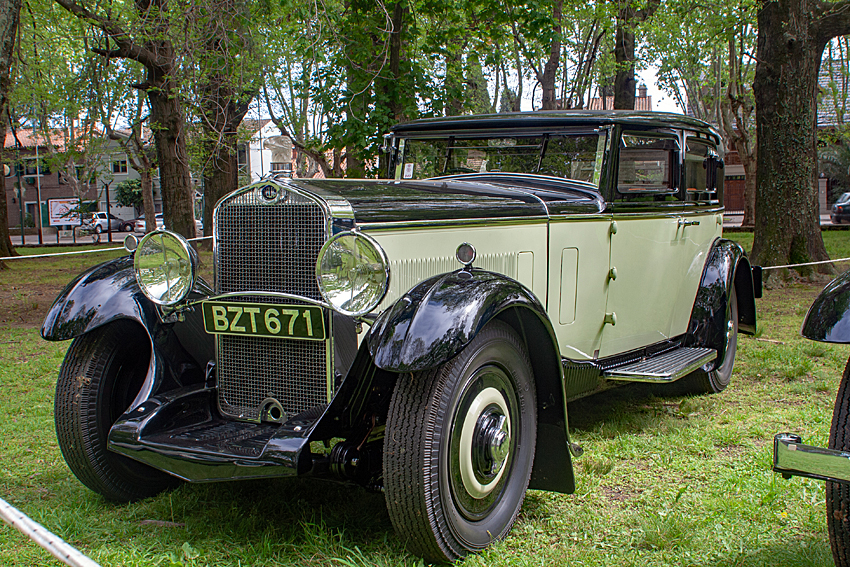
1932 Delage D8 with Lalique mascot

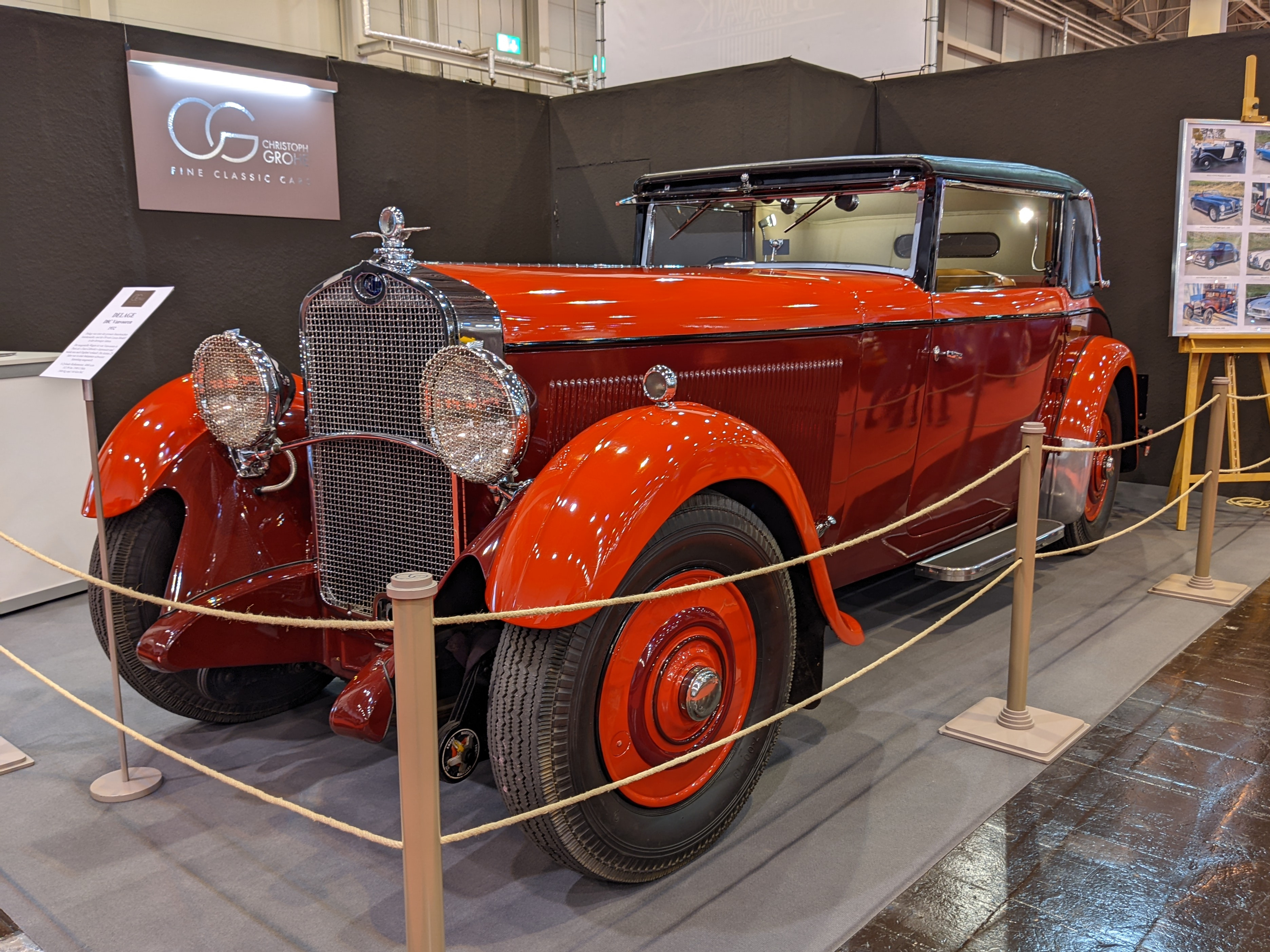
1932 Delage Type D8 C Vanvooren "Faux-Cabriolet" Coupe (chassis 34 737)

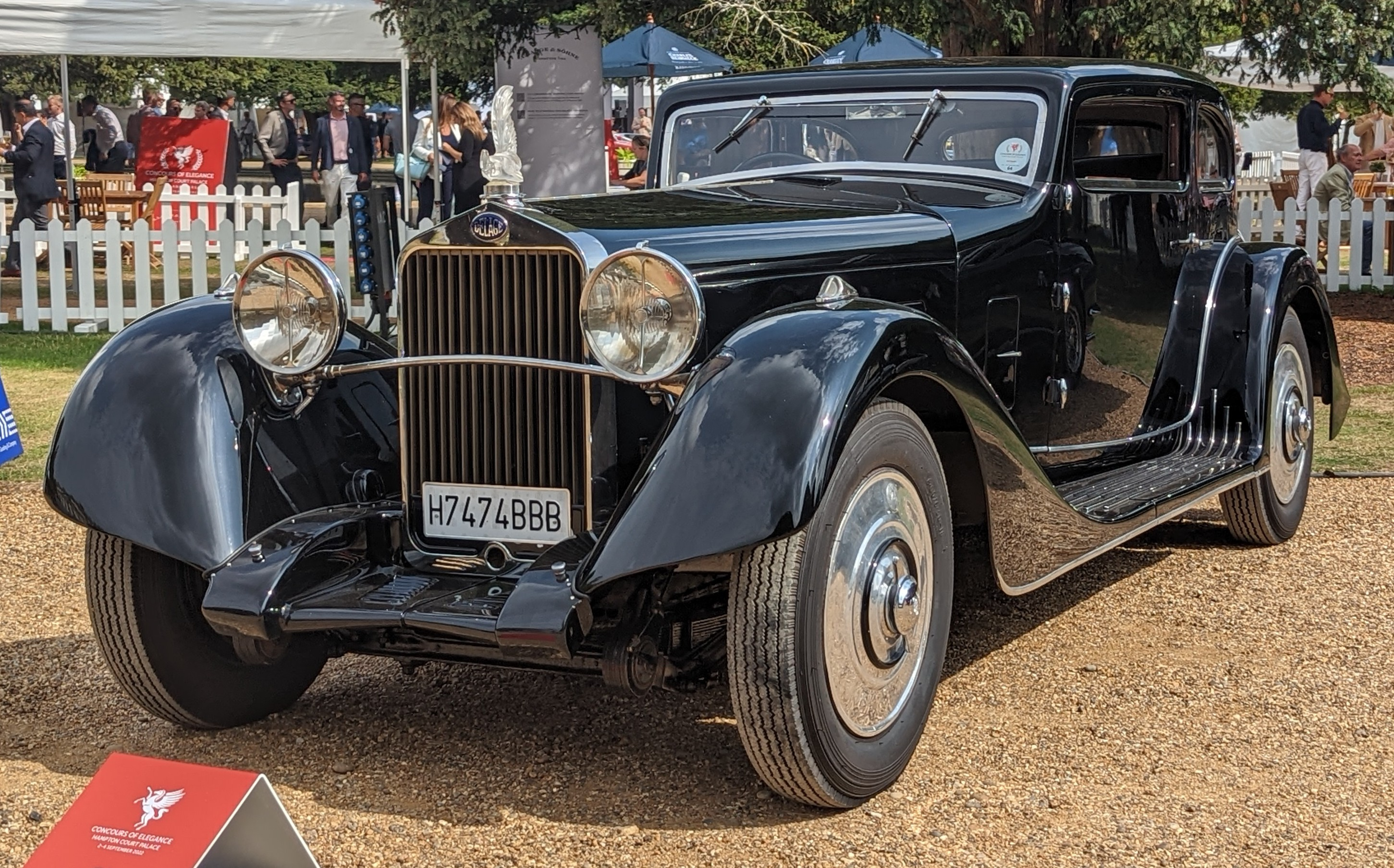
1933 Delage Type D8 S Letourneur & Marchand coach (chassis 38 186)

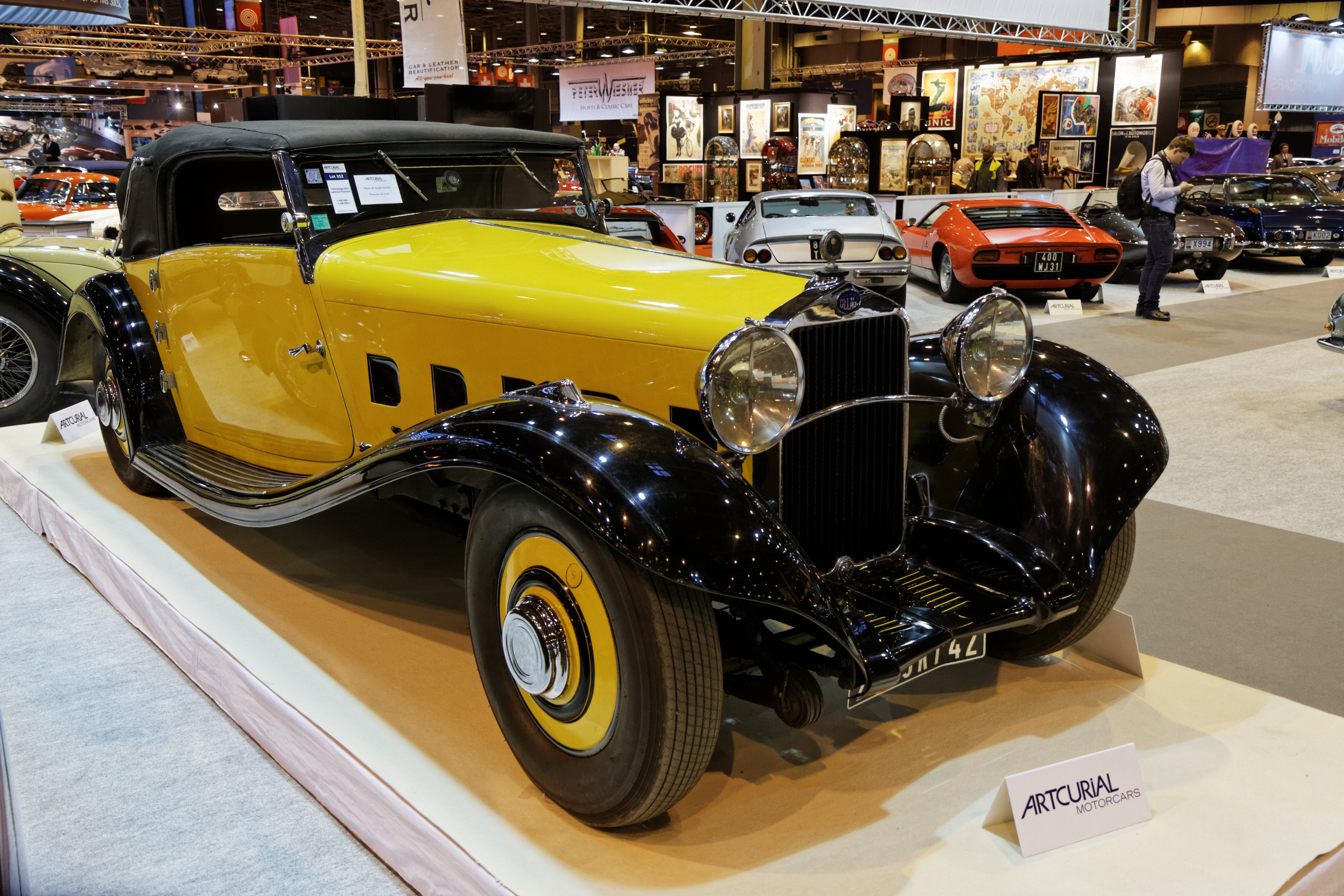
1933 Delage Type D8 S Pourtout cabriolet (chassis 38 237)

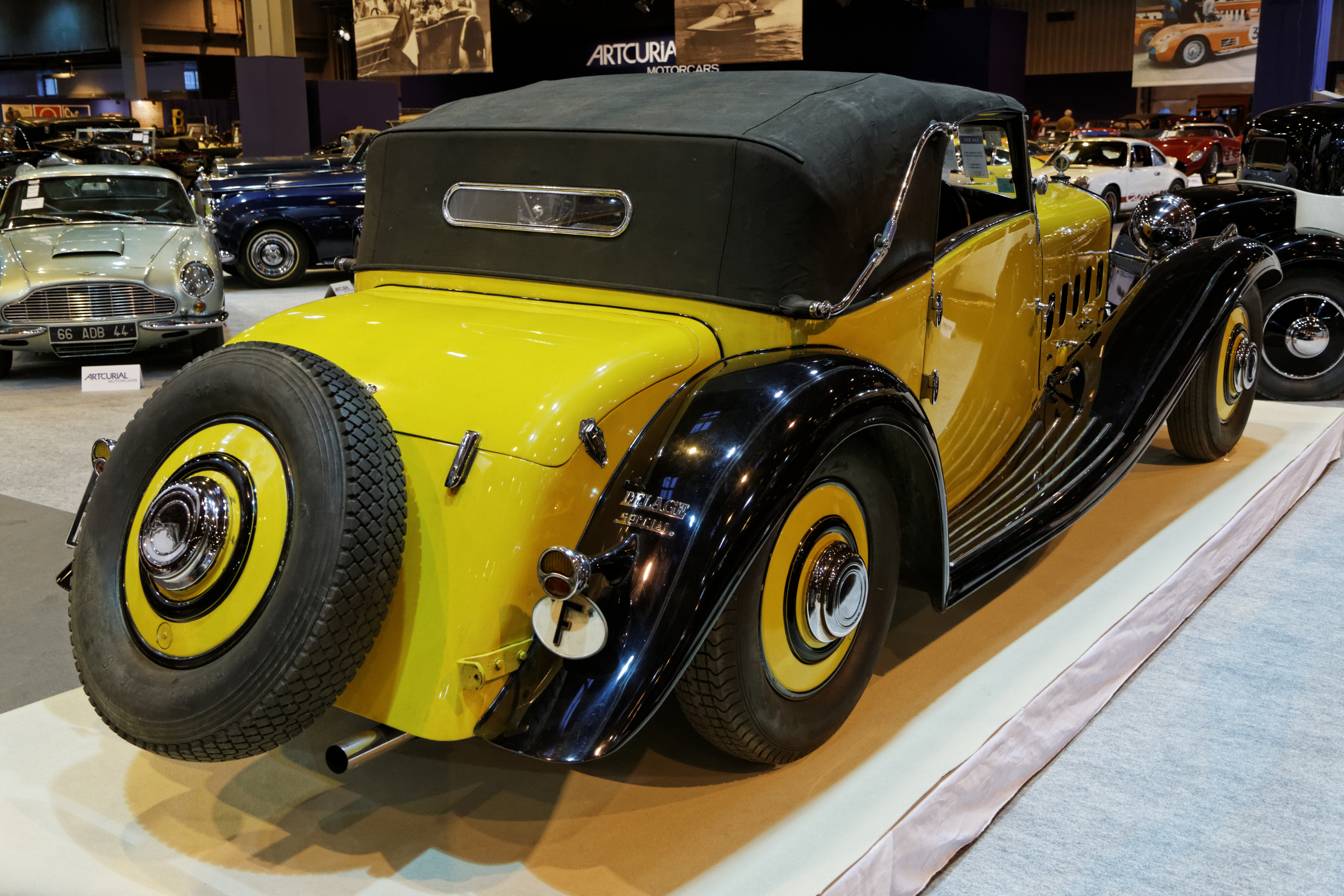
1933 Delage Type D8 S Pourtout cabriolet (chassis 38 2

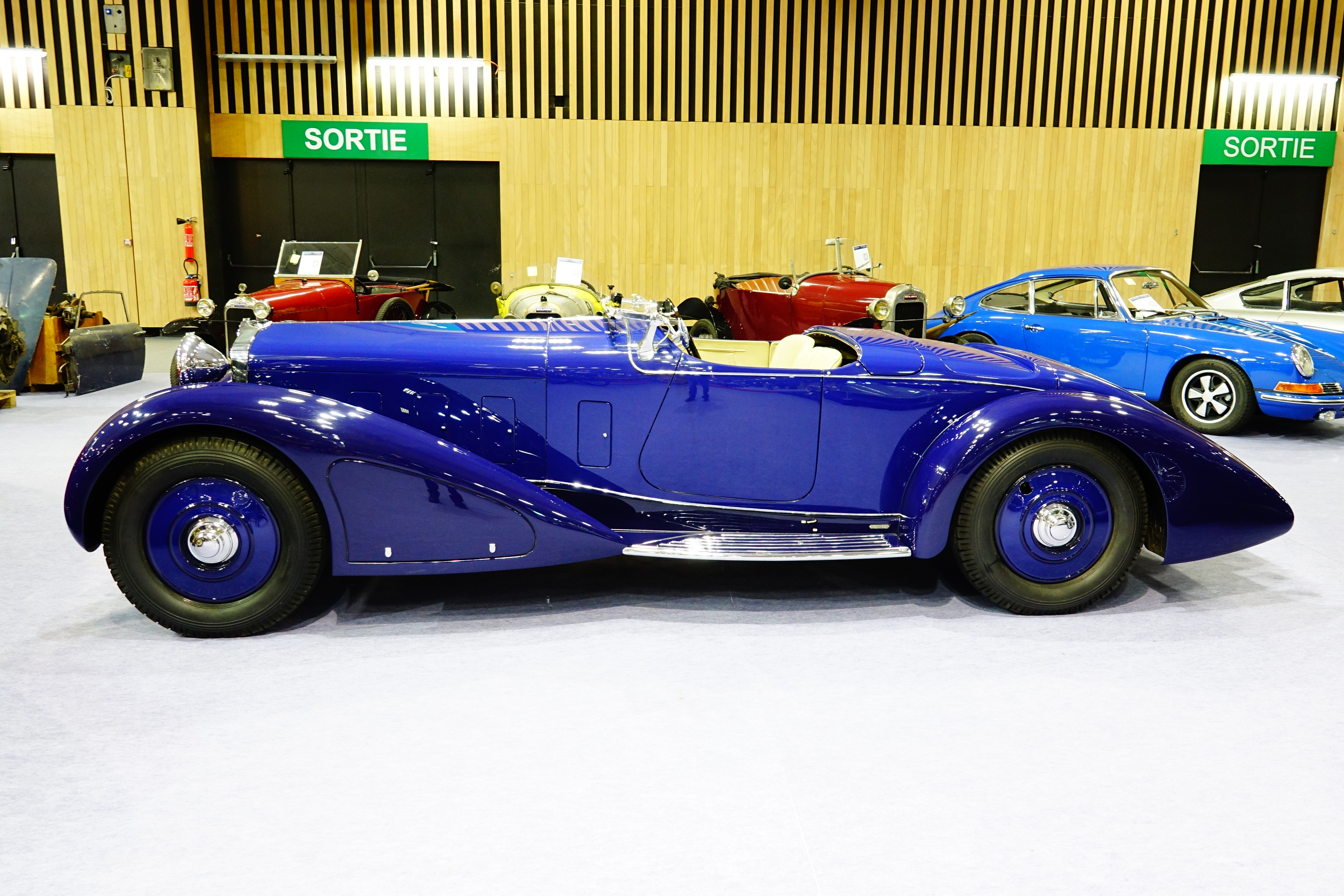
1934 Delage D8 S Auto Classique Touraine roadster (chassis 39 432)

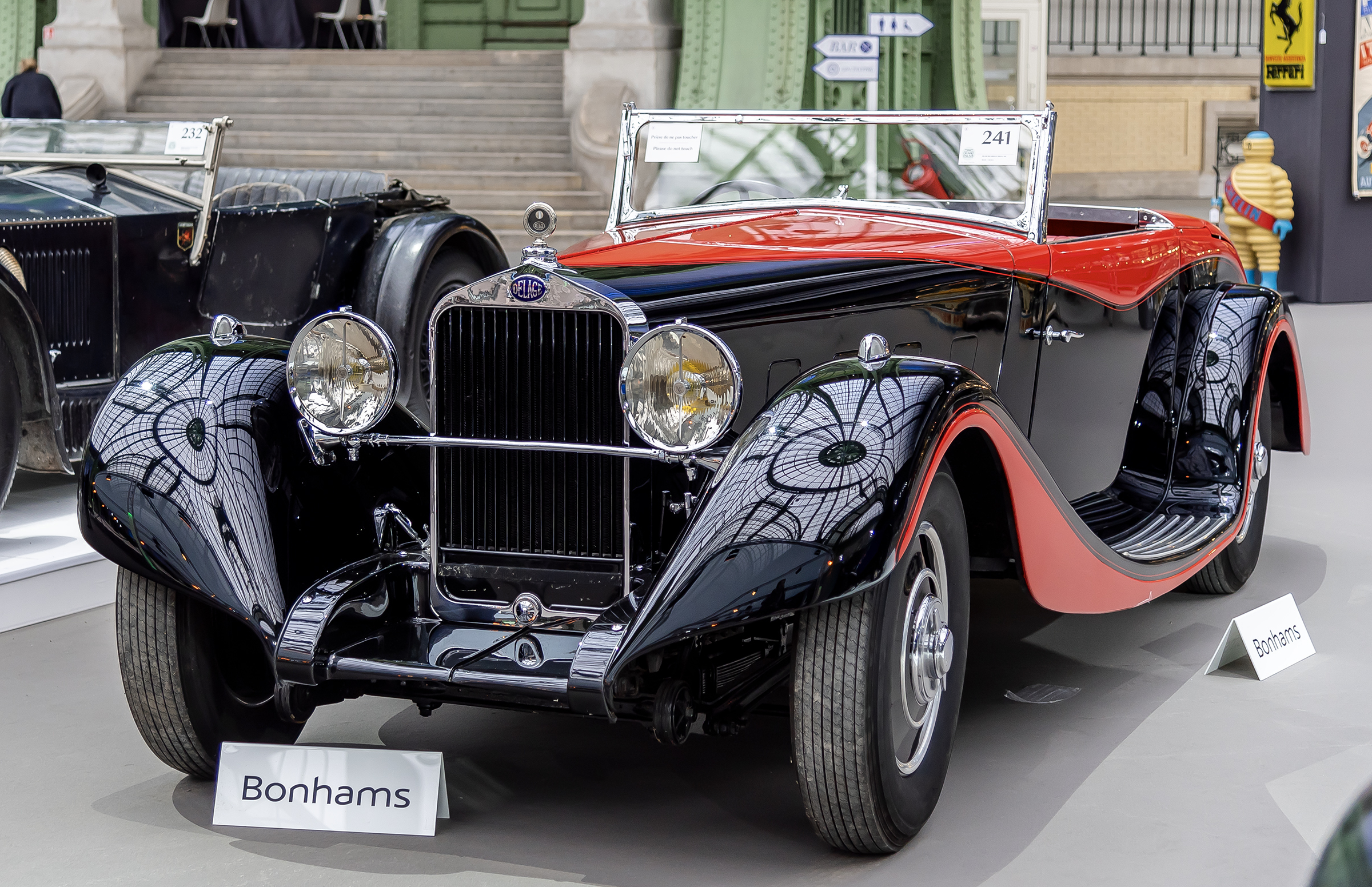
1935 Delage Type D8 S Chapron cabriolet Special (chassis 39 332)

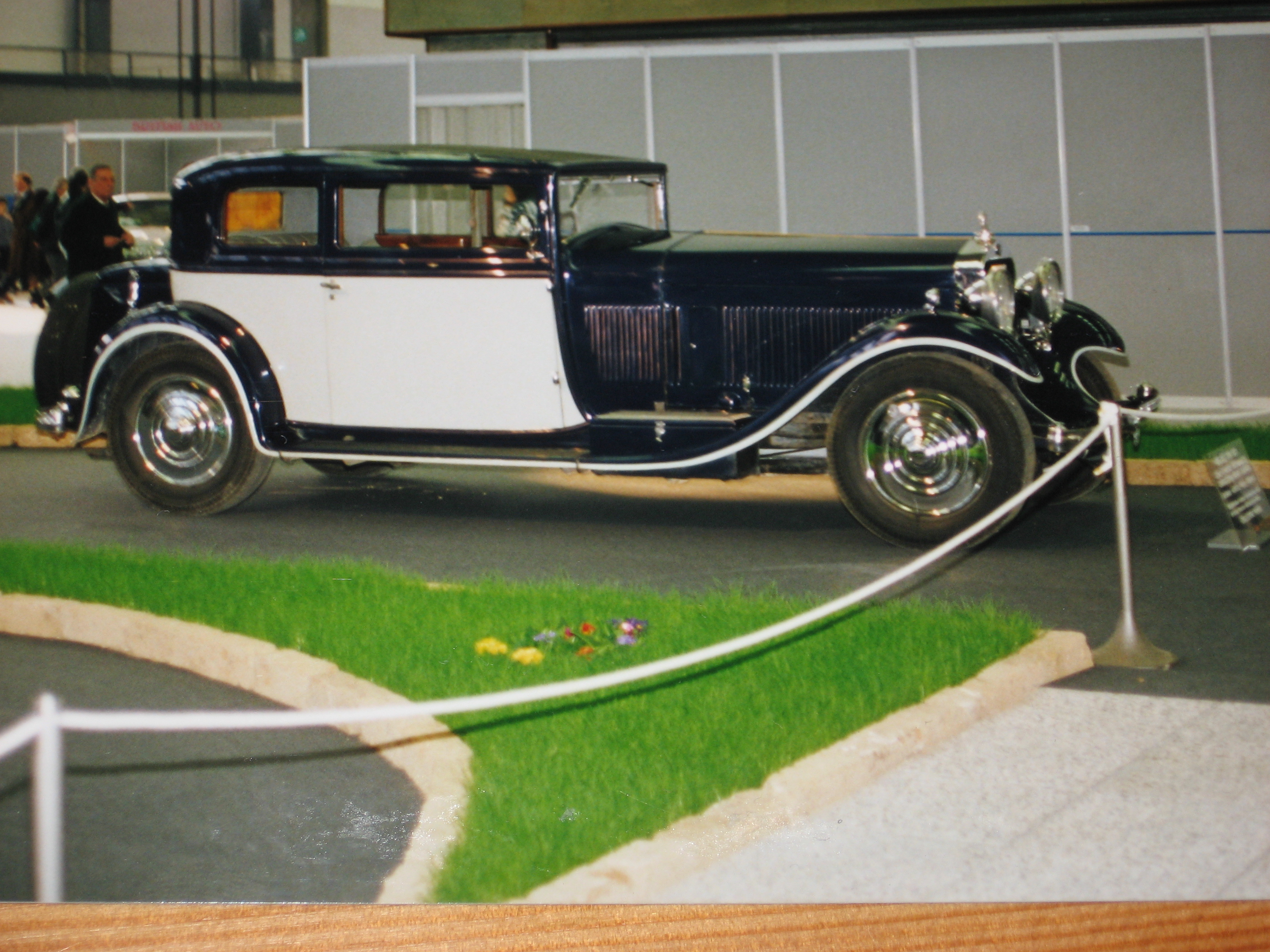
Delage-D8 Limousine

== Further developments ==
=== Delage D8-15 (1933 – 1934) ===
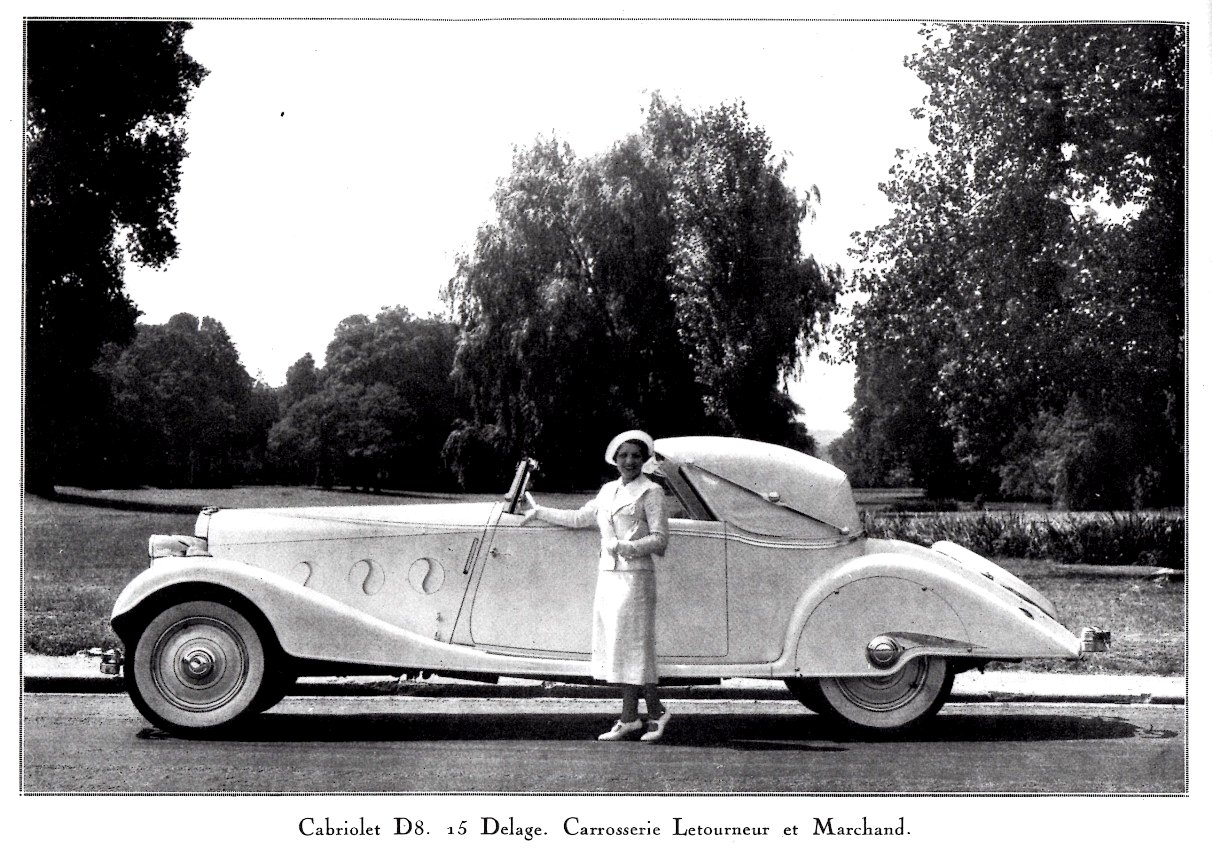
Delage D8-15 Cabriolet with coachwork by Letourneur & Marchand (1935)

In 1933, Delage introduced the D8-15 in which the size of the 8-cylinder engine had been reduced to 2,668 cc (162.8 cu in). The "-15" suffix referred to the 15 CV car tax band in which the smaller engine placed the car. The lesser performance of this version of the Delage D8 moved the model downmarket in the direction of volume automakers such as Citroën who were already working on a 16 CV six-cylinder version of their newly introduced Traction Avant model (although the project seems to have been a low priority for Citroën and the car in question would only appear in the market, initially very cautiously, in June 1938).

The 15CV Delage D8, like the original 23CV version, was produced both in “-Normale" versions and in a shorter wheelbase “-S" version. However, the Delage D8-15 had been withdrawn by the end of 1934.

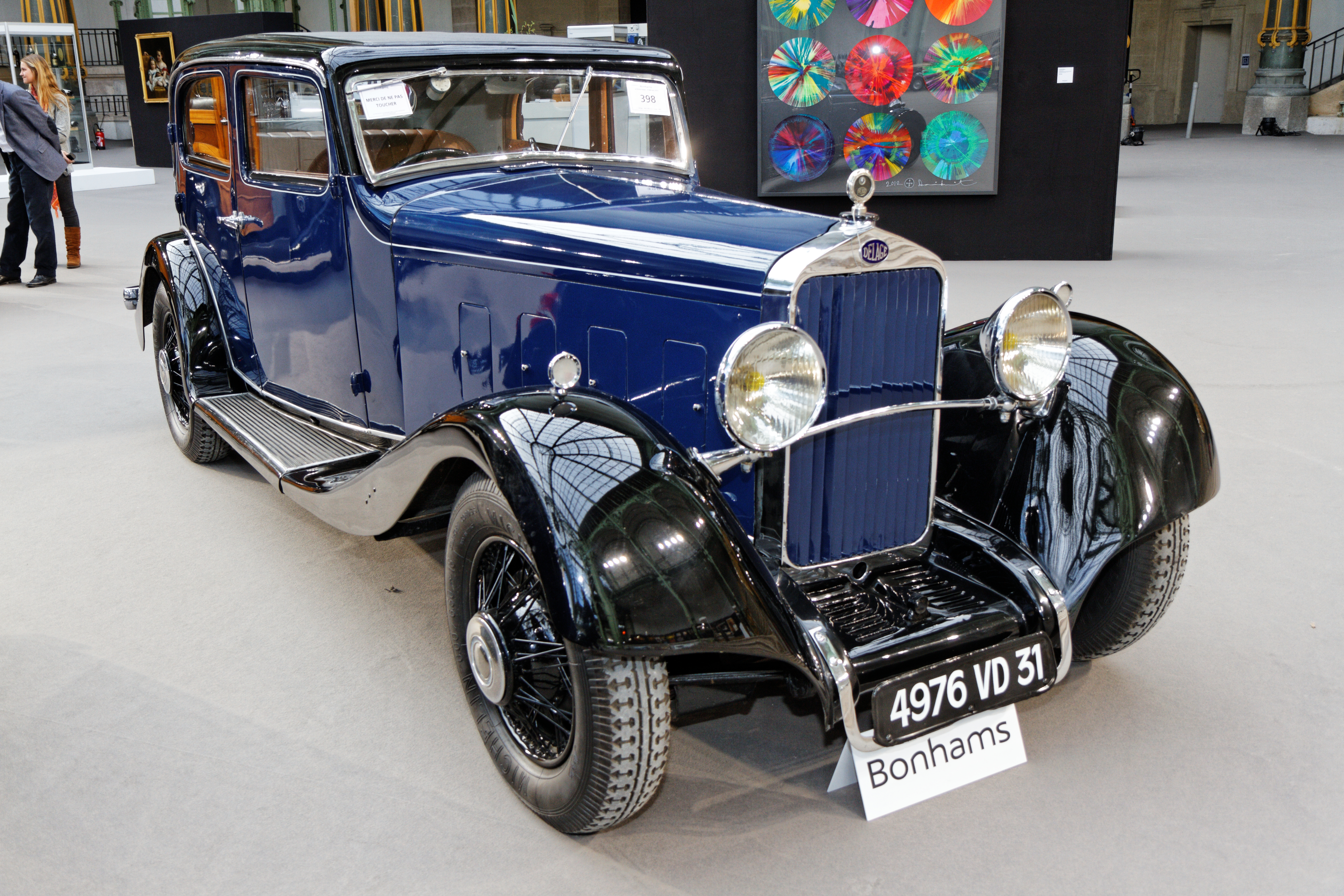
1934 Delage D8 15 Pillarless Saloon

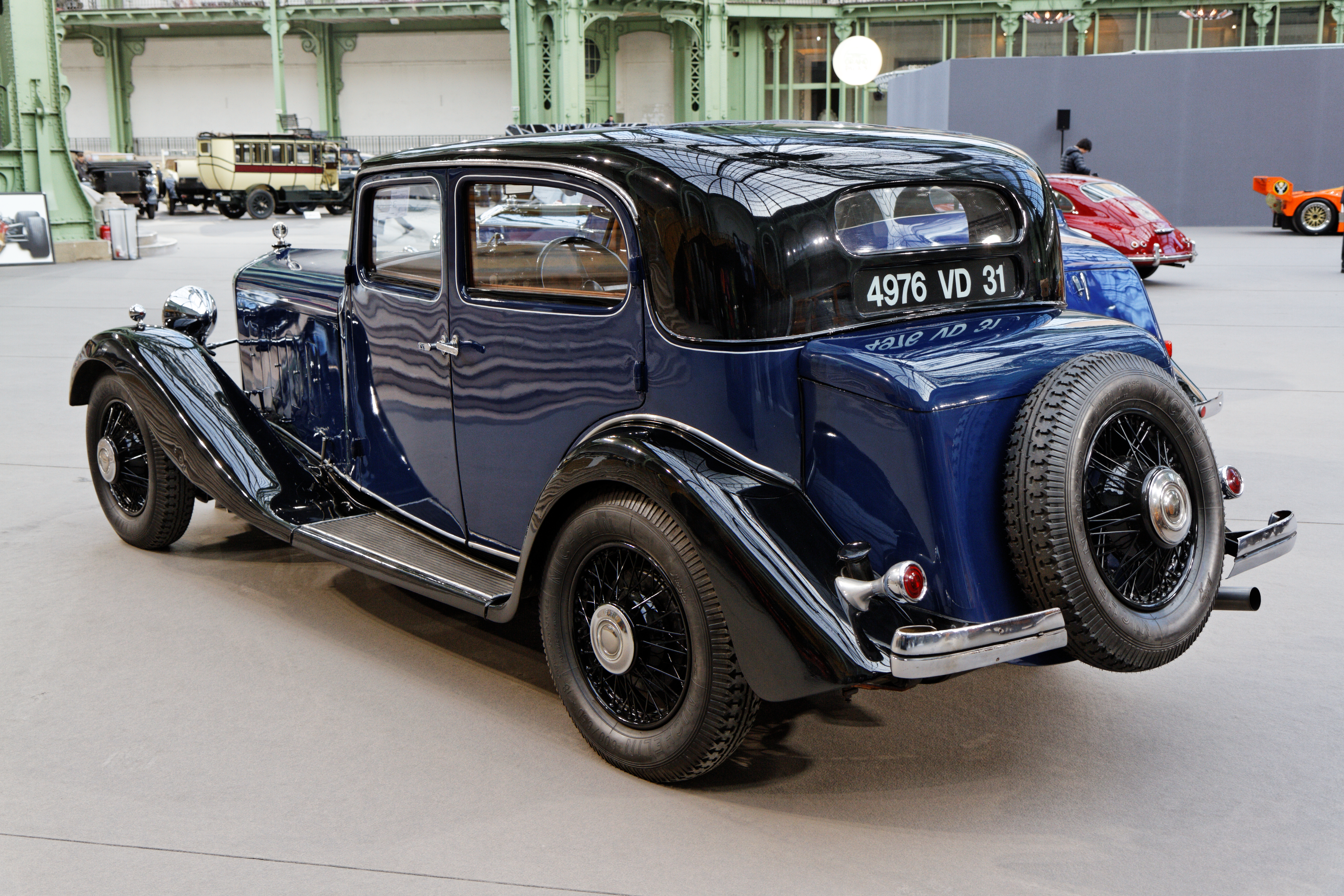
1934 Delage D8 15 Pillarless Saloon

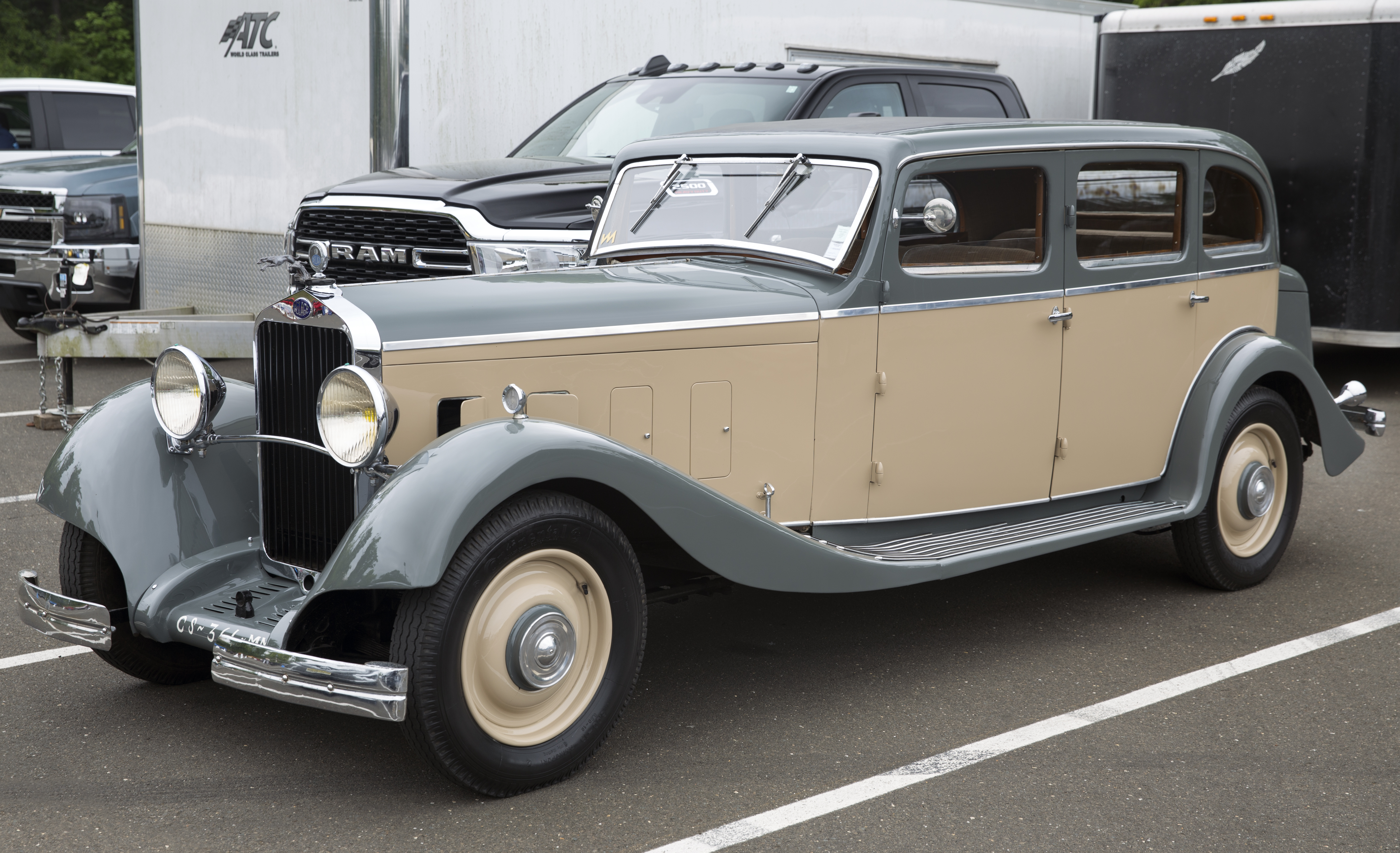
1934 Delage D8-15 Letourneur & Marchand limousine

=== Delage D8-85 and Delage D8-105 (1934 – 1935) ===
The same year saw the launch of the D8-85 and the D8-105. The D8-85 was the less extreme in terms of ultimate performance, offered with a choice between a 3,378 mm (133.0 in) and a 3,578 mm (140.9 in) chassis. The engine displacement is 3,570 cc (217.9 cu in) in this version producing, as indicated by the name, a maximum output of 85 hp (63 kW) at 4,000 rpm. On The D8-105 the engine size was the same, but the unit was modified to produce 105 hp (77 kW), while the car sat on a shortened 3,296 mm (129.8 in) chassis.

In April 1935 the manufacturer's financial difficulties culminated in the closure of Delage plant at Courbevoie, as a result of which the D8-85 and Delage D8-105 were taken out of production.

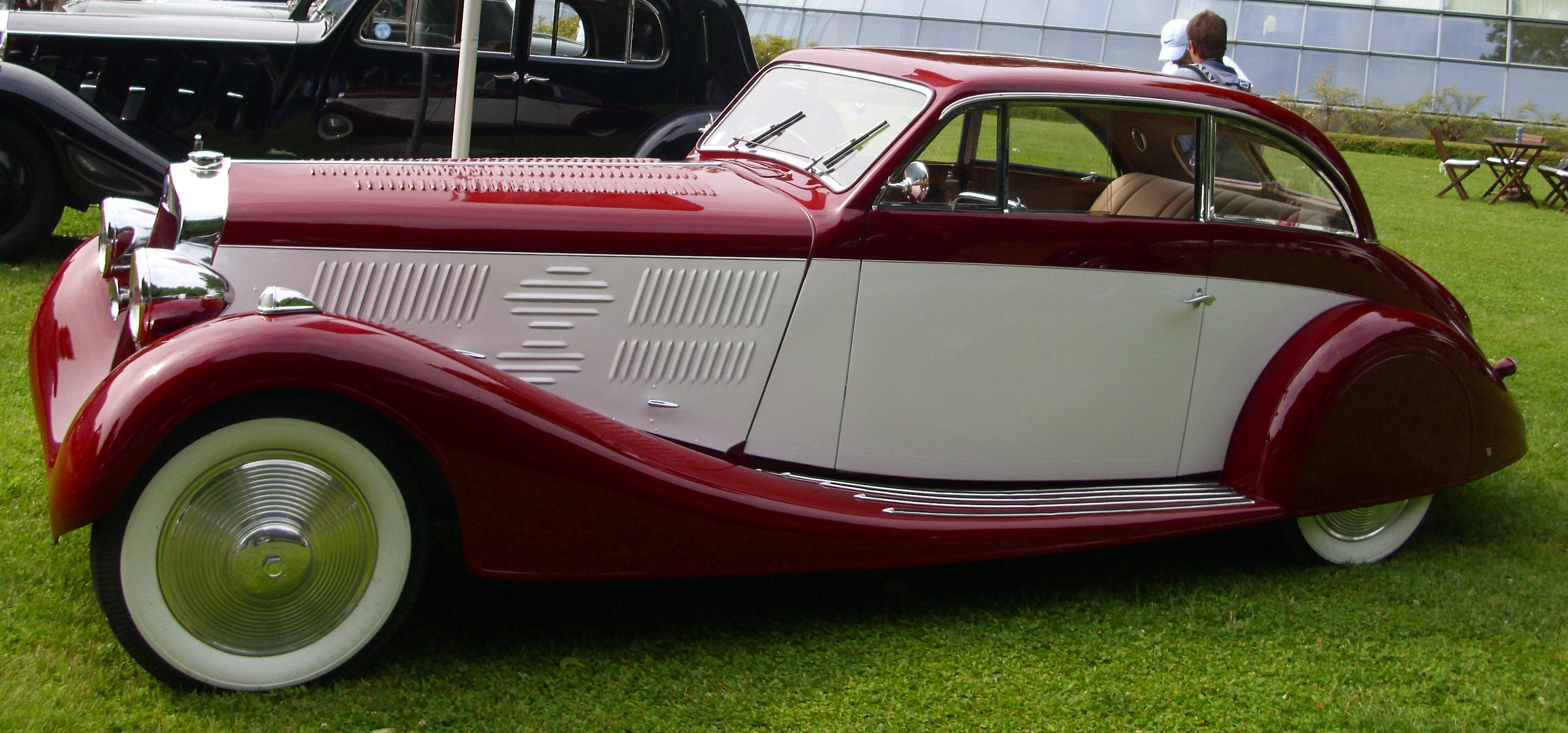
1935 Delage D8-105 Sport Coupé with coachwork by Autobineau

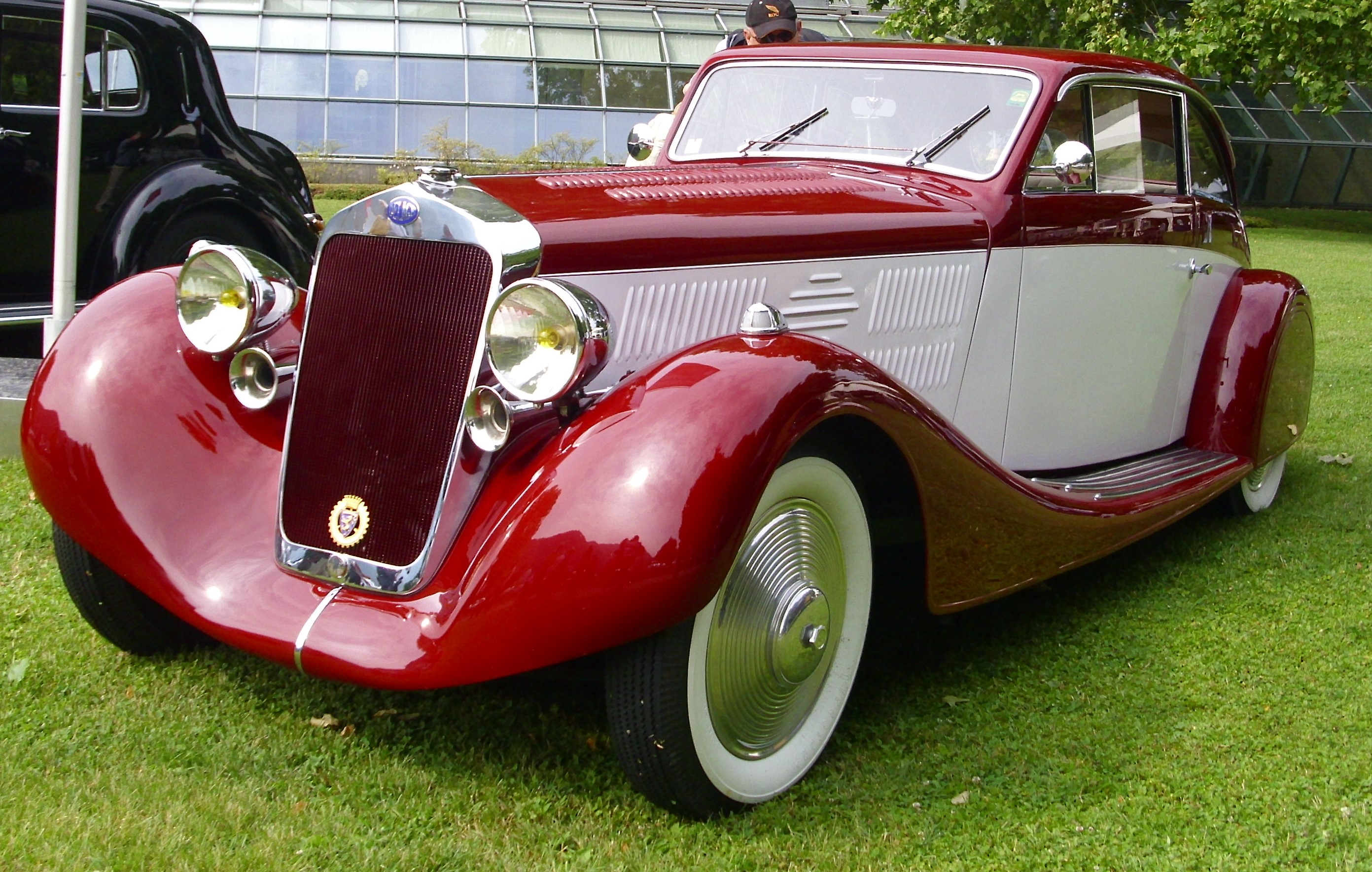

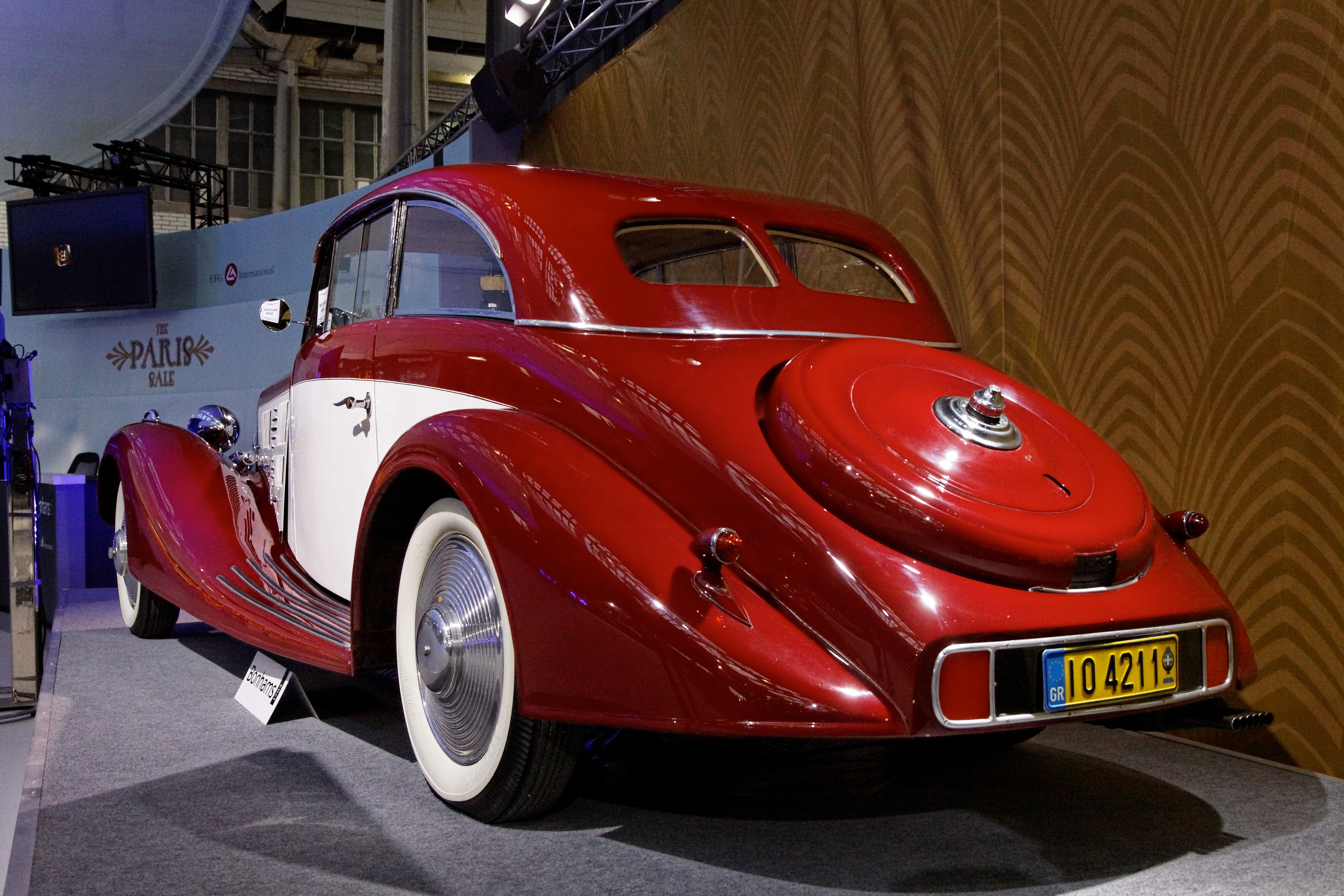
Rear ¾ view

=== Delage D8-100 (1936 – 1940) ===
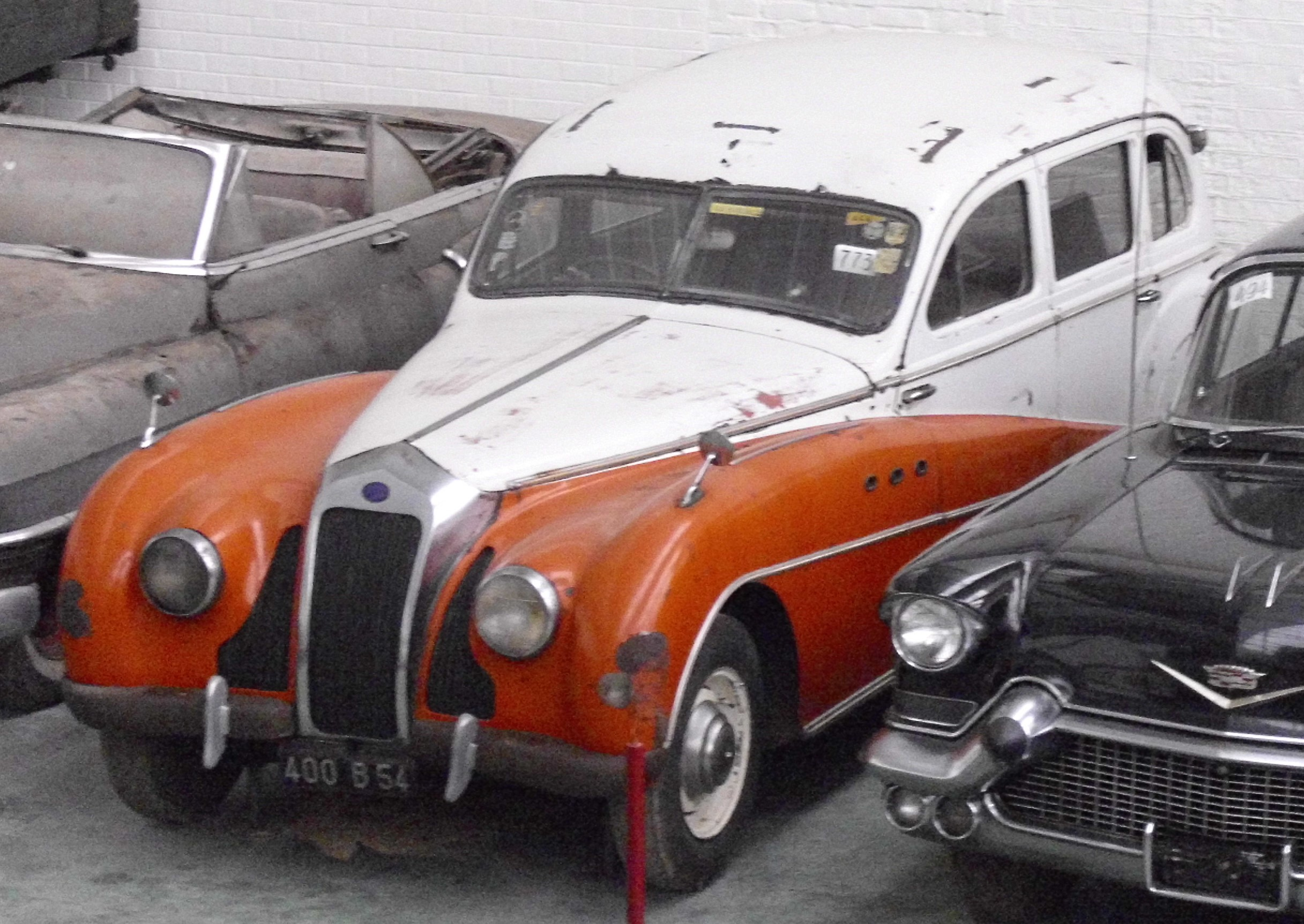
Delage Type D8.100

The arrangements with Delahaye were worked through over a period of several years, with Delage effectively a Delahaye subsidiary by 1938. Walter Watney, the British-born entrepreneurs who established in 1935 the Delage sales and marketing company "SAFAD" remained in post till 1940. Greater urgency was needed over the question of where to build the cars now that the Delage factory had closed. The solution already in place by 1936 involved continuing production of Delage engines and retaining other mechanical components, but installing them on existing Delahaye chassis.

The first D8 to be produced at the Delahaye Paris plant under the new arrangements was the D8-100. In this period Delahaye were producing cars with bodies from bespoke body builders such as Figoni et Falaschi and Saoutchik, with Delage cars following the same trends. Coachbuilders who had traditionally worked closely with Delage during the years of independence, such as Letourneur & Marchand and their subsidiary, Autobineau, were also responsible for many D8 bodied cars during this time.

The D8-100's 8-cylinder engine was now increased to 4,302 cc (262.5 cu in), the cylinder bores giving rise to a fiscal horsepower of 25 CV., Power output for the D8-100 was listed at 90 hp (66 kW), although by 1937 105 hp (78 kW) at 3500 rpm was the value given. By this time the Cotal pre-selector transmission, previously an option, came included in the price of a Delage D8. Delahayes were still powered by six-cylinder engines, and the Delage D8 was the top model produced under either brand.

The D8-100 was launched with a wheelbase choice between 3,630 mm (143 in) and 3,350 mm (132 in), although according to some sources the shorter chassis was delisted in 1937

=== Delage D8-120 (1937 – 1940) ===
By October, 1937, Delage were also listing a D8-120 model at the Paris Motor Show, which was essentially a D8-100 with the cylinder bore/diameter increased by 4 mm. Listed power was now 120 hp (88 kW) at 4,500 rpm. A long-wheelbase D8-120 was featured prominently in An American in Paris. (Image here.)

Unusual is the Aerosport Coupé, which featured a pillarless hardtop body ten years before General Motors introduced hardtops for their Buick and Cadillac lines.

In 1939, the larger engine from the D8-120 also found its way into the D8-100. However, with the declaration of war in 1939 and the invasion of northern France, in 1940, passenger car production came to an end, as the Delahaye plant was taken over by the German military occupation. Although the six-cylinder Delages would return in 1946, the eight-cylinder D8 series did not.

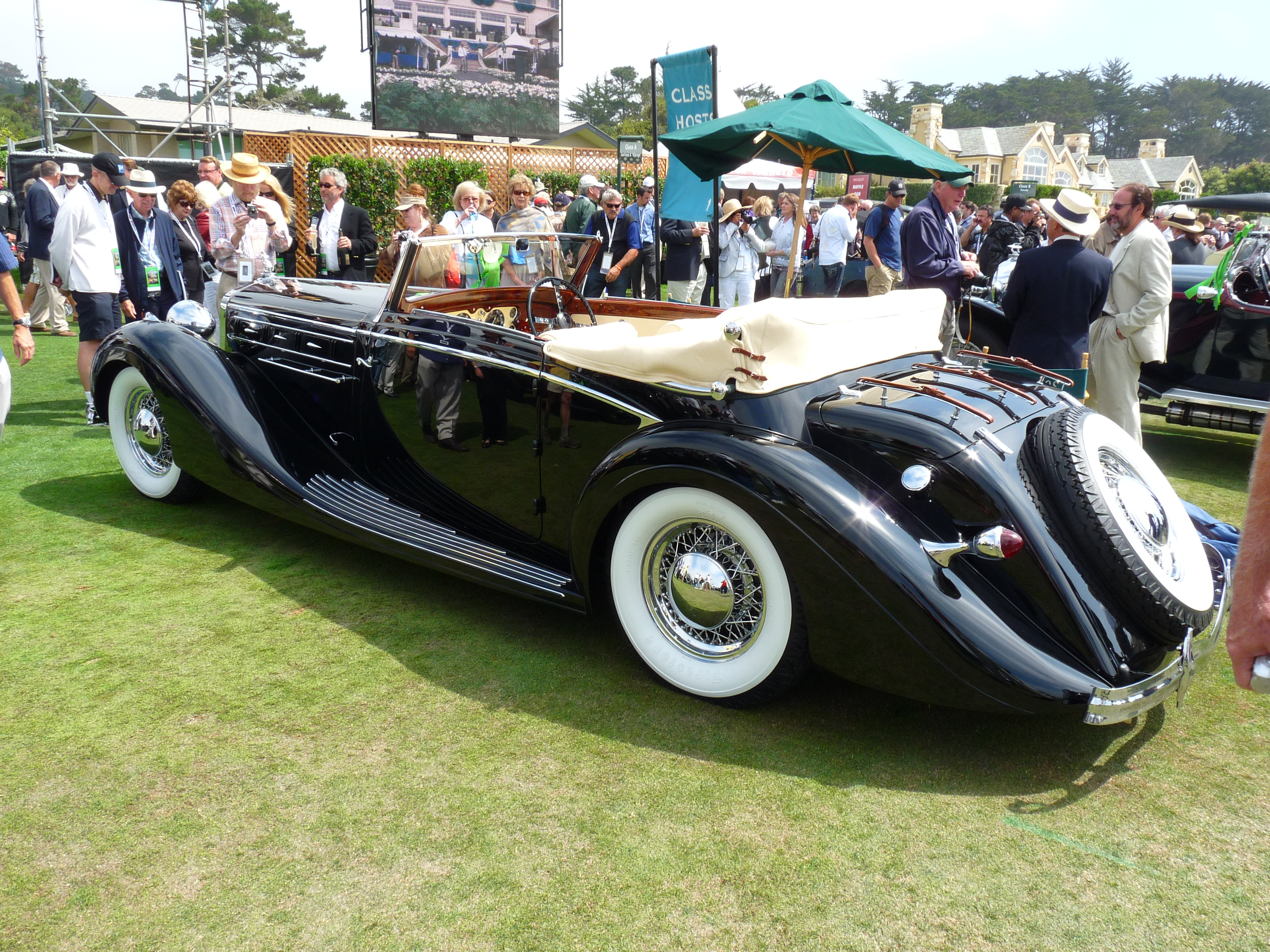
1936 Delage D8 120 Chapron Cabriolet

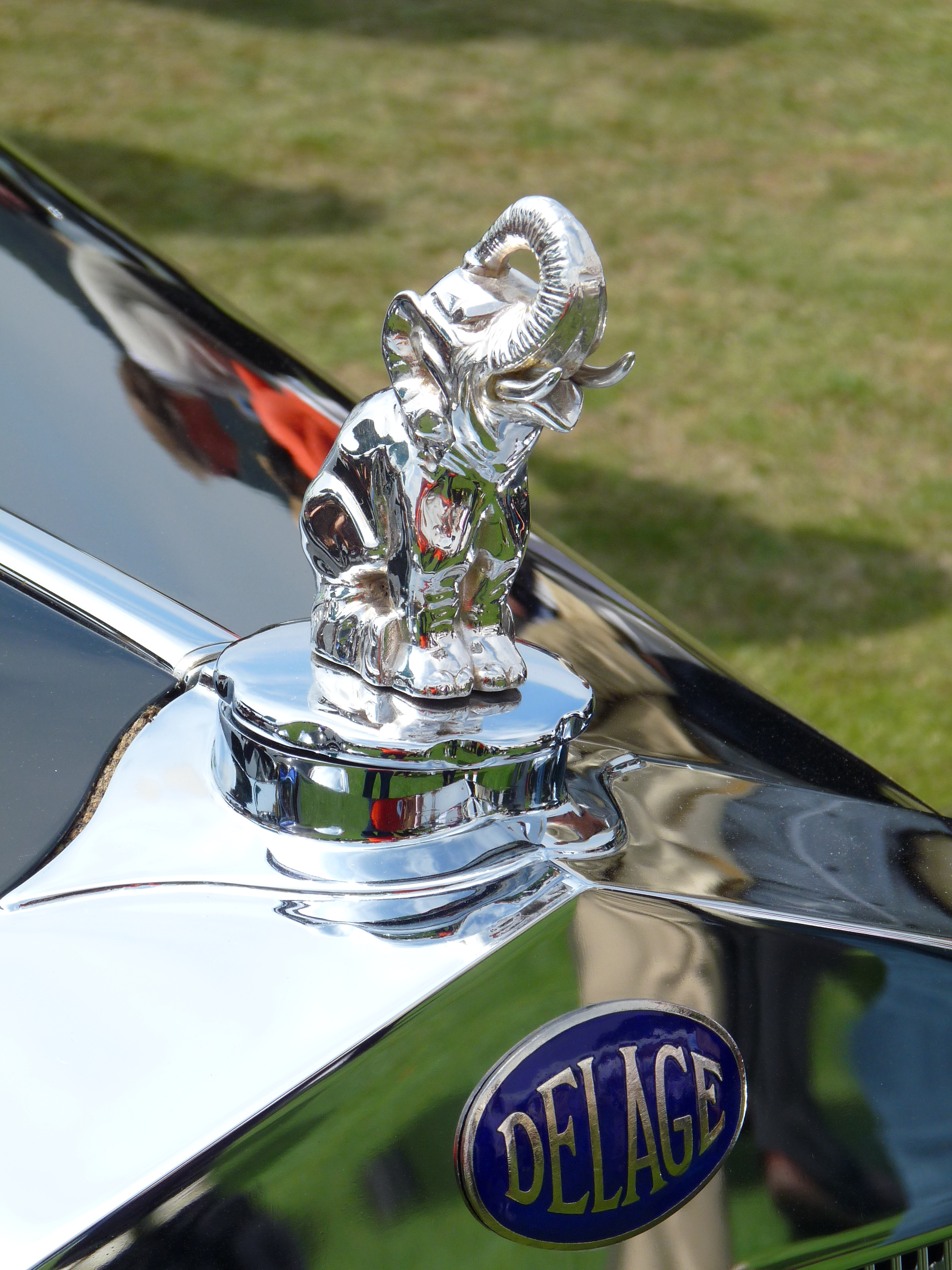
1936 Delage D8 120 Chapron Cabriolet hood ornament

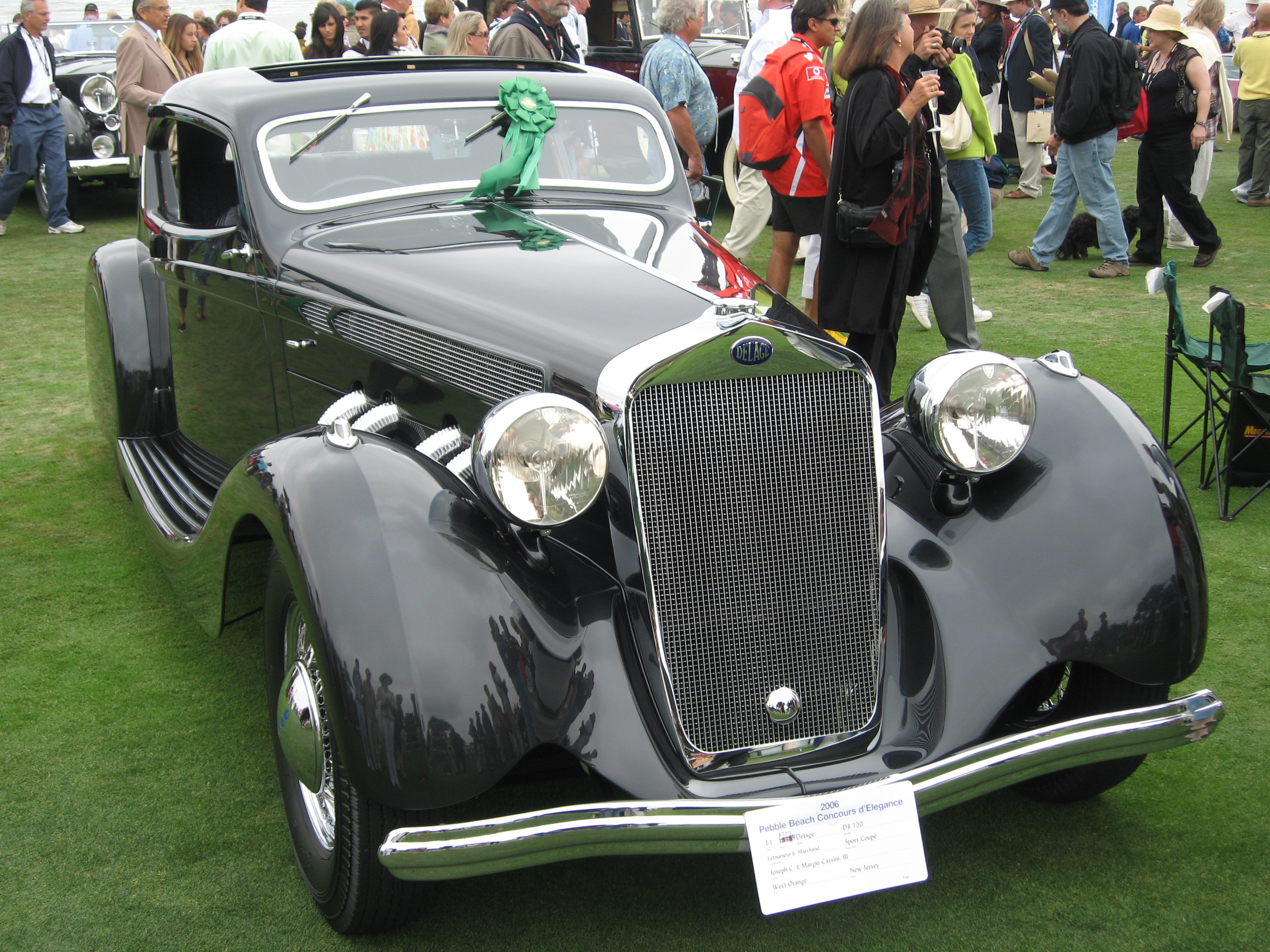
1937 Delage D8-120 Coupé Sport, coachwork by Letourneur et Marchand

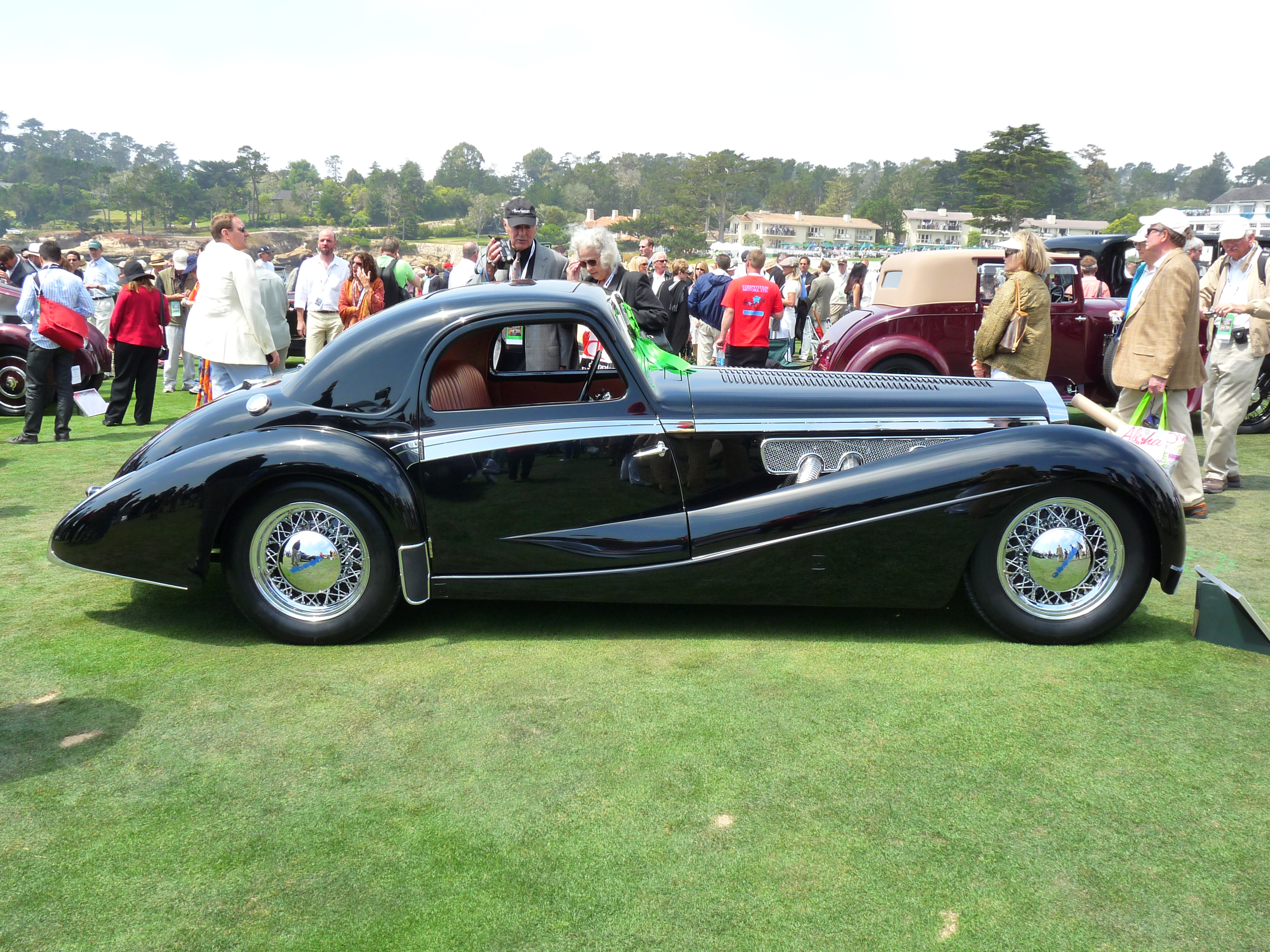
1937 Delage D8 S Letourneur et Marchand Aerodynamic Coupé

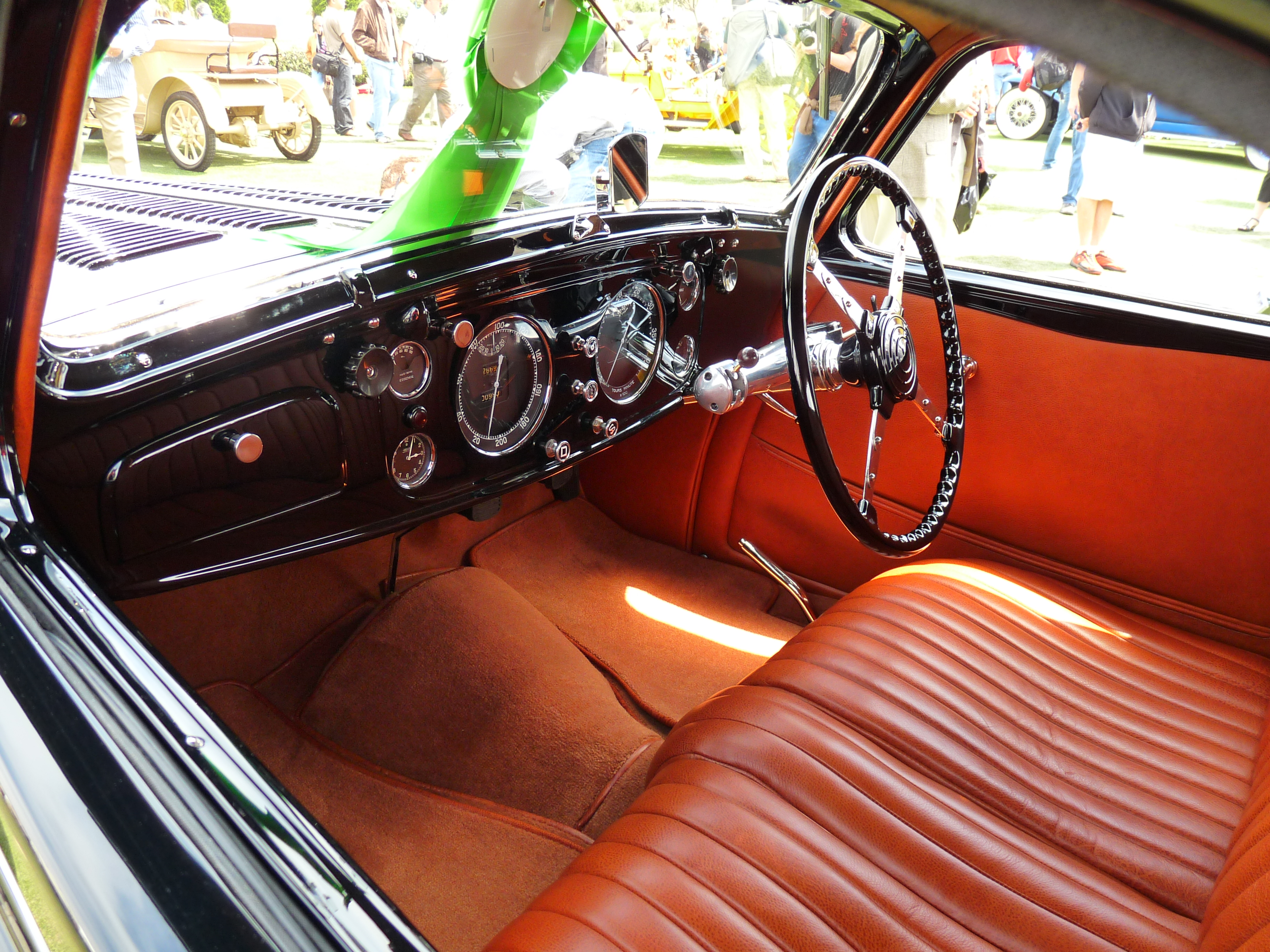
1937 Delage D8 S Letourneur et Marchand Aerodynamic Coupé

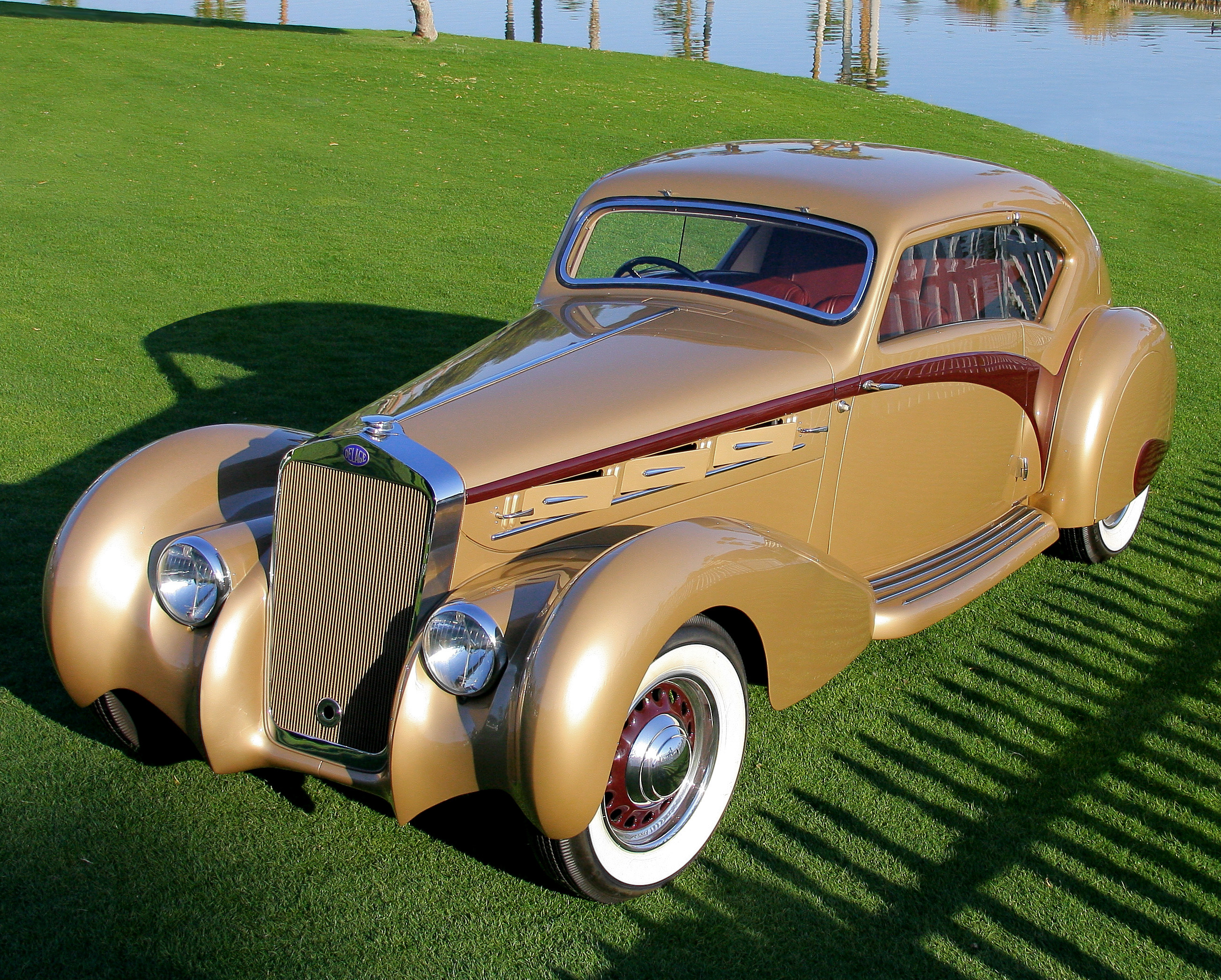
1937 Delage D8 120 Coupe Aerosport by Letourneur et Marchand

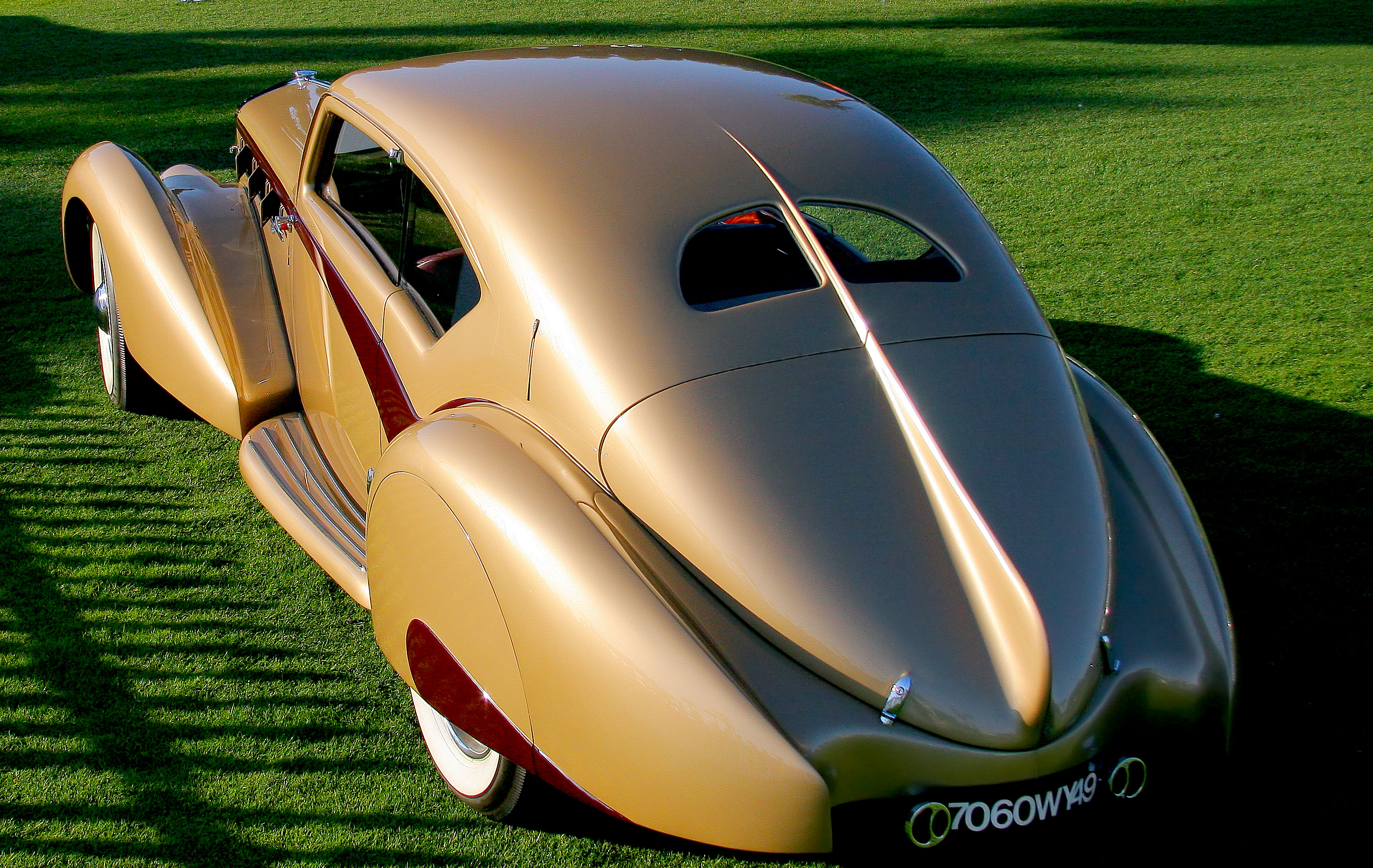
1937 Delage D8 120 Coupe Aerosport by Letourneur et Marchand

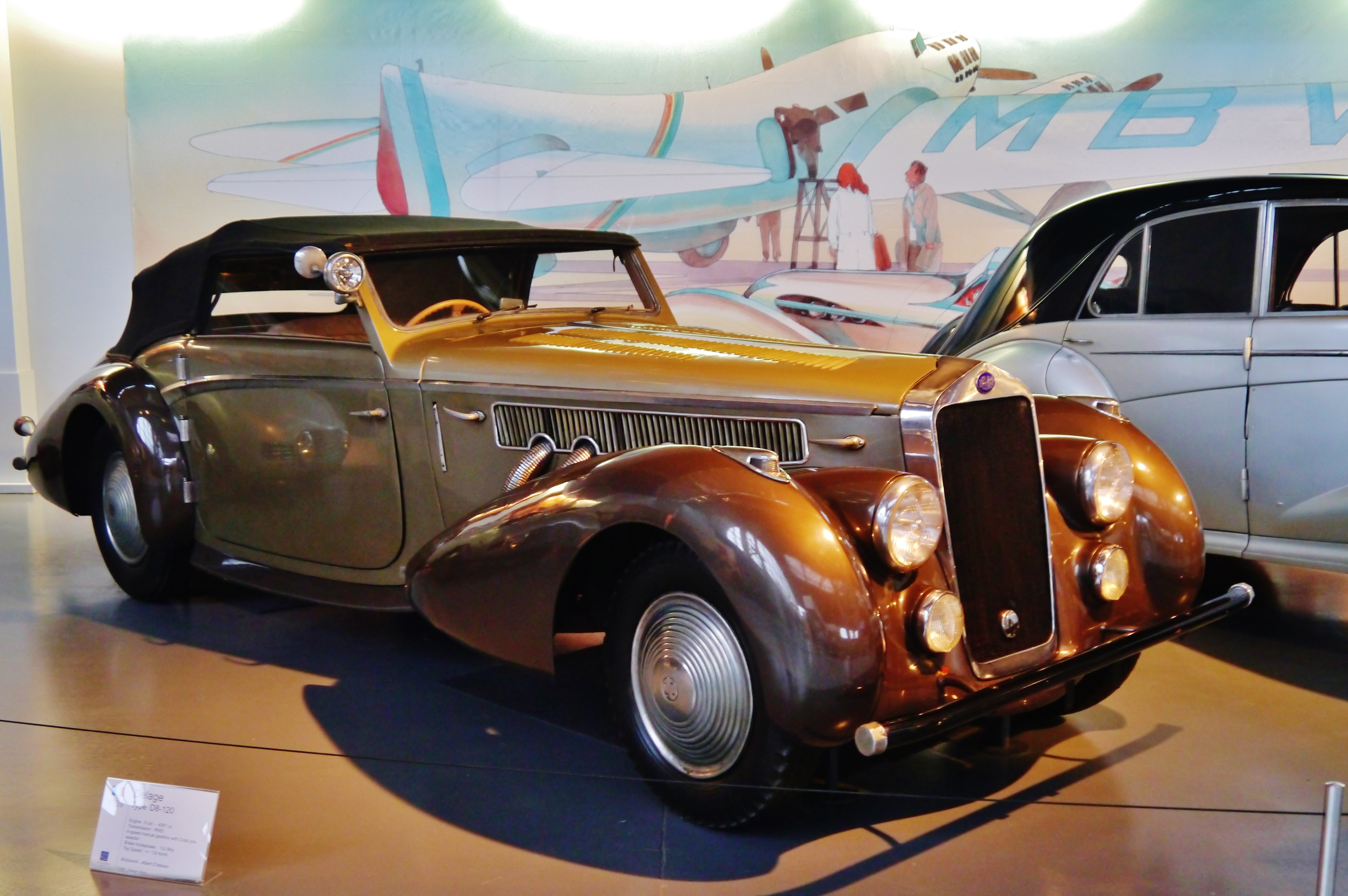
1939 Delage Type D8 120 D'Ieteren cabriolet

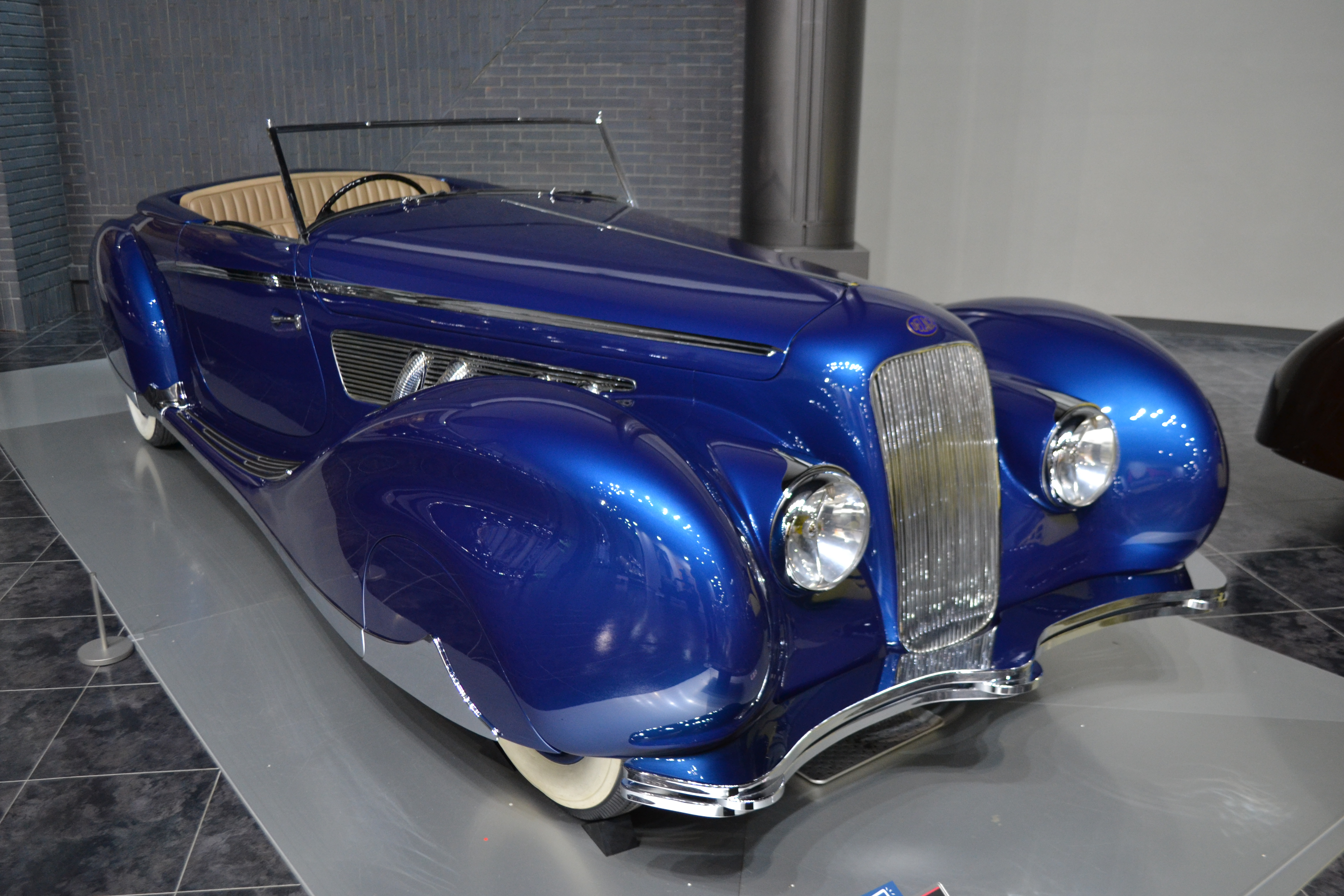
Delage D8 120

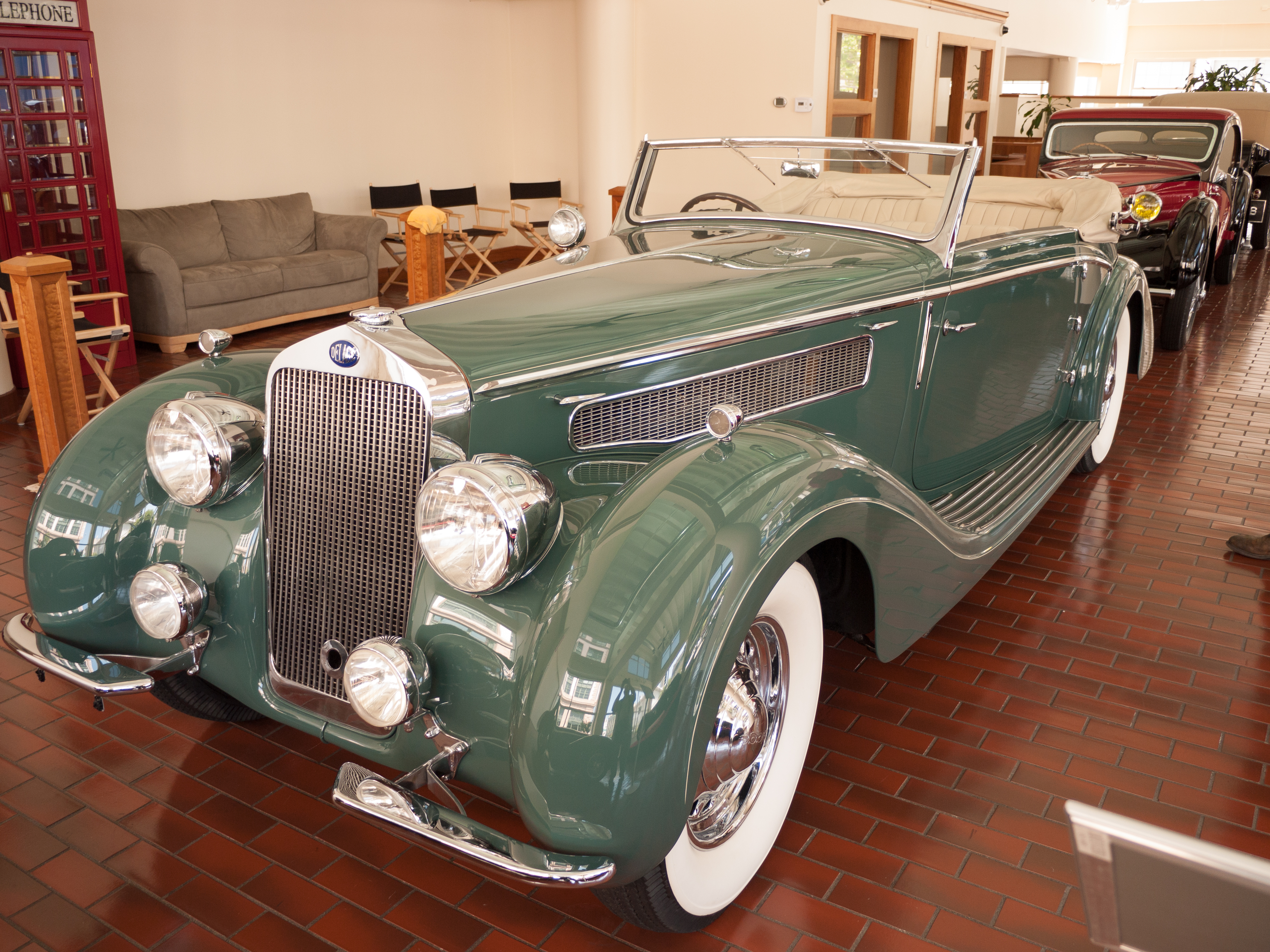
1937 Delage D8 120 Chapron cabriolet mylord (chassis 51 624)

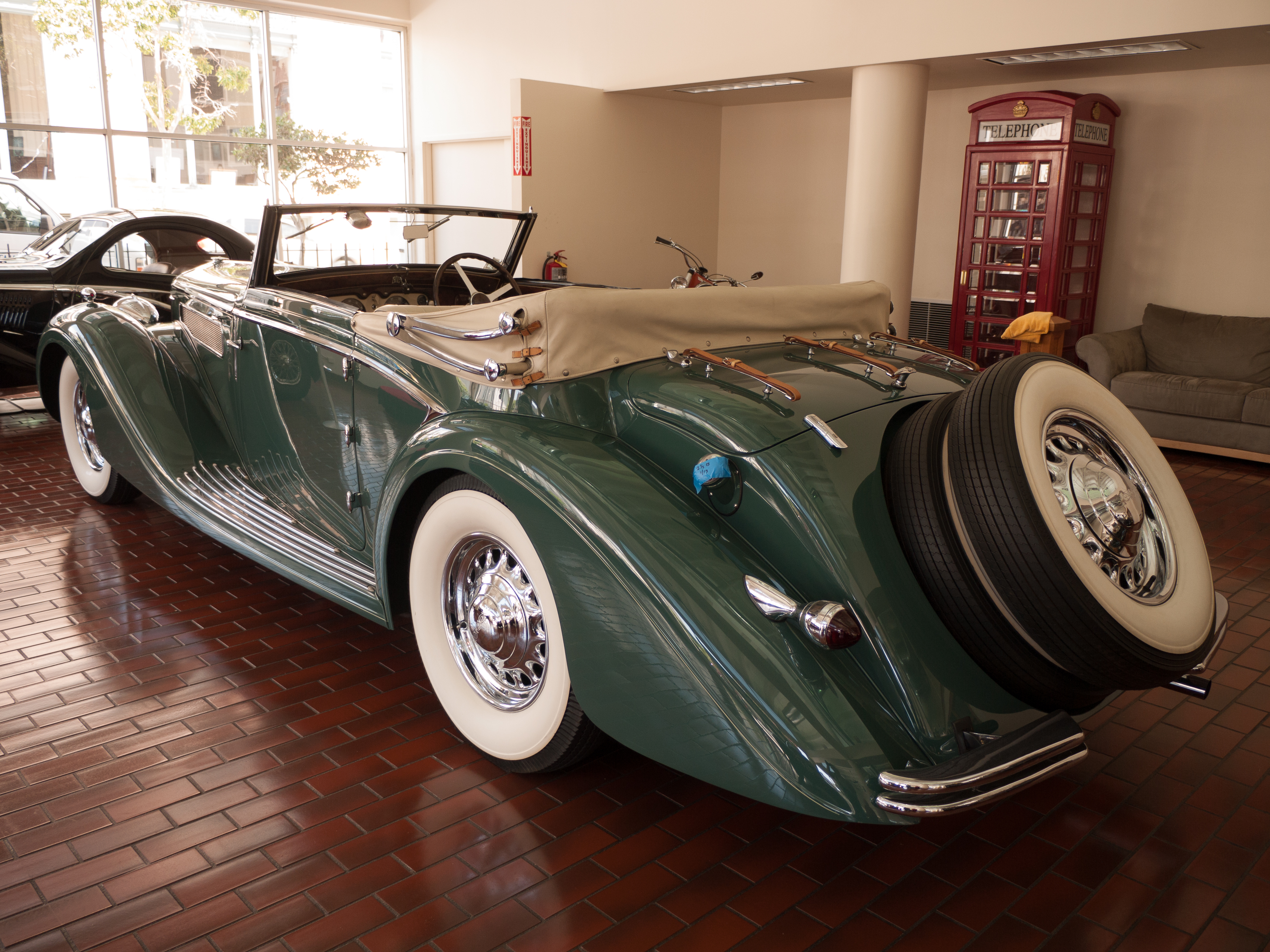
1937 Delage D8 120 Chapron cabriolet mylord (chassis 51 624)

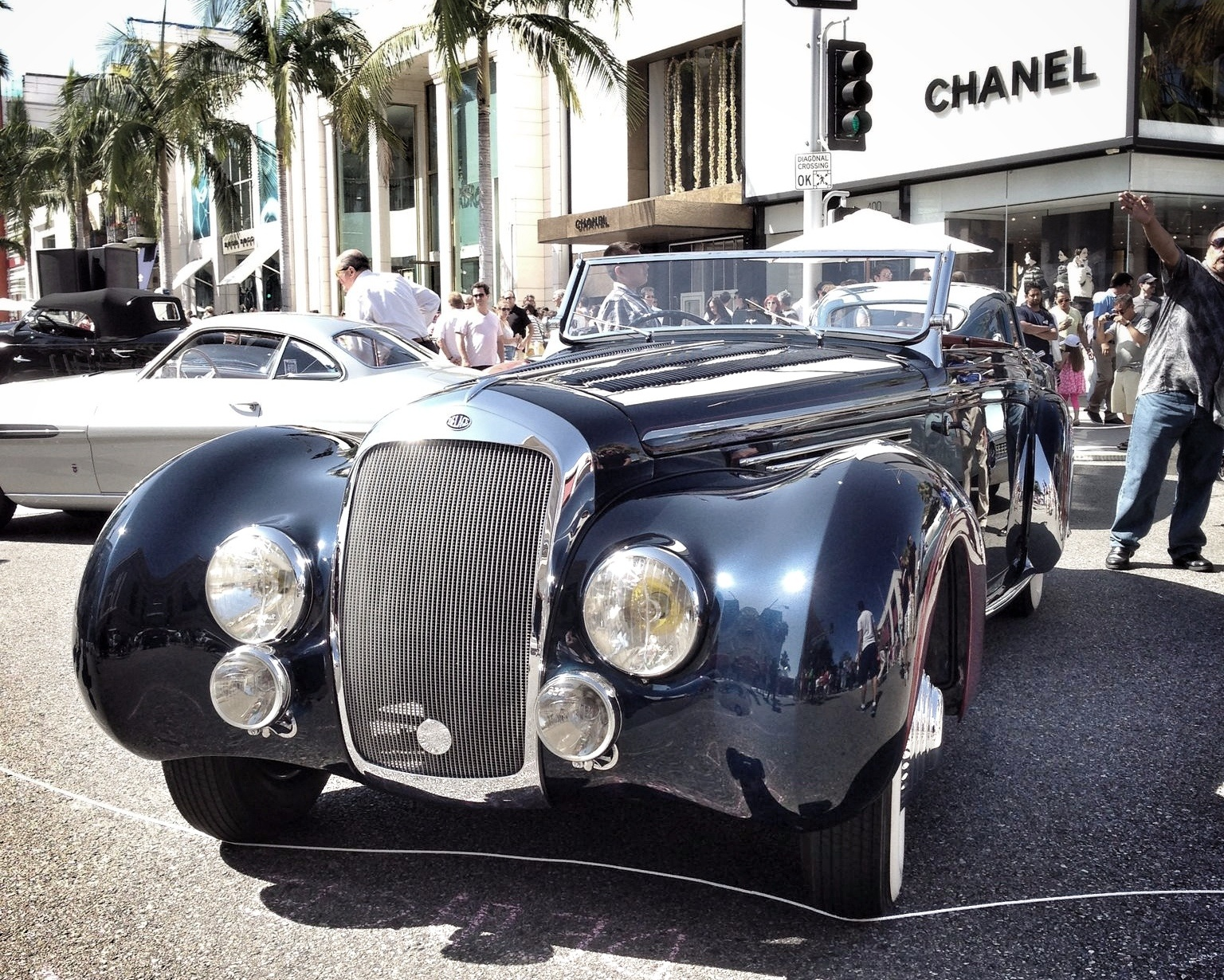
1939 Delage Type D8 120 S Chapron cabriolet Grand Luxe (chassis 51 980)
