= Letourneur et Marchand =

French coachbuilding company

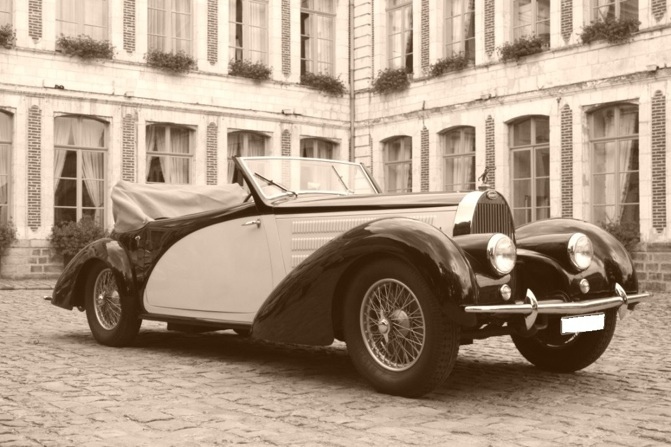
Cabriolet Bugatti Type 57 Stelvio by Letourneur & Marchand (1938)

Letourneur & Marchand, located in the prosperous Paris suburb Neuilly-sur-Seine, was a car body manufacturing business which became one of the last French coachbuilders.

== Origins and growth 1905 - 1939 ==
The company was founded by Jean-Marie Letourneur and Jean-Arthur Marchand in 1905. Both originally came from the French region of Burgundy and came to Paris independently of each other shortly before the beginning of the 20th century. Since 1900, Letourneur had worked as a designer for the established carriage manufacturer Binder Carrossier in Neuilly-sur-Seine, which Marchand also joined shortly afterwards after completing his training as a wheelwright. In April 1905, Letourneur and Marchand separated from Binder. Together they took over the premises of the previously insolvent body construction company Wehrle Godard Desmaret and set up their own business there.

Initially, Letourneur et Marchand worked primarily as a subcontractor for other coachbuilders, including Binder, Franay and Labourdette. In 1907 the company began producing individual bodies based on customer requirements; The design for the bodies came from Jean-Marie Letourneur. By the outbreak of the First World War, over 1,200 bodies had been built. During the war, the production of automobile bodies came to a standstill. Letourneur et Marchand was primarily a supplier to the armaments industry until 1918; Among other things, parts of aircraft bodies were created here.

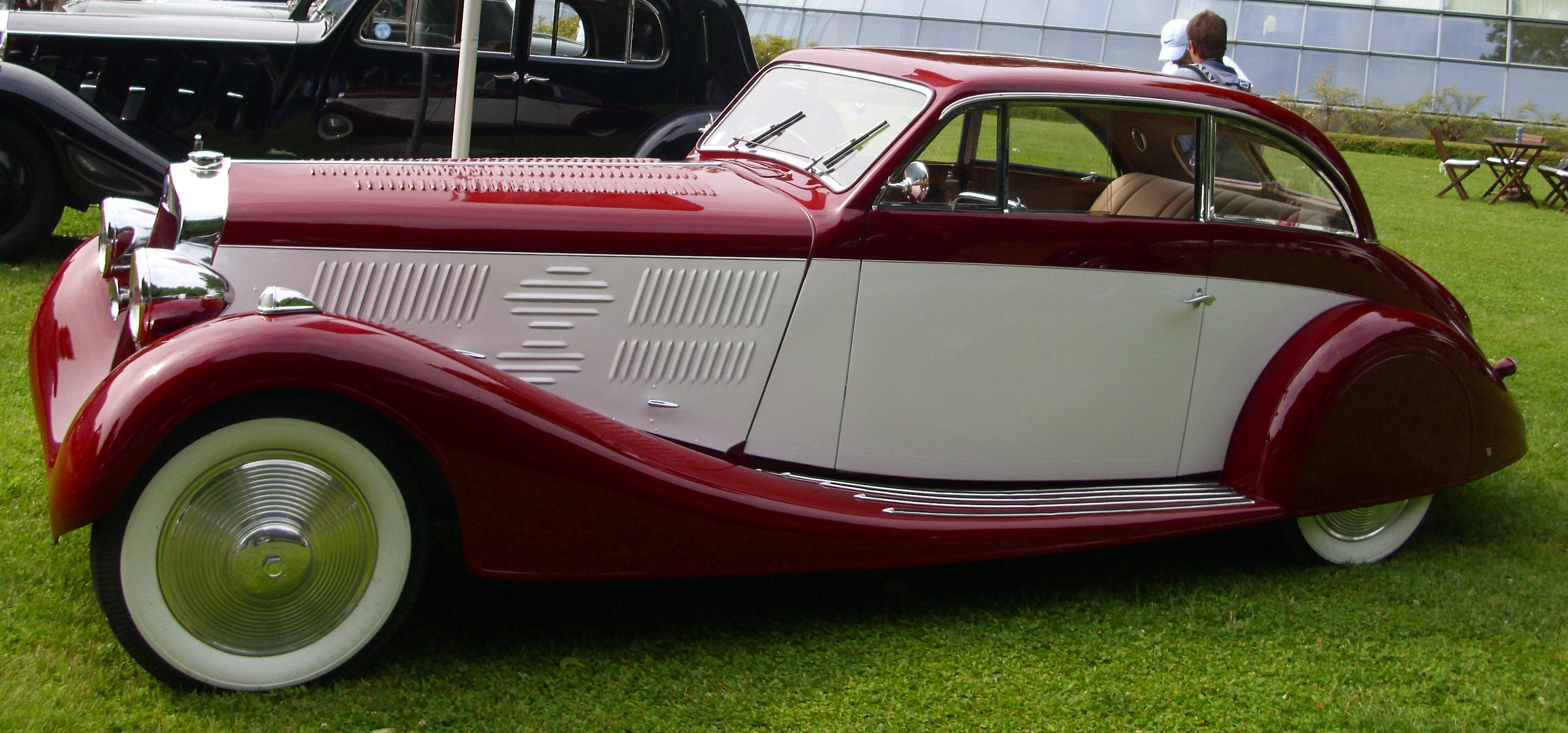
1935 Delage D8-105 Sport Coupé with coachwork by Autobineau

In 1924 the company created a subsidiary called Autobineau to specialise in sedan and limousine car bodies produced in greater volumes and in a slightly more standardised format than was associated with the upmarket coach builders. During the 1920s Letourneur et Marchand became the main supplier of car bodies for Delage. The business also built bodies for manufacturers such as Unic. In just a few years, Autobineau produced 2,000 more or less identical bodies for the Delage DI. In addition, there were still individual bodies that were created at the customer's request. Since the 1930s, Letourneur et Marchand worked primarily for Delage. In 1936, Delage introduced their D8-120 chassis, which formed the basis for the Aérosport, manufactured between 1936 and 1939, for which both Letourneur and Autobineau produced a number of bodies. The company also dressed chassis from Buick, Duesenberg, Delahaye, Packard, Panhard, Pierce-Arrow, Renault, Rolls-Royce and Bugatti. By the outbreak of the Second World War, at least 19 bodies had been built for the Bugatti Type 57. From 1930 onwards, the design of the bodywork was predominantly in the hands of Marcel Letourneur, a son of the company's founder, who had received artistic training and worked for several British coachbuilding companies in the 1920s. Marcel Letourneur often created aerodynamically designed bodies that had a low beltline and did without a central vehicle pillar in order to make the roof structure appear lighter. An outstanding example of this design style was Marcel Letourneur's Coupé Panoramique from 1937, which was built on a Delage D6 chassis. The company also manufactured similar bodies for chassis from other manufacturers, including Lincoln.

== Decline and demise 1945 - 1960 ==
During the Second World War, automobile production again came to a standstill. The founders of the company died shortly before (Jean-Marie Letourneur, 1944) or after the end of the war (Jean-Arthur Marchand, 1946). After the war, their successors tried to restart operations but, like their competitors Saoutchik and Figoni et Falaschi, failed due to changing circumstances. This included, among other things, France's economic weakness in the early post-war years, which meant that demand for exclusive luxury vehicles was very limited. The former business partner Delage, who had already been absorbed into the Delahaye company before the war, finally stopped production in 1953. In addition, automobile manufacturers switched to self-supporting bodies, which made it harder to manufacture custom bodies for cars. Letourneur et Marchand also found themselves one of numerous auto-businesses far too small to feature significantly in the government's vision for an export led French auto-industry dominated by a handful of large manufacturers. Between 1947 and 1952 the company produced only 67 car bodies, equivalent to about one car per month. Immediate financial collapse was averted in 1953 thanks to a contract signed with Renault for the production of a cabriolet version of the Renault Frégate which had been homologated with the authorities and could be sold and serviced through one of France's largest dealership networks. Unfortunately the Frégate itself had got off to a slow start in the market place, being beset by teething problems and reliability issues, and although sources indicate that during the second half of the decade it became a much more dependable vehicle, in terms of sales volumes it was hopelessly out competed by the Simca Vedette and the Citroën DS. The Frégate struggled on till 1960 when it was withdrawn without direct replacement, and during this time 70 Letourneur et Marchand cabriolet variants were produced. The final batch of Frégate cabriolets featured an eye catching two tone paint scheme, coloured either "black and ivory" or "black and turquoise".

Letourneur & Marchand collapsed in 1960 following the discontinuation of their cabriolet version of the Renault Frégate.

== Gallery ==
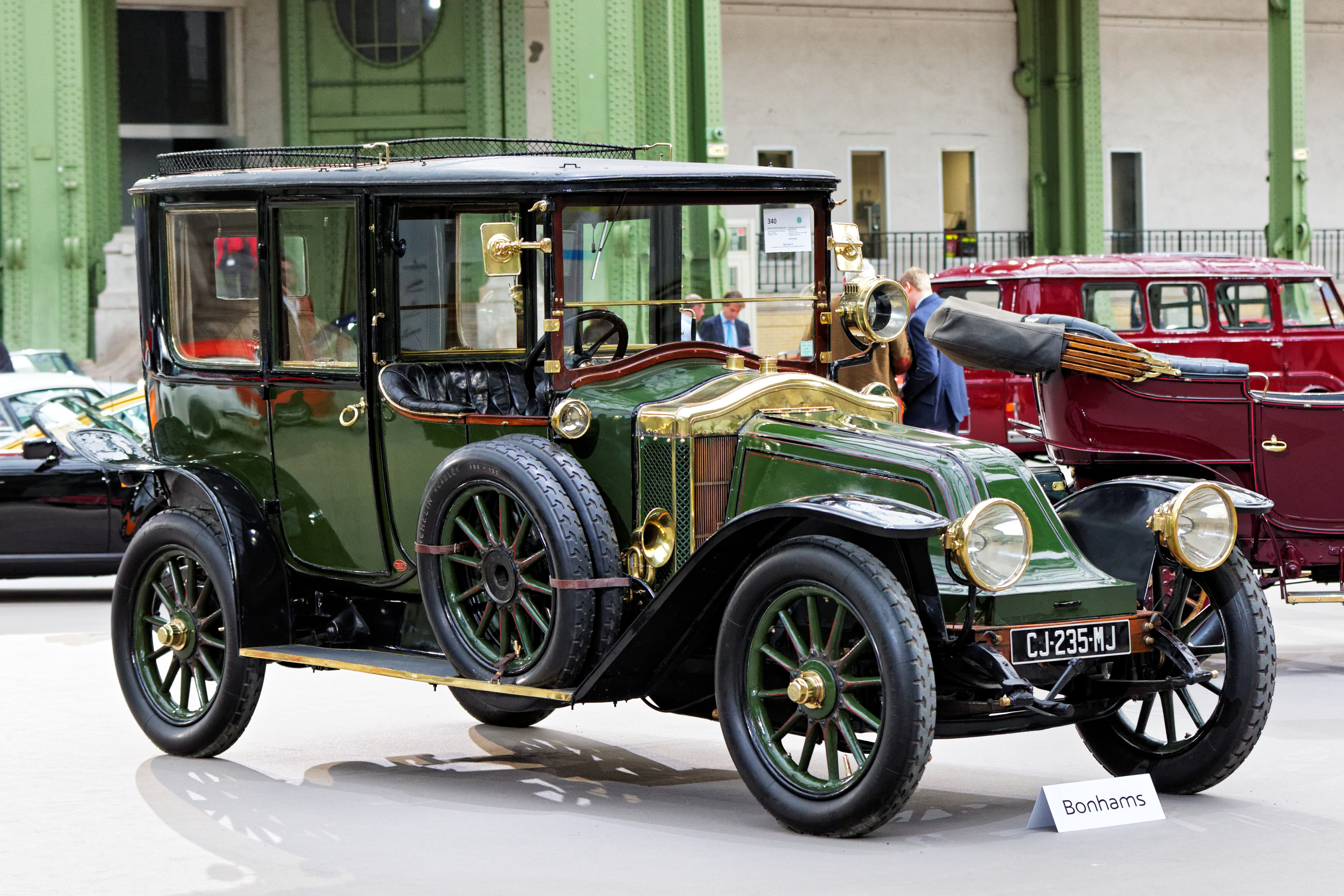
1914 Renault 22cv type EE limousine by Letourneur et Marchand

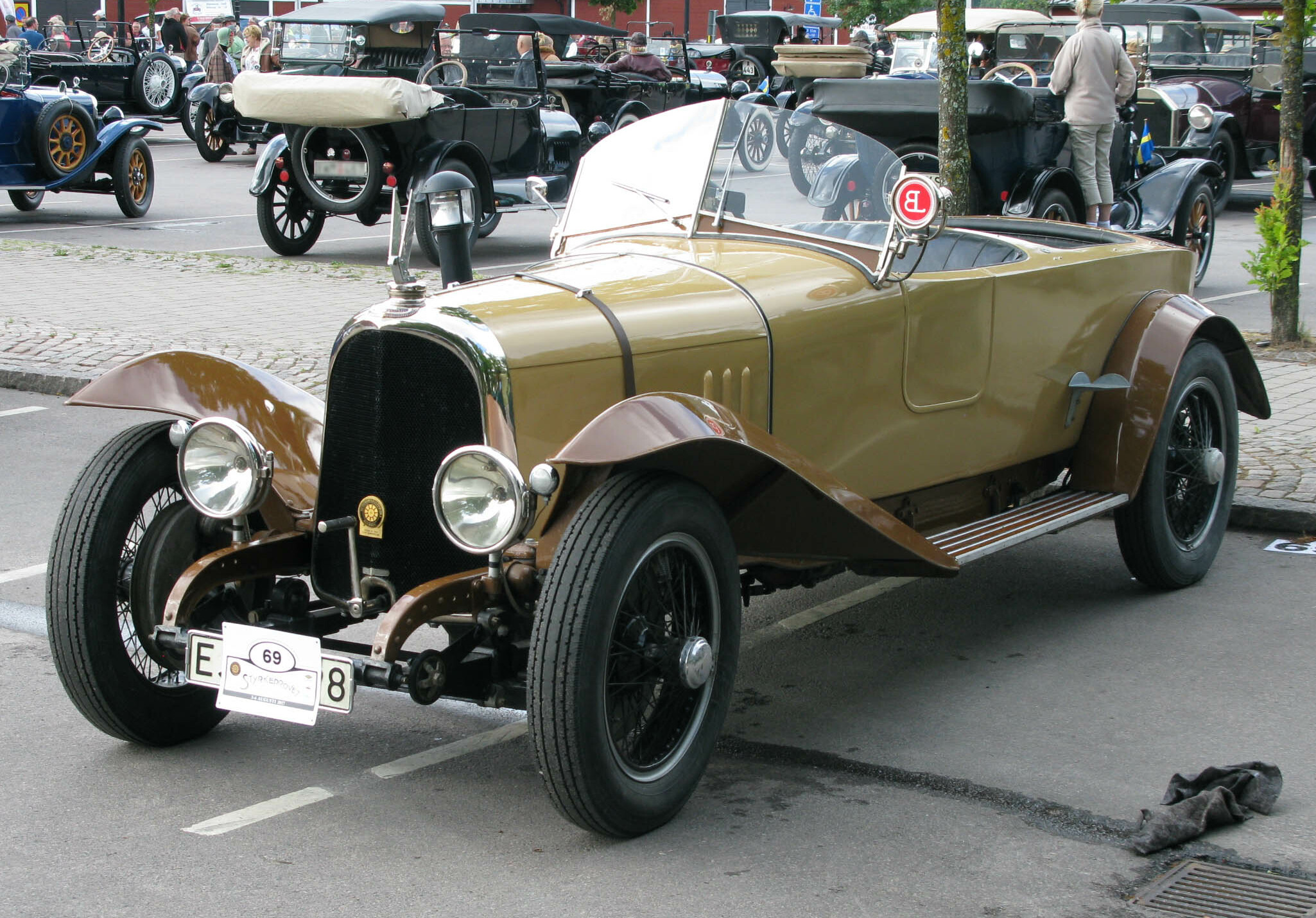
1924 Voisin by Letourneur et Marchand

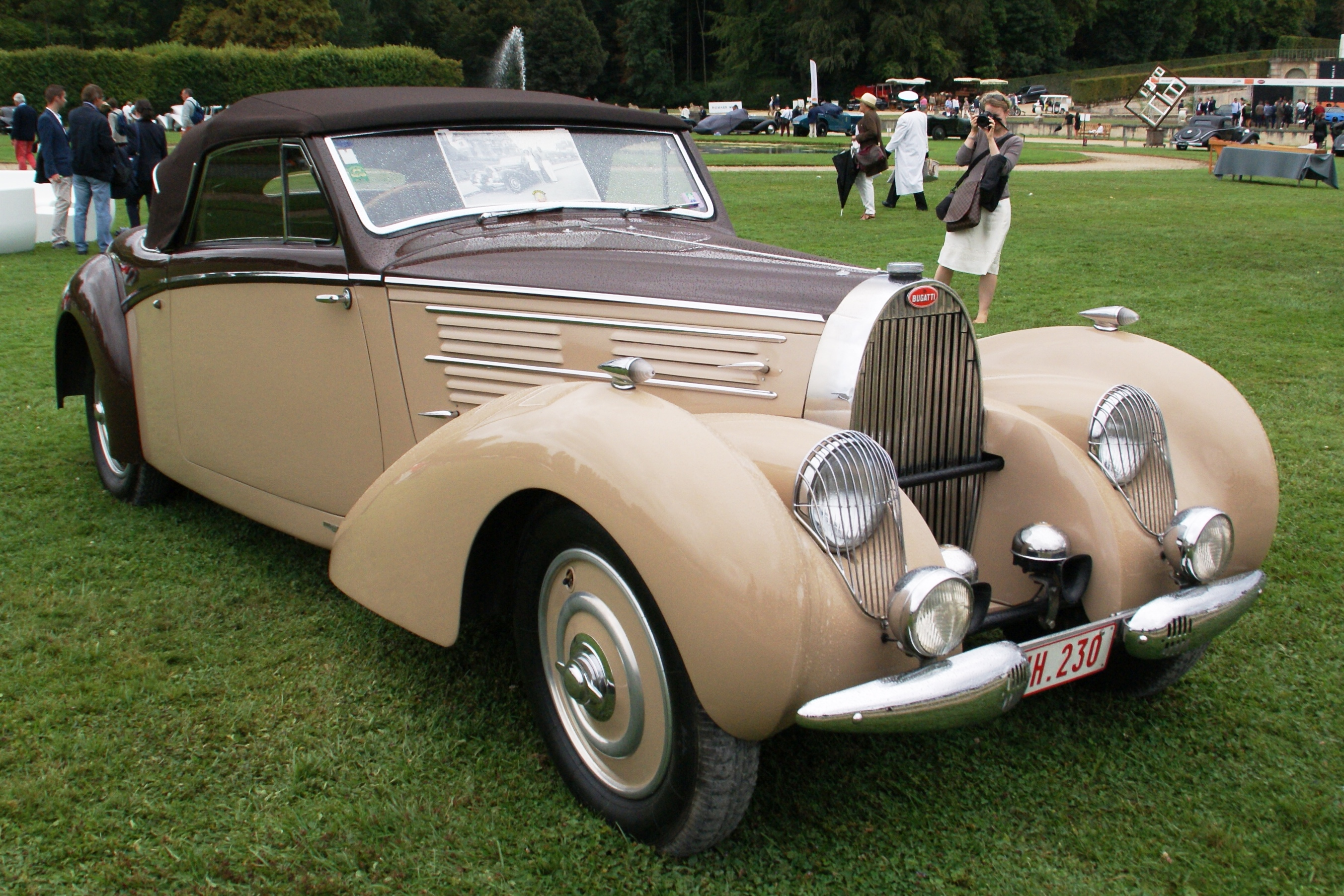
1937 Bugatti Type 57C Aravis Cabriolet by Letourneur et Marchand

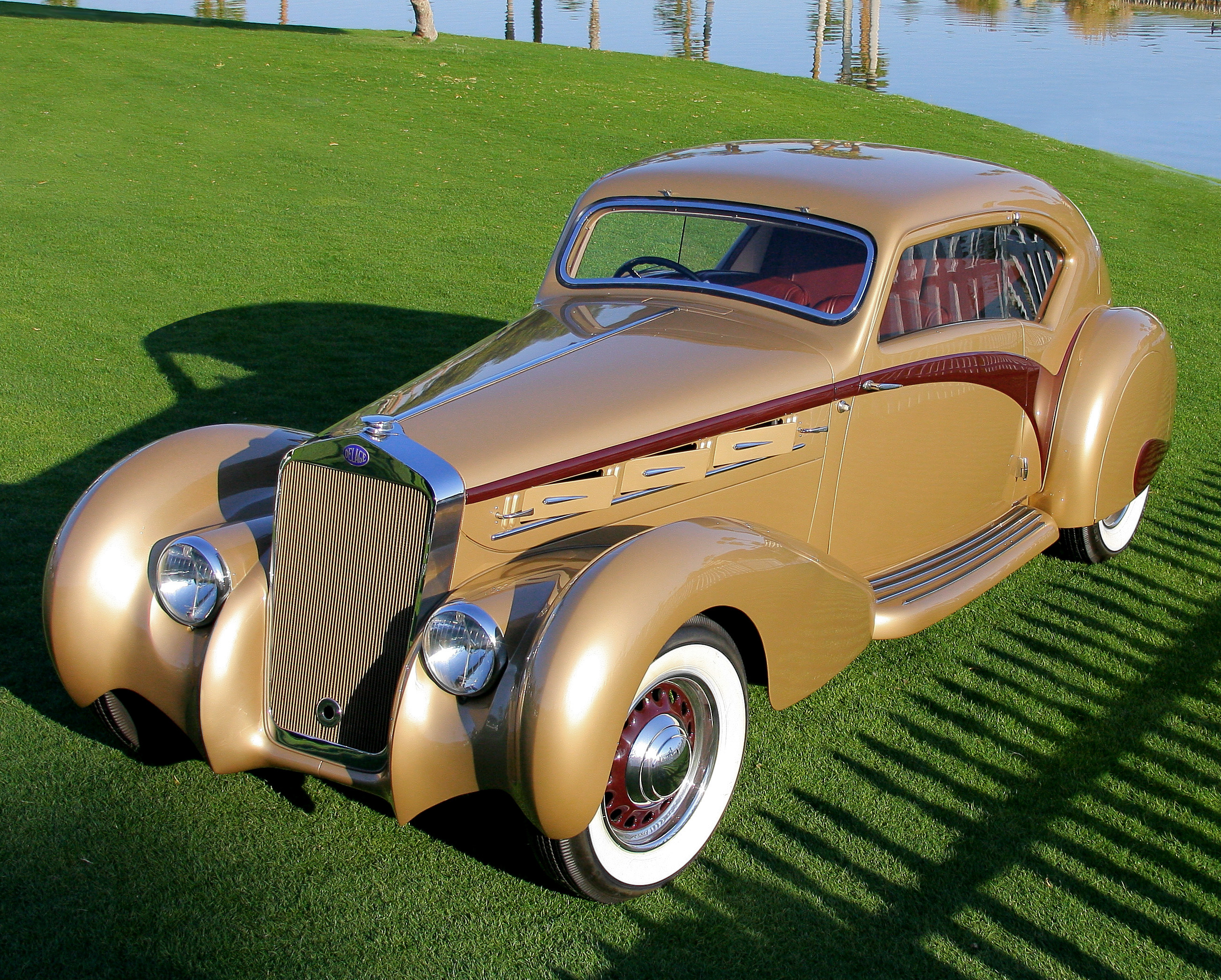
1937 Delage D8 Coupe Aerosport by Letourneur et Marchand

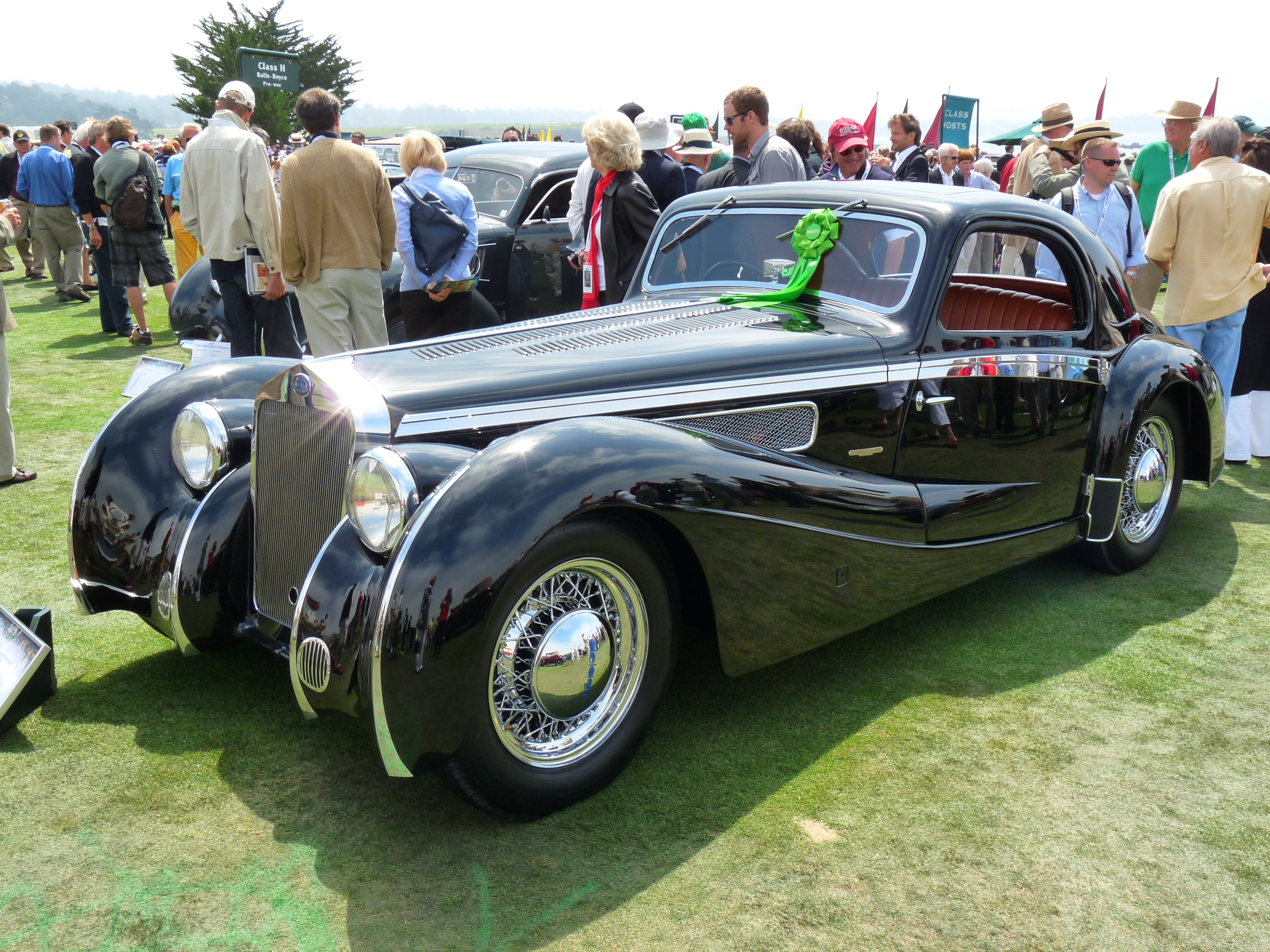
1937 Delage D8-120 S Aérosport by Letourneur et Marchand

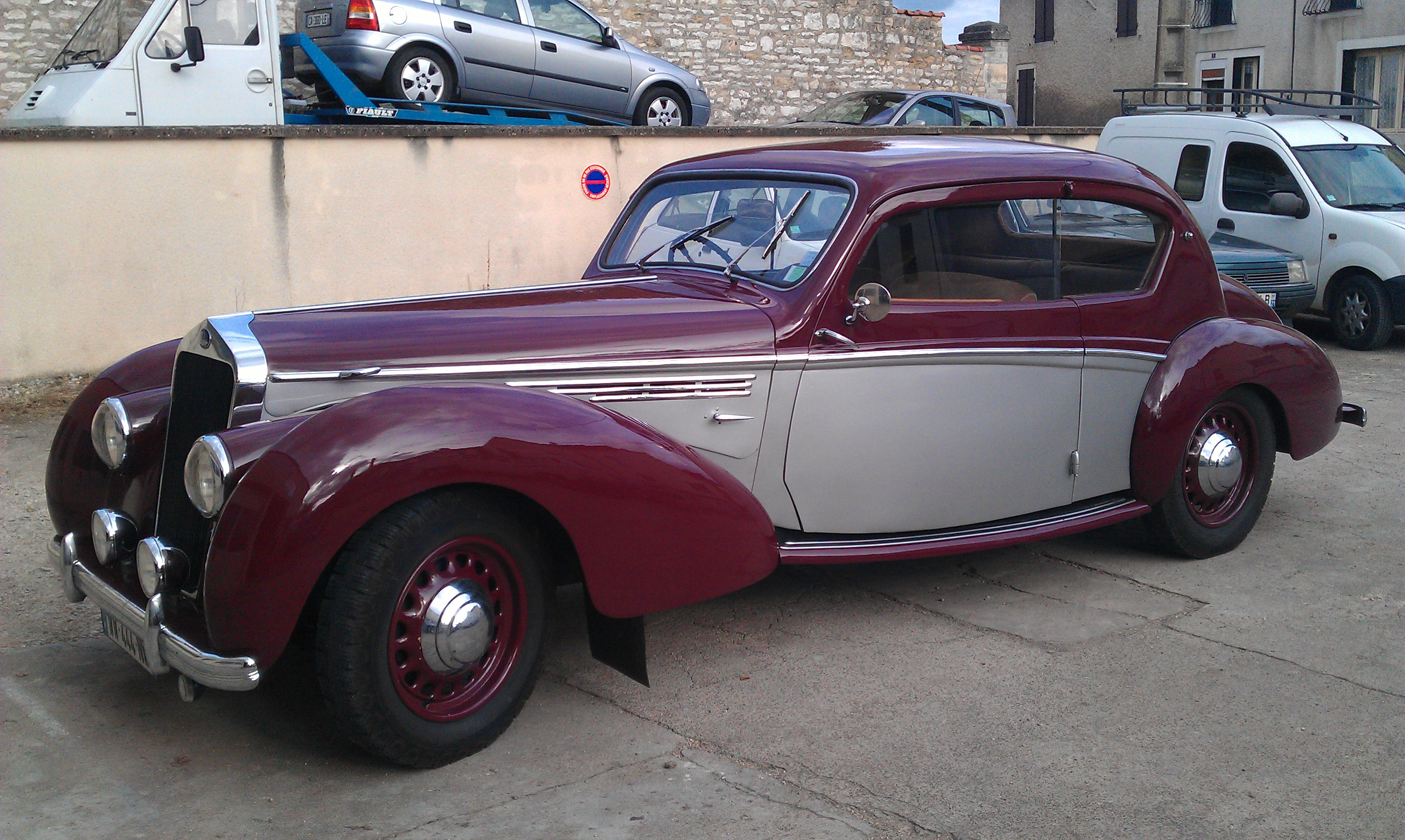
1947 Delage D6-70 by Letourneur et Marchand

== References and sources ==
- La carrosserie française, du style au design, par Serge Bellu, éditions E.T.A.I., 2007. ISBN 978-2-7268-8716-5
