= Delage D6 =

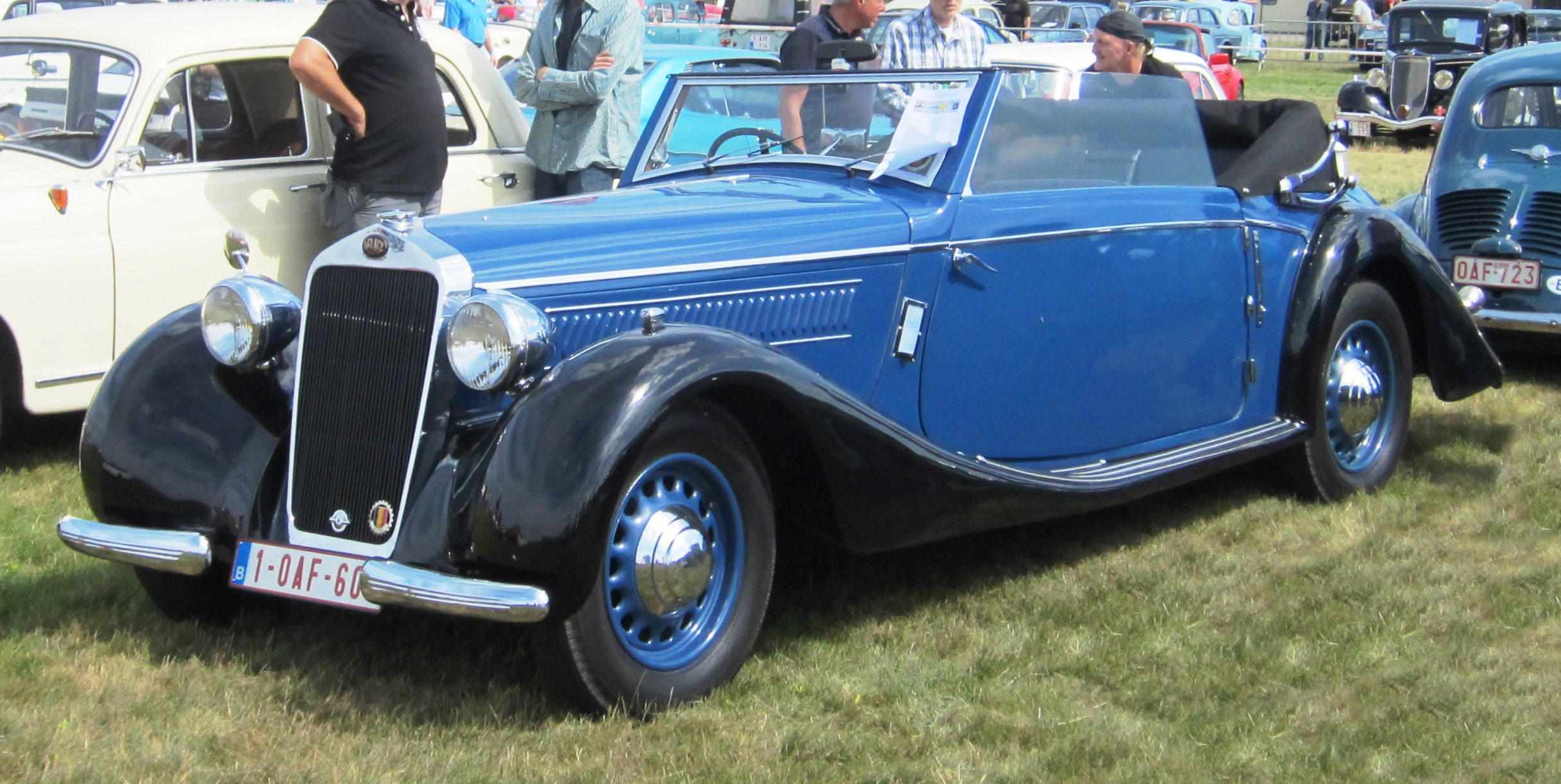
- Delage D6-70 (1937)

Overview
- Manufacturer: Delage
- Also called: Delage D6-11 (1932-34); Delage D6-12 (1936-); Delage D6-65 (1934-35); Delage D6-60 (1935-37); Delage D6-80 (1935-37); Delage D6-70 (1937-38); Delage D6-75 (1939-40); Delage D6 3-litre (1946-54); Delage D6-Olympic (1948-49)
- Production: 1930–1940; 1946–1953

Body and chassis
- Body style: Normally delivered by Delage in bare chassis form, to be fitted with a bespoke coach built body from one of several leading coachbuilders. Most cars were given coupé, cabriolet, sedan/saloon or roadster bodies

Powertrain
- Engine: Six-cylinder (1930-54)
- Transmission: 4-speed manual 4-speed Cotal pre-selector (optional)

Dimensions
- Wheelbase: various, all above 3,000 mm (120 in)

The Delage D6 is a six-cylinder luxury car produced by the manufacturer between 1930 and 1940 and again, after the war, between 1946 and 1953. (The final cars were still receiving their bodies from specialist coach builders and being listed for sale during 1954.) For much of this time it was the company's principal or, from 1946, only model.

The Delage D6 was a popular model, and its longer wheelbase sister, the inline eight-cylinder D8 model, was more so. But both were expensive, and demand was too low to sustain the company.

Rather than declaring bankruptcy, Louis Delage put his company into voluntary receivership, administrated by prominent Delage distributor Walter Watney. Delahaye's managing director Charles Weiffenbach orchestrated an agreement with Watney and Delage, to acquire the assets of the Delage company, and from 1935 onward, Delage D6 and D8 cars were built by Delahaye, alongside its own. The new D8-120 engine was an eight-cylinder version of Delahaye's Type 135, with two added cylinders. Weiffenbach agreed with Watney and Delage, to not build a model to compete with the Delage D8-120. The large displacement Delage was not re-introduced after the war, but the D6-70 continued, in low numbers, until Delahaye ceased to exist at the end of 1954.

The 3045 cc engine of the original D6 placed it in the 17CV car tax band which, for many contemporaries, would also have defined its position in the market hierarchy. During its long production run the car underwent a succession of changes, many of which involved enlargement or modification of the six-cylinder engine. During the 1930s there were, for some of the time, two or three different engines sizes offered. Principal changes and differences in engine sizes were marked by changes and differences as to the suffix at the end of the car's name, generally reflecting differences in fiscal or actual horsepower. For some purposes it can be helpful to think of the D6 as a succession of closely related individual models, but the basic architecture of the chassis and engine did not differ radically between the different versions.

== Bodies ==
Delage took a traditional view of its role as a car producer, and provided cars in bare chassis form to have their bodies fitted by one of the more prestigious bespoke body builders operating (in most cases) in the Paris area which reflected the way that most of France's auto-industry had, from the earliest days, been concentrated on this one region. The D6 therefore appeared, throughout its life, in a wide variety of shapes.

Many of France's leading coachbuilders created bodies for the D6, many of them descended from carriage builders from the pre-motorcar days. Body builders most frequently mentioned in connection with Delage include Letourneur & Marchand and their subsidiary, Autobineau, Henri Chapron, Henri Labourdette, Marius Franay and, especially after the coming together with Delahaye, Alphonse Guilloré.

== Chronology ==
The D6 was introduced in 1930 as a replacement for the Delage DM, but in view of the range of six-cylinder engines with which it was offered it could also be seen as a replacement for the smaller engined Delage DR.

In 1930 the D6 was one in a range of three Delage models on offer. The other two were the slightly lighter (but still six-cylinder powered) DS and, at the top of the range, the very large D8 launched the previous year. All three faced strong economic headwinds in the wake of the 1929 stockmarket crashes.

=== Delage D6 (1930 – 1933) ===
The original Delage D6 came with a choice of two chassis lengths, these being 3,149 mm (124.0 in) or 3,289 mm (129.5 in). The 6-cylinder engine had a displacement of 3045 cc. Listed maximum power was 75 hp (56 kW), produced at 3,600 rpm.

By the time production of the original Delage D6 ended, in 1933, 1160 had been produced.

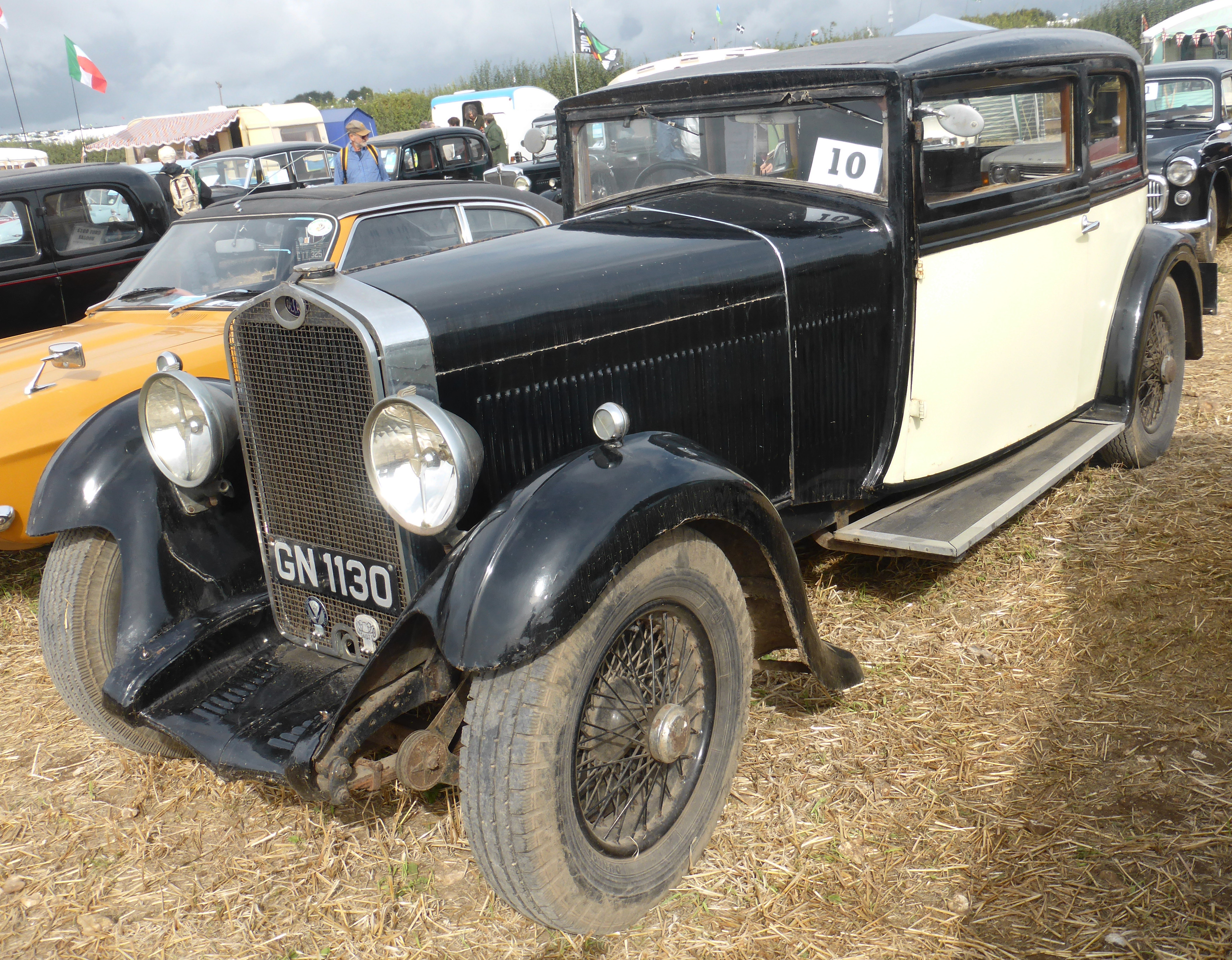
1930 Delage D6 Long Chapron

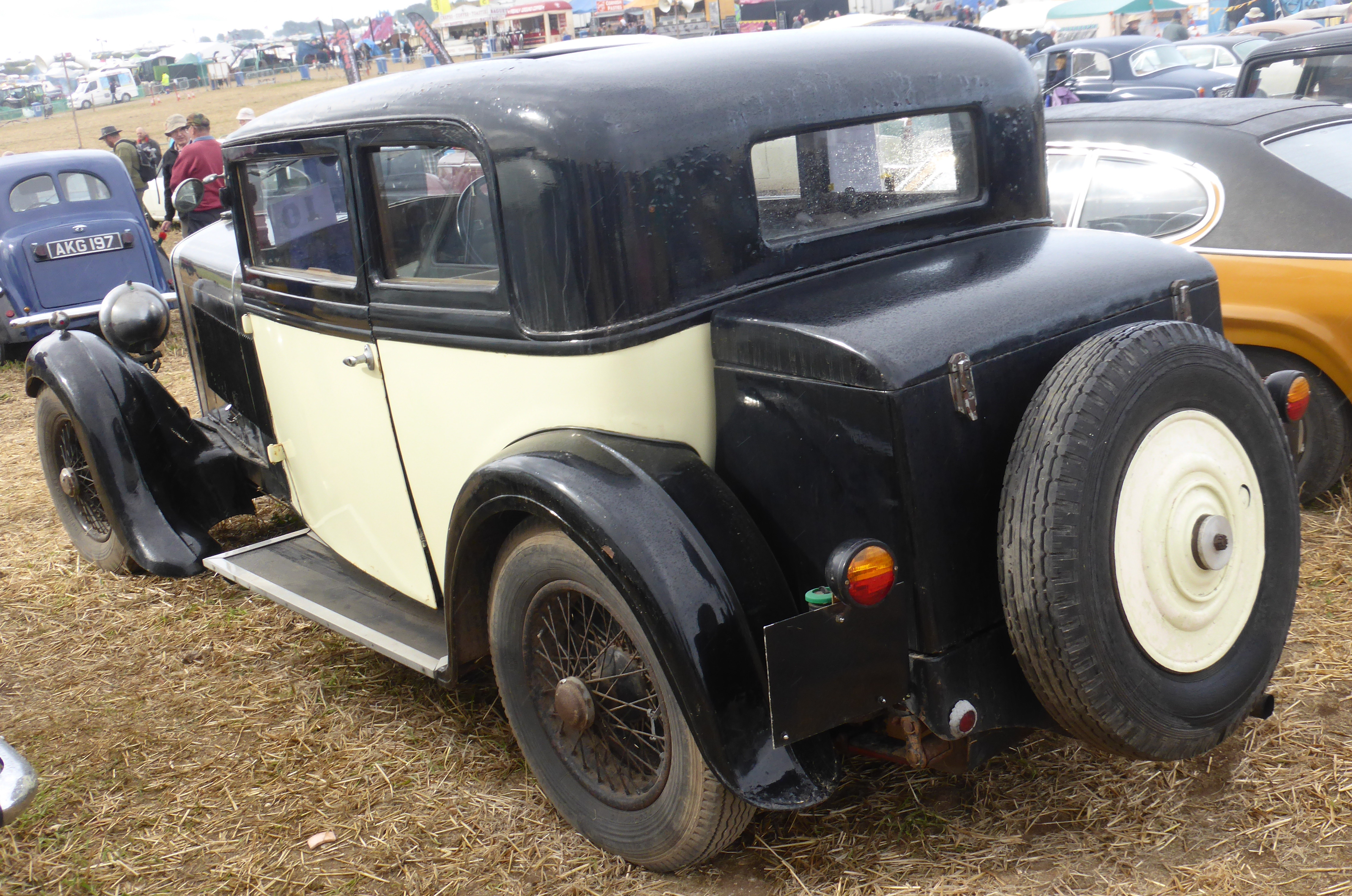
1930 Delage D6 Long Chapron

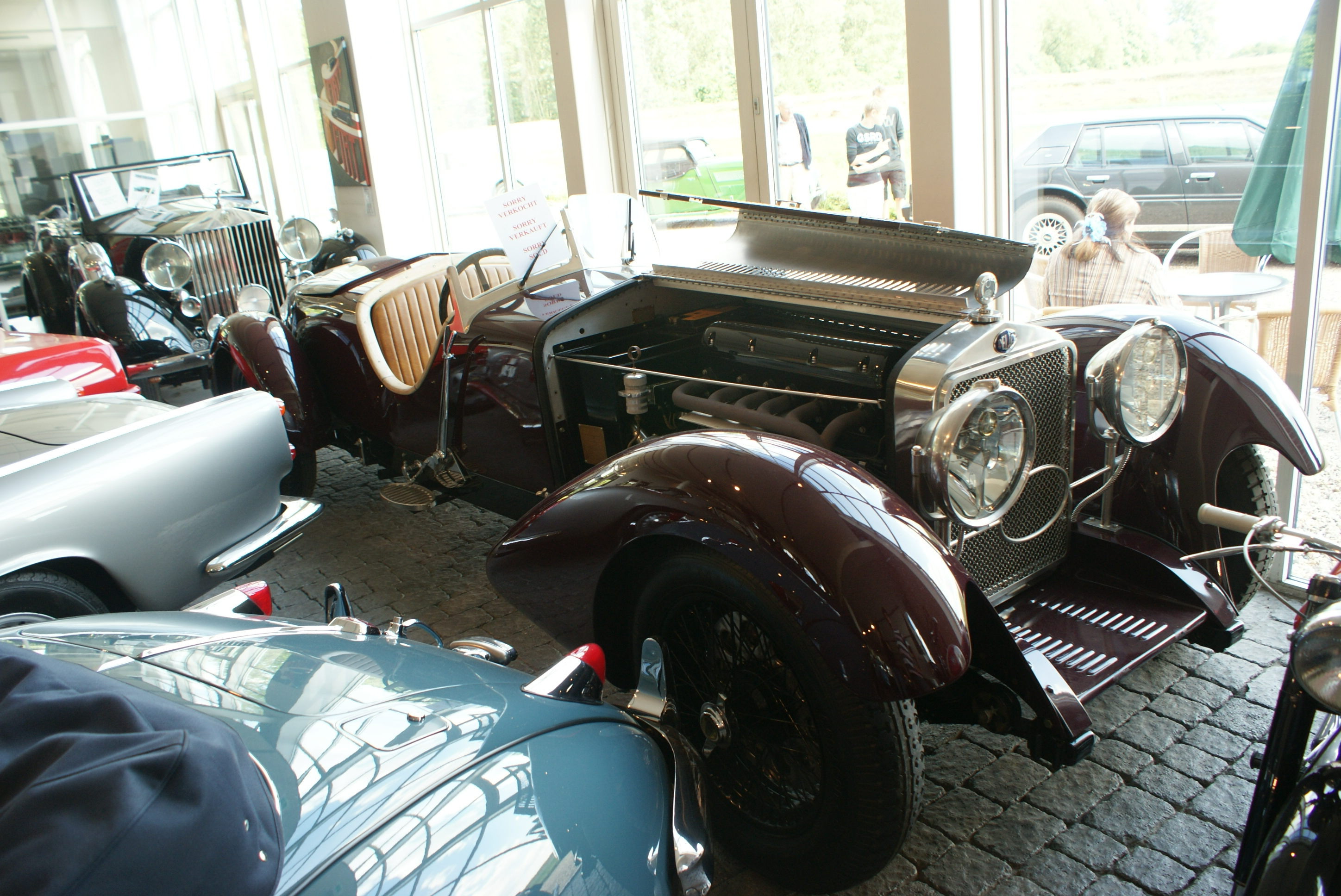
1929 Delage D6 DM Guillaume Busson roadster (chassis 28 055)

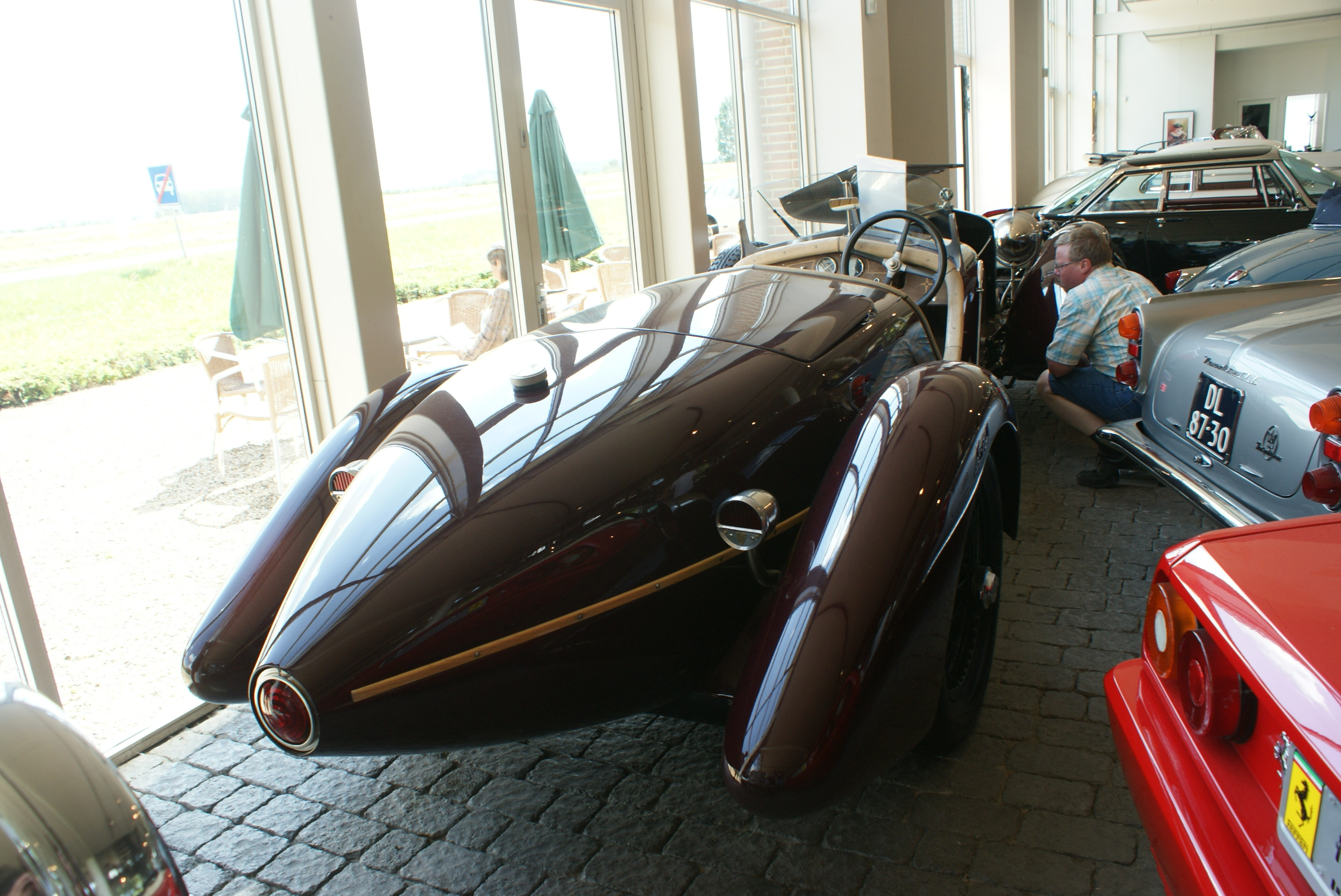
1929 Delage D6 DM Guillaume Busson roadster (chassis 28 055)

=== Delage D6-11 (1932 – 1934) ===
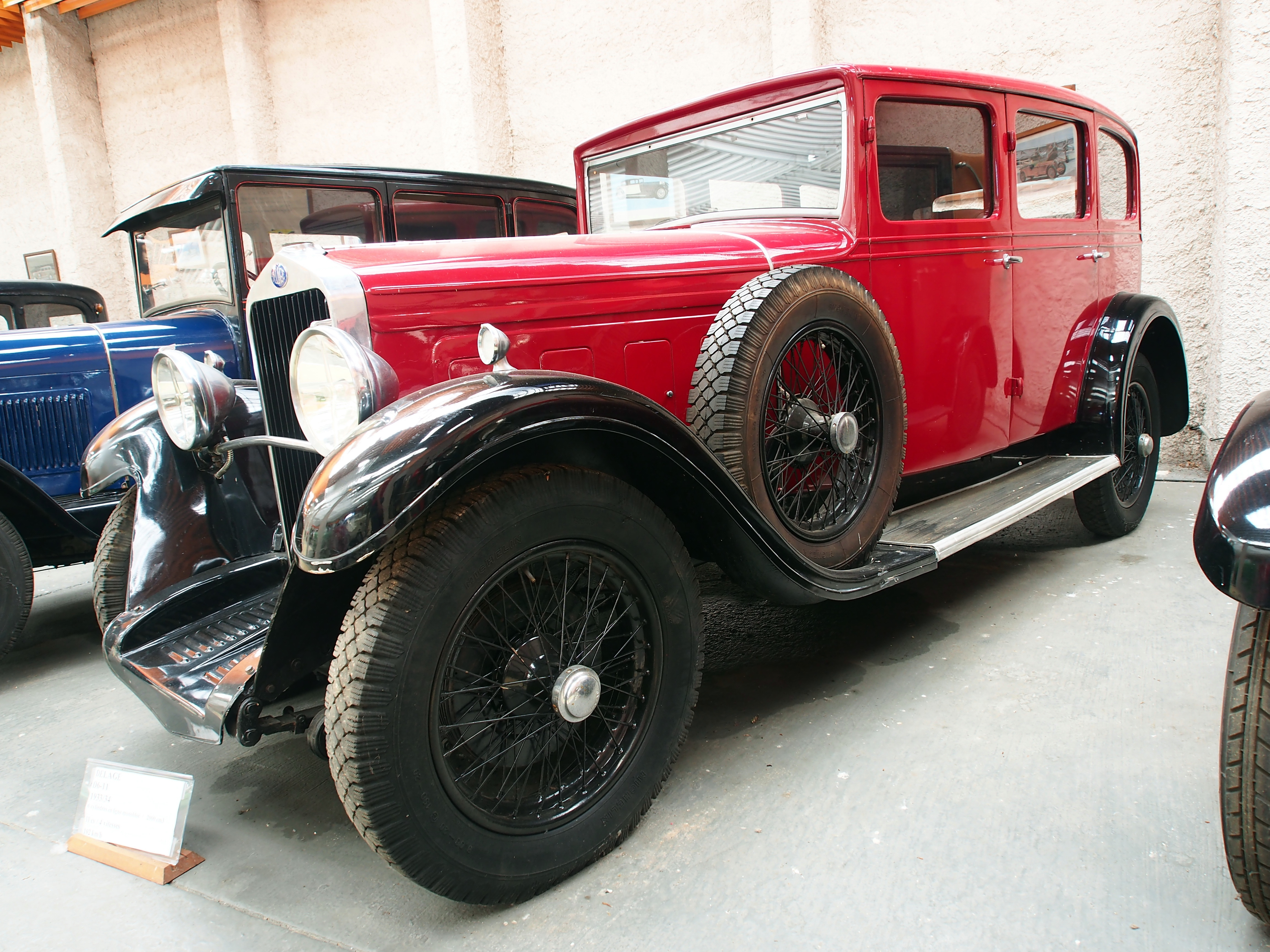
Delage D6-11

A complementary model, the D6-11, was presented at the 26th Paris Motor Show in October 1932, although production only got under way the following Spring. The D6-11 was a more economical version of the original DE6. The “-11" suffix referred to the fiscal horsepower which was a function of the cylinder diameters and determined the level of annual car tax to be paid by owners in France. The 2001 cc 6-cylinder engine came with a listed maximum power output of 55 hp (41 kW) at 4,000 rpm. There was also a special "S" version ( "S" standing for Surbaisse-French for "lowered") of the D6-11 known as the D6-11S which was built on a specially lowered, shorter wheelbase chassis for which 60 hp (45 kW) at 4,500 rpm was claimed. Only a small number of the D6-11S were built.

The manufacturers' price list at the motor show in October 1933 listed ten different "standard" body types offered for the car. What they had in common was that the prices were high for a car in the 11CV car tax band/class. In bare chassis form the 6-11 was priced at 31,600 francs for a "normal" standard length chassis and 32,600 francs for a long version. There was also a price of 33,600 francs for a "normal" length sports chassis. The wheelbase lengths in question were 3,060 mm (120 in) (normal) and 3,260 mm (128 in) (long).

The last D6-11 was produced in 1934. Its direct replacement, the D60-12, entered production only in 1936

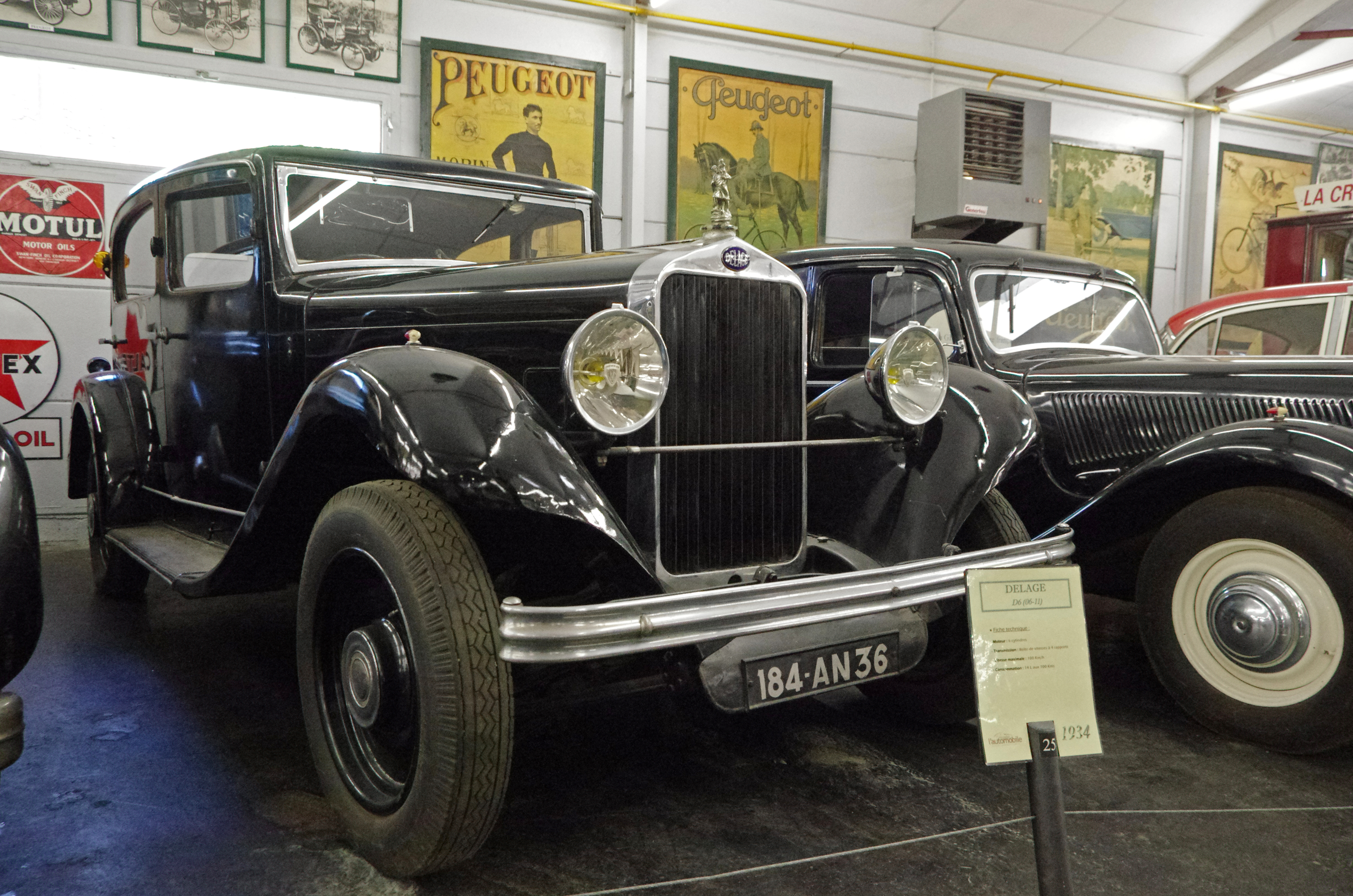
1934 Delage D6-11

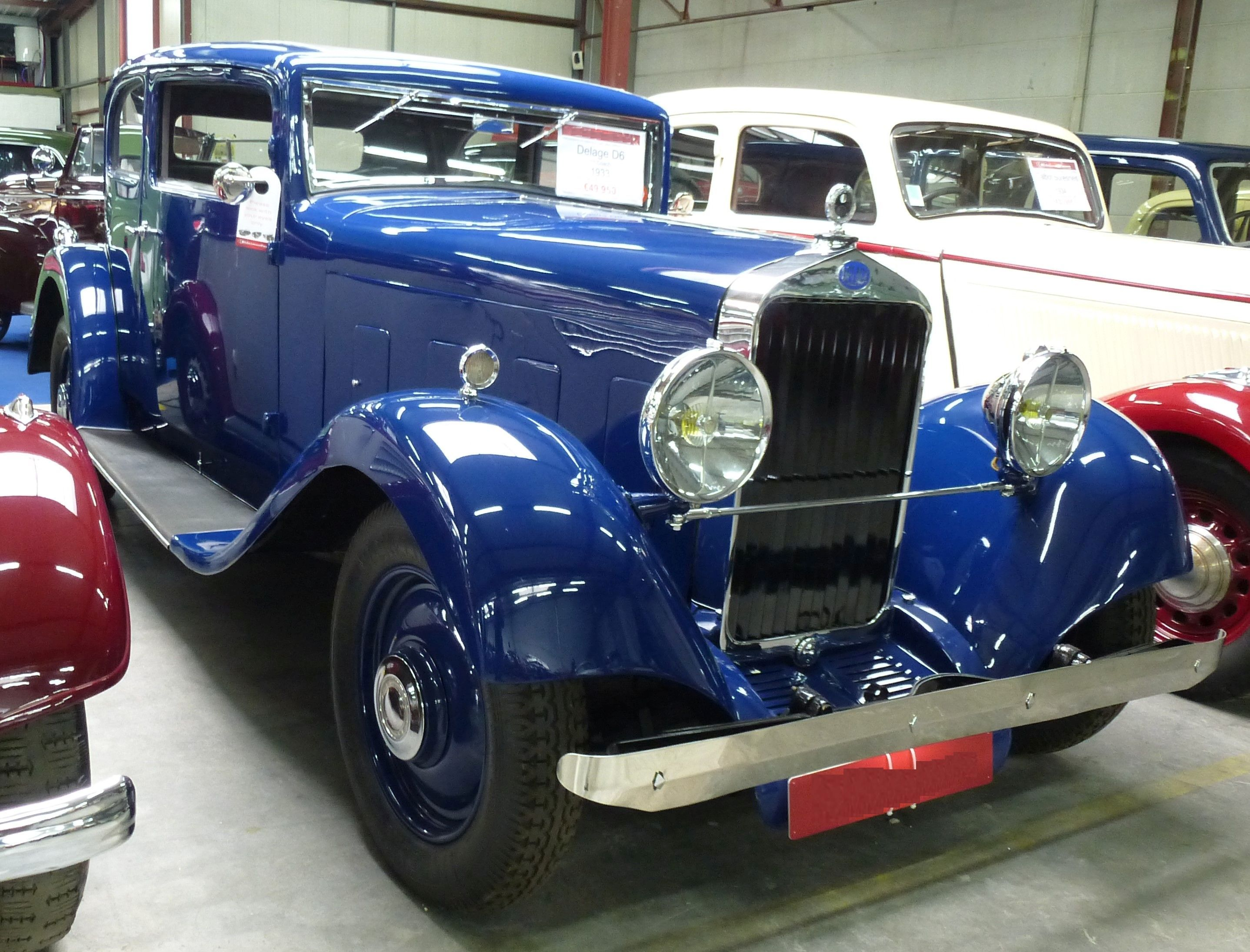
1933 Delage D6-11

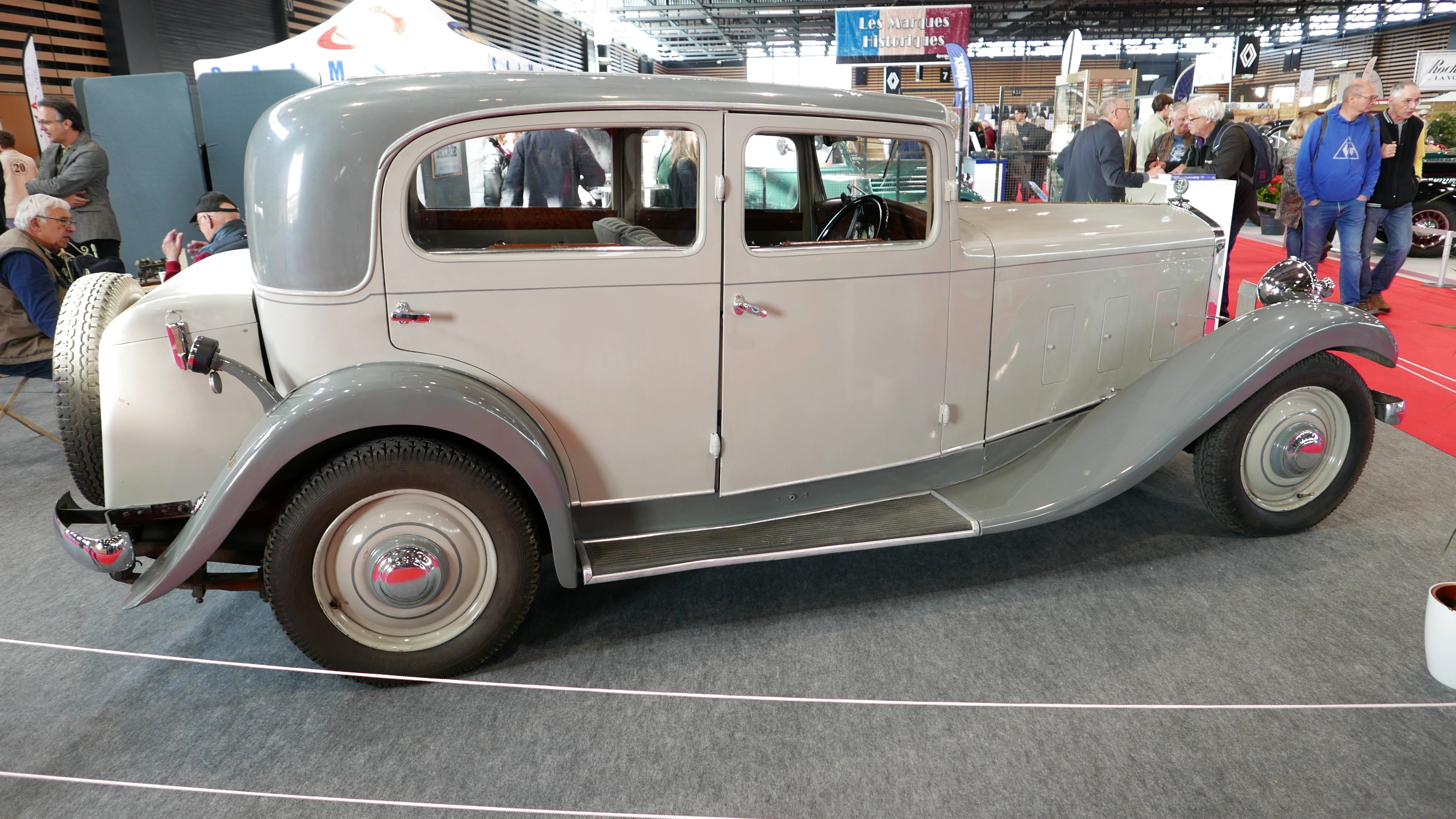
1933 Delage Type D6-11 berline

=== Delage D6-65 (1934 – 1935) ===
In 1934, the new Delage D6-65, appeared, now with a 3,378 mm (133.0 in) chassis. The 6-cylinder engine had a displacement of 2678 cc. Listed maximum power, as identified in the suffix on the name, was 65 hp (48 kW), produced at 4,000 rpm.

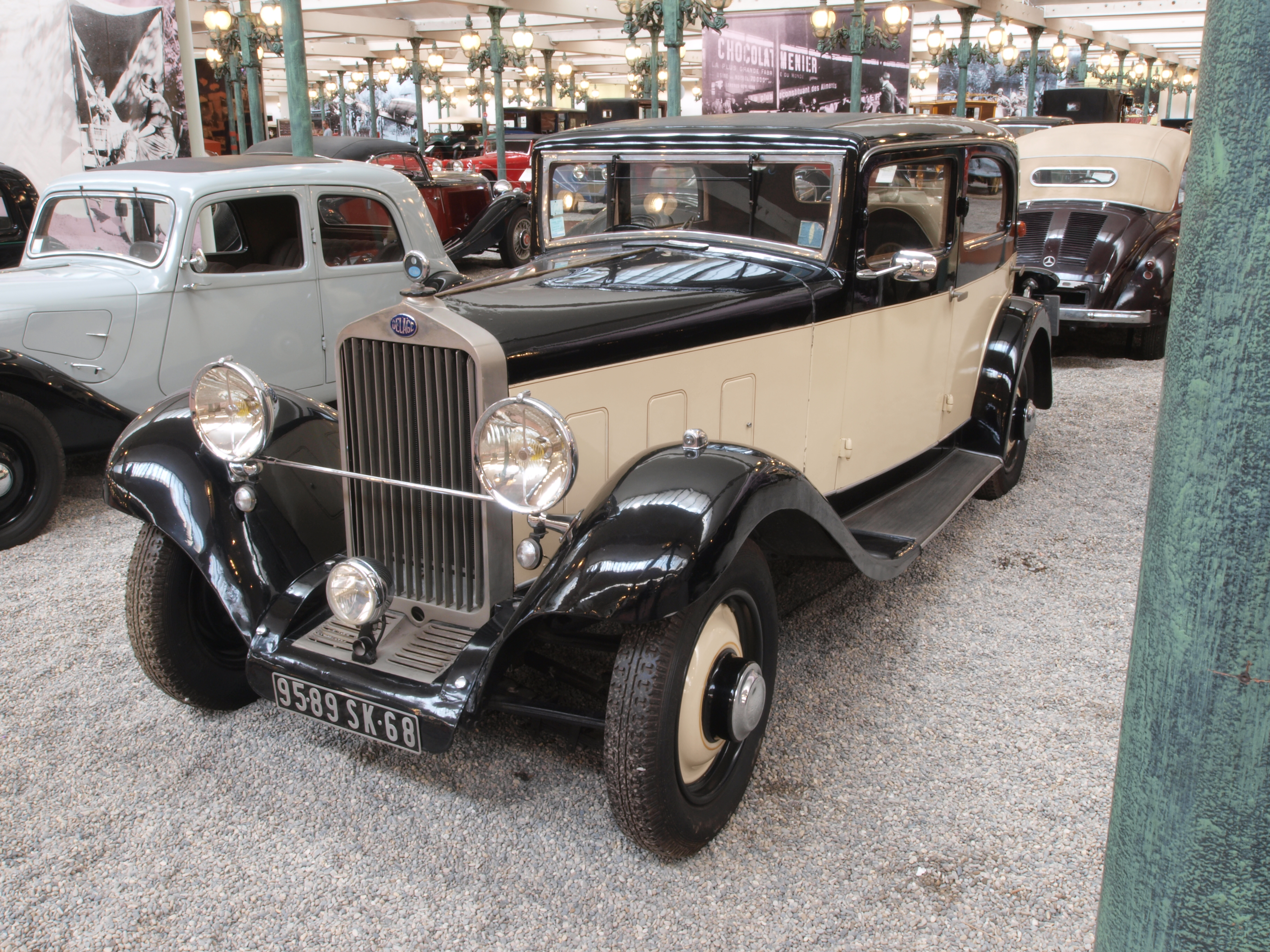
Delage D6 Berline

=== Delage D6-60 (1935 – 1937) ===
As the company succumbed to its financial difficulties, in April, 1935, the plant at Courbevoie, which Delage had occupied since 1910, produced its last car, and the process began which would leave Delage as a simple affiliate of Delahaye by 1938. In 1935 Delage retained a separate management, but production was transferred to the Delahaye factory, in the 13th arrondissement of Paris. The Delage range was rearranged in order to facilitate the sharing of production facilities.

As part of this process, the Delage D6-65 was replaced by the Delage D6-60. It was available only with a 3,150 mm (124 in) wheelbase, shared with the four-cylinder Delahaye models such as the 134N. Delages retained their own engine designs, and the D6-60 came with a straight 6 of 2335 cc which was increased to 2528 cc at the Motor Show in October 1936 in time for the 1937 model year. Maximum power now rose from 56 hp (42 kW) to 67 hp (50 kW) at 3,500 rpm. At the end of 1937 the D6-60 was taken out of production.

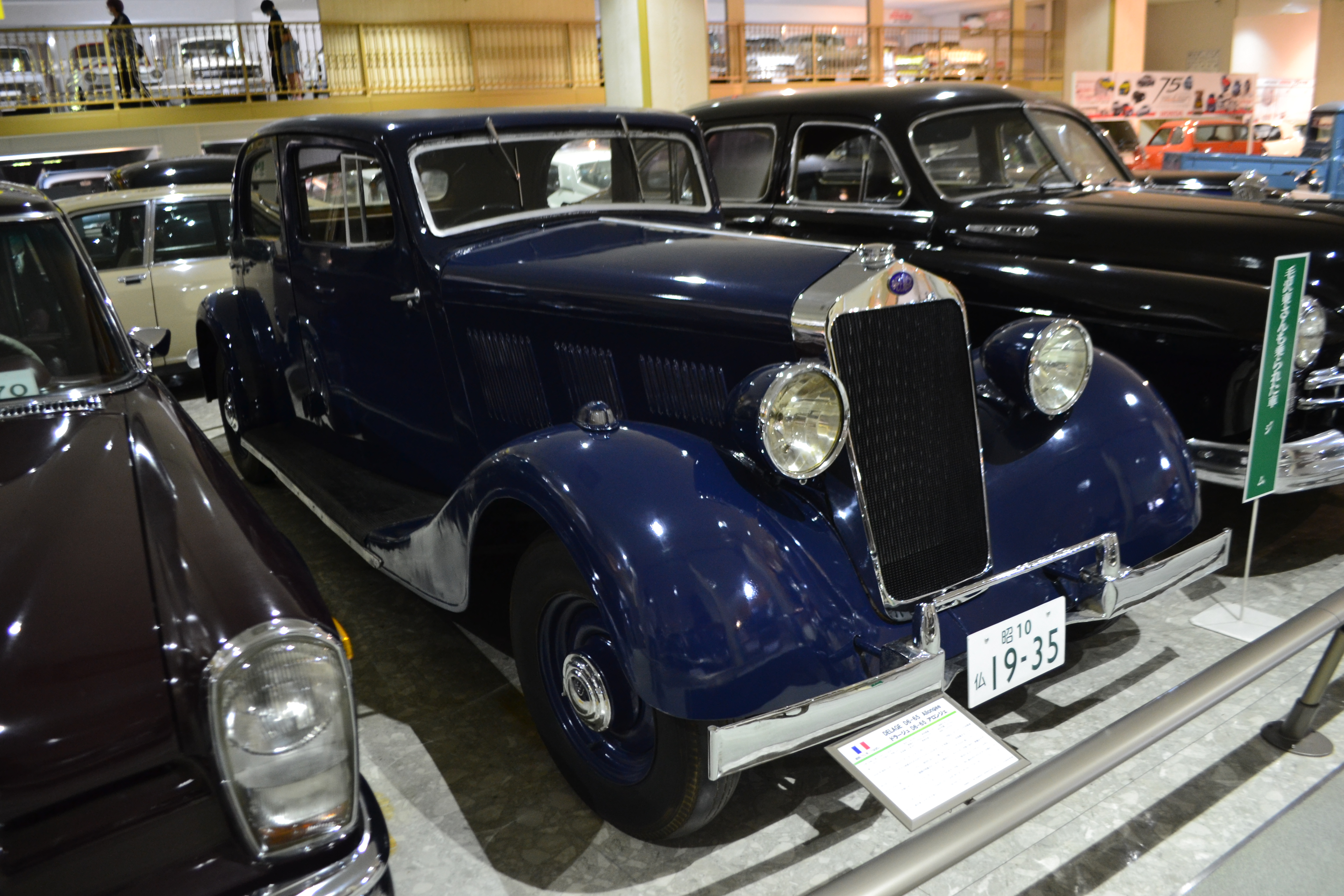
1935 Delage D6-65 Allongee

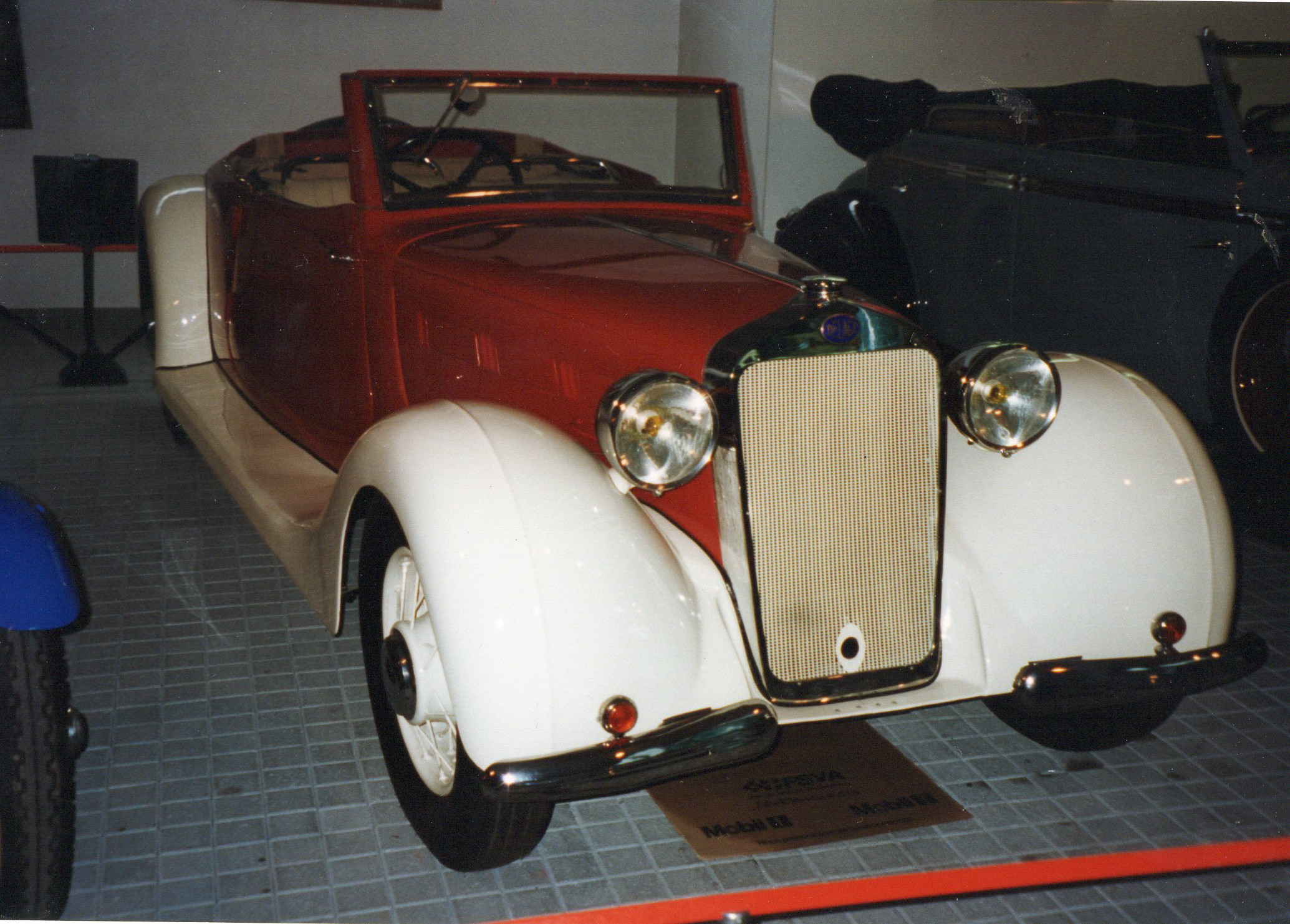
1937 Delage Type D6-60 Citroën Roadster (chassis 50 484)

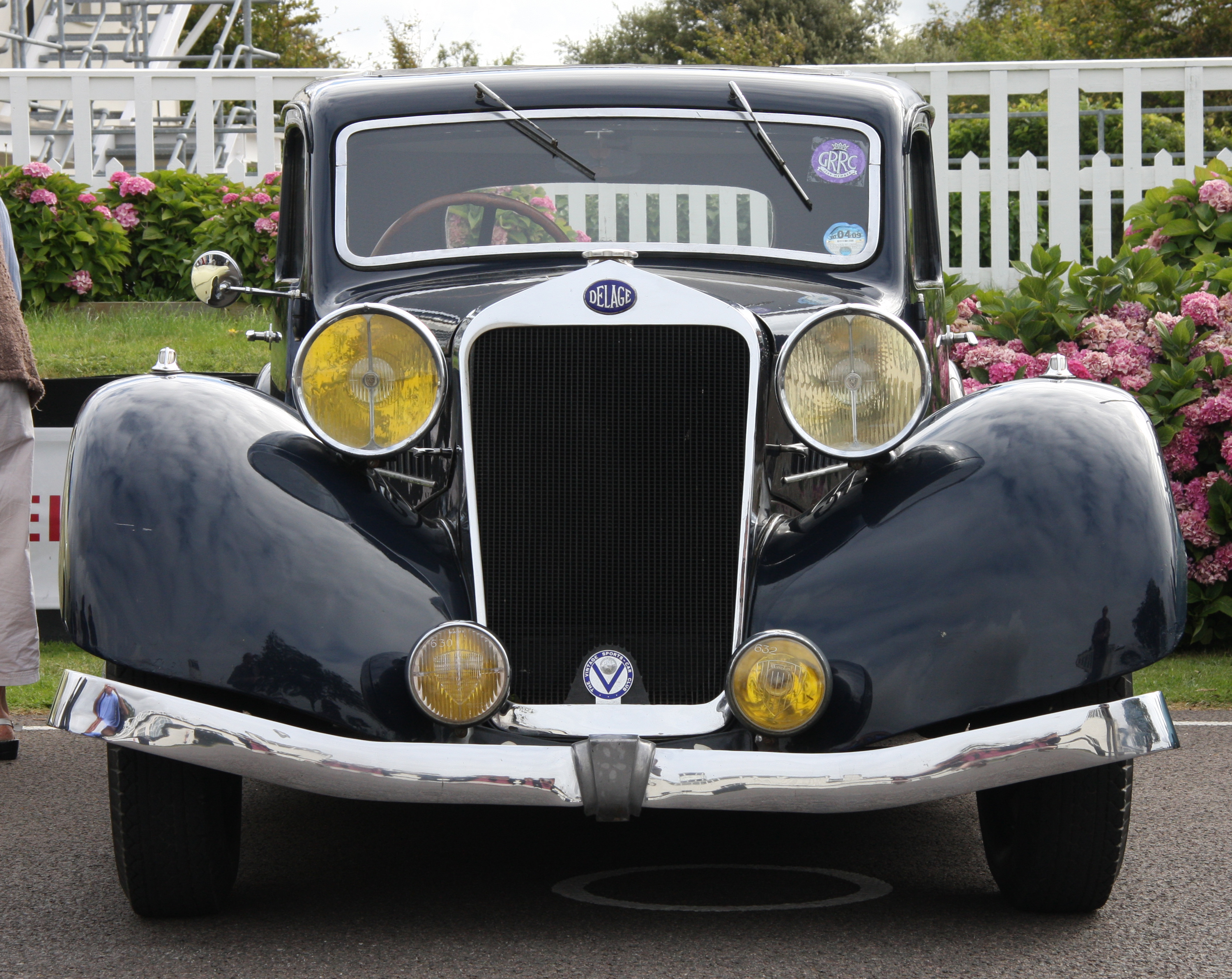
1936 Type D6-60 S Letourneur & Marchand berline (chassis 50 353)

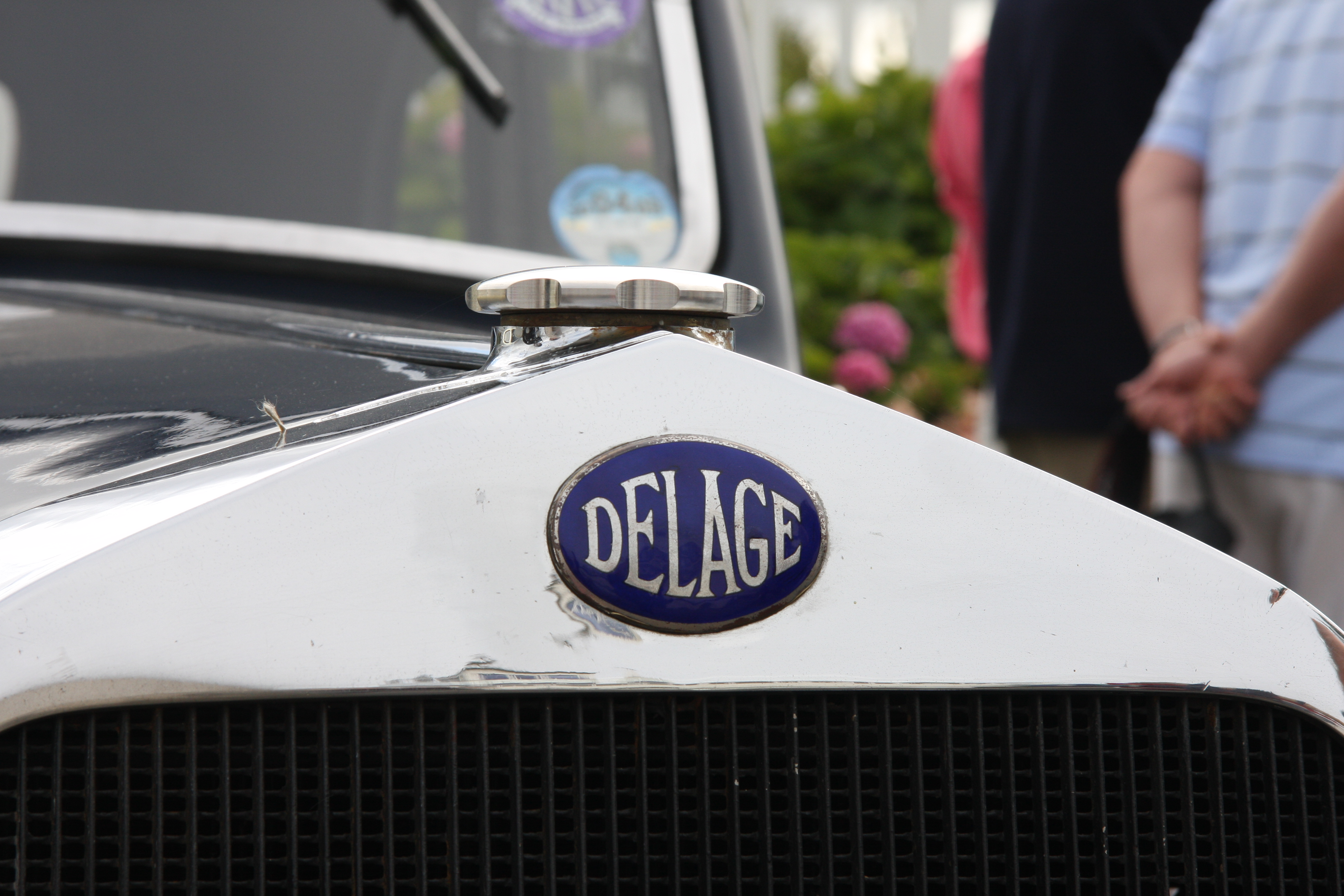

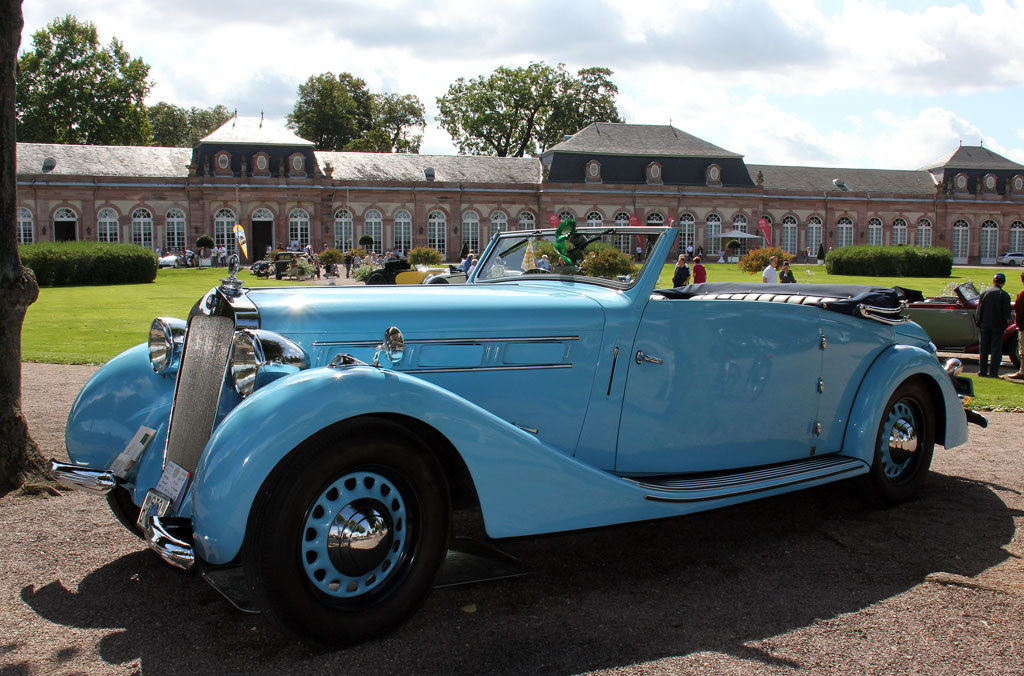
1937 Delage Type D6-60 Chapron cabriolet (chassis 50 479)

=== Delage D6-80 (1935 – 1937) ===
Also introduced in time for 1936 was the Delage D6-80. Initially, this was powered by a 3227 cc in line 6-cylinder engine for which maximum power of 72 hp (54 kW) is listed. The D6-80 was a long vehicle. Like other Delages at this time, the D6-80 shared its wheelbase – in this case of 3,350 mm (132 in) – with a Delahaye. In the case of cars and the accompanying information presented at the 1936 motor show for 1937 cars, the Delage D6-80 also shared its 3557 cc six-cylinder 90 hp (67 kW) engine with a Delahaye, although the switch to a Delahaye engine was not immediately implemented in respect of the cars provided for sale.

By 1938 the D6-80 had disappeared from the Delage range.

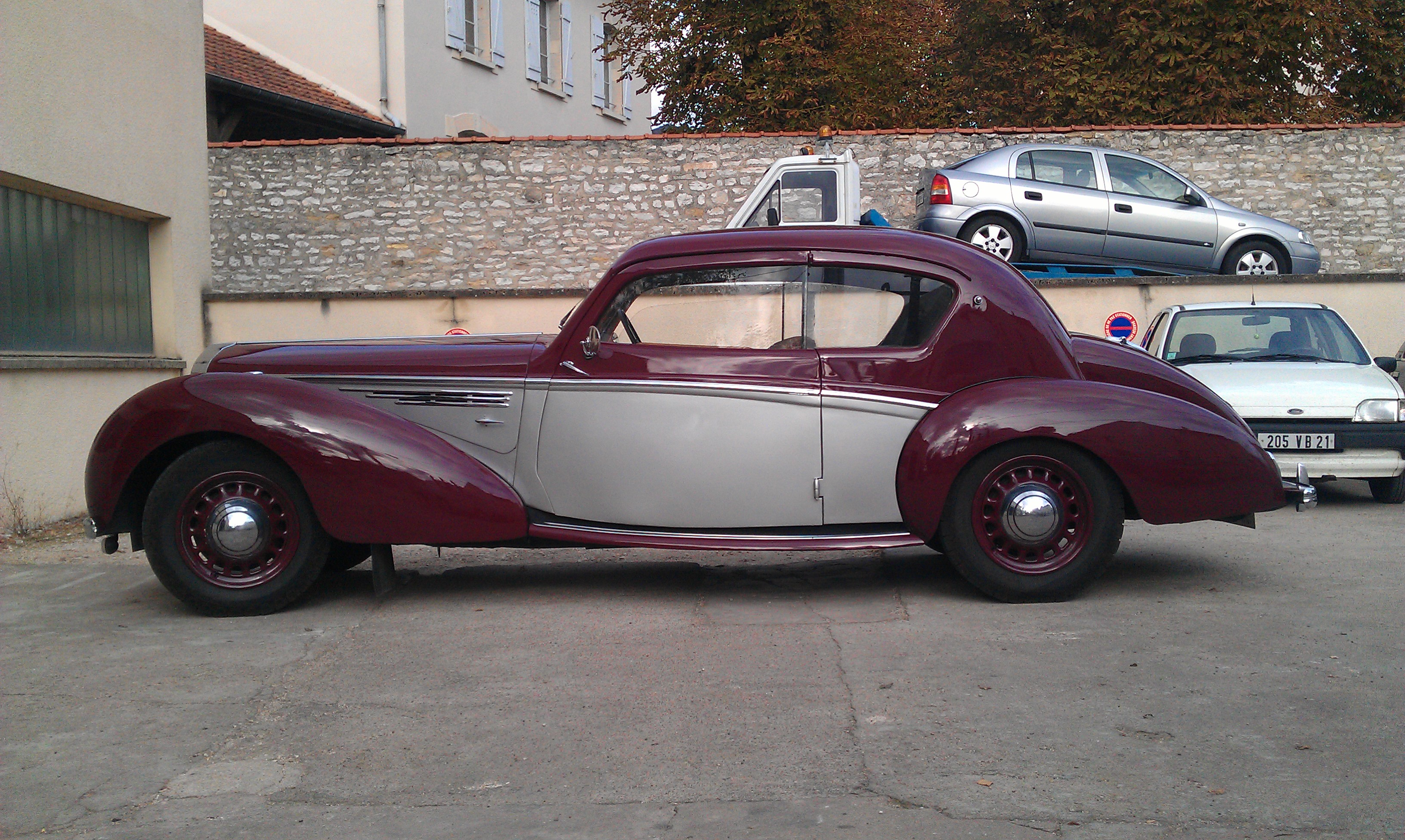
Delage D6-70 with "Coach" body by Letourneur et Marchand

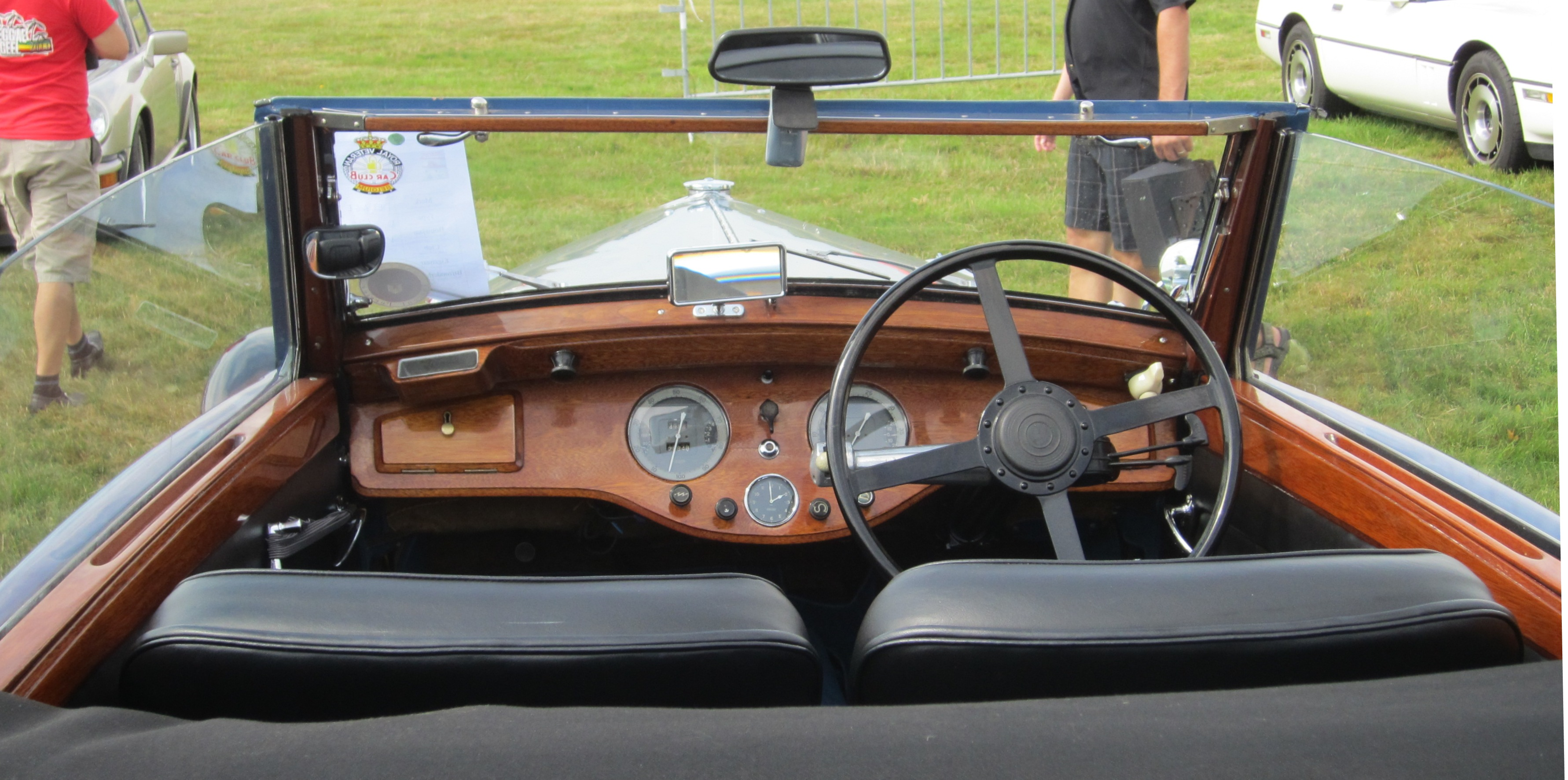
Delage D66-70 Control Panel

=== Delage D6-70 (1937 – 1938) ===
For 1937, Delage presented the D6-70. The car was effectively a rebadged D6-60S, which in turn was a derivation of the D6-60. The D6-70 sat on the same 3,150 mm (124 in) wheelbase as the D6-60 which was withdrawn from sale a few months after its launch. The car's straight-six engine was of 2729 cc displacement and was not shared with any Delage. Maximum output is listed as 78 hp (58 kW) though as before, sources differ. The D6-70 seems to have been the star of the Delage 6-cylinder range at this time, with some bodies provided including the "Coach Panoramique" 2-door sports saloon from Letourneur & Marchand, a Chapron cabriolet bodied car depicted in the 1937 Delage catalogue, and a "Berline" (saloon/sedan) from Autobineau.

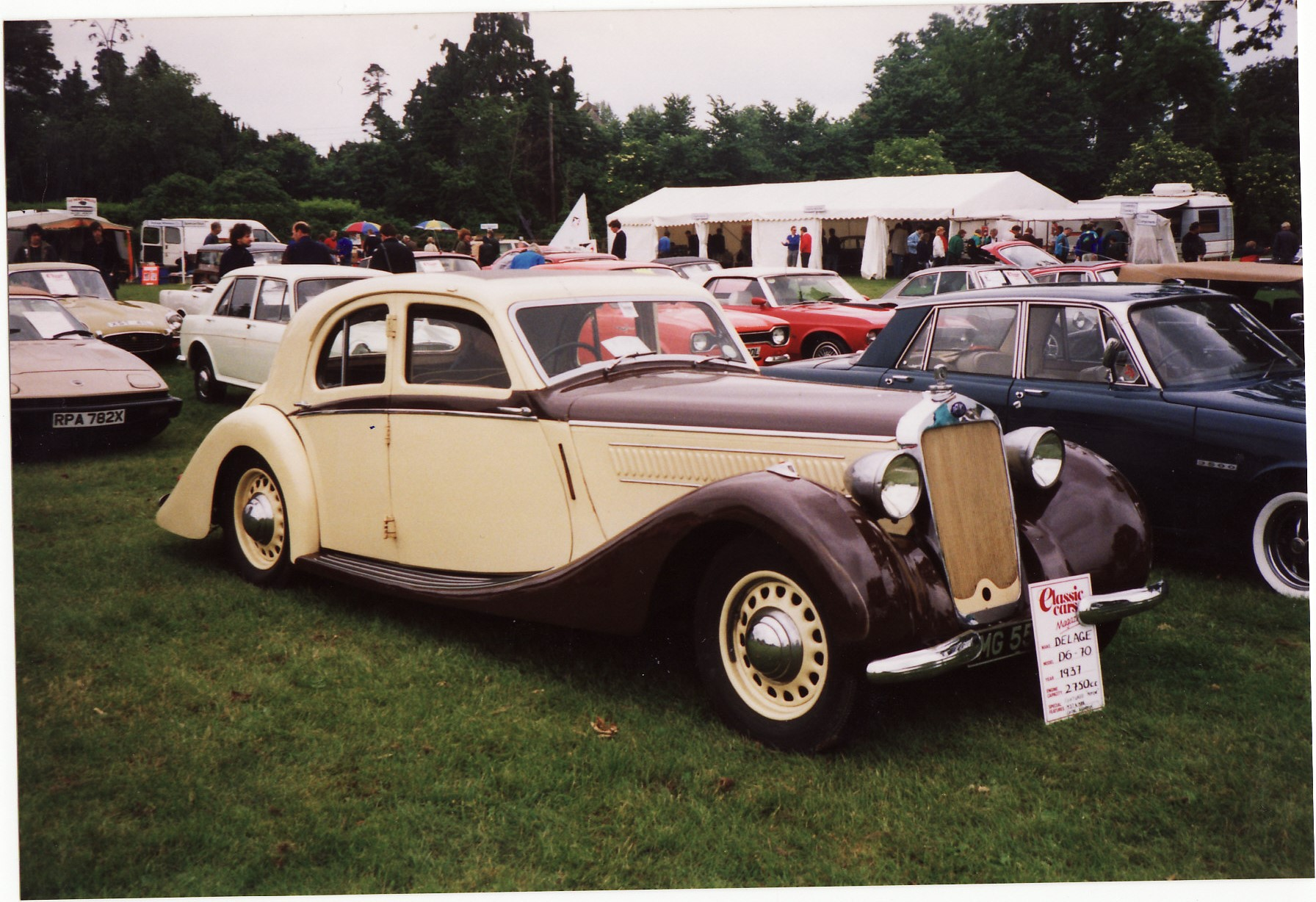
1937 Delage D6-70

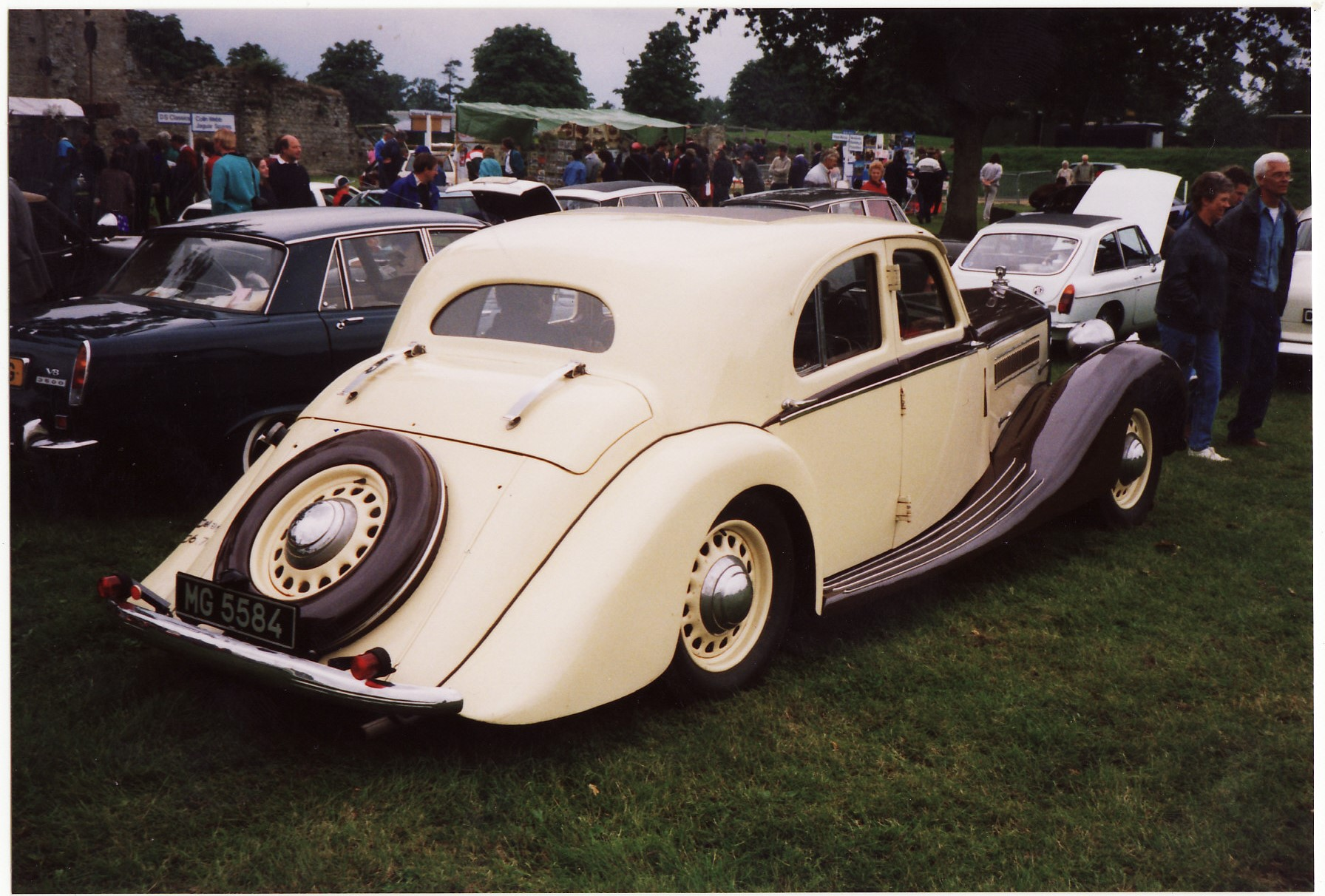
1937 Delage D6-70

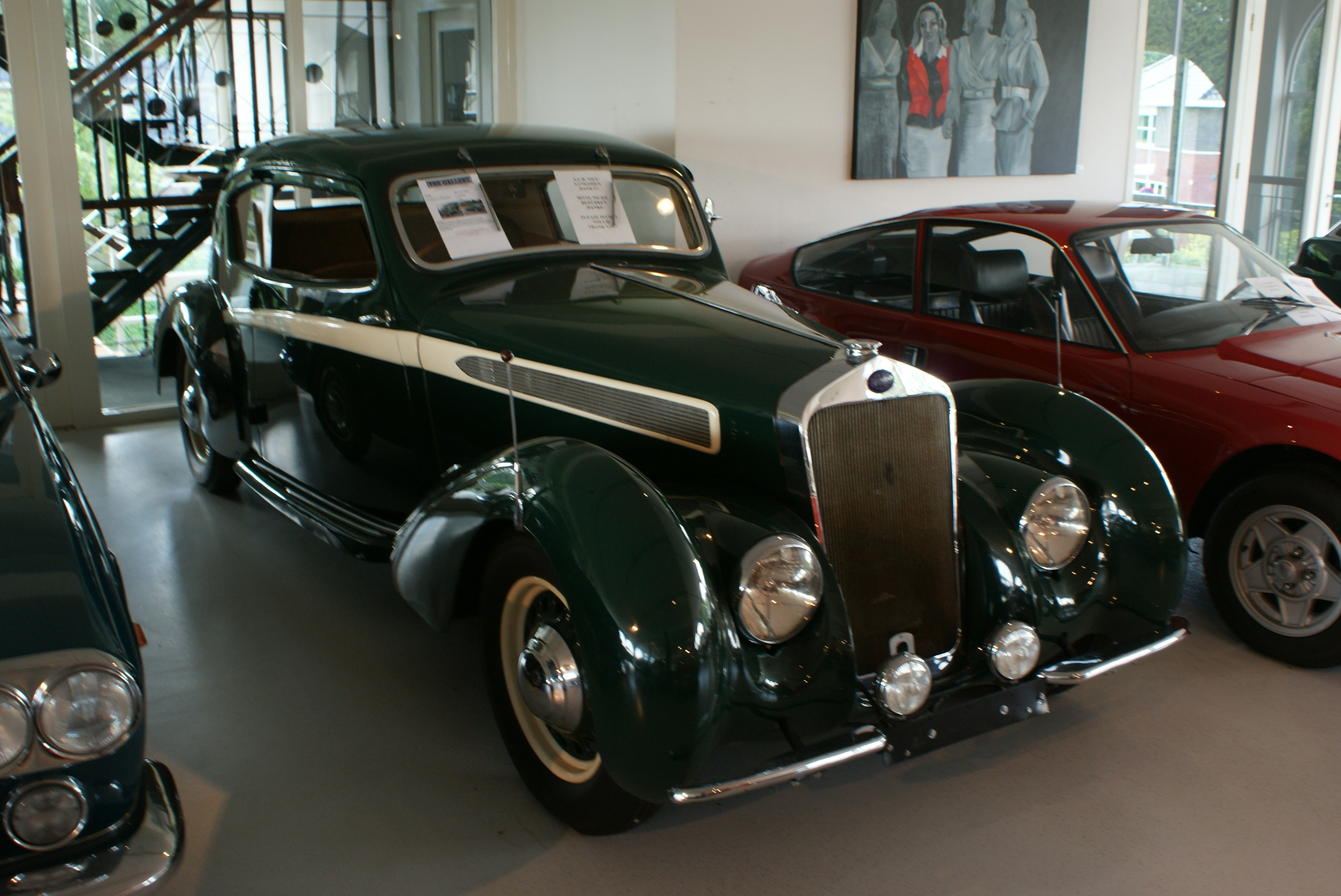
1938 Delage Type D6-70 Letourneur & Marchand coupe (chassis 51 329)

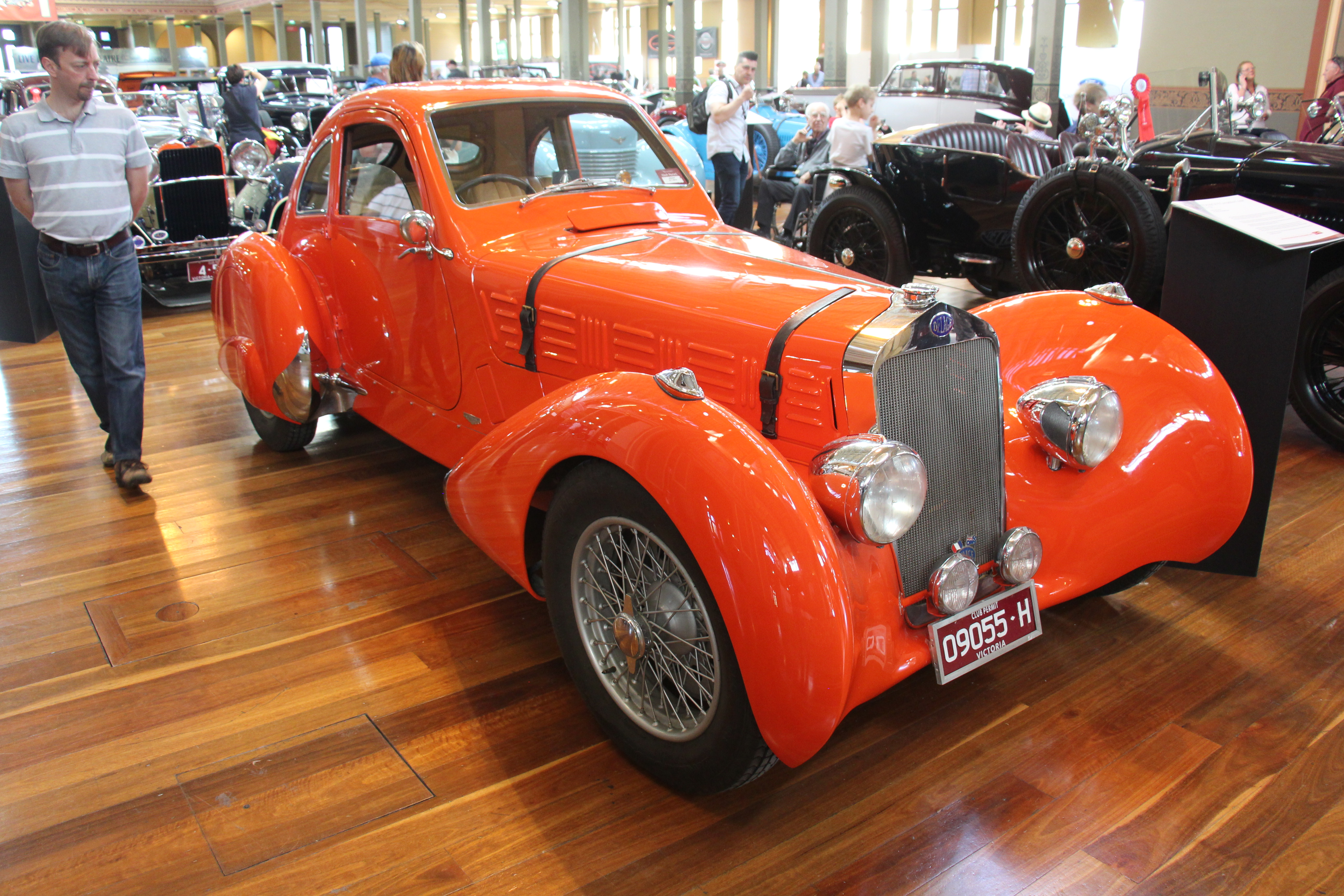
1936 Type D6-70 "Spéciale" Figoni & Falaschi coach (chassis 50 688)

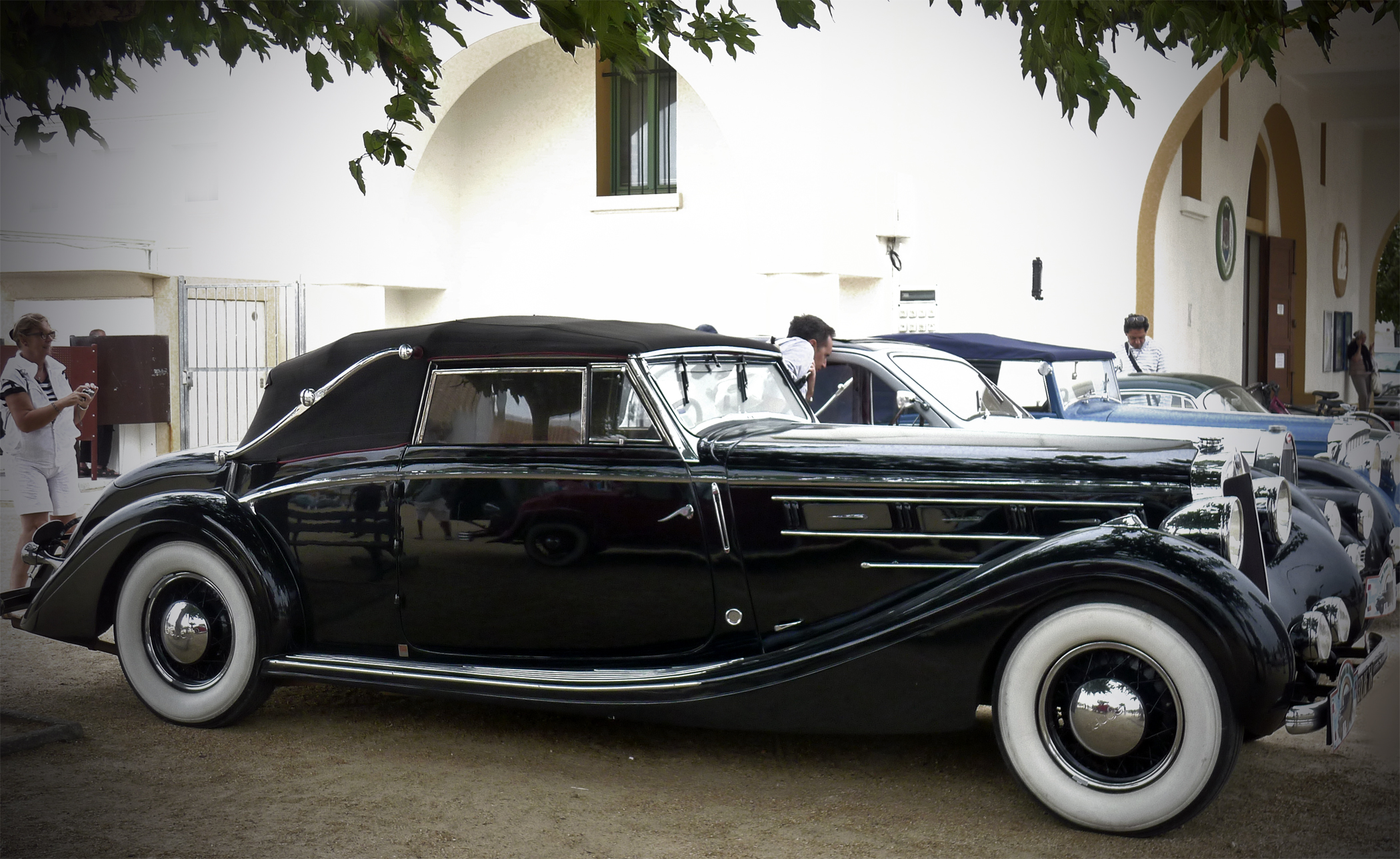
Delage D6-70

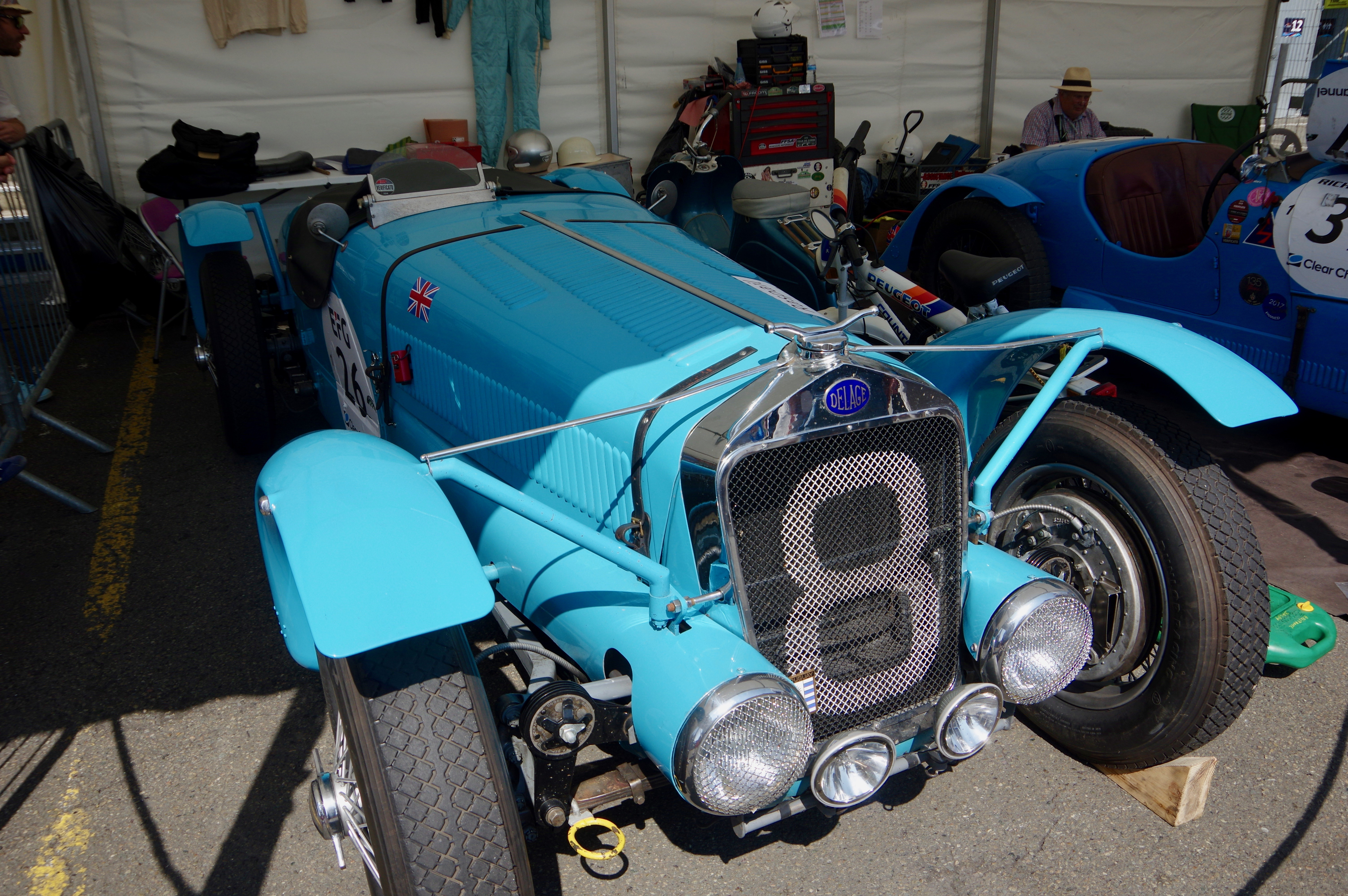
1936 Delage D6-70S

=== Delage D6-75 (1939 – 1940) ===
The D6-75 appeared for 1939, effectively replacing the D6-70 which had by now been withdrawn. Its 2798 cc 6-cylinder engine was considered particularly refined. Power output was quoted at 95 hp (71 kW). In 1940, production was ended by the rapid invasion of northern France, following the declaration of war at the end of the previous summer.

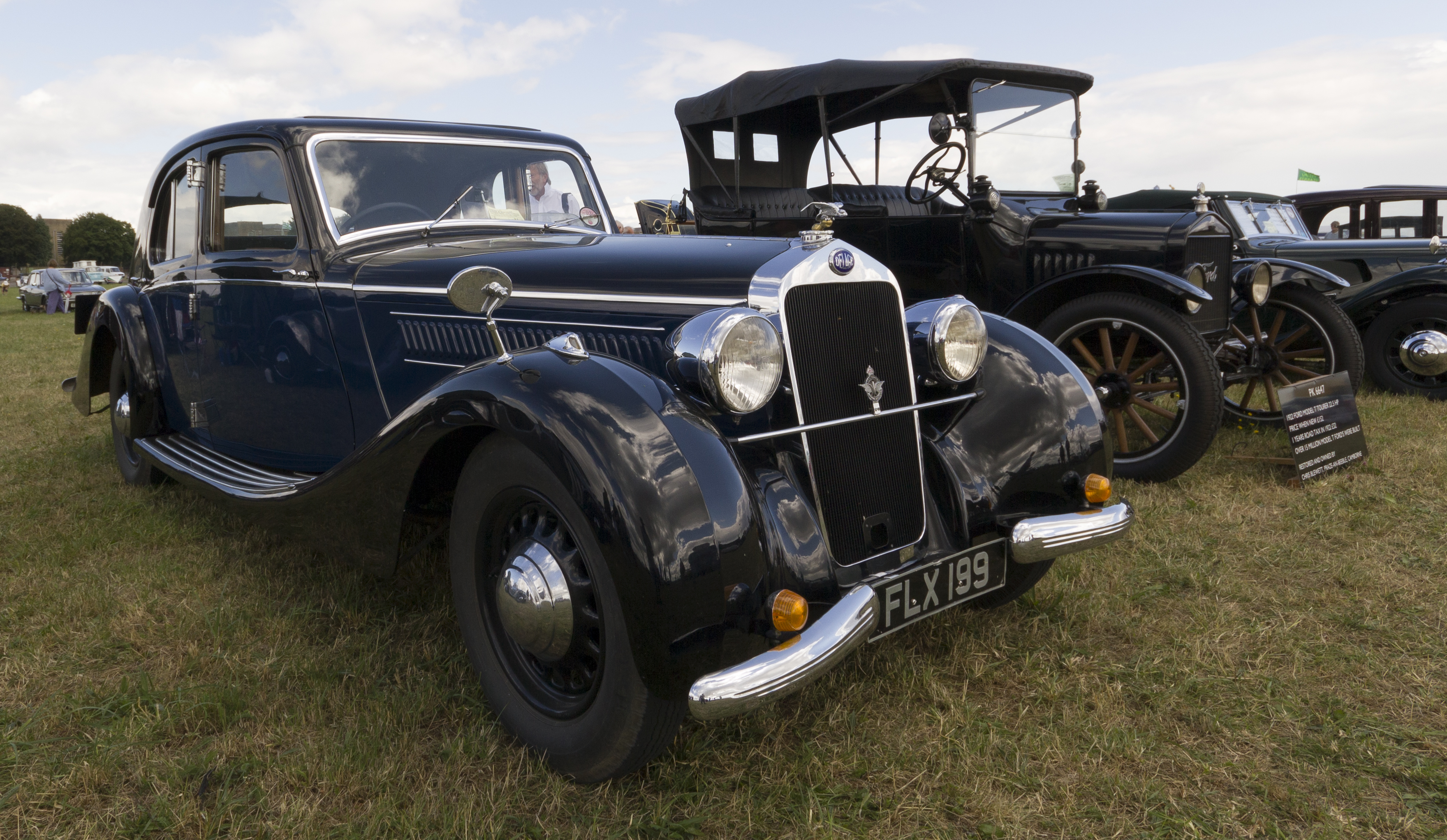
Delage D6-75 4-door sports saloon

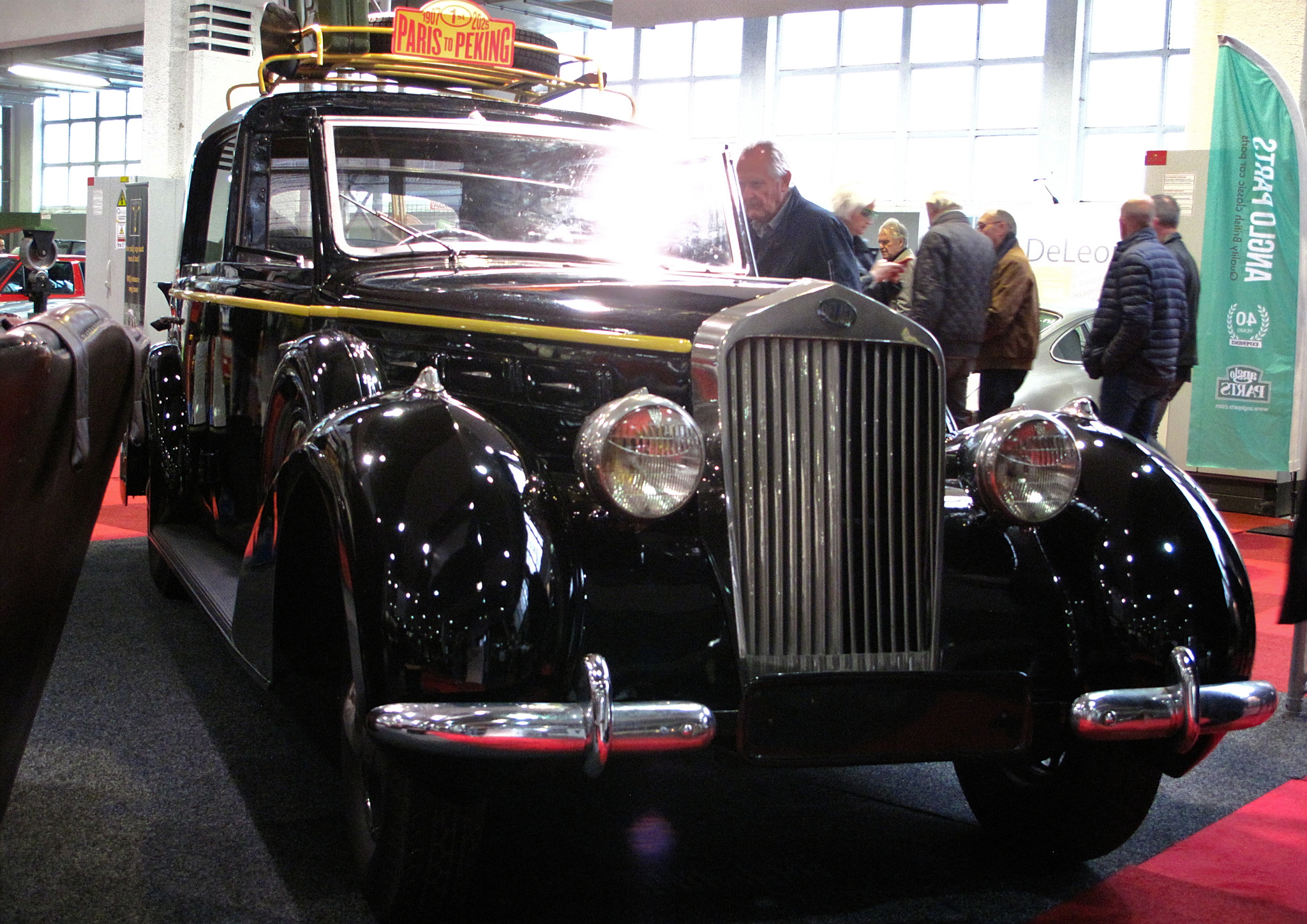
1936 Delage Type D6-75 Coupé Chauffeur (chassis 51 797)

=== Delage D6 3-litre (1946 – 1954) ===
By the end of the war, Delage was firmly in the hands of Delahaye, Delage's British born chief, Walter Watney, having found himself obliged to leave France in 1942. Louis Delâge himself had not been welcome at the company that bore his name since 1935, and would die at the end of 1947.

1946 found Delage production resuming with a single model, the D6 3-litre, slotting in below the larger and (even) more powerful models for which Delahaye used their own name. Many things had changed in the intervening years, but post-war Delages, like the Delahayes, still had their steering wheels on the right, something which would have been mainstream in France thirty years earlier, but which now very firmly set the high-luxury end cars apart from the Peugeots, Renaults, Citroëns, Panhards, and Simcas that many French citizens would have seen daily on the roads, and which the more fortunate among them might have aspired to drive or purchase.

The D6 3-litre now came with a 2984 cc straight-6 engine. Quoted power of 90 hp (67 kW) at 3,800 rpm was slightly down on the figure quoted for the pre-war D6-70, possibly reflecting a lower compression ratio enforced by the lower octanes of the fuel available to car buyers at this time. Performance would have varied according to the weight and shape of the body fitted, but a top speed of approximately 135 km/h (84 mph) was quoted by the manufacturer.

The bespoke body builders had less work now than in the 1930s, but their craft based methods enabled them to respond more immediately to new styling trends than the volume automakers, and many of the Delages from the late 1940s and early 1950s look strangely modern when compared to the early post war products from Renault, Peugeot and Citroën. The coach builders were willing and able more immediately to copy and build on the developments in car design that during the early 1940s had been more apparent in North America than in Europe. Nevertheless, the Delage D6-3-litre of 1948 – 1954 came with exactly the same 3,150 mm (124 in) that had been standard on successive D6s since 1935. A longer 3,330 mm (131 in) was also available for longer bodies such as those for Limousine style cars.

The Delage D6 3-litre was listed as part of the Delahaye-Delage range till 1954: it is thought that the last of the cars, in bare chassis form, were constructed during the closing months of 1953, but the final batch were still available for purchase during 1954, most of them bodied by Chapron. 1954 marked the exit from auto-production of both brands. The political context and the state of the post-war French economy were hostile to large cars in France. In 1954 even Henry Ford gave up on French auto-production, selling his business to Simca. By 1955 Delahaye had been taken over by Hotchkiss whose own business now survived, at least for the time being, not from producing luxury cars but on the basis of rebuilding and, by now increasingly building from scratch, Jeep based vehicles.

=== Delage D6 Olympic (1946 – 1949) ===
The D6 3-litre came in its standard form with only one carburettor; in 1946 a performance version, the Delage D6 Olympic, was presented. The Olympic used the same engine block, but was fitted with a triple carburettor fuel feed system. This gave rise to an output of 100 hp (74 kW), now with the engine spinning up to 4,500 rpm, and corresponding with a top speed of approximately 140 km/h (87 mph). This may have been in connection with the 3-litre Delage racing cars which were much in evidence during the 1948 racing season. However, in 1949 this performance version of the D6 was withdrawn.
