= Delage =

1905-1953 French automotive brand manufacturer

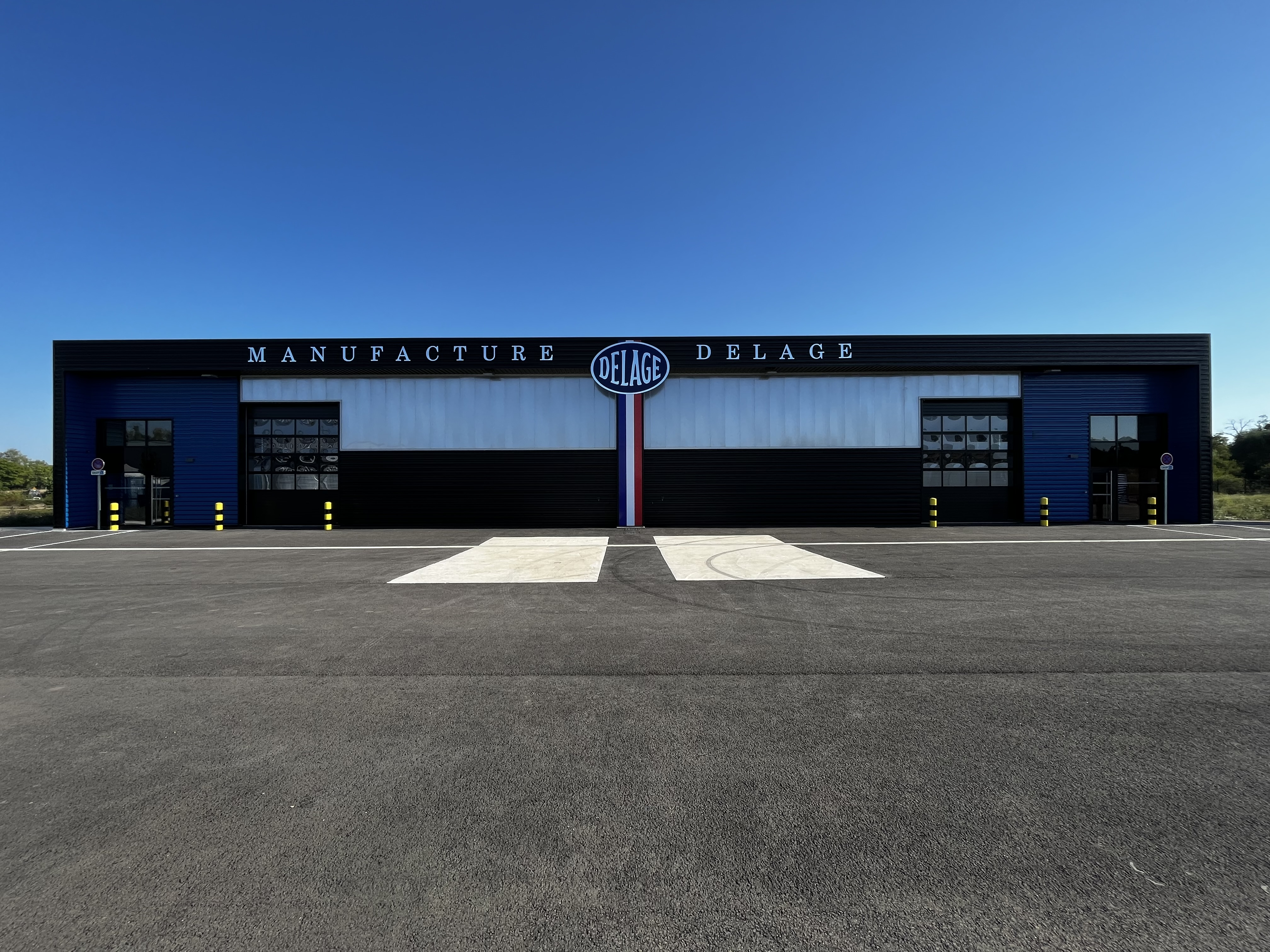
- Delage plant in Magny-Cours
- Industry: Automotive
- Founded: 1905; 121 years ago (original); 7 November 2019; 6 years ago (revival)
- Founder: Louis Delâge
- Defunct: 1953-2019
- Headquarters: Levallois-Perret, France
- Key people: Laurent Tapie (President)
- Products: Cars
- Website: www.delage.fr

Delage is a French luxury automobile and racecar company founded in 1905 by Louis Delâge in Levallois-Perret near Paris; it was acquired by Delahaye in 1935 and ceased operation in 1953. A new incarnation created by the association which acquired the rights to the name in 1956, "Les Amis de Delage", was announced in 2019. Delage Automobiles has attempted to restart production with the Delage D12.

== Early history ==
The company was founded in 1905 by Louis Delâge, who borrowed Fr 35,000, giving up a salary of F 600 a month to do so.

Its first location was on the Rue Cormeilles in Levallois-Perret. The company at first had just two lathes and three employees, one of them Peugeot's former chief designer. Delage initially produced parts for Helbé, with the De Dion-Bouton engine and chassis assembled by Helbé; Delage added only the body.

The first model was the Type A, a voiturette which appeared in 1906. It was powered by a one-cylinder De Dion-Bouton of 4.5 or 9 hp (3.4 or 6.7 kW; 4.6 or 9.1 PS). Like other early carmakers, Delage participated in motor racing, entering the Coupe de Voiturettes held at Rambouillet in November 1906 with a 9 hp (6.7 kW; 9.1 PS) racer. Seven days of regularity trials decided the entrants, and one of the two 9 metric horsepower (6.6 kW) Delage specials was wrecked in the rain on the fifth; nevertheless, Ménard, the other works driver, came second in the event, behind a Sizaire-Naudin.

In 1907, the factory moved to the Rue Baudin Levallois, where a 4,000 m^{2} (43,000 ft^{2}) workshop allowed it to grow. The two-cylinder Delages were no match for the competition this year at the Coupe des Voiturettes.

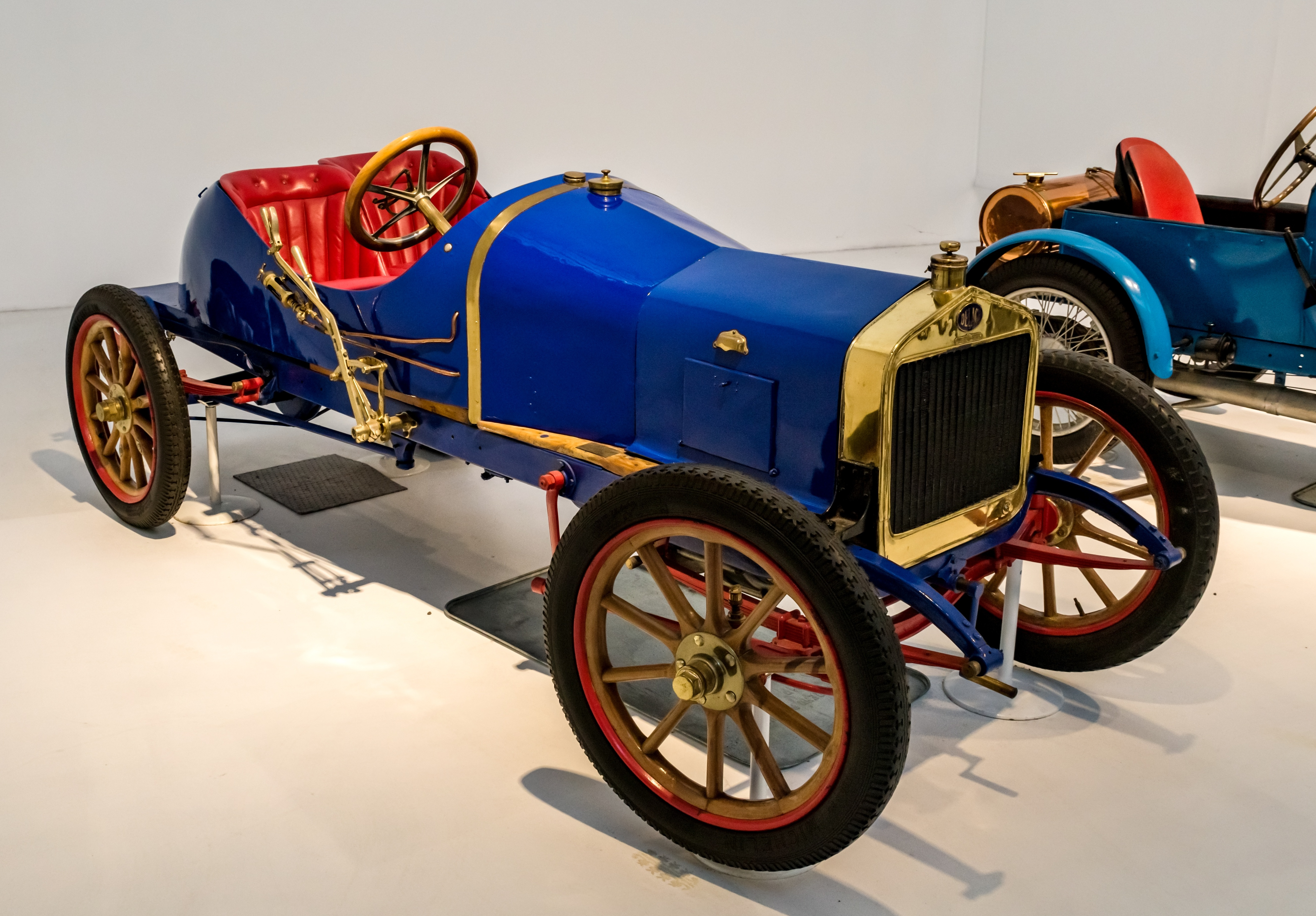
1908 Delage Type F believed to have raced at the 1908 Dieppe Grand Prix

In 1908, the success enabled the development of the factory and entry into more Grand Prix races. That year, racing success returned: Delage won the Grand Prix des Voiturettes held 6 July. This event, six laps of the 47.74 mi (76.83 km) Dieppe Grand Prix circuit, saw 47 starters. Delage fielded three cars: a pair with 1,242 cc (75.8 cu in) (78 by 130 mm (3.1 by 5.1 in)) De Dion-Bouton twins, driven by Thomas and Lucas-Bonnard, and a radical 28 hp (21 kW) 1,257 cc (76.7 cu in) (100 by 160 mm (3.9 by 6.3 in)) one-cylinder (built by Nemorin Causan) in the hands of Delage dealer Albert Guyot. Guyot won at an average 49.8 mph (80.1 km/h), not needing to stop for fuel. All three Delages finished this time, Thomas the quickest of the two-cylinder cars, while the team also took home the regularity prize. These good results contributed to total sales exceeding 300 cars for the year.

Delage converted to four-cylinder engines in 1909, at first provided by De Dion and Edouard Ballot; shortly, the company were producing their own sidevalve fours, too.

After an increase in sales, the existing facilities were too small, so in 1910 the factory moved to a new facility at 138 Boulevard de Verdun, Courbevoie. The following year saw the creation of advanced bodywork. By 1912, 350 workers were producing over 1000 cars annually, and offered four- and six-cylinder sidevalve engines.

During the First World War, Delage produced munitions. Production of passenger cars virtually stopped, with the exception of some fabrication for the Army. But the Delage factories were running full support for the war effort.

When the war concluded, Delage moved away from small cars and made its reputation with larger cars. First up was the CO, with a 4,524 cc (276.1 cu in) (80 by 150 mm (3.1 by 5.9 in)) fixed-head sidevalve six producing 20 hp. The CO plans had been drawn up during the conflict; this was the first passenger car with front brakes. It was joined by the DO with a 3-liter four.

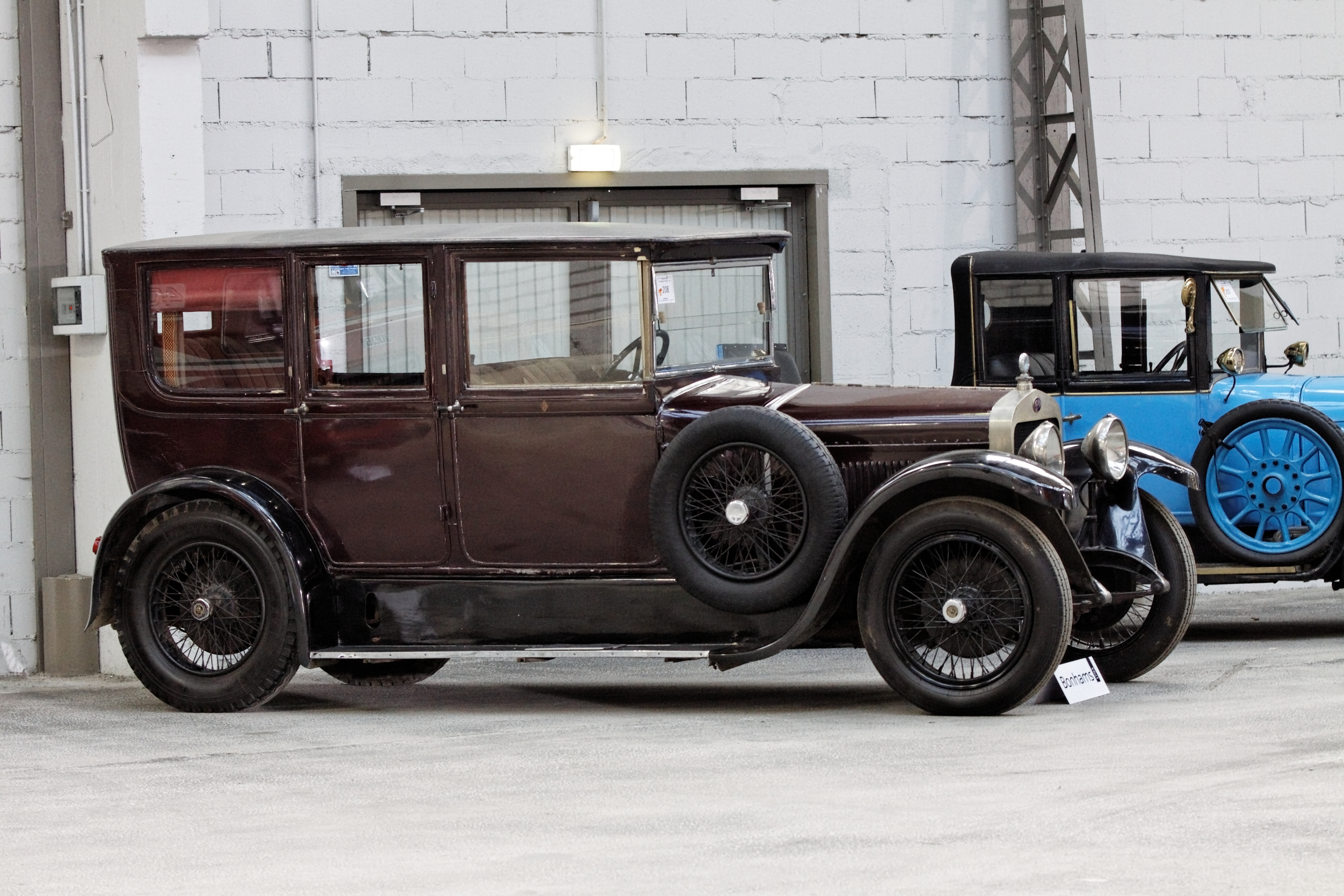
1926 Delage DI Saloon

The 1920s were really the first "Golden Age" of Delage. The most famous were the DE and DI: 4 cylinders of about 2 liters and 11 hp. Delage also attempted to compete with Hispano-Suiza, with the GL of 30 hp and 5954 cc, with some success. After that came a new generation of six-cylinder cars, like the MD (3174 cc) and DR (2516 cc), the best-selling vehicle in the history of the brand, designed by engineer Gaultier.

Both the CO and DO were replaced in 1922. The CO became the CO2, which changed to an overhead valve twin-plug head, producing 88 hp (66 kW; 89 PS), while the DO was supplanted by the DE with a 2,117 cc (129.2 cu in) (72 by 130 mm (2.8 by 5.1 in)) sidevalve four and, unusual in a production car even in this era, four-wheel brakes. The CO2 completed the Paris-Nice run in 16 hours, an average of 67 km/h (42 mph).

The next year, the new 14 hp (10 kW; 14 PS) DI also switched to OHV with a 2,121 cc (129.4 cu in) (75 by 120 mm (3.0 by 4.7 in)) four, fitted with magneto ignition and thermosyphon cooling; all had four-speed gearboxes and Zenith carburettors. At the other end of the scale, the GL (Grand Luxe), also known as the 40/50, replaced the CO2, being fitted with a magneto-fired 5,344 cc (326.1 cu in) (90 by 140 mm (3.5 by 5.5 in)) overhead cam six.

In 1923, a hillclimb car with DI chassis, larger wheels and tires, and 5,107 cc (311.6 cu in) (85 by 150 mm (3.3 by 5.9 in)) CO block (with three Zenith carburetors) was produced. Delage scored successes at La Turbie and Mont Ventoux. This car was joined by a 10,688 cc (652.2 cu in) (90 by 140 mm (3.5 by 5.5 in)) V12, which broke the course record at the Gaillon hillclimb, with Thomas at the wheel. Thomas would set the land speed record at Arpajon in this car, at a speed of 143.24 mph (230.52 km/h), in 1924. A 1925 car had a 5,954 cc (363.3 cu in) (95 by 140 mm (3.7 by 5.5 in)) six, again using the GL block, with four valves per cylinder and twin overhead cams. Driven by Divo, it broke the Mont Ventoux course record in its debut. The car was destroyed by fire at the Phoenix Park meet in 1934.

The 1924 and 1925 DIS, with a 117 in (3,000 mm) wheelbase, switched from Rolls-Royce-type locking wheel hubs to Rudge knock-ons, better cam, and bigger valves, while the 1925 and 1926 DISS on the same wheelbase. Some of the DISes were bodied by Kelsch. The DIS became the Series 6 in 1927, switching to coil ignition and water pump.

In 1926, Delage introduced the DM, with a 3,182 cc (194.2 cu in) (75 by 120 mm (3.0 by 4.7 in)) six, which made it emblematic of the era for the marque. The high-performance DMS had hotter cam, twin valve springs, and other improvements. A DR, with a choice of 2.2- and 2.5-liter sidevalve engines, also briefly appeared.

== Competition ==
Delage entered the 1911 Coupe de l'Auto at Boulogne with a 50 hp (37 kW) 2,996 cc (182.8 cu in) (80 by 149 mm (3.1 by 5.9 in)) four with two 60 mm (2.4 in)-diameter bellcrank-operated valves per cylinder controlled by camshafts in the crankcase. The five-speed gearbox gave a top speed of 60 mph (97 km/h), and the four voiturettes each carried 26 imp gal (120 L; 31 US gal), as the factory planned for a no-stop race. Works driver Paul Bablot won, at an average 55.2 mph (88.8 km/h), with a 1m 11s over Boillot's Peugeot, followed home by Thomas in a second Delage; Delage also took the team prize.

Delage moved up to Grand Prix racing in 1912, with a Léon Michelat-designed car powered by a four-valve 6,235 cc (380.5 cu in) (105 by 180 mm (4.1 by 7.1 in)) four-cylinder of 118 hp (87 kW), coupled again to a five-speed gearbox and fitted this time with 43 imp gal (200 L; 52 US gal). Three cars were built for the 569 mi (916 km) Amiens Grand Prix, though only two, Bablot's and Guyot's, actually entered. On the day, Bablot's Delage proved the fastest car in the field, turning in a lap at 76.6 mph (123.3 km/h), but Guyot fell out of the lead with a puncture, and the race went to Peugeot, while the Delages were fourth and fifth. At the French Grand Prix, Delage put Bablot first, Guyot second, ahead of Pilette's 1908 Mercedes GP car, Salzer in a Mercedes, with Duray coming in fifth in the third Delage.

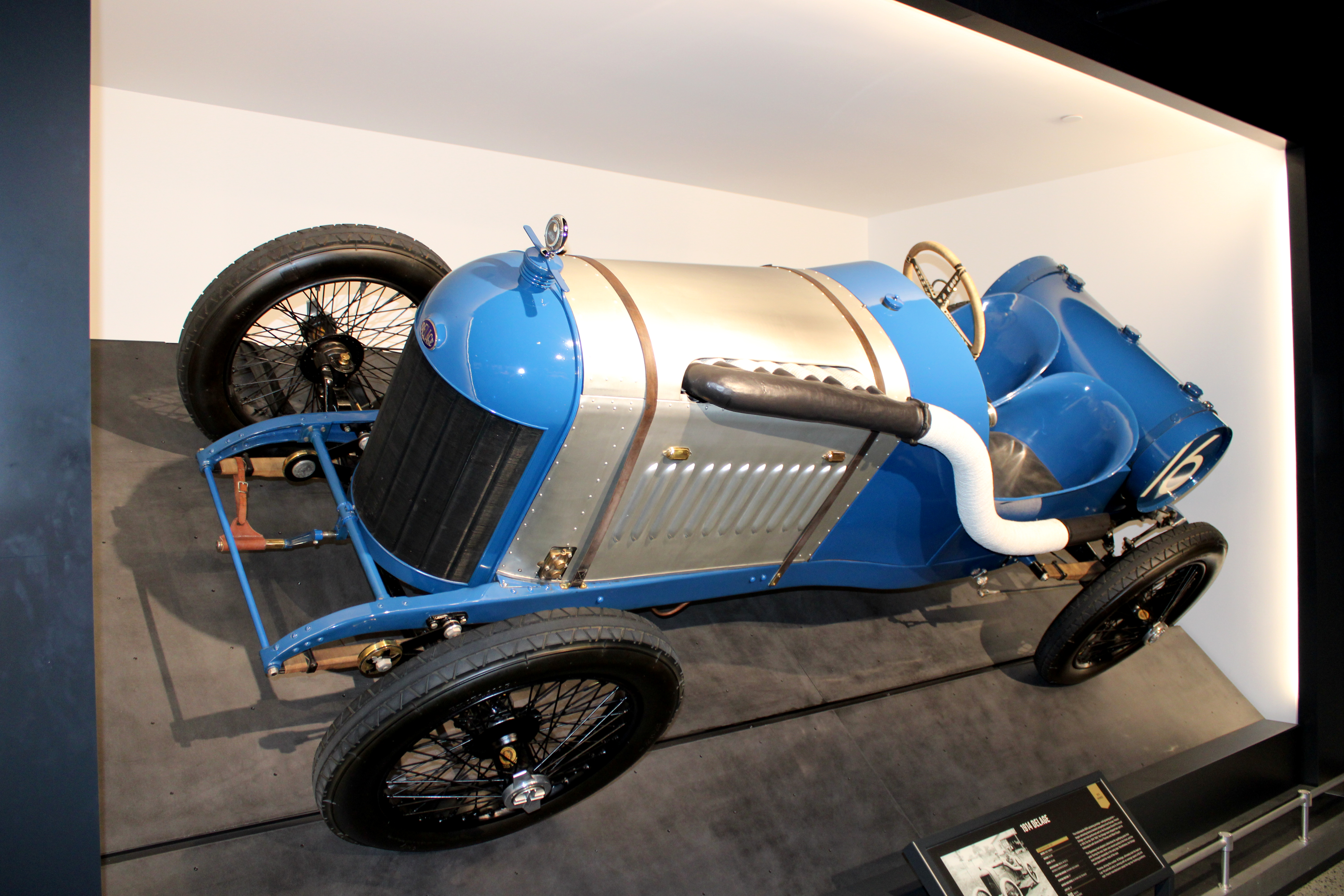
The Delage Type Y used by René Thomas to win the 1914 Indianapolis 500.

In 1913, the new type Y set the fastest lap time at the French Grand Prix at Le Mans, and in 1914, this same car won the 1914 Indianapolis 500 with René Thomas at the wheel. Thomas, Guyot, and Duray returned to the French Grand Prix with 4½-liter twin-cam desmodromic valved racers featuring twin carburettors, five-speed gearbox, and four-wheel brakes. While quick, they proved unreliable; only one finished, Duray's, in eighth.

In 1914, Delage emphasized its focus on competition by creating the type O Lyon Grand Prix, while at the same time moving towards the luxury car market with 6 cylinders of a large class. However, racing was severely curtailed during World War One.

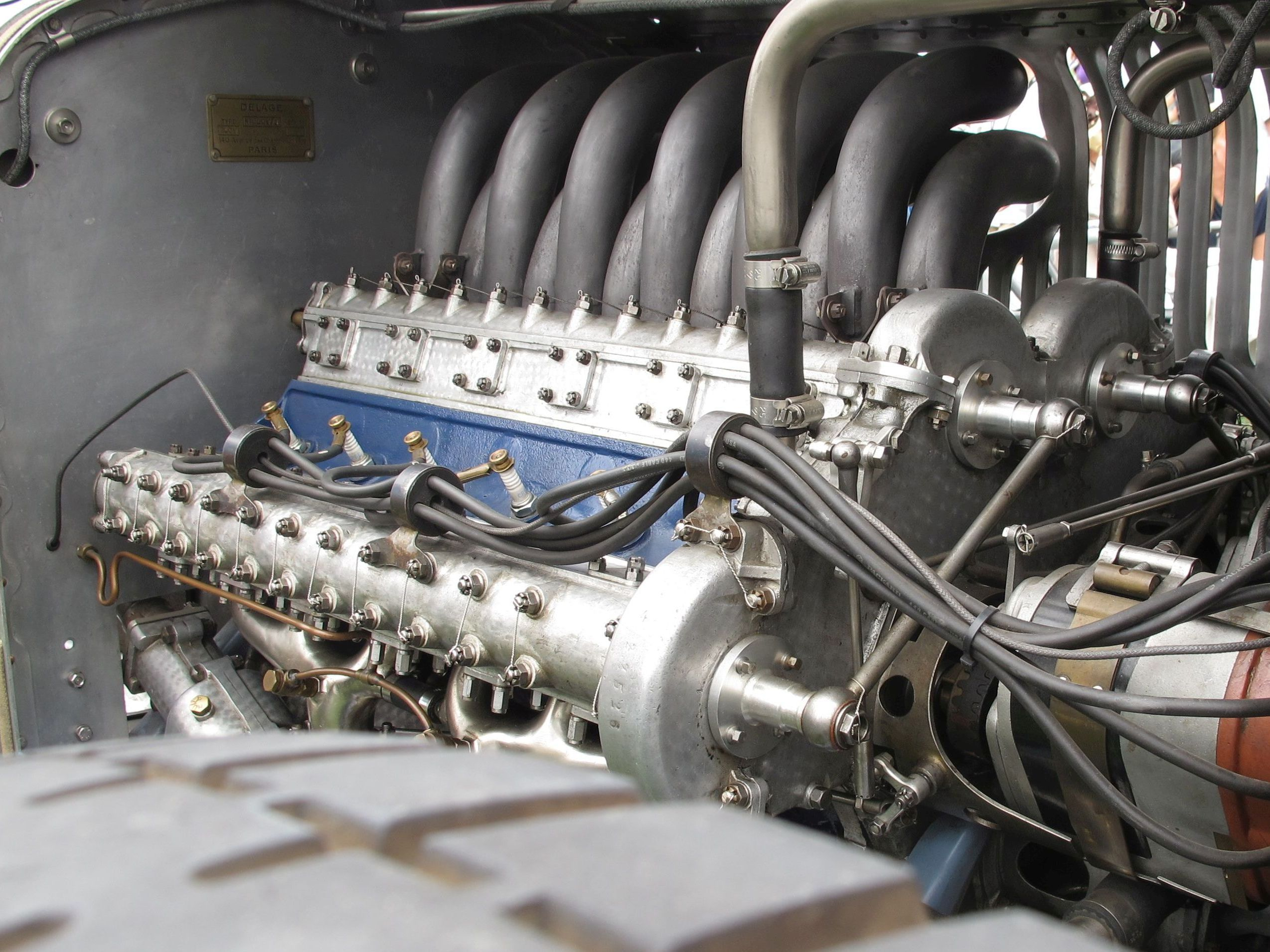
The V-12 engine in a 2 LCV. Note the exhaust on top, between the cylinder banks

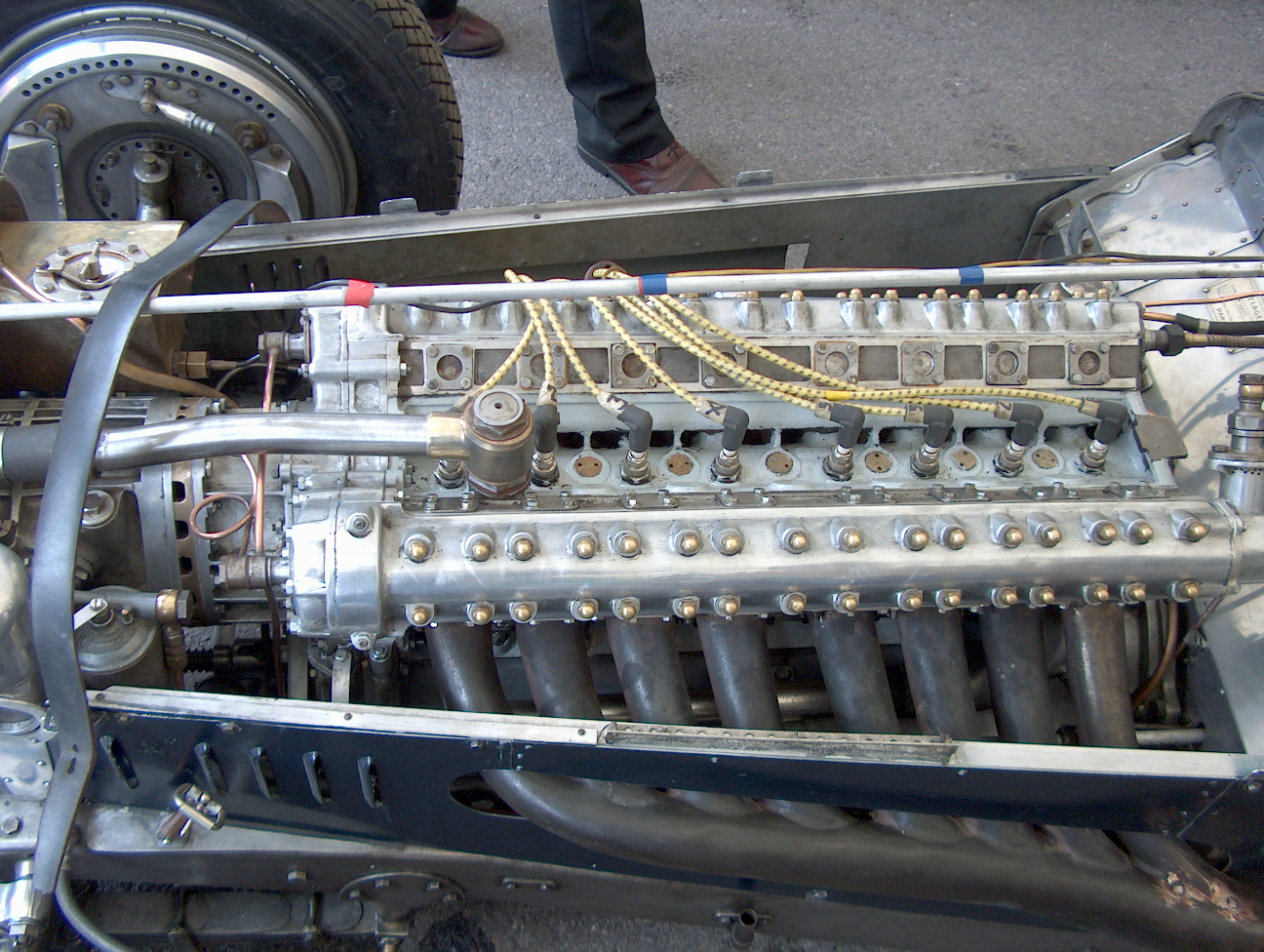
A Delage supercharged straight-8 racing engine

In 1923, Louis Delage returned to competition with the innovative 12-cylinder 2-liter type 2 LCV. This car won the 1924 European Grand Prix in Lyon and the 1925 Grand Prix of ACF Montlhéry. The 12-cylinder DH (10.5 liters) of 1924 beat the world speed record on the highway, at 230 km/h (143 mph). A Delage 155 B won the first Grand Prix of Great-Britain in 1926, driven by Louis Wagner and Robert Senechal. The production of cars continued with the DI and the DI S SS. The DM evolved into the DMS and DML, equipped with a 6-cylinder 3-liter engine designed by Maurice Gaultier.

Delage's Grand Prix effort saw a Plancton-designed 1,984 cc (121.1 cu in) (51.3 by 80 mm (2.02 by 3.15 in)) four overhead cam V12. The 110 hp (82 kW; 110 PS) car, driven by Thomas, fell out of the French Grand Prix in 1923, but went on to perform well for the bulk of the 1923 and 1924 season. With supercharger added in 1925, bringing output to 195 hp (145 kW; 198 PS), it won at Montlhéry and Lasarte, proving as fast as the Alfa Romeo P2, but rarely racing it directly.

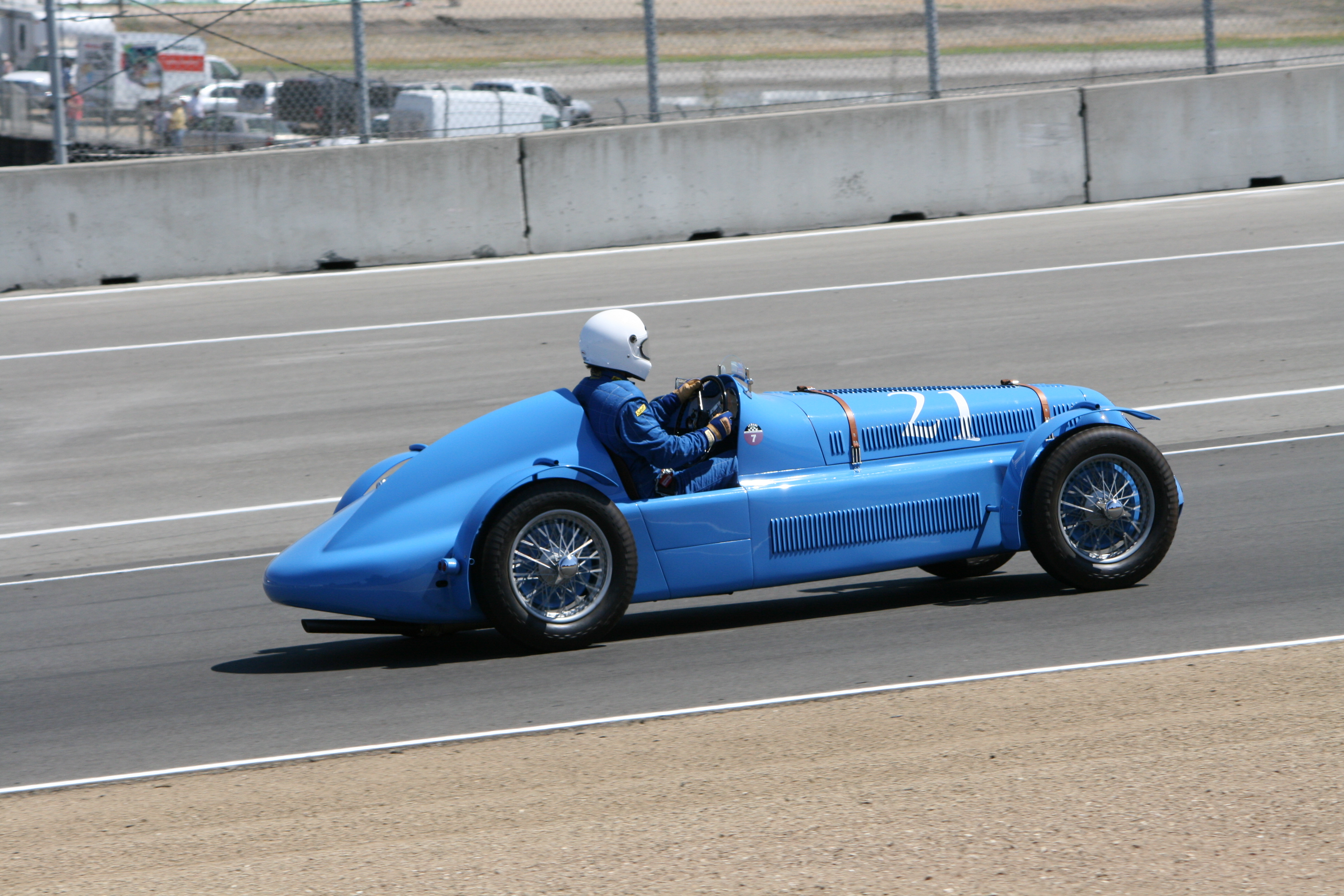
Delage D6

This car was supplanted in 1926 by a Lory-designed supercharged 1.5-liter twincam straight eight of 170 hp (125 kW); capable of 130 mph (210 km/h), it was the company's last Grand Prix entrant.

Always passionate about racing, Louis Delage designed an 8-cylinder 1500 cc, the type 15 S 8. This car won four European Grands Prix races in 1927, and won Delage the title "World Champion of Car Builders" that same year.

A 2,988 cc (182.3 cu in)-powered D6 won the 1938 Tourist Trophy at Donington Park and came second at Le Mans. A single V12-powered car, intended for Le Mans, caught fire at the 1938 International Trophy at Brooklands.

Postwar, the best results Delage had were seconds at the 1949 Le Mans and 1950 Paris Grand Prix.

== The D6 and the D8: The Classic Era ==
1930 saw the launch of the 6-cylinder Delage D6 which would form the mainstay of the manufacturer's passenger car range until 1954.

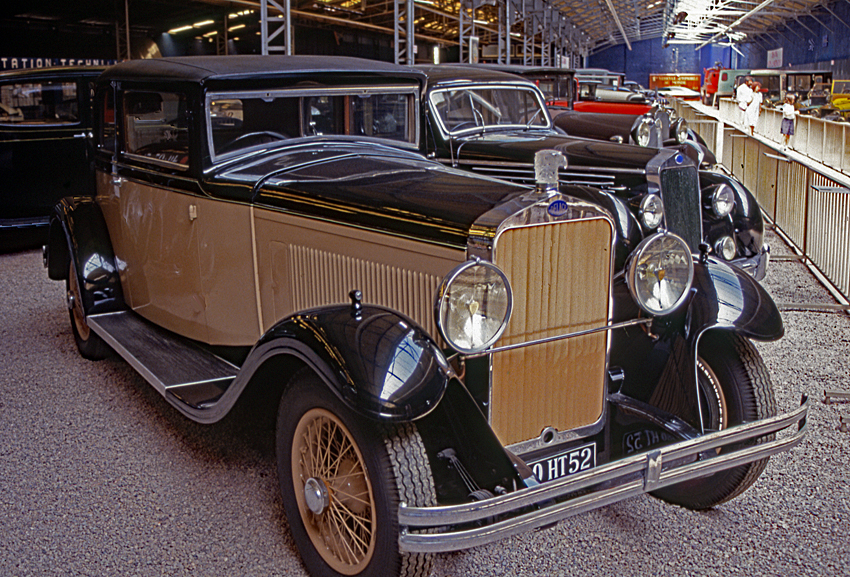
1930 Delage D8c with Lalique mascot

For 1930 Maurice Gaultier designed an 8-cylinder in-line 4,061 cc, evolving the type D8 into the type D8 S (S for Sport).

The D8 was the pinnacle of the marque. It was offered in three wheelbases, "S" or "C" at 130 in (3,300 mm), "N" at 140 in (3,600 mm), and "L" at 143 in (3,600 mm), all powered by a 4,061 cc (247.8 cu in) (77 by 109 mm (3.0 by 4.3 in)) straight eight, making it capable of 85 mph (137 km/h). Delage followed in 1932 with the Grand Sport, on a 123 in (3,100 mm) 130 in (3,300 mm) in 1934) wheelbase, capable of 100 mph (160 km/h).

But the backlash of the economic crisis of 1929 arrived and manufacturers of luxury cars all over the world suffered from poor sales. The commercial and financial situation of the firm was badly shaken. In 1932 Delage introduced the type D6-11 (6-cylinder 2101 cc), and two years later the new eight-cylinder Delage, type D8-15 (2768 cc). These two models, equipped with independent front wheel suspension did not increase sale figures. The transverse leaf and wishbone independent front suspension was licensed by Studebaker for their cars. Delage also produced a very limited number of higher-performance D6-11S models during 1933 and 1934. These "S" models ("S" being an abbreviation for Surbaisse, which means "lowered" in French) were built on a lowered and shorter chassis.

The junior D6s shared Delahaye front suspension design, but had hydraulic rather than Delahaye cable-actuated brakes, also shared the Cotal gearbox with the D8. The D6/70 of 1936 was powered by a 2,729 cc (166.5 cu in) (80 by 90.5 mm (3.15 by 3.56 in)) six, the 1938 D6/75 a 2.8-liter six, and the postwar D8/3L Olympic a 3-liter six. At the bottom of the range was a 1.5-liter four that lasted until 1936.

Financial pressures never disappeared, however, and during the spring of 1932 Louis Delage was obliged to take out a 25 Million franc loan in order to finance the tooling needed to put the D6 into production. It was at this time that he also entered into negotiations with Peugeot about using their dealership and service network. These negotiations went nowhere, and discussions with other possible partners/rescuers also came to nothing. There were also personal problems involving his marriage which necessitated a rearrangement of Delage's personal finances, although in the event it was the sale of his expensive home in the Champs-Élysées that reduced the pressure on his finances if only in the short term.

The last models to emerge from the factory in Courbevoie were the types D6-65, D8-85 and D8-105, designed by engineer Michelat. On 20 April 1935 the factory in Courbevoie went into voluntary liquidation.

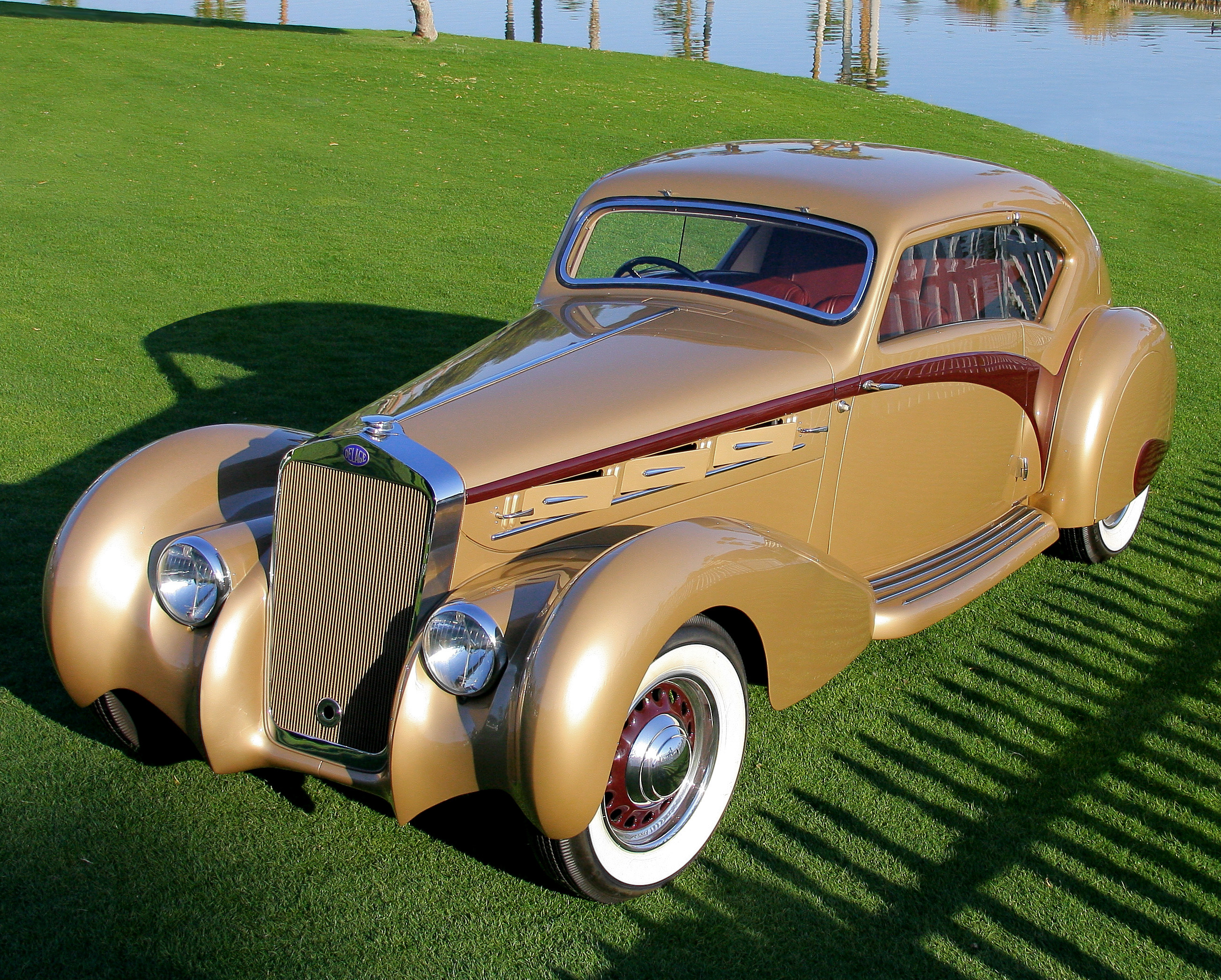
1937 Delage D8 120 Coupe Aerosport by Letourneur et Marchand

But Louis Delage would not admit defeat, and with the help of a businessman called Walter Watney created the Société Nouvelle des Automobiles Delage (SAFAD), to market Delage cars, assembled from production Delahayes. This union created the 4-cylinder DI 12 and the D8 120, and also the 6-cylinder D6 70. Watney had taken control as president of SAFAD, but he was a British national and in June 1940 he was obliged to leave Paris as the German Army arrived. Watney stayed in France, at his villa in Beaulieu, until the end of 1942 after the Germans had completed their occupation, but already in December 1940 the presidency of the SAFAD business had passed directly into the control of Delahaye. In any event, since the outbreak of the war Delage had been largely inactive, although they did undertake work on a project to replace the six-cylinder engine of the Hotchkiss H39 tank with the more powerful 8-cylinder unit from the Delage D8 120.

== Racing aero-engines ==
Delage produced at least two types of racing aero-engine during the early 1930s. The Delage 12 CED was fitted to the Kellner-Béchereau 28VD racing aircraft, intended to compete in the 1933 Coupe Deutsch de la Meurthe air race. Unfortunately the aircraft crashed during qualification trials for the race on 12 May 1933. The second engine type, the Delage 12 GV, remains a mystery, with very little information available.

== After the Second World War ==
A large prototype Delage D-180 limousine appeared at the 1946 Paris Motor Show, but there were evidently no further developments on this project, and by the next year the big prototype had quietly disappeared. At the 1947 Paris Motor Show only a single model was exhibited as the business focused on its six-cylinder 3-litre Delage D6 which in most respects will have been familiar to anyone who had known the 3-litre Delages of the 1930s. The car was offered with bodies by firms such as Chapron, Letourner & Marchand and Guilloré. A variety of coupe and cabriolet bodied D6s were produced. In addition, both Guilloré and Chapron produced a large saloon/sedan body. The two were remarkably similar, both being six-light four-door cars with conservative 1930s style shapes. Something else the two had in common was unexpectedly narrow rear doors, enforced by the combination of a long body, a long rear overhang and a relatively short wheelbase provided by the D6 chassis. A longer wheelbase 1952 special version, bodied by Guilloré, was owned by National Assembly president Édouard Herriot.

Nevertheless, these were difficult times for luxury auto-makers in France and by now the company's registered head office was the same as that for Delahaye: production statistics from the period group Delage and Delahaye together. Louis Delâge himself, who had lived in poverty and quasi-monastic isolation since bankruptcy in 1935 had enforced the transfer of his company to Delahaye, died in December 1947, and during the next few years any residual autonomy that the business had enjoyed disappeared. Increases in motoring taxes, most notably in 1948 and most savagely targeting cars with engines of above 2 litres, combined with the depressed economic conditions of post-war France to create a difficult market for luxury car manufacturers. In 1950 Delahaye produced 235 cars which will have included a significant number of Delages. In 1951 the combined production figure for the two brands slumped to 77: in 1952 it was down to 41. In 1953 Delage production ended.

Delage was absorbed into Hotchkiss along with Delahaye in 1954, and car manufacturing ended.

=== Refoundation ===
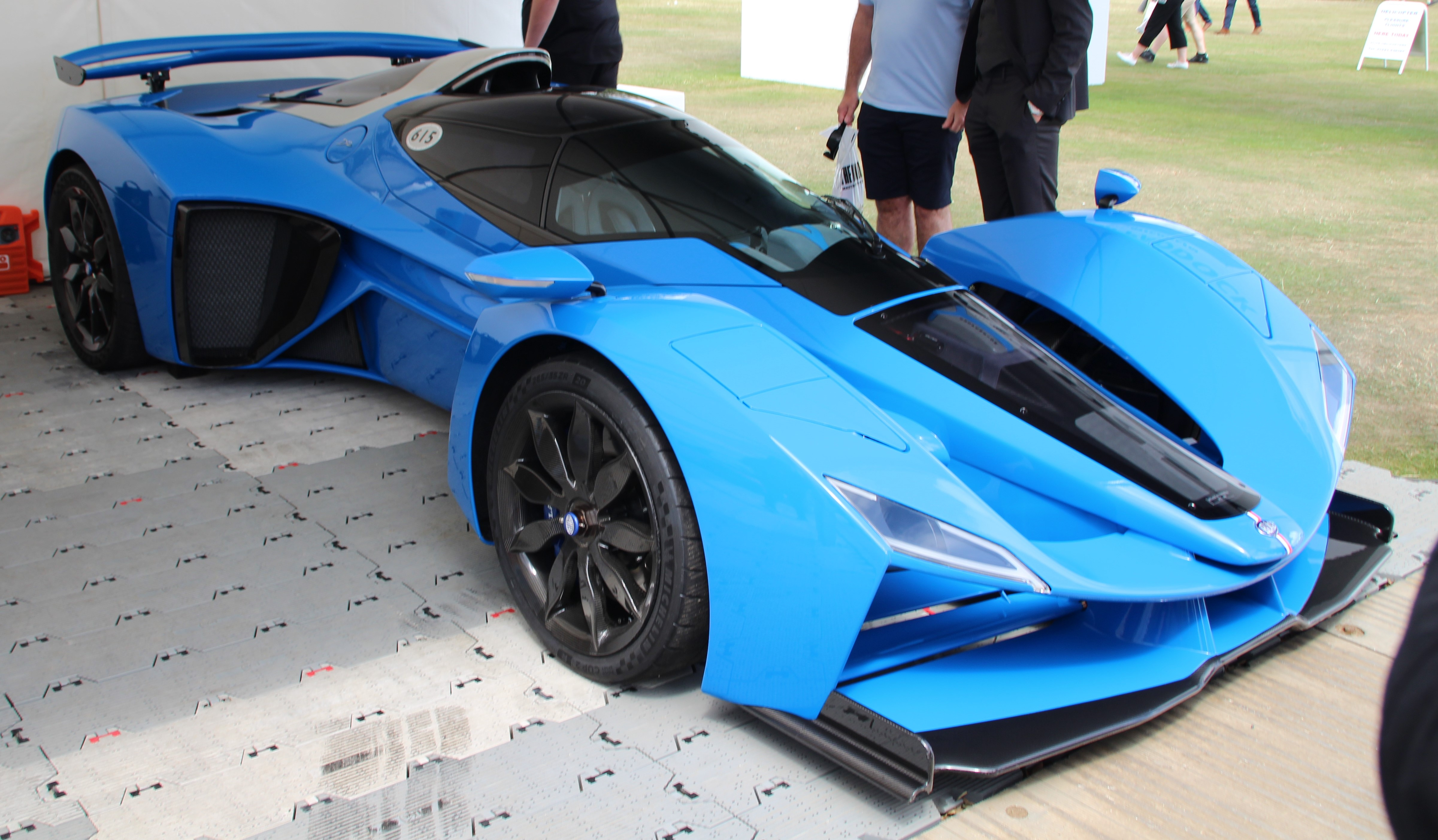
The running prototype of the D12 (2022)

On 7 November 2019, at the Lyon Époqu'auto show, Les Amis de Delage and entrepreneur Laurent Tapie, son of Bernard Tapie, announced that they had signed an agreement for relaunch the Delage Automobiles brand. Tapie becomes president of Delage Automobiles. The new Delage planned for this project is called the Delage D12. It is a hybrid street-legal sports car powered by a normally aspirated V12 engine of 990 hp (728 kW), coupled to an electric motor of 110 hp (81 kW), for a cumulative power of 1,100 hp (809 kW). It will be produced in France like all Delages. Delage Automobiles has joined forces with racing driver Jacques Villeneuve as the development driver for the future production model. The car was presented at private events in Los Angeles and Orange County in California in December 2019, then in Monaco in September 2020, Geneva in November 2020 and Dubai in December 2020.

Voted "most beautiful car in the world" (best Design) by the jury of the Automobile Awards 2020/2021, only 30 units of the Delage D12 will be produced and sold at a price tag of over 2 million Euros per car as of 2026. As per Tapie, three units had been delivered to their owners by mid-2026 and the company was working on developing a second model, called the Torpille 100A.

== Models ==
- Delage CO (1918, 6 cyl, 4,524 cc)
- Delage DI (1920, 2,121 cc)
- Delage CO2 (1921)
- Delage 2 LCV (1923, 12 cyl, 2L)
- Delage GL (5,954 cc)
- Delage DE
- Delage DH (12 cyl DH, 10,5L)
- Delage DI S
- Delage DI SS
- Delage DMS (6 cyl, 3L)
- Delage DML (6 cyl, 3L)
- Delage 15 S 8 (8 cyl, 1,500 cc)
- Delage GL (5,954 cc)
- Delage DM (6 cyl, 3,174 cc)
- Delage DR (6 cyl, 2,170 cc) or (6 cyl, 2,517 cc)
- Delage D4 (4 cyl, 1,480 cc)
- Delage D6-11 (6 cyl, 2,101 cc)
- Delage D8-15 (2,768 cc)
- Delage D6-65
- Delage D8-85
- Delage D8
- Delage D8 S (8 cyl, 4,061 cc)
- Delage D8-105
- Delage DI 12 (4 cyl)
- Delage D8 120
- Delage D6 70 (6 cyl)
- Delage D12 – 2021 (12 cyl, 7,604 cc + 110 hp motor)

== Production volumes ==
During their years of independence, Delage made almost 40,000 cars at their workshops in Levallois and Courbevoie. After Delage production was subsumed into the Delahaye operation, approximately another 2,000 Delage badged cars were manufactured between 1935 and 1940. With the post-war resumption of passenger car production, 330 Delage cars appear to have been produced by Delahaye between 1946 and 1953.

== Sources and further reading ==
- Hull, Peter (1974). "Delage: Speed and Elegance in the French Tradition". In Ward, Ian (ed.). World of Automobiles. Vol. 5. London: Orbis. pp. 517–520.
