= Laurent Tapie =

French businessman (born 1974)

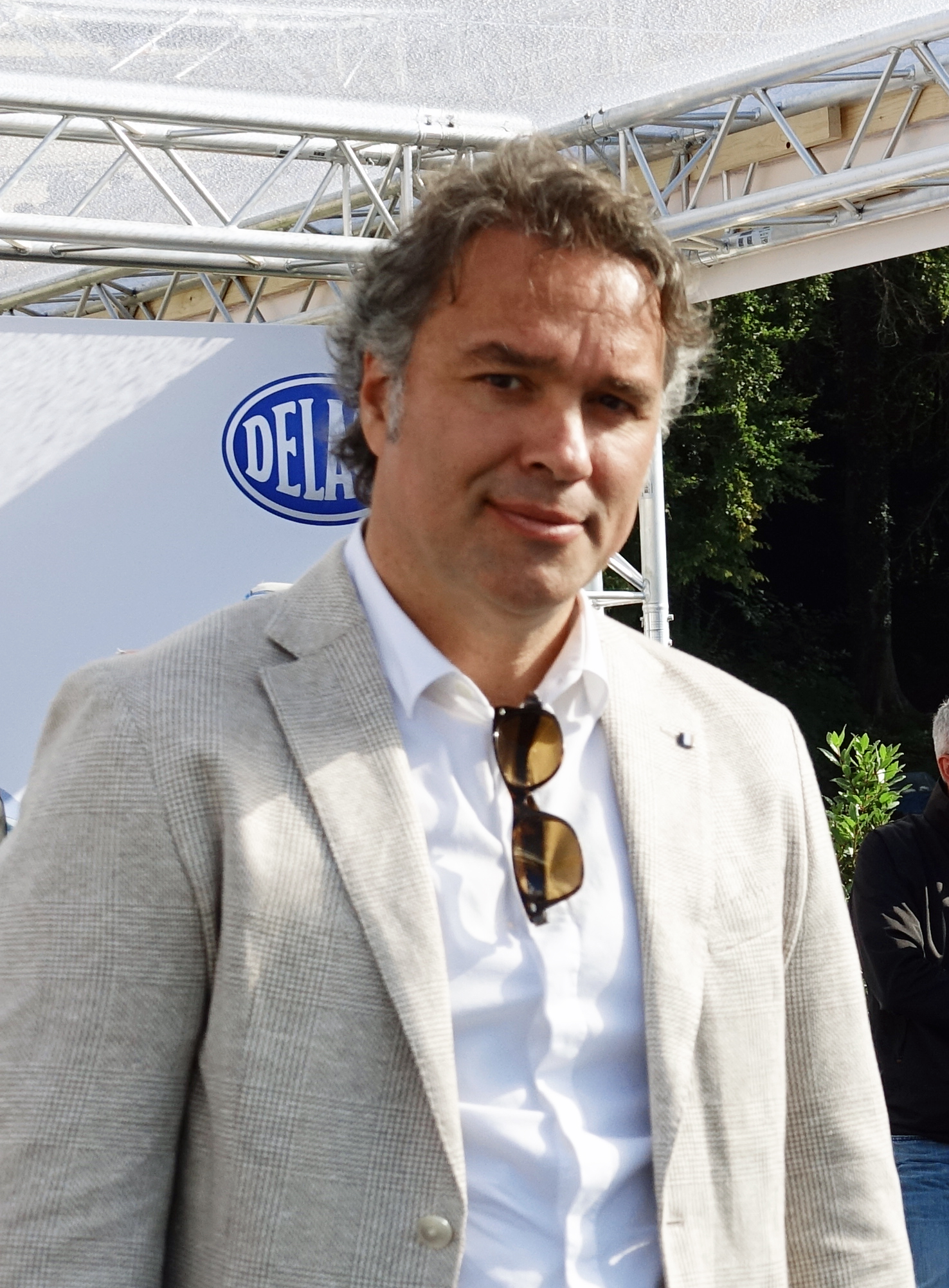
- Born: 7 October 1974 (age 52)
- Citizenship: French
- Education: ESCP Business School (until 1998)
- Occupation: Businessman
- Employer: Falcon Automotive
- Organization: Delage (since 2019)
- Parents: Bernard Tapie (father); Dominique Tapie (née Mialet-Damianos) (mother)
- Relatives: Stéphane Tapie (brother); Nathalie Tapie (sister); Sophie Tapie (sister)

Laurent Tapie (born 7 October 1974) is a French businessman, owner of the rights to the Delage car brand since 2019.

== Biography ==
=== Childhood and education ===
Laurent Tapie was born on 7 October 1974. He is the son of businessman Bernard Tapie and Dominique Mialet-Damianos.

In 1998, he obtained a business degree from the École supérieure de commerce de Paris (ESCP).

=== Entrepreneurship ===
Tapie is the creator of two websites, free-goal.com and livebetting.com, which he sold in 2008 to the Partouche Group, where he then became the director of the digital subsidiary Partouche Interactive.

In 2009, he founded BLT Développement (Bernard Laurent Tapie) and created the online commerce website bernardtapie.com.

=== Automobile ===
On 7 November 2019, at the Époqu'auto show in Lyon, Tapie and "Les Amis de Delage" announced that they had signed an agreement for the transfer of the rights to the defunct Delage automobile manufacturer, of which he became the president.

On 10 December 2019 in Los Angeles, he presented a concept for the Delage D12,a future hybrid supercar.

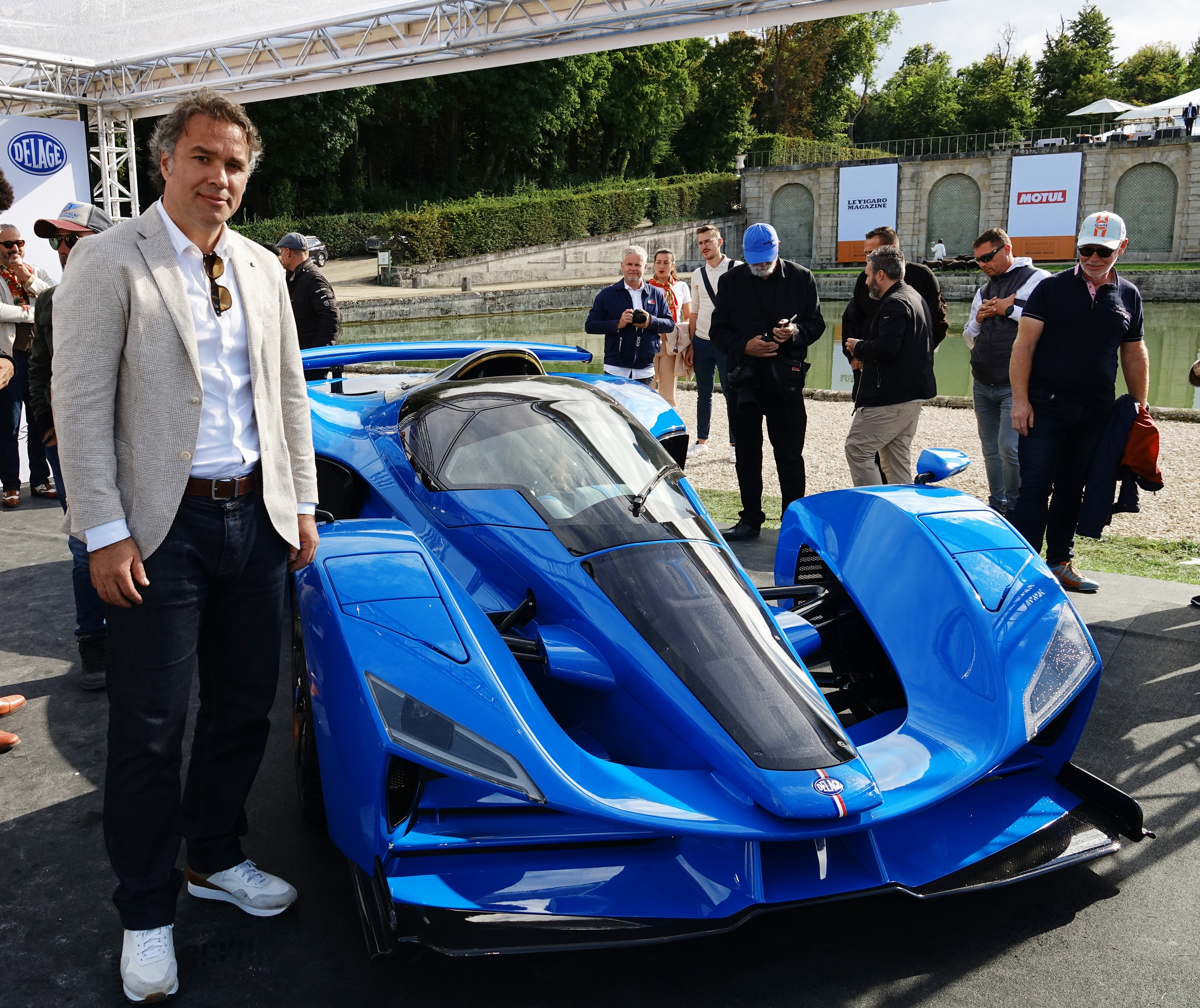
Laurent Tapie and the Delage D12
