= Leon Paulet =

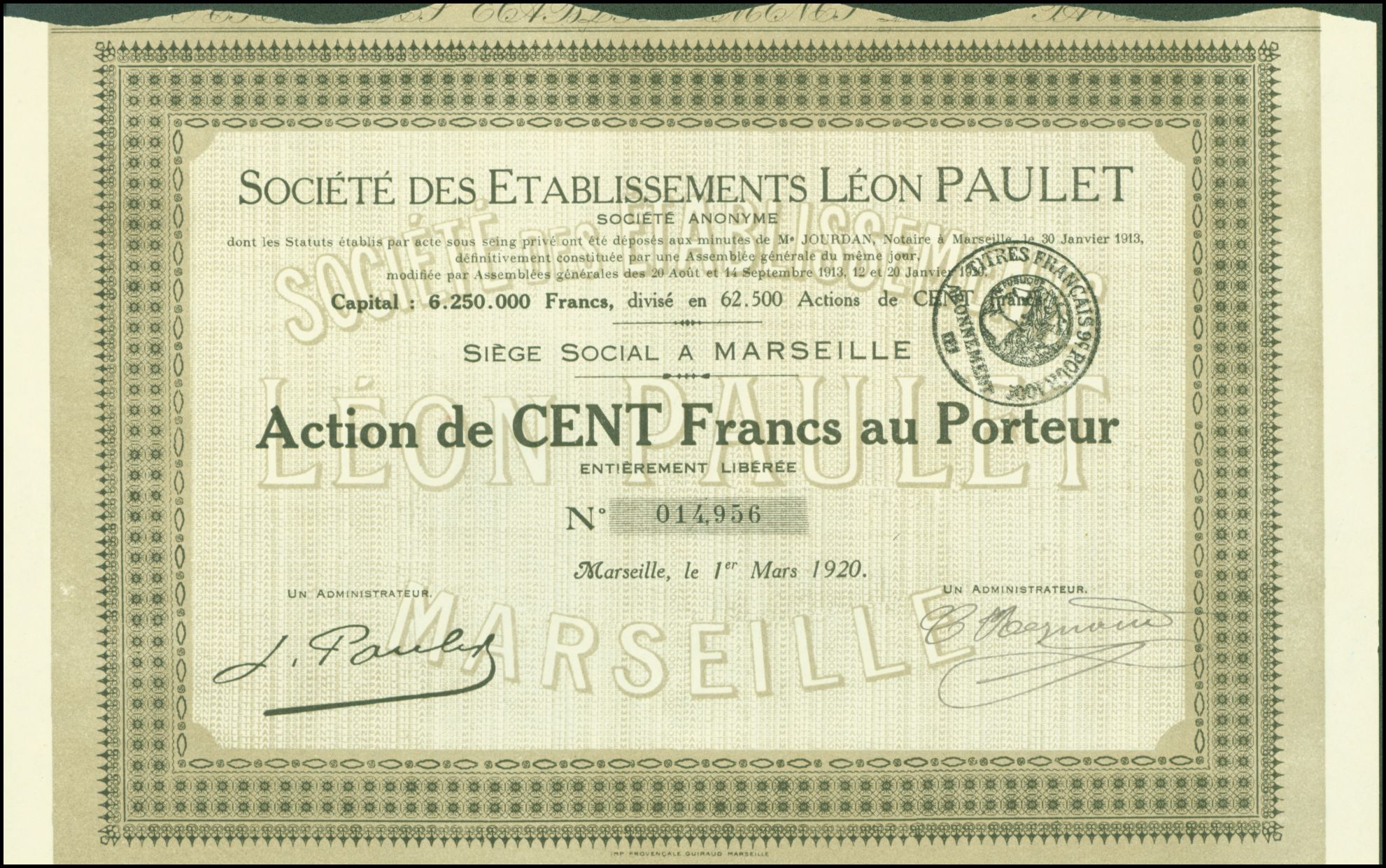
Share of the Société des Établissements Léon Paulet SA, issued 1. March 1920

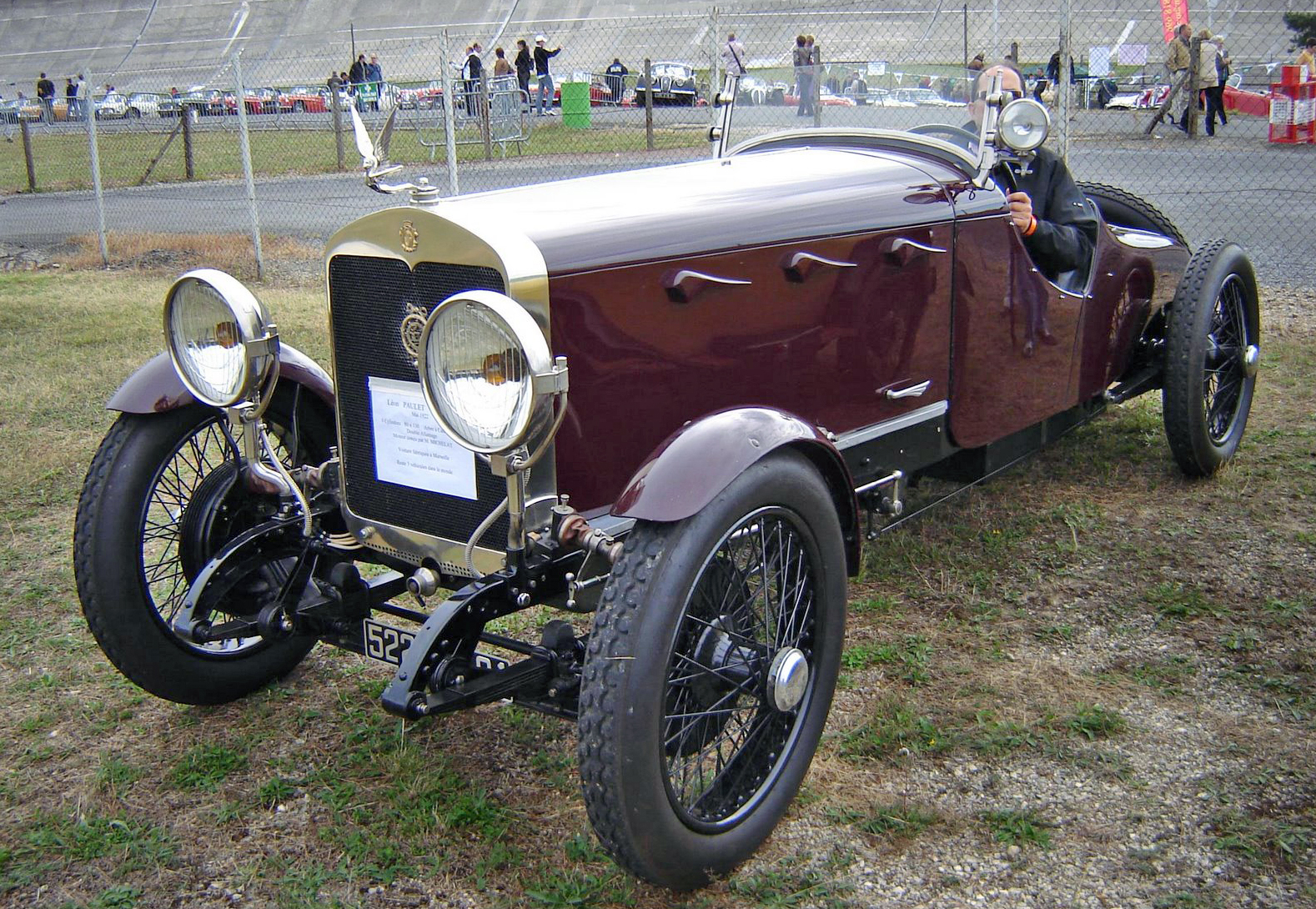
1922 (Léon) Paulet type 6 AB at the Autodrome de Linas-Montlhéry, 2009

The Léon Paulet was an automobile manufactured in Marseille, France, between 1922 and 1925. The Type 6AB used a seven-bearing overhead camshaft 3.4 litre engine, designed by former Delage engineer Arthur Michelat.

The engine had a more than passing resemblance to the Hispano-Suiza, and they took Léon Paulet to court. Paulet was ordered to cease production of the Michelat designed engine. Rather than try to find another engine, Paulet ended production after approximately 20 cars had been built.
