= Louis Delâge =

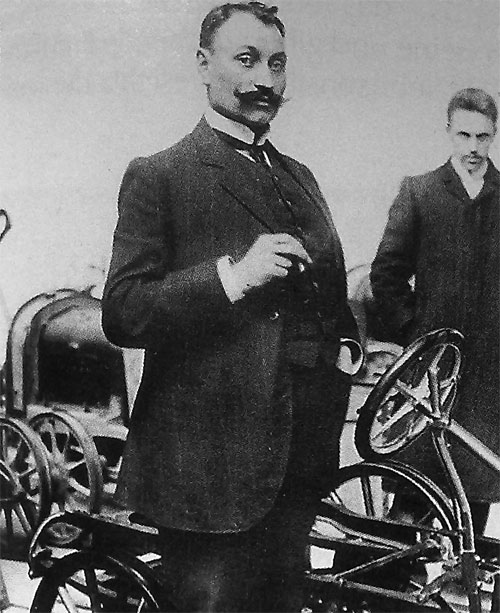
Louis Delâge

Louis Delâge (22 March 1874 – 14 December 1947) was a French pioneer automotive engineer and manufacturer.

Born Pierre Louis Delâge to a family of modest means in Cognac. As an infant he lost the sight in one eye. At the age of 16 he went to study at Arts et Métiers ParisTech in Angers, graduating with an engineering degree in 1893. Delage then fulfilled his military obligation and was stationed in Algeria. Discharged in 1895, he found work with a railway company in southern France; in 1900 he moved to Paris. There he worked in the engineering and design department of a motor vehicle manufacturing concern until 1903 when he received an offer to join the fledgling Renault automobile company.

Delâge realized the enormous potential for the automobile as demand soon began to outstrip production. Filled with innovative ideas, in 1905 he raised enough money to open an assembly plant in a converted barn in Levallois at the outskirts of Paris. The Delage Automobile Company grew rapidly and their vehicles gained a reputation for stylish appearance and quality and as a dominant force in motor racing. The Great Depression of the 1930s took its toll and car sales plummeted. By 1935 his company was forced into liquidation, and the rights to the Delage name were auctioned to the Delahaye car company. The new owners unceremoniously dismissed Delâge with a penurious pension.

Louis Delâge was nearly 60 when he found himself in a financial crisis worsened by his divorce. He sought solace in his Roman Catholic faith, and because he was too poor to afford a car, he often made the pilgrimage on foot or by bicycle to the sacred convent of Saint Thérèse in the city of Lisieux and to the Sanctuary of Our Lady of Lourdes. In 1947, at the age of 73 and nearly impoverished, Louis Delâge died. He is interred in the cemetery in Le Pecq.

In 1990, in his hometown of Cognac, an industrial school was dedicated as the "Lycée professionnel Louis Delâge" in his memory.
