= Delage 12C.E.D.irs =

12 CEDirs
- Type: Inverted 60° V-12 water-cooled supercharged piston engine
- National origin: France
- Manufacturer: Delage
- First run: ~ 1933
- Major applications: Kellner-Béchereau 28VD

The Delage 12 CEDirs was a French racing aero-engine designed and built especially to power the Kellner-Béchereau 28VD for racing in the 1933 Coupe Deutsch de la Meurthe air races.

== Design and development ==
The 12 CEDirs was an inverted 60° V-12 water-cooled engine with reduction gearing and two Roots blower superchargers.

== Operational history ==
The 12 CEDirs was flown for the first time, in the 28VD, on 12 May 1933. Problems with propeller speed dogged the initial flights and are blamed for the crash of the 28VD on 14 May 1933. The propeller was over-speeding to a high degree, causing a cooling system rupture. With steam obscuring his view the pilot force-landed the 28 VD with nil visibility, destroying the aircraft but not causing serious injury to the pilot.

== Applications ==
- Kellner-Béchereau 28VD

== Specifications (12 CEDirs) ==
Data from

=== General characteristics ===
- Type: Inverted 60° V-12 piston engine
- Bore: 100 mm (3.94 in)
- Stroke: 84 mm (3.31 in)
- Displacement: 7.917 L (483.12 cu in)
- Dry weight: 350 kg (770 lb)

=== Components ===
- Valvetrain: pushrod operated via rockers, with valve return by springs operating on reduction levers rather than on the valves directly (Delage Patent)
- Supercharger: dual Roots blowers, one for each bank of cylinders
- Fuel system: carburettor
- Reduction gear: 0.487:1 through two super-posed reduction gears

=== Performance ===
- Power output: achieved:280 kW (370 hp) at 3,900 rpm

expected:310 kW (420 hp)

- Compression ratio: 5.2:1
