= Helbé =

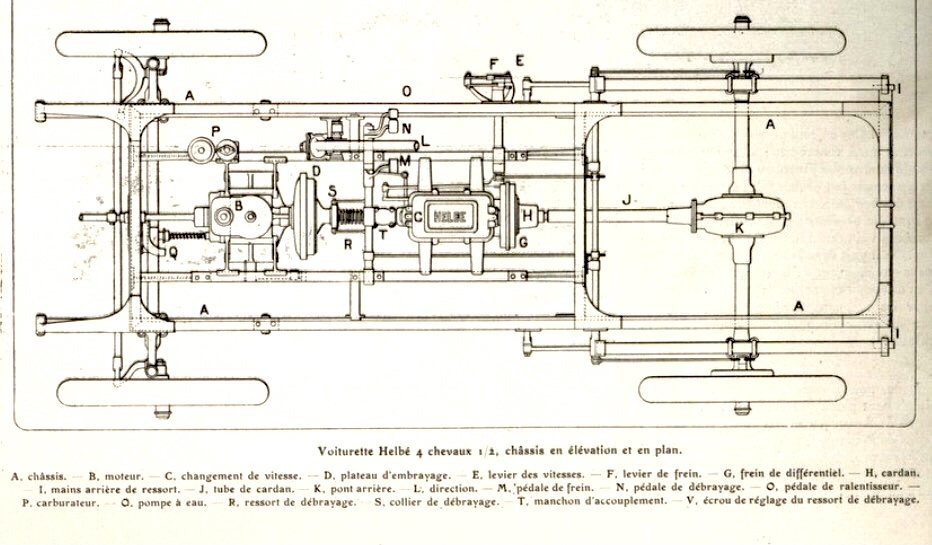
Helbé Chassis

The Helbé was a French automobile manufactured from 1905 until 1907. Its name was derived from "LB", the initials of its builder Levêcque and Bodenreider. It was an assembled light car, powered by De Dion engines of 4 1/2, 6, and 8 hp, and used Delage components.
