= Delage D4 =

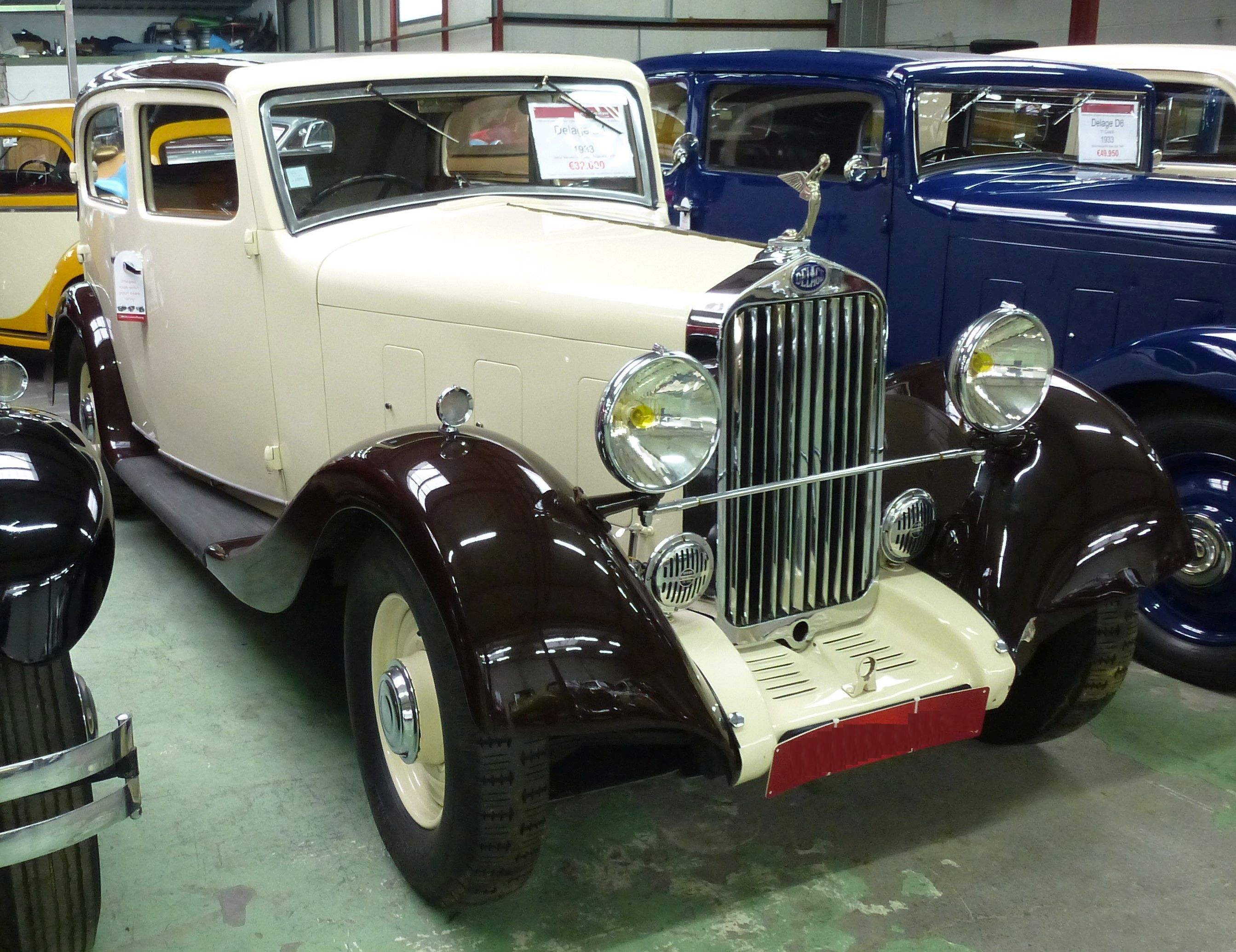

Overview
- Manufacturer: Delage
- Production: 1933–1934

Body and chassis
- Body style: "Coach standard" 2-doors/4-seats "Berline" (saloon/sedan) 4-doors/4-seats "Coupé" 2/3 seats "Coach luxe" 2-doors/4-seats "Torpédo roadster" (cabriolet) 2-seats "Cabriolet décapotable" 2-doors/4-seats Also offered in bare chassis form

Powertrain
- Engine: 1480 cc 4-cylinder ohv
- Transmission: Four-speed manual

Dimensions
- Wheelbase: 2,800 mm (110 in)

The Delage D4 was a 4-cylinder compact luxury car in the 8CV car tax band produced by the manufacturer between 1933 and 1934.

== The car ==
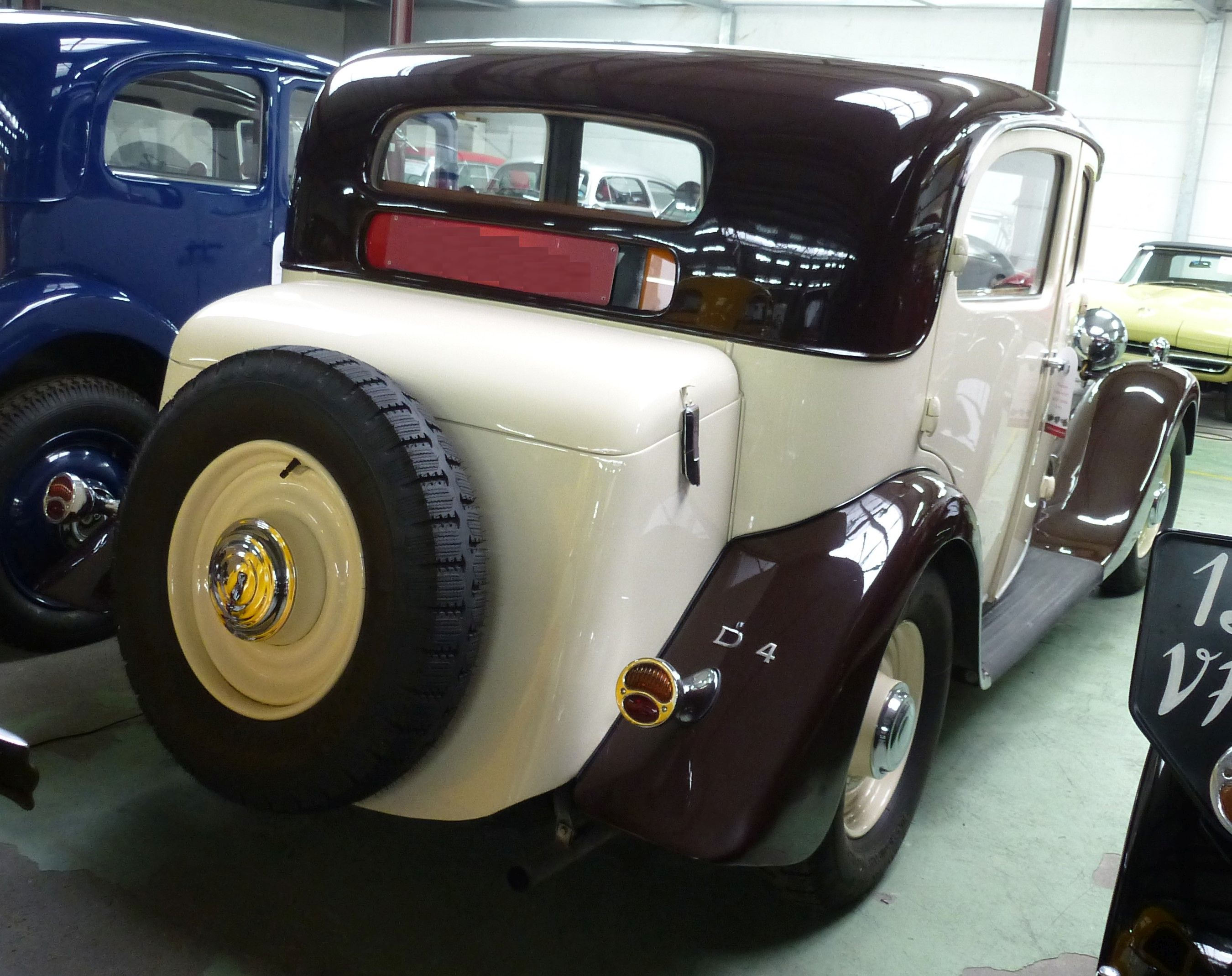
1933 Delage D4 rear

With the D4, the manufacturer returned to a market sector that it had neglected ever since ending production of the "Type AM" in 1921. A strategy of broadening the range downwards was understandable in the context of a French car market that failed to rebound from the economic depression like Britain and Germany. (French automobile production only returned to its 1928 level in 1938.

Launched in October 1933 at the 27th Paris Motor Show, the D4 was positioned at the lower end of the Delage range, below the 2-litre D6-11 which had been introduced the previous year, initially to complement and then replace the manufacturer's DS. The D4 was, therefore, part of a broader change in focus by Delage away from the larger cars, reflecting a more general switch towards middle-class cars in the overall French auto-market during the first five or so years of the 1930s.

The D4 sat on a 2,800 mm (110 in) wheelbase, and was designed to incorporate the maximum possible level of component commonality with other Delage models. It was nevertheless fitted with the manufacturer's only four cylinder engine, an overhead valve unit of 1480 cc (8CV). The maximum listed output was 40 hp (30 kW), produced at 4,200 rpm. Performance would have varied according to the body type selected and driving conditions, but a value of "approximately 100 km/h (63 mph)" was quoted.

The car could be ordered in bare chassis form, permitting customers to make their own arrangements with bespoke coach builders for clothing the chassis. That reflected normal practice among more traditional auto-makers, especially in respect of larger cars. Nevertheless, the catalogue given out at the Motor Show listed six "standard" body types from which customers could also choose. These included 2-door and 4-door saloon/sedan bodies as well as a coupe, a four-seater cabriolet and a two-seater "roadster" style cabriolet.

== Commercial ==
The arrival of the D4 coincided with a renewed interest in the 8CV (8HP) class by what were already becoming France's "Big-3" automakers, with the introduction for 1934 of the new "all-steel" bodied versions of the Peugeot 301 and Renault Monaquatre YN3. "All-steel" car bodies were transforming the economics of automobile manufacturing, polarizing the market between automakers with access to the funds necessary to invest in heavy steel presses and dies and second tier automakers. Once the capital cost of the steel presses had been found, the unit cost of production was much lower with "all-steel" bodied cars than with the traditional labour-intensive timber frame car bodies, but the economics only worked where the volume of cars produced was sufficient to cover the initial capital cost.

Delage did not have the dealer/service network across France necessary for a volume automaker, and it is unlikely that the production processes for the D4 were as cost-effective as those for its competitors in the now hotly contested 8CV class. In price terms the Delage found itself undercut by Peugeot, Citroën and Renault. Its larger cylinder diameter and the overhead valves for which that gave space gives credibility to the higher listed power output figure which implied a performance advantage, but even allowing for the somewhat approximate nature of manufacturers' performance data at this time, the D4 appears to have been only marginally faster than the 8CV models from the volume manufacturers: the Delage D4 was marginally heavier than the volume manufacturer's rival products, presumably reflecting more conservative production processes.

The D4 did, for a time, boost Delage sales, but the effect proved short-lived. In 1934 production came to an end.

=== Comparative data - the Delage D4 and its rivals from the volume auto-makers ===
The Delage D4 and its competitors (Model Year 1934) Basic data comparatives
	Cylinders	Engine size (cc)	Valvegear	Tax Horsepower	Claimed max power	Claimed top speed	Wheelbase
Delage D4	4 (77 x 79.5 mm)	1,480 cc	overhead valves	8 CV	40 hp (30 kW) @ 4,200 rpm	100 km/h (63 mph)	2,800 mm (110.2 in)
Citroën Rosalie 8CV	4 (68 x 100 mm)	1,452 cc	side-valves	8 CV	32 hp (24 kW) @ 3,200 rpm	90 km/h (56 mph)	2,700 mm (106.3 in)
Peugeot 301 CR	4 (72 x 90 mm)	1,465 cc	side-valves	8 CV	37 hp (28 kW) @ 4,000 rpm	95 km/h (59 mph)	2,720 mm (107.1 in)
Renault Monaquatre YN2/YN3	4 (70 x 95 mm)	1,463 cc	side-valves	8 CV	30 hp (22 kW) @ 3,100 rpm	105 km/h (65 mph)	2,650 mm (104.3 in)

The Delage D4 and its volume auto-maker competitors (Model Year 1934) Price comparatives (Manufacturer's listed prices October 1933 except where indicated otherwise)
	Bare chassis ("Chassis nu")	"Coach" 2-doors/4-seats	"Berline" 4-doors	"Coupé" 2/3 seats	Cabriolet
Delage D4	23,500 francs	29,900 francs	34,000 francs	34,000 francs	39,500 francs
Citroën Rosalie 8CV	not listed	26,000 francs	18,750 francs (Demi-luxe); 20,100 francs (Luxe)	not listed	24,000 francs - 25,500 francs
Peugeot 301 CR	not listed	26,000 francs	20,500 francs (Normale); 26,000 francs (Grand luxe); 28,500 francs (Aérodynamique grand luxe)	not listed	26,000 francs
Renault Monaquatre YN2	not listed	24,400 francs	18,800 francs (luxe); 27,000 francs (Grand luxe); 21,200 francs (Conduite intérieure)	not listed	24,400 francs
Renault Monaquatre YN3 (January 1934)	not listed	not listed	17,800 francs (berline aérodynamique)	not listed	not listed
The body types selected for comparison in respect of the 8CV models from Citroën, Peugeot and Renault are in each case selected from a wider range of body options, in order to show the body types most closely comparable to the equivalently bodied Delage D4.
