= Delage D12 =

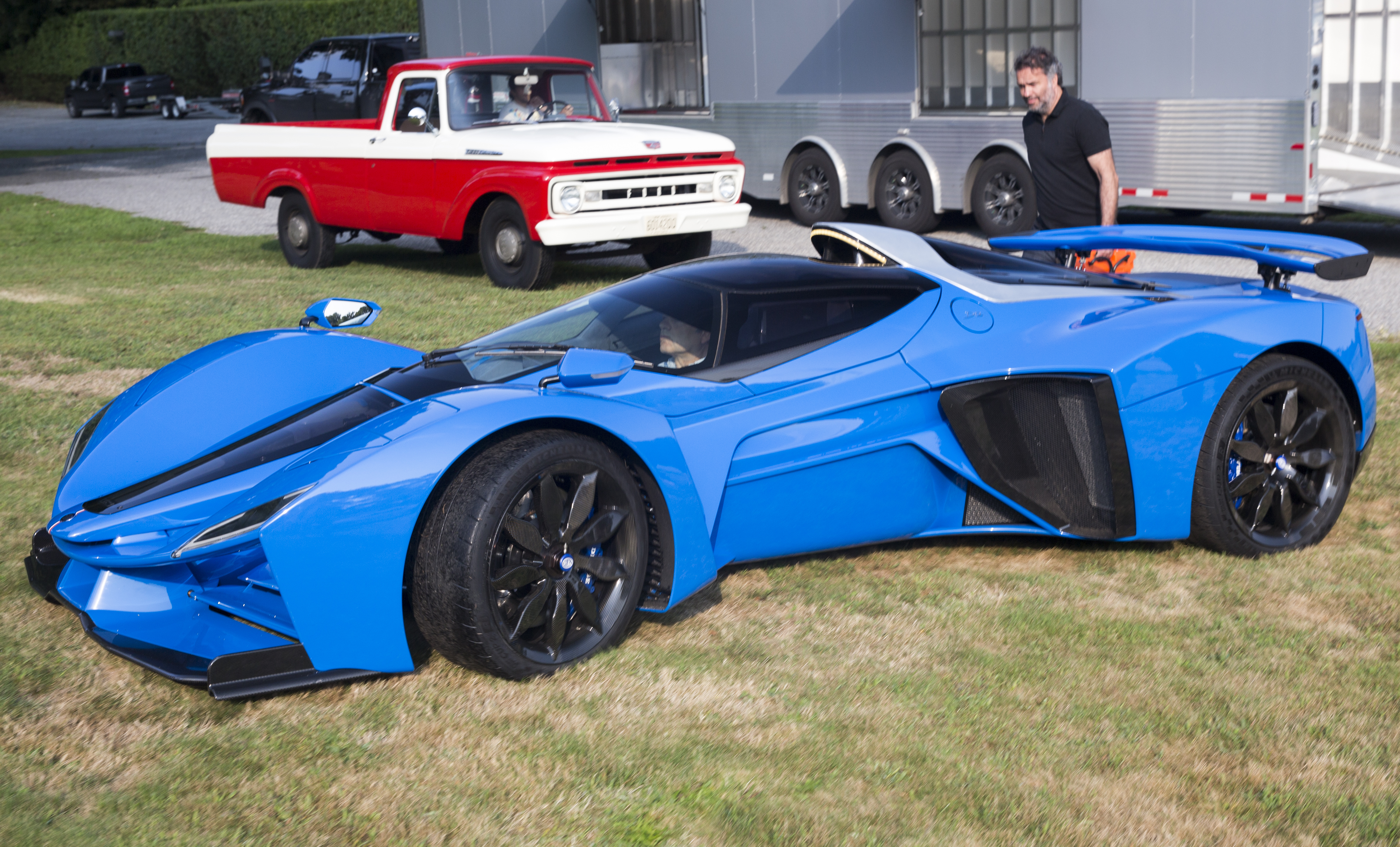

Overview
- Manufacturer: Delage
- Production: 2025–
- Assembly: France: Magny-Cours
- Designer: Benoit Bagur (technical director); Mike Cronin (interior designer)

Body and chassis
- Class: Sports car (S)
- Body style: 1-door coupe
- Layout: Rear mid-engine, rear-wheel-drive
- Doors: Canopy

Powertrain
- Engine: 7.6 L V12
- Power output: 1,010 PS (743 kW) (D12 Club); 1,100 PS (809 kW) (D12 GT)
- Transmission: 8-speed
- Hybrid drivetrain: Full hybrid

The Delage D12 is a hybrid street-legal sports car produced by the French automobile manufacturer Delage from 2022.

== History ==
The French car manufacturer Delage ceased operations in 1953. In 2019, the entrepreneur Laurent Tapie signed an agreement with the owners of the brand “Les Amis of Delage "in order to relaunch the Delage brand and produce the hybrid D12 in the Paris region from 2020.

== Presentation ==
On 10 and 11 December 2019, the resurrected manufacturer presented the Delage D12 Concept Car to a selection of potential clients in California as a world premiere. Two versions are announced: the D12 GT and the D12 Club. Both have the same carbon chassis, the same naturally aspirated 7.6 L V12 engine developing 990 PS (728 kW) and are intended to be homologated to be street legal in the United States, in Europe, and in most major markets. It is in hybridization that the technical sheet changes: the GT has a 110 PS (81 kW) electric motor (bringing the total power to 1,100 PS (809 kW) while the Club contains an electric motor of only 20 PS (15 kW) (for 1,010 PS (743 kW) of total power), but the Club is 90 kg lighter at (1300 kg dry weight versus 1390 kg for the GT). The GT will accelerate faster but, because of its lower weight, the Club will lap faster. Delage wishes to homologate the D12 in the European Union in 2023 to then try to beat, with the D12 Club version, the record of the legendary Nürburgring race track in Germany in the car category homologated for the road.

Delage's technical team is based in Magny-Cours where the D12 is regularly tested on the nearby F1 track of Magny-Cours. This technical team has accumulated 16 FIA World Champion titles, including the 1997 F1 World Champion Jacques Villeneuve, in charge of the final settings of the car, so that driving it provides the closest sensations to those driving an F1 car on the open road .

The D12 costs 2 million euros, excluding taxes and options. It will be produced in only 30 copies, and the intent is to introduce other Delage models. In 2023, the company stated that deliveries were slated to begin in early 2024. As of May 2026 the company website was still active and listed five dealerships, still presenting 2024 as the initial customer delivery date. In an interview with a French newspaper, Delage stated that one customer car was delivered in 2025 and two more in the first half of 2026, with a half-dozen solid orders on the books.

== Characteristics ==
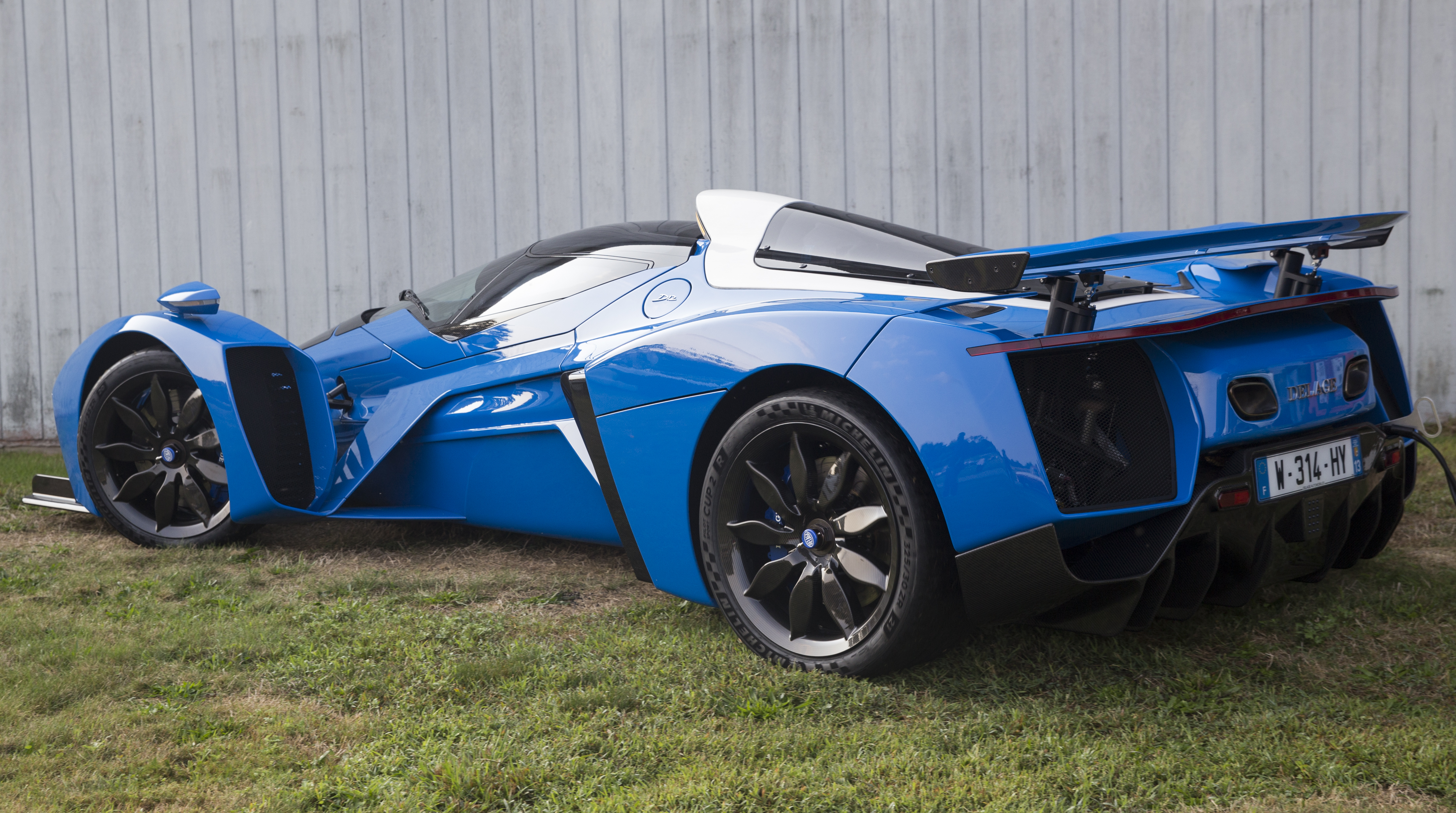
Rear view (D12-000 prototype)

The D12 is an attempt to offer the closest road-legal car ever made to a Formula 1, using a Monocoque and frontal crash-box in carbon, along with full carbon bodywork with active aerodynamics (front wings, airbrakes, rear wing), offering more than double the downforce of all cars currently road legal in the European Union. Delage is the only street legal car manufacturer with the rights to use Mauro Bianchi's contractive suspension patents for a road car. This design revolutionized F1 in 1998 and currently equips all F1 cars. The Delage has a central driving position, as in Formula 1, albeit with space for a passenger behind the driver, in tandem. While there is a canopy there are no traditional doors, and there is a "Speedster" option which incorporates a smaller windscreen and also an "F1" option with a wind deflector and no windscreen. As in Formula 1, Delage also has triple flow brake cooling, and a full carbon rim with a "fan" cooling effect

Other characteristics include an interior fully tailor-made for each customer on all its contact points: seat (full carbon), F1 type steering wheel handles, and pedal placement. The 7.6-liter Delage V12 engine is naturally aspirated, develops 730 kW; 980 hp (990 PS) and includes a low voltage electric motor developing either 81 kW; 110 hp (110 PS) (GT version) or 15 kW; 20 hp (20 PS) (Club version).

== Hybridization ==
The D12 Hybrid is powered by a 990 PS (728 kW; 976 hp) 7.6-litre naturally aspirated V12 engine developed by Delage. According to the refounder of the brand, it is "based on an existing engine" but the detailed information is reserved for Delage clients.

The internal combustion engine is coupled to an innovative electric motor: whether it is in the 20 PS (15 kW) or 110 PS (81 kW) version, it operates at low voltage unlike all the motors on current electric vehicles which require 400 or 800 volts. These high voltages justify the reinforcements required for the crash tests of electric vehicles by the approval authorities (in Europe and elsewhere), because the occupants could be electrocuted in the event of contact with the electrical wires.

By developing a low-voltage electric motor, Delage wishes to open the way to electric vehicles that are safe from the point of view of electrical voltage level, and thus do not require the specific reinforcements of crash tests. According to Laurent Tapie "this would save cost and weight, two of the major problems of current electric vehicles."

For the refounder of Delage, "we are above all a technological innovation company that makes hypercars, and not the opposite. Our hypercars will serve as a showcase for our technologies, which are intended to participate in the virtuous transformation of automobiles in the future."

== 2019 concept car ==
The D12 was preceded by the Delage D12 concept car, presented on 10 December 2019 in Los Angeles, United States.

== D12 Speedster & D12 "F1" ==
Delage unveiled in September 2022 a cabriolet version of the D12 called D12 Speedster (due to the smaller windscreen), and an "F1 type" version without a windscreen but with a wind deflector and, if the customer wishes, a Formula 1-type halo.

In both cases, the customer can convert his D12 coupé himself in a few minutes using a manual conversion system, offered as an option.
