= Époqu'auto =

Classic auto show

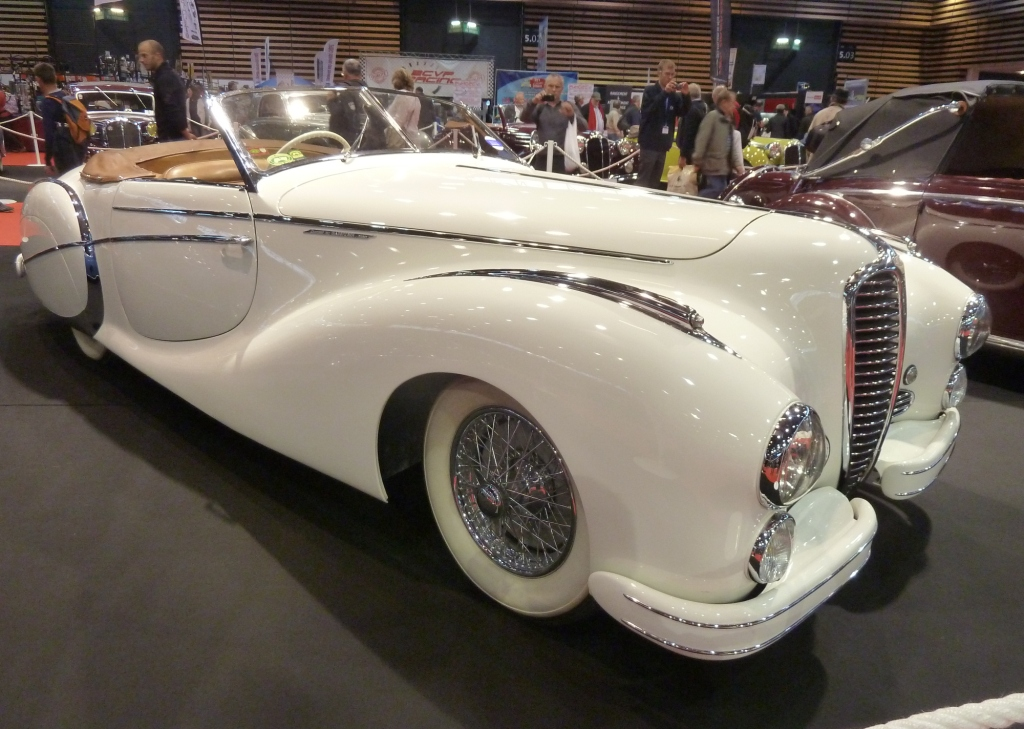
- Delahaye 135 bodied by Jacques Saoutchik at the 2016 edition
- Genre: Auto show
- Venue: Eurexpo
- Location: Lyon
- Country: France
- Inaugurated: 1978
- Attendance: 85,000 (2022)
- Organizer: AAA
- Website: epoquauto.com

Époqu'auto is a French classic auto show exhibiting a variety of vintage vehicles (cars, bicycles, motorcycles, trucks and accessories). It takes place in Lyon every year at Eurexpo.
