= Kellner-Béchereau 28VD =

- The Kellner-Béchereau 28VD circa 1933

General information
- Type: Racing aircraft
- National origin: France
- Manufacturer: Kellner-Béchereau
- Status: destroyed 14 May 1933

History
- First flight: c. May 1933

The Kellner-Béchereau 28VD was a French racing aircraft built to compete in the 1933 Coupe Deutsch de la Meurthe. Engine failure and damage sustained in the consequent emergency landing prevented the 28VD from participation in the race.

== Design and development ==
The Kellner-Béchereau 28VD was designed to compete in the 1933 Coupe Deutsch, a race around a 200 km (120 mi) circuit from Etampes in two 1,000 km (620 mi) flights separated by a refuelling stop. Engines of less than 8 L (490 cu in) were stipulated; the 7.95 L (485 cu in) Delage 12C.E.D.irs engine of the 28VD just met this limit.

The 28VD was a low wing, cantilever monoplane. Its wing span was small (6.65 m (21 ft 10 in); a wing area large enough to keep the wing loading to values comparable to those of World War II fighter aircraft designed a few years later produced an aspect ratio of only 4.2. In plan the wing was carefully faired into the fuselage and had a swept, straight leading edge, rounded tips and a curved trailing edge entirely occupied by ailerons. There were two spars, one perpendicular to the fuselage at mid-chord and one at an angle bearing the ailerons.

Its fuselage was slender, with a rounded cross-section. The 280 kW (370 hp) water-cooled, double-supercharged, inverted V-12 Delage engine drove a large diameter, two blade propeller. Its radiators were in the wing. There were two on each side, one inboard and one outboard, both occupying the full chord and forming the wing skin. An open cockpit was placed a little in front of the trailing edge of the wing, within a narrow dorsal fairing which stretched over half the fuselage, starting close to the nose. The fuselage tapered rearwards to a conventional tail, with a round-tipped triangular tailplane, mounted at mid-fuselage, which had an adjustable angle of incidence. Its vertical tail was tall and slightly rounded and the unbalanced rudder extended down to the keel.

The landing gear of the 28VD had retractable mainwheels, mounted on shock absorbing forward-raked, parallel legs from the wing. These were hinged to the lower fuselage on opened U-shaped frames. Retraction was vacuum-powered; to raise the wheels the tops of the legs were translated outward, swinging frames and wheels upwards. The tailskid was fixed to a small ventral extension of the fuselage under the fin.

The 1933 Coupe Deutsch de la Meurthe was scheduled to start on 28 May and each aircraft had to make a flight at more than 200 km/h (120 mph; 110 kn) over a 100 km (62 mi) course in the period 8–14 May to participate. The 28VD arrived at Etampes on 3 May to be flown by Vernhol; it is not known how much flying it had done before that, though it was only completed a fortnight before the competition. The early days of the test period were occupied with the refinement of the 28VD but on the 12–13 May it was reported to have engine problems. During the early tests it was decided to set a finer propeller pitch as the initial setting was producing to much drag on the engine. When the aircraft attempted its qualifying flight on the last allowed day, this change of setting allowed the engine to overspeed. As a result, a rubber joint in the cooling system failed, releasing a cloud of vapour which temporarily blinded the pilot and forced an emergency landing in which the undercarriage collapsed and the aircraft overturned. Vernhol was thrown clear and was not seriously hurt but the 28VD was too damaged to take part in the contest for which it was built.

== Specifications ==
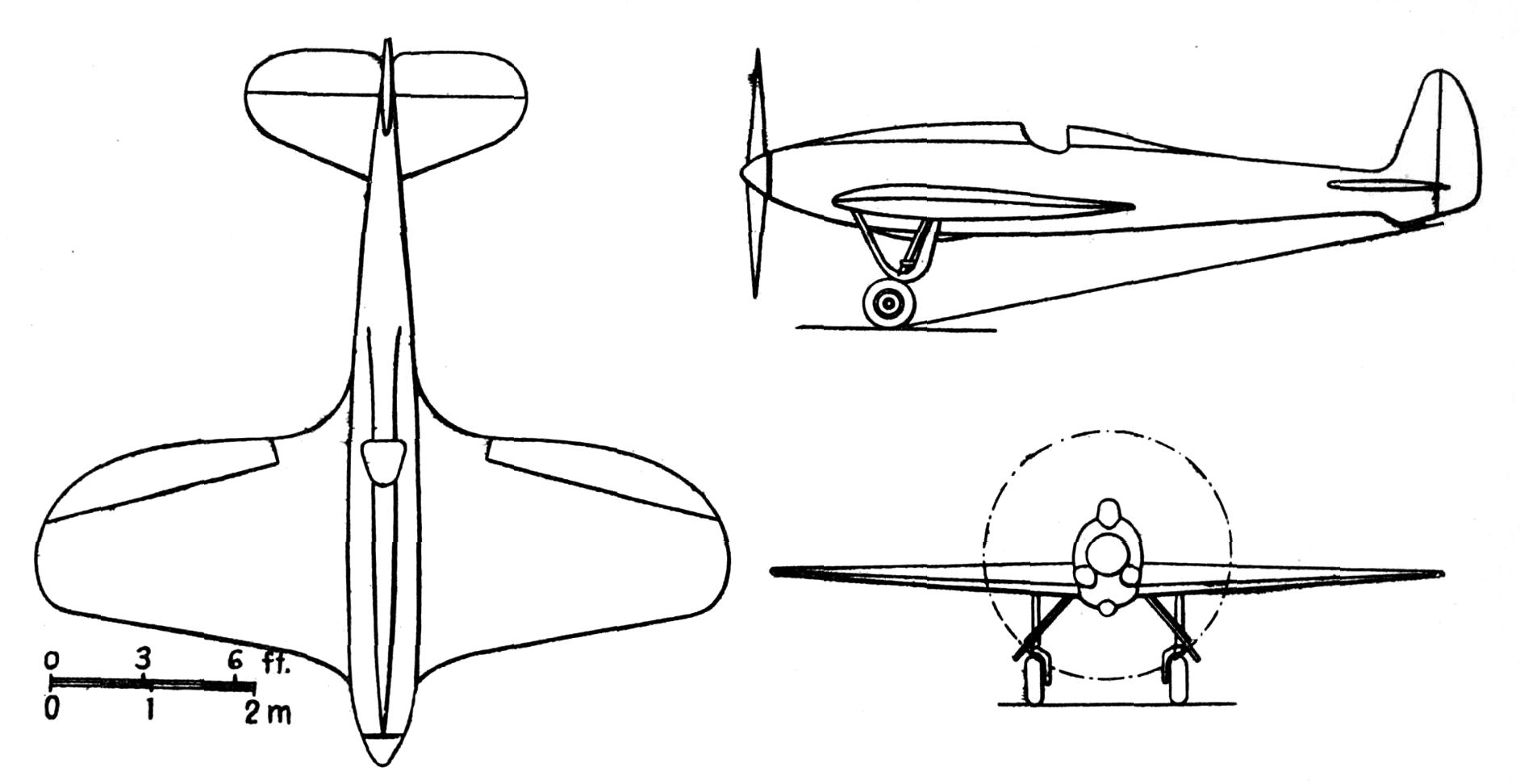
Kellner-Béchereau 28VD 3-view drawing from NACA-TM-724

Data from L'Aéronautique August 1933 Engine details from NACA Technical Memo. No.724

General characteristics

- Crew: One
- Length: 7.16 m (23 ft 6 in)
- Wingspan: 6.65 m (21 ft 10 in)
- Wing area: 10.6 m^{2} (114 sq ft)
- Aspect ratio: 4.2
- Empty weight: 1,002 kg (2,209 lb)
- Gross weight: 1,600 kg (3,527 lb)
- Powerplant: 1 × Delage 12C.E.D.irs Water-cooled, supercharged, inverted V12 engine, 280 kW (370 hp) at 3,900 rpm. Double reduction gear produced 1,900 rpm at the propeller
- Propellers: 2-bladed Ratier, 2.5 m (8 ft 2 in) diameter approximately, adjustable pitch

Performance

- Wing loading: 150 kg/m^{2} (31 lb/sq ft)
