= Kelsch =

Kelsch is a surname. Notable people with the surname include:

- Mose Kelsch (1897–1935), American football player
- RaeAnn Kelsch (1960–2018), American politician
- Walter Kelsch (born 1955), German football player
- Ken Kelsch (born 1947), American cinematographer
